= National Register of Historic Places listings in Cumberland, Rhode Island =

This is a list of Registered Historic Places in Cumberland, Rhode Island.

Contents: Counties in Rhode Island

Bristol | Kent | Newport | Providence (Pawtucket | Providence (city) | Woonsocket) | Washington

This National Park Service list is complete through NPS recent listings posted April 17, 2026.

	Name on the Register	Image	Date listed	Location	City or town	Description
1	Arnold Mills Historic District	Arnold Mills Historic District	December 28, 1978 (#78000070)	East of Cumberland Hill at Sneech Pond, Attleboro, and Abbott Run Valley Rds. 41°58′46″N 71°23′30″W	Cumberland	
2	Ashton Historic District	Ashton Historic District	November 1, 1984 (#84000367)	Roughly Mendon, Scott, and Old Angell Rds., Store Hill Rd., Front and Middle Sts. 41°56′20″N 71°25′54″W	Cumberland	
3	Ballou-Weatherhead House	Ballou-Weatherhead House	June 25, 1993 (#93000503)	Tower Hill Rd. (Pole 68); 41°59′47″N 71°26′38″W	Cumberland	
4	Berkeley Mill Village	Berkeley Mill Village	February 23, 1972 (#72000036)	Bounded roughly by Martin St., Mendon Rd., railroad, and cemetery 41°55′39″N 71°25′25″W	Cumberland	
5	Blackstone Canal	Blackstone Canal	May 6, 1971 (#71000030)	From Steeple and Promenade Sts. in Providence to the Massachusetts border in North Smithfield; 41°55′16″N 71°25′21″W	Lincoln, Cumberland, Woonsocket, and North Smithfield	Initial listing extended from Providence, through Pawtucket, and as far north as Lincoln; a 1991 expansion (#91001536) extended it to the state line; the canal itself extended into Worcester County, Massachusetts, where it is the subject of separate listings.
6	Burlingame-Noon House	Burlingame-Noon House	February 15, 1974 (#74000048)	3261 Mendon Rd. 41°58′32″N 71°27′25″W	Cumberland	
7	John Cole Farm	John Cole Farm	August 16, 1977 (#77000025)	East of Manville on Reservoir Rd. 41°59′26″N 71°24′24″W	Cumberland	
8	Furnace Carolina Site	Furnace Carolina Site	May 10, 1993 (#93000341)	Address Restricted	Cumberland	
9	Luke Jillson House	Luke Jillson House	August 12, 1982 (#82000141)	2510 Mendon Rd. 41°57′41″N 71°26′41″W	Cumberland	
10	Lonsdale Historic District	Lonsdale Historic District	May 25, 1984 (#84002022)	Lonsdale Ave., Blackstone Ct., and Front, Main, Cook, Broad, Mill, Cross and Blackstone Sts. 41°54′34″N 71°24′11″W	Cumberland and Lincoln	
11	Metcalf-Franklin Farm	Metcalf-Franklin Farm	June 7, 2007 (#07000526)	142 Abbott Run Valley Rd. 41°57′56″N 71°23′37″W	Cumberland	
12	Patterson Brothers Commercial Building and House	Patterson Brothers Commercial Building and House	June 10, 1993 (#93000502)	157, 159, and 161 Broad St. 41°54′10″N 71°23′32″W	Cumberland	Demolished 1998. Hardware store stands on the site.
13	St. Joseph's Church Complex	St. Joseph's Church Complex	August 12, 1982 (#82000007)	1303-1317 Mendon Rd. 41°56′03″N 71°25′40″W	Cumberland	
14	Lewis Tower House	Lewis Tower House	August 30, 1982 (#82000010)	2199 Mendon Rd. 41°57′14″N 71°26′33″W	Cumberland	
15	Tower-Flagg Barn Complex		May 20, 1998 (#98000574)	100 Abbott Run Valley Rd. 41°57′33″N 71°23′34″W	Cumberland	Demolished and replaced by housing development.
16	Whipple-Jenckes House	Whipple-Jenckes House	November 5, 1992 (#92001541)	8 Fairhaven Road; 41°57′25″N 71°24′02″W	Cumberland	

== See also ==
- National Register of Historic Places listings in Providence County, Rhode Island
- List of National Historic Landmarks in Rhode Island
