= Cumberland Monastery =

Historic municipal property and park in Cumberland, Rhode Island

- The Monastery; Monastery Park; Monastery Trails
- Entrance to the Cumberland Monastery grounds
- Interactive map of Cumberland Monastery
- Type: Municipal historic property and park
- Location: Cumberland, Rhode Island, United States
- Coordinates: 41.9344815°N 71.4040460°W
- Operator: Town of Cumberland
- Open: Dawn to dusk (grounds); library and office hours vary
- Facilities: Cumberland Public Library; Senior Center; Office of Children, Youth, and Learning; trail system; playground; outdoor stage
- Website: Official park map

The Cumberland Monastery is a town-owned property in Cumberland, Rhode Island, of roughly 481 acres (195 ha) centered on the former grounds of Our Lady of the Valley, a Trappist monastery established in 1900. Following a fire in 1950 and the monastic community's relocation, the property passed through subsequent ownership before being acquired by the Town of Cumberland between 1968 and 1972. It is now home to the Cumberland Public Library; the town's Senior Center; the Office of Children, Youth, and Learning (OCYL); and Monastery Park.

The property preserves a landscape shaped by Indigenous use, colonial agriculture, the Trappist community, and later municipal recreation, including stone walls, former farm and orchard areas, a granite quarry, and the Nine Men's Misery memorial. The grounds also have a long association with community and outdoor theater.

== History ==
=== Pre-colonial and colonial eras ===
The land lies within the traditional homelands of the Narragansett, Wampanoag, and Nipmuc peoples. Archaeological investigations have identified evidence of Indigenous activity within and near the present-day monastery grounds, including quarried stone tool materials such as quartz, felsite, and rhyolite.

During the colonial period, portions of the property were developed for farming, and stone walls built by the Whipple and Waterman families still mark former field boundaries. The grounds include the burial site commemorated as Nine Men's Misery, associated with nine colonists killed during King Philip's War in 1676.

=== Trappist monastery and college (1900–1972) ===
In 1899, the Bishop of Providence, Matthew Harkins, agreed to sell roughly 230 acres (93 ha) of the property to Fr. John Mary Murphy for $3,000, payable over 15 years without interest; Harkins had reportedly intended the land for a seminary. In 1900, monks from Petit Clairvaux in Nova Scotia established the Trappist monastery Our Lady of the Valley on the property. The monastic community developed orchards, fields, work roads, and quarry areas; many of these features later became part of the property's recreational trail system.

A fire in 1950 destroyed much of the monastery complex, and the Trappist community relocated to Spencer, Massachusetts. The surviving property subsequently passed to the Franciscan Friars of Graymoor, or Society of the Atonement, who operated a college on the grounds.

=== Town acquisition and municipal use ===
The Town of Cumberland acquired the former monastery grounds — once approximately 525 acres (212 ha) — in three parcels between 1968 and 1972; the final parcel, containing the monastery buildings, was purchased from the Franciscan Friars for $285,000 in December 1972. The surviving monastery building was subsequently adapted for municipal use as the Cumberland Public Library, which opened there in 1976 after the town incorporated three smaller neighborhood libraries into one by town resolution.

Today, the town refers to the roughly 481 acres (195 ha) property as the Cumberland Monastery, within which Monastery Park denotes the recreational trail system and grounds.

== Facilities and features ==
The Cumberland Monastery property contains the Cumberland Public Library, the Town of Cumberland's Senior Center, the Mayor's Office of Children, Youth, and Learning (OCYL), a municipal garage, and Monastery Park. The grounds are also used periodically for town events, including the Public Works Department's annual Eco-Depot household hazardous waste collection.

=== Cumberland Public Library ===
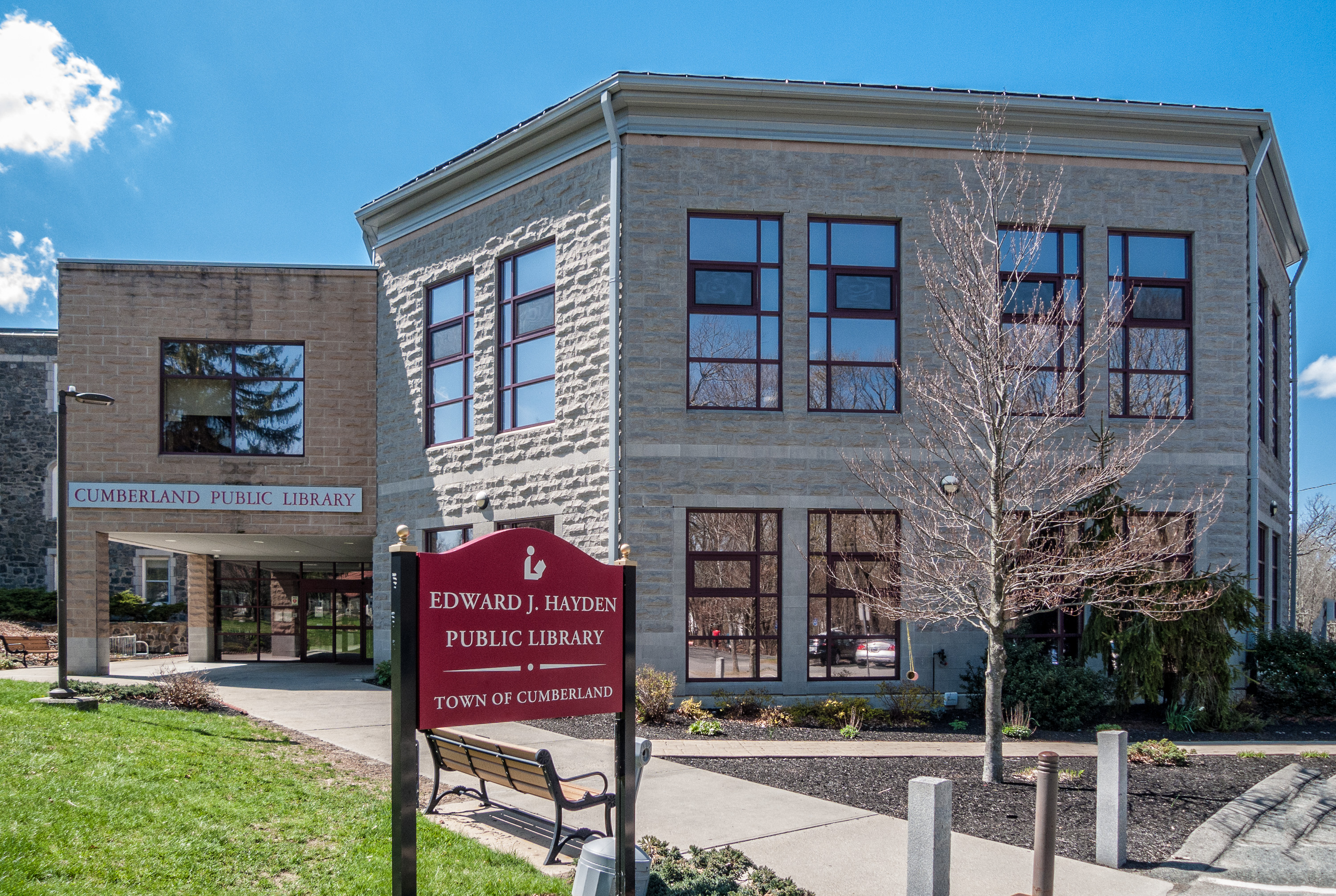
Cumberland Public Library

The Cumberland Public Library occupies the surviving monastery building — also known as the Hayden Center, after Edward J. Hayden, the town manager in the 1970s — and opened there in 1976, formed by the merger of three smaller neighborhood libraries.

=== Senior Center ===
The Cumberland Senior Center offers programs, meals, and transportation services for the town's older residents. Membership includes access to daily lunches, billiards, group trips, and weekly bingo.

=== Office of Children, Youth, and Learning ===
OCYL is a town department offering early childhood education, after-school programming, and youth development initiatives, including a youth commission and an annual leadership academy. Programs are open to all, with financial assistance available to residents.

=== Monastery Park ===
Monastery Park contains a mixture of mature forest, meadows, wetlands, former agricultural land, stone walls, and historic features associated with the monastery. Monastery Brook passes through portions of the property, and remnants of the monks' agricultural operations and granite quarry remain visible.

The Cumberland Conservation Commission and Rhode Island Land Trust Council have mapped more than 10 mi (16 km) of trails on the property, with the Cumberland Land Trust also assisting with trail signage. The trail network includes the Beauregard, Cart Path, Field, Homestead, Lynch, Monks Quarry, Nine Men's Misery, Old Road, Orchard, Stone Wall, Wetlands, and Whipple trails. A popular perimeter route, sometimes described as the "Monastery Trail," forms a loop of about 3.5 mi (5.6 km).

The park includes a playground near the library, renovated in 2019–2020 with new climbing structures, musical play equipment, and seating, and a nearby outdoor performance stage. The recently restored stage was installed by the Cumberland Company for the Performing Arts in the late 1980s, who used the monastery grounds for performances.

==== Nine Men's Misery ====
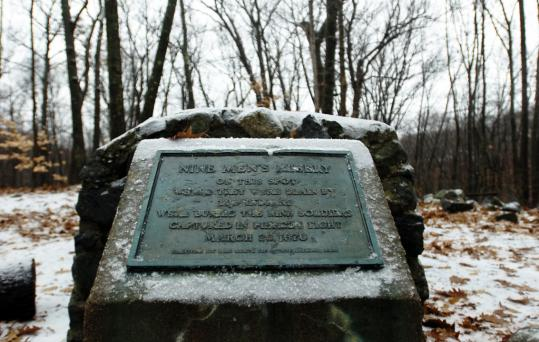
Nine Men's Misery marker

Nine Men's Misery is a memorial and historic site on the Monastery grounds associated with nine colonists killed during King Philip's War in 1676. The stone cairn marking the site dates to the time of the killings and was later solidified into a permanent memorial by the Trappist monks; the State of Rhode Island added a commemorative plaque in 1928. The burial site was disturbed several times over the years; the remains were disinterred and held in storage until the 1970s, when they were reinterred beneath the memorial. The site has been described as one of the oldest veterans' memorials in the United States.

==== Monks' quarry ====
The former monastery quarry, where monks extracted "pigeon-blue" granite used to construct the monastery's church and other buildings, is preserved within the park's trail system. Quarry roads and other paths established during the monastic period are now trails within the park.

==== Veteran's Place ====
Veteran's Place plaque

Veteran's Place, located at the entrance to the Monastery grounds, is a shaded memorial park featuring paved walking paths, benches, commemorative markers, flags, a howitzer, and a mortar launcher. The site honors veterans of all U.S. armed conflicts.

== Access ==
- Address: 1464 Diamond Hill Road, Cumberland, Rhode Island
- Grounds/trail hours: Dawn to dusk
- Park public access: Free

== See also ==
- Our Lady of the Valley (Cumberland, Rhode Island)
- Nine Men's Misery
- Cumberland, Rhode Island

== Sources ==
- Monastery Trail Map (Report). Cumberland Conservation Commission and Rhode Island Land Trust Council. 2016.
- "About". Cumberland Public Library.
- Green, Marcia (23 July 2014). "Cumberland acquired the Monastery Grounds in three pieces". The Valley Breeze.
- Hammond, Zoe (2024). "History of the Cumberland Monastery". History of the Cumberland Monastery Project.
- Kostrzewa, John (8 July 2022). "Hike Rhode Island: Former Trappist monastery offers quiet contemplation". The Providence Journal.
- Muñoz, Carlos R. (17 January 2025). "Finding serenity at the Monastery Trails in Cumberland, R.I." The Boston Globe.
- "Blackstone River Valley National Heritage Corridor: Interim Report" (PDF). National Park Service. 1989.
- Historic and Architectural Resources of Cumberland, Rhode Island (PDF) (Report). Rhode Island Historical Preservation Commission. 1998.
- "Cumberland Library Celebrates 50 years at the Monastery". Rhode Island Library Association. 2026.
- "Nine Men's Misery Cemetery (CU012)". Rhode Island Historical Cemeteries.
- Shorey, Ethan (9 October 2025). "Well-loved Monastery stage gets a facelift". The Valley Breeze.
- "Monastery Grounds Facilities". Town of Cumberland. 2024.
- "OCYL: The Mayor's Office of Children, Youth & Learning". Town of Cumberland.
- "Senior Center". Town of Cumberland.
- "Cumberland Eco-Depot Event at the Monastery Saturday". The Valley Breeze. 30 April 2026.
- "Friends of the Library". Cumberland Public Library.
- "Cumberland plans variety of veterans events". The Valley Breeze. November 5, 2015. p. 5.
