= Our Lady of the Valley (Cumberland, Rhode Island) =

Former Trappist monastery in Cumberland, Rhode Island

- Location within Rhode Island

Monastery information
- Order: Trappists
- Denomination: Catholic Church
- Established: 1900
- Disestablished: 1950
- Mother house: Petit Clairvaux, Tracadie, Nova Scotia
- Dedication: Our Lady of the Valley

People
- Founder: Dom John Mary Murphy
- Abbot: Dom Edmund Futterer (1945–1950)
- Prior: Dom John Mary Murphy (1900–1913); Dom John O’Connor (1914–1943)

Architecture
- Status: Former monastery
- Functional status: Buildings repurposed as Cumberland Public Library
- Closed: 1950

Site
- Location: Cumberland, Rhode Island
- Country: United States
- Coordinates: 41.93428°N 71.40339°W
- Visible remains: Stone monastery building exterior; chapel foundation; chapter wing; novitiate; porter’s lodge; laundry; machine shop; monastic quarry; stone walls; cart paths; irrigation pond
- Public access: Yes (Monastery Park)
- Website: Town of Cumberland fact sheet

Our Lady of the Valley was a Trappist monastery in Cumberland, Rhode Island, founded in 1900 by monks from the Monastery of Our Lady of Petit Clairvaux in Tracadie, Nova Scotia. After acquiring land in Rhode Island, the monks quarried local granite to build a substantial monastic complex on a 525‑acre tract. By 1949 they had begun planning a relocation to a more secluded site, but a fire in 1950 accelerated their move to what is now St. Joseph’s Abbey in Spencer, Massachusetts. The restored main monastic block, together with a later municipal addition, now houses the Cumberland Public Library within a large city park in what is now called the Cumberland Monastery.

== History ==
=== Pre‑monastery history ===
Archaeological evidence shows Late Archaic (c. 3000–1000 BCE) quarry sites and small camps within and adjacent to the present monastery grounds. Indigenous peoples, including the Narragansett, Wampanoag, and Nipmuc, used the uplands and river corridors seasonally for hunting, fishing, and quarrying.

European settlement began when William Blackstone arrived around 1635 and by the late seventeenth century the area was occupied by farming families such as the Watermans, Whipples, Dexters, and Ballous. During King Philip's War, nine soldiers were buried at the site now known as Nine Men's Misery, located on the monastery grounds.

=== Trappist monastery (1900–1950) ===
Aerial view of Our Lady of the Valley, ca. 1940

The Trappist community of Petit Clairvaux in Tracadie, Nova Scotia suffered two catastrophic fires that destroyed their chapel and monastery buildings. Bishop Matthew Harkins of Providence, Rhode Island encouraged them to resettle in Rhode Island and helped identify suitable land. Dom John Mary Murphy wrote that they purchased 230 acres from the bishop “for $3,000 payable in 15 years without interest,” describing the transaction as “more as a donation than a sale.” The monks arrived on March 1, 1900, with livestock, books, tools, and salvaged belongings.

Although the monastery stood within the town limits of Cumberland, many contemporary sources identified it as Lonsdale, Rhode Island, the nearest mill village and postal center. The monastery was sometimes called the “Abbey of Our Lady of the Valley” even though their monastic order classified it as a priory rather than an abbey.

The monks purchased the 95‑acre Abigail Whipple Homestead in 1902, adding it to the original acreage acquired from Bishop Harkins, and began quarrying granite to build a permanent monastery. Over the next several decades they continued acquiring adjacent farmland from the Whipple, Waterman, and other families, expanding the monastic property to 525 acres.

A catastrophic fire on March 21, 1950 destroyed the original front wing of the 1902 granite monastic block and left the monastic church structurally unsound, requiring its demolition. The community—numbering about 140 monks, novices, and lay brothers—was left homeless, and although portions of the chapter wing, novitiate wing, and porter’s lodge survived, the remaining complex was rendered unusable. The fire accelerated the community’s planned relocation to Spencer, Massachusetts.

=== Graymoor seminary period (1950–1968) ===
The property was sold to the Society of the Atonement (also known as the Graymoor Friars and Sisters), headquartered in Garrison, New York. The Society operated a seminary on the grounds, initially reusing the name Our Lady of the Valley and later renaming it Our Lady of Atonement. They rebuilt the fire‑damaged interior of the main monastic block and converted it into classrooms, offices, and dormitory space, also making use of the chapter wing, novitiate building, laundry, and machine shop for campus functions. Their presence was administrative and educational rather than monastic.

=== Town acquisition and park creation (1968–present) ===
The Town of Cumberland purchased the monastery grounds in three parcels between 1968 and 1972, acquiring the same 525‑acre footprint that the monks had assembled by the time of the 1950 fire. The city purchased 429 acres of woods and fields from the Graymoor Friars in 1968 and the main monastery buildings and immediate grounds in 1972. The parcels were acquired for public recreation, conservation, and municipal use, forming the modern Cumberland Monastery and library campus.

The town opened the centralized Cumberland Public Library—officially named the Edward J. Hayden Library after the town administrator who orchestrated the acquisition—within the primary surviving monastery building, consolidating three smaller local libraries.

The surrounding land was designated as Monastery Park, preserving trails, meadows, ponds, and the monks’ quarry for public access. The grounds developed into a center for walking, cross‑country running, nature study, and community events, continuing the cultural use established by the Cumberland Company for the Performing Arts and its renaissance fairs.

== Monastery complex ==
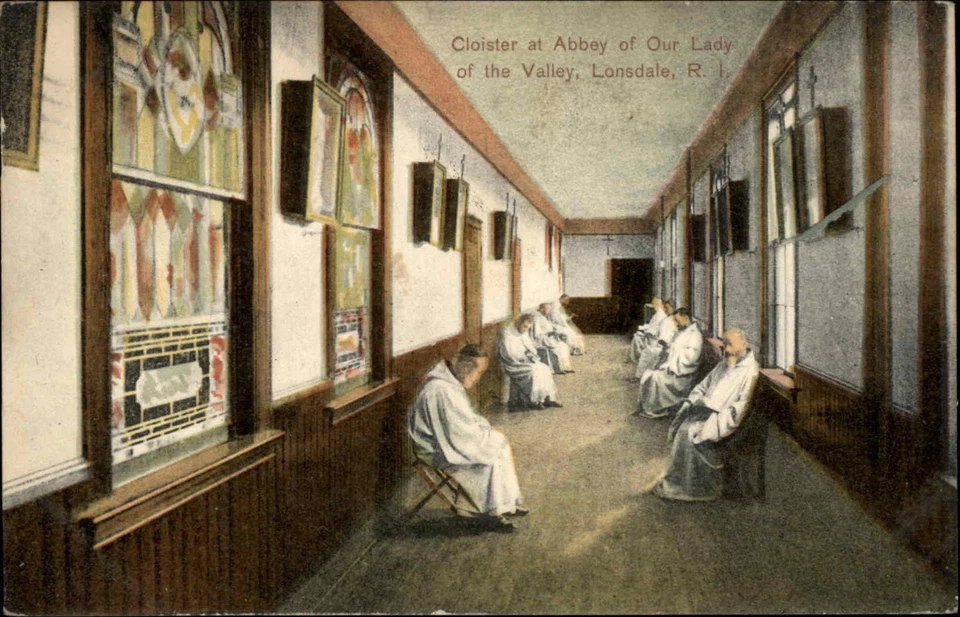
Trappist monks in the cloister of Our Lady of the Valley, Cumberland, Rhode Island (postcard, 1908)

The Trappists are members of the Order of Cistercians of the Strict Observance (OCSO), a reform branch of the wider Cistercian order that emphasizes silence, manual labor, and a strict observance of the Rule of Saint Benedict.

The Trappist monastery at Our Lady of the Valley functioned as a largely self‑sufficient community under its successive superiors: Dom John Mary Murphy (1900–1913), Dom John O’Connor (1914–1943), and Dom Edmund Futterer (1945–1950). During the 1920s and 1930s, the community typically housed 40–60 monks, then expanded rapidly after World War II, growing from 84 monks in 1943 to 137 in 1948 and reaching about 140 monks, novices, and lay brothers by 1950.

The heart of the monastery was the large stone multi‑purpose monastic block. Interior spaces included monastic dormitories for monks and lay brothers, the refectory, cloister corridors and workrooms, administrative rooms for the prior and abbot, and the attached stone monastic church completed in 1928.

Other Trappist‑era buildings included the porter’s lodge, chapter house, novitiate, workshops, dairy barn, piggery, granary, a spring‑water bottling building, freestanding laundry, and a machine shop.

=== Surviving structures ===
Although the 1950 fire destroyed the entire front wing of the 1902 monastic block and left the attached stone church structurally unsound, requiring its demolition, portions of the chapter wing, novitiate wing, porter’s lodge, and the exterior walls of the block survived.

=== Grounds and landscape ===
During the Trappist era, the surrounding grounds included stone walls and drainage channels marking former fields and pastures, apple and cherry orchards, grazing meadows for cattle and sheep, an irrigation pond used for ice harvesting, and the granite ledge where monks quarried stone for construction.

One historic feature is the Nine Men's Misery Monument, built by the Trappists in 1928 over the traditional burial site of nine colonists killed during King Philip's War in 1676. The burial site was disturbed several times, including by medical students, and the soldiers’ bones were stored until the 1970s before being reinterred beneath the plaque.

=== Acreage ===
Historic records show that the Trappist monks assembled approximately 525 acres of contiguous farmland between 1902 and 1945. When the Town of Cumberland acquired the monastery grounds between 1968 and 1972, the property was purchased in three parcels:

- Parcel B – 167 acres, purchased in 1968 with state Green Acres funding.
- Parcel C – 262 acres, also purchased in 1968.
- Parcel A – 95 acres, purchased in 1972 and containing the monastery buildings.

These parcels together constitute the full historic monastery estate.

== Present day ==
The surviving stone shell of the main monastic block—rebuilt internally during the Graymoor period and expanded by the town—now houses the Cumberland Public Library (the Edward J. Hayden Library). Today, the Town of Cumberland maintains the property as the Cumberland Monastery. The town's Parks and Recreation Department manages the public recreation areas, which feature walking trails, meadows, ponds, a veterans' memorial, a playground, and an outdoor performance stage.

== Sources ==
- Schrepfer, Luke (1947). Pioneer Monks in Nova Scotia. St. Augustine’s Monastery.
- Bertonière, Gabriel (2005). If You Love Me You Will Do My Will. W.W. Norton.
- Merton, Thomas (1949). The Waters of Siloe. Harcourt, Brace.
- Murphy, John Mary (1905). The Cistercian Order: Its Object, Its Rule. Riverside Press.
- Futterer, Edmund (1947). The Cistercian Monks of the Strict Observance. Our Lady of the Valley.
- Hammond, Zoe (2024). "History of the Cumberland Monastery". History of the Cumberland Monastery Project.
- Green, Marcia (23 July 2014). "Cumberland acquired the Monastery Grounds in three pieces". The Valley Breeze.
- Shorey, Ethan (23 July 2014). "Monastery trails are a treasure in the heart of town". The Valley Breeze.
- Kandarian, Paul (11 March 2014). "Rural Cumberland, R.I., with a rich history". The Boston Globe.
- Roberts, Michael (1989). Blackstone River Valley National Heritage Corridor Interpretive Plan (PDF) (Report). National Park Service.
- Kostrzewa, John (8 July 2022). "Hike Rhode Island: Former Trappist monastery offers quiet contemplation". The Providence Journal.
- Muñoz, Carlos R. (17 January 2025). "Finding serenity at the Monastery Trails in Cumberland, R.I." The Boston Globe.
- Robinson, Dana (2021). "Franciscan Friars of the Atonement". North Carolina Community Foundation.
- Shorey, Ethan (6 March 2025). "At Monastery, where management limited, woods fill in". The Valley Breeze.
- Shorey, Ethan (9 October 2025). "Well-loved Monastery stage gets a facelift". The Valley Breeze.
- "Cumberland Library Celebrates 50 years at the Monastery". Rhode Island Library Association. 2026.
- Historic and Architectural Resources of Cumberland, Rhode Island (PDF) (Report). Rhode Island Historical Preservation Commission. 1998.
- "Fr. Laurence Bourget O.C.S.O." Telegram & Gazette. 16 December 2014.
- "Monks Left Homeless by Fire". The Catholic Bulletin. Providence, Rhode Island: The Catholic Bulletin. 1 April 1950.
