= Daniel Stewart (politician) =

American politician

Daniel L. Stewart (born June 30, 1962) is an American politician. He was the first openly gay elected mayor in New York state history (November 1999), taking office January 1, 2000. As mayor of Plattsburgh, he served three terms.

== Biography ==
Daniel Stewart was born in East Hartford, Connecticut, and was raised in Pawtucket and Cumberland, Rhode Island. He was one of four children, including a brother Michael and sisters Cheryl and Donna. Raised in the Fairlawn section of Pawtucket and the Valley Falls section of Cumberland, he attended Nathanael Greene Elementary, Samuel Slater Junior High School, Cumberland Middle School South and Cumberland High School. Graduating high school in June 1980 at age 17, he signed paperwork and entered military service with the United States Air Force. From 1980-1988, he served in the U.S. Air Force, stationed at Lackland AFB in San Antonio, Texas; Keesler AFB in Biloxi, Mississippi; Ellsworth AFB in Rapid City, South Dakota; and his final stationing at Plattsburgh AFB in Plattsburgh, New York.

He entered politics in the summer of 1993 and won election that year to serve as a city councilor for Ward 6 in Plattsburgh from 1994 to 2000, with a brief term as mayor pro tem from 1996-1998. In the 1999 election for mayor, he defeated five-term mayor Clyde Rabideau by 104 votes. Stewart became the first openly gay elected mayor in NY State history.

Though he disagreed with George W. Bush's views on abortion and gay rights, he was one of the so-called "Austin 12" who met with Bush in Austin, Texas, during the 2000 election in hopes of forcing Bush to moderate his opinions on gay issues. Concerning gay marriage, Stewart has shifted his views, going from supporting gay civil unions to full gay marriages. He married his partner, Jon Recor of West Chazy, New York, on November 5, 2004, in Montreal, Quebec. They currently reside in Orlando, Florida.

Mayor Stewart was appointed in 2006 as Chairman and Commissioner of the New York State Commission of Correction by then-Governor George E. Pataki. Stewart held all three commissioner positions at the SCOC (Chairman, Chair of the Medical Review Board and Chair of the Citizens Policy and Complaint Review Council). Stewart left state service in February 2011 and entered the private sector. He is currently employed as the Senior Justice Advisor for Connected Justice at San Jose-based Cisco Systems, supporting the Connected Justice sector for the Americas Theatre.

Stewart serves as a board member of the National Law Enforcement and Firefighters Children's Foundation. The board serves the surviving families of law enforcement officers and firefighters who are lost in the line of duty. Stewart also serves on the Victory Campaign Board, which helps to choose which candidates (running for office who are openly gay) will receive endorsements for funding from the Victory Fund Donor Network.
