= Cumberland High School (Rhode Island) =

Location
- 2600 Mendon Road; Cumberland, RI 02864; United States; 41°57′54″N 71°26′51″W

Information
- Type: Public High school
- Established: c. 1895
- School district: Cumberland Public Schools
- Principal: Adolfo Costa
- Faculty: 101.60 (FTE)
- Grades: 9-12
- Enrollment: 1,430 (2018-19)
- Campus type: High school
- Colors: Blue and white
- Mascot: Captain Clipper
- Nickname: Clippers
- Website: Cumberland High School

Cumberland High School is a public school located in Cumberland, Rhode Island. It is a part of the Cumberland School Department. In its current location since 1962, the school serves approximately 1,500 students.

== Statistics ==
USNews Rankings
#4,881 in National Rankings
#19 in Rhode Island High Schools
#28 in Providence, RI Metro Area High Schools

== History ==
The current building was built in 1961 and renovated in 1973. The town's mayor presented a capital improvement plan for the school in 2002, but funding was limited and residents questioned the project's first phase plans for a wellness center (athletic complex). A few months later, the New England Association of Schools and Colleges gave the school until October 2005 to improve the school's facilities and technology or have its accreditation status placed on probation.

A town referendum was held in September 2005 asking voters to approve the town borrowing $30 million to renovate Cumberland High School. The referendum's success is credited in part to a student group called Save Our Schools, which had been organized as part of the school's requirement of 15 hours of teacher-supervised service learning.

NASSP (the National Association of Secondary School Principals) designated Alan Tenreiro of Cumberland High School as 2016 National Principal of the Year.

== Campus ==
Cumberland High school has three main buildings. The Main building houses the school cafeteria, main office, and the majority of the CHS's classrooms and resources. The Transitional building is a circular-shaped building primarily houses the ninth grade class including lockers. Additionally, the Transitional building is home to the Cumberland School Department administration. The Transitional building and Main buildings are connected by an enclosed bridge. The Wellness Center houses CHS's gymnasiums and locker rooms as well as health classrooms and a weight room. It is the newest of the three buildings.

The campus finished major renovations known as CHS 2010 at the end of the 2007–2008 school year. This project was designed to create a 21st-century learning environment on the campus of Cumberland High School. These renovations included the addition of a science and technology wing, the Wellness Center, a fine arts wing, and the refurbishing of numerous other areas.

The 2008–2009 school year marked the opening of several newly installed computer labs, including the Graphic Design Lab, the World Language Lab, and the CAD Lab.

== Curriculum ==
Cumberland High houses departments in English, Mathematics, Sciences, History, Languages, Special Education, and Fine Arts.

The three publications at the school are "The Scanner", the Literary Magazine, and the French Newsletter.

=== Athletics ===
Cumberland High School teams hold 47 state championship titles and 3 New England titles. These include five state championships in golf (1980, 1982, 1989–1991), seven state championships (1977–1980, 1986–1988) and one New England championship (1974) in boys' swimming, five state championships in girls' swimming (1992–1996, 1999), as well as three state championships in girls' soccer (2002, 2003, 2004). The school took the 2005 state championship title in wrestling. The wrestling team also won the 2009-2010 state championship. Most recently, the Ice Hockey team won the 2008 state championship and the girls' basketball team also won the state championship in 2008. There is also a Robotics Team that traveled to Atlanta in 2007 to participate in the VEX World Competition. In 2012 the girls' lacrosse team were named state champions with a 12-0-0 season.

== Notable alumni ==
- Bruce Caldwell played in both Major League Baseball and the National Football League
- Robert Leo "Bobby" Farrelly, Jr. (born June 17, 1958) is an American film director, screenwriter and producer.
- Peter John Farrelly (born December 17, 1956) is an American film director, screenwriter, producer and novelist.
- Aaron Fricke (class of 1980) is a gay rights activist
- Johnny Goryl, MLB player (Chicago Cubs, Minnesota Twins)
- John LaRose, MLB player (Boston Red Sox)
- David Macaulay (class of 1964) is an author and Caldecott Medal-winning illustrator
- Suzanne Martin (Moore) (class of 1977) is an Emmy Award-winning television producer and creator of the show "Hot In Cleveland"
- Dan McKee (class of 1969), Governor of Rhode Island since 2021
- Annette Nazareth (class of 1974) was a Commissioner of the U.S. Securities and Exchange Commission from August 2005 to January 2008.
- Linda Nochlin (class of 1947) was a leading figure in the abstract expressionist art movement, and one of the first American women to gain notoriety as an artist
- Cory Pesaturo is the 2017 Guinness World Record holder for the longest continuous playing of the accordion and the winner of the 2010 World Jazz Accordion Championships
- Daniel Stewart (class of 1980) was the first openly gay elected mayor in New York State history - Mayor of Plattsburgh, New York (2000–2006), and now serves as Chairman and Commissioner of the New York State Commission of Correction

== See also ==
- Fricke v. Lynch
