= American Supply Company Building =

Historic 1876 industrial building in Central Falls, Rhode Island

- U.S. National Register of Historic Places
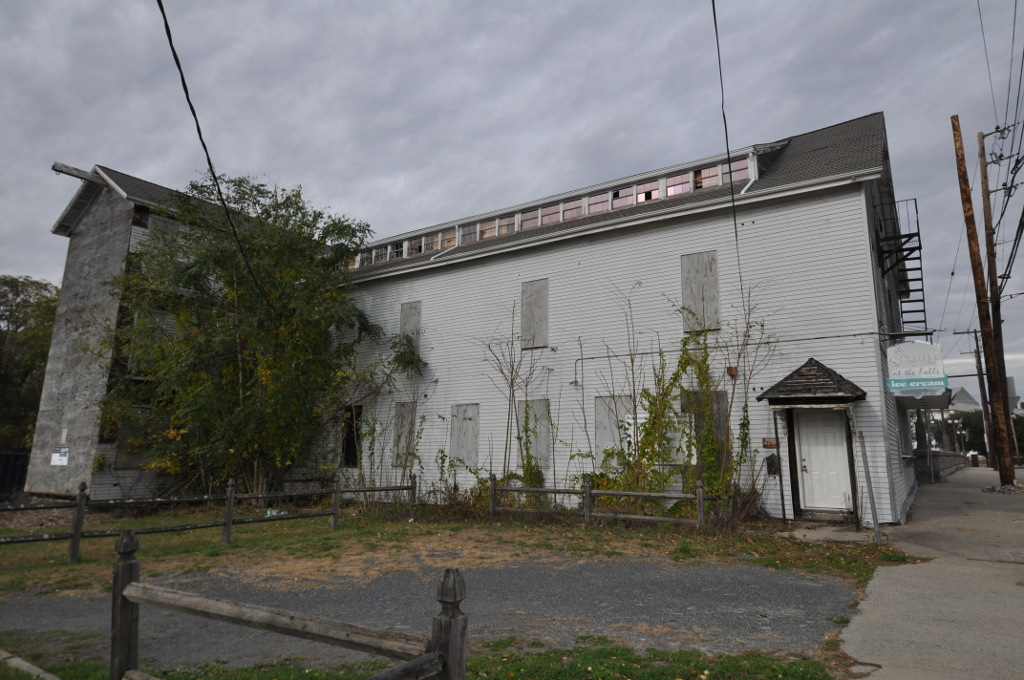
- The American Supply Company Building in 2017

- Location within Rhode Island Location within the United States
- Location: 1420 Broad Street, Central Falls, Rhode Island
- Coordinates: 41°53′56″N 71°23′24″W
- Area: 1 acre (0.40 ha)
- Built: 1876
- Architect: Unknown
- Architectural style: Vernacular industrial
- NRHP reference No.: 100000978
- Added to NRHP: 2017-05-08

The American Supply Company Building is a historic industrial structure located at 1420 Broad Street in Central Falls, Rhode Island. Built in 1876, it originally housed a major regional manufacturer of loom harnesses, reeds, heddles, and leather belting that supplied the Blackstone Valley textile industry. The building was listed on the National Register of Historic Places in 2017.

As of the 2020s, the building is part of Central Falls Landing, a riverfront redevelopment project. It houses a restaurant, an event venue, and the Blackstone Valley Tourism Council’s headquarters and riverboat operations.

== Description and history ==
The American Supply Company Building is located on the south bank of the Blackstone River, across from the historic Valley Falls Mill. It is a 2½‑story wood‑frame structure finished in vinyl siding laid over original clapboards, with a gabled roof and continuous shed‑roof dormers. The interior retains exposed timber framing and remnants of a late‑19th‑century freight elevator powered by water or steam.

=== Industrial use (1876–1961) ===
Myron Fish, originally a loom‑harness manufacturer in Worcester, Massachusetts, relocated to the Valley Falls mill complex around 1870. In 1876, he leased land across Broad Street and constructed the present building. Fish’s company merged in 1883 with John Kendrick’s Providence‑based loom‑parts firm to form the American Supply Company. The business expanded rapidly, adding a massive 176‑foot ell in 1890 and employing about 100 workers by 1891. The company closed in 1961 as New England’s textile industry declined.

=== Post‑industrial uses (1961–present) ===
After the American Supply Company closed, the building housed a braided rug manufacturer from 1963 to 1991.

In 1993, the building became the first permanent home of the Cumberland Company for the Performing Arts, which opened the Blackstone River Theatre inside the renovated mill. The company described the building as “very easy to convert for the use of a theater,” noting its intact beams, sprinkler system, and accessibility features. The Cumberland Company disbanded in July 1994.

After the company’s dissolution, the venue continued hosting concerts at the Blackstone River Theatre. The final concert at the Central Falls location took place in June 1996, before the theater relocated to a restored Masonic Temple at 549 Broad Street in Cumberland.

Following the theater’s departure, the building returned to mixed commercial use, including an ice‑cream shop and bait‑and‑tackle store. In the early 2000s, the City of Central Falls sought redevelopment proposals for the riverfront site, including a mixed‑use project called The Landing, though the plan did not proceed.

A major revitalization began in 2017, when the Tai‑O Group partnered with the city to rehabilitate the building as Central Falls Landing, a riverfront commercial and tourism hub. As of the 2020s, the building houses Shark Restaurant & Lounge, an event venue, and the Blackstone Valley Tourism Council’s headquarters and riverboat operations. In 2026, Shark Restaurant was listed for sale as the owners prepared to retire.

== See also ==
- National Register of Historic Places listings in Providence County, Rhode Island
- Blackstone Valley Historical Society – American Supply Company

== Citations ==
- "NRHP nomination for American Supply Company Building" (PDF). Rhode Island Preservation.
- Patricia A. Russell (August 8, 1993). "Finally, there's no place like home: Cumberland Company opens season in Central Falls theater complex". Providence Journal.
- Sonya F. Gray (July 21, 1994). "Financial troubles force closing of Cumberland Company theater". Evening Bulletin.
- "Regional Digest – Blackstone River Theatre concert listing". Providence Journal. December 1, 1995.
- Andy Smith (June 27, 1996). "POP MUSIC: Weekends now kick off on Thursday". Providence Journal.
- Tatiana Pina (June 22, 2004). "River Days – City seeks new proposals for Blackstone River site". Providence Journal.
- Nancy Kirsch (July 4, 2017). "Landing project aims high". Valley Breeze.
- Ethan Shorey (January 27, 2022). "Shark sited on the Blackstone River". Valley Breeze.
- Paul Edward Parker (June 5, 2022). "RISING – RI's latest renaissance city is remaking its image". Providence Journal.
- Gail Ciampa (March 18, 2026). "RI restaurant scene has openings, closings and sales". Providence Journal.
