= Cumberland School Department =

School district in Rhode Island, United States

Cumberland School Department is the school district of Cumberland, Rhode Island.

== History ==
Phil Thornton became the superintendent in 2011. In 2015 he was to leave his role as superintendent, and became superintendent of Warwick Public Schools. Bob Mitchell was chosen by school board members to become the next superintendent, and he began his term that year.

In 2019 the school board gave Mitchell an additional two years as superintendent.

In 2021 Mitchell retired, and Thornton again became superintendent of the Cumberland school district.

== Schools ==
High schools

- Cumberland High School

Middle schools

- Joseph L. McCourt Middle School
- North Cumberland Middle School

Elementary schools

- Ashton School
- Community School
- Garvin Memorial School
- John J. McLaughlin Cumberland Hill School
- B.F. Norton School

Preschool

- Cumberland Preschool Center
