= Mayoral Academies =

Rhode Island Mayoral Academies (RIMA) are publicly funded charter schools in the state of Rhode Island that have been freed from some of the rules, regulations, and statutes that apply to other charter schools in order to better attract nonprofit charter management organizations with a track record of success. The legislation creating mayoral academies was championed by a coalition of community and business leaders led by Cumberland, RI Mayor Daniel McKee and passed into law as part of the 2009 Rhode Island state budget, which was approved on June 17, 2008.

== History ==
The mayoral academy idea in Rhode Island was originated by then-Mayor Daniel McKee and developed by a coalition of Rhode Island mayors and town administrators, Cumberland Director of Children, Youth, and Learning Michael Magee, Progreso Latino CEO Ramon Martinez, and policy experts Bryan Hassel of Public Impact and Martin R. West of Brown University.

The eight Rhode Island municipal leaders supporting the plan were Joseph Almond, Town Administrator of Lincoln, RI; James E. Doyle, Mayor of Pawtucket, RI; Daniel J. McKee, Mayor of Cumberland, RI; Charles Moreau, Mayor of Central Falls, RI; David Cicilline, Mayor of Providence, RI; Charles Lombardi, Mayor of North Providence, RI; Michael T. Napolitano, Mayor of Cranston, RI; and Joe Polisena, Mayor of Johnston, RI.

Prominent business and community leaders working on behalf of its passage included Alan Hassenfeld, Chairman of the Executive Committee at Hasbro; Angus Davis, Rhode Island Board of Regents for Elementary and Secondary Education; Laurie White, Greater Providence Chamber of Commerce; Stephanie Chafee, Founder, Rhode Island Free Clinic; and Ron Wolk, Founder of Education Week and Chairman of The Big Picture Company.

The legislation creating the academies was introduced as H7874 in the Rhode Island House during the 2008 legislative session. With the support of Majority Leader Gordon Fox and Majority Whip Peter Kilmartin, it was subsequently added as Article 38 in the state budget.

== Schools ==
In fall 2009, Seth Andrew was recruited to found the first Mayoral Academy, Democracy Prep Blackstone Valley (DPBV) (now known as Blackstone Valley Prep), which serves students from Central Falls, Cumberland, Lincoln and Pawtucket who were selected through a random lottery. DPBV was based on the successful model of public charter schools based in Harlem, NY and as a Brown University Graduate, Andrew was one of the few charter network leaders in the nation who had ties to the state of Rhode Island. Democracy Prep is one of the highest performing schools in the City of New York, and the network currently serves more than 5,000 low-income students across five regions. After the Rhode Island gubernatorial election of 2010, Democracy Prep parted ways with the board of Rhode Island Mayoral Academies citing major concerns about the political and financial risks presented by the Mayoral Academy model to their mission and model.

Since 2010, Blackstone Valley Prep has continued to grow the number of campuses it operates. Additional Mayoral Academies have opened including Achievement First in Providence and Rise Prep in Woonsocket.

== See also ==
- Charter School
