= Cumberland Company for the Performing Arts =

Former non-profit physical theatre company in Rhode Island

- 1988 Season logo
- Formation: 1983
- Dissolved: 1994
- Type: Regional theatre company
- Purpose: Action theatre, stage combat, classical adaptations
- Location(s): Cumberland and Central Falls, Rhode Island, U.S.
- Artistic director: Normand Beauregard

The Cumberland Company for the Performing Arts was a Rhode Island nonprofit theatre company founded in 1983 by stage combat veteran Normand Beauregard. Known for its physically demanding productions and large-scale outdoor historical pageants, it became Rhode Island's second-largest nonprofit theatre organization during the late 1980s. The company later established the Blackstone River Theatre in Central Falls before disbanding in 1994.

== History ==
The Cumberland Company for the Performing Arts was founded in spring 1983 by Normand Beauregard, a veteran of New York stage and screen who sought to create a theatre ensemble emphasizing action, swordplay, and original storytelling. He was joined by associate producer and dance director Yvonne Seggerman, associate artistic director Craig Handel, and resident designer and combat instructor T. James Glenn.

The troupe established its headquarters at the historic Gatehouse of the Our Lady of the Valley Monastery, a former 525‑acre Trappist property on Diamond Hill Road in Cumberland, Rhode Island. From 1983 through 1990, the Monastery served as the company’s creative base, training center, and primary outdoor performance site. Its signature production, The Faire, ran for eight seasons as a six‑hour medieval‑renaissance adventure staged across the grounds, supported by a Summer Training Program in acting, dance, stage combat, and music.

By the late 1980s the company had grown into a regional touring ensemble, performing continuously at colleges, parish halls, high schools, and cultural institutions across Rhode Island while maintaining major productions at the Monastery. Newspaper coverage described the troupe’s rapid expansion: by 1987 it had doubled its attendance and income each year, involving hundreds of performers and volunteers. In 1988, an arson fire destroyed $50,000 worth of scenic materials and lumber stored at the Monastery, prompting benefit events featuring actors John Goodman, Tess Harper, and Kathleen Turner. Despite the setback, the Providence Journal called the company Blackstone Valley’s “hottest tourist attraction,” estimating 200,000 visitors that year.

The following is a partial list of productions, organized by venue:

- Our Lady of the Valley Monastery (Cumberland): Productions included The Faire (1983–1990), the recurring Summer Training Program, Dangerous Liaisons (1991), Swashbucklers (1991), and Taming of the Shrew (1991).
- Providence College: Productions included the original works Tales of the Knights of Revelry (1986), The Bard’s Brawls (1986), and the holiday production Tales of Christmas Past (1989).
- St. Joseph’s Parish Hall (Cumberland): Productions included the 1987 staging of The First Christmas.
- Bryant College (Smithfield): Productions included A Christmas Carol (1989), The Three Musketeers (1990), The Pirates of Penzance (1990), Robin Hood (1991), True West (1992), and Camelot (1992).
- North Smithfield High School: Productions included Knaves, Rogues and Vagabonds (1985), Twelfth Night (1992), ’S Wonderful! ’S Marvelous! ’S Gershwin! (1992), and the historical pageant Blackstone Borne (1992), created in partnership with the Blackstone River Valley National Heritage Corridor Commission.
- Westbeth Theatre Center (New York City): Productions included the New York staging of The Baron’s Gambit (1985), following its Rhode Island premiere.

In 1993, the company opened the Blackstone River Theatre at 1420 Broad Street in Central Falls, Rhode Island, converting the former Central Braid Complex mill into a 200‑seat performance venue.

- Blackstone River Theatre (Central Falls): Productions included A Christmas Carol (1993), True West (1993), The Hound of the Baskervilles (1993), Alice in Wonderland (1993), Deathtrap (1993), Dracula (1993), Hansel & Gretel (1994), Zorro (1994), Cyrano de Bergerac (1994), a Children’s Theatre Series, folk music concerts, and classic film screenings.

In July 1994, Beauregard and Seggerman announced the company’s closure after eleven seasons. The decision followed years of financial strain and the challenges of maintaining a permanent venue.

== Legacy ==
By the late 1980s, the Cumberland Company had become Rhode Island’s second-largest nonprofit theatre organization and a major cultural attraction in the Blackstone Valley. The company helped establish large-scale historical pageantry as part of the Blackstone Valley's heritage tourism initiatives during the 1980s and early 1990s and established the Blackstone River Theatre which later moved (Note: The theater moved in 2000 to 549 Broad Street in Cumberland, Rhode Island.) and is a thriving music venue.

Several alumni later worked professionally in stage combat, stunt coordination, academic theatre, and public history. Founder Normand Beauregard continued working as a fight master, stunt coordinator, and actor.
