= Nine Men's Misery =

Historic cemetery in Cumberland, Rhode Island

Nine Men's Misery Cemetery
- Rhode Island Historical Cemetery Cumberland #12
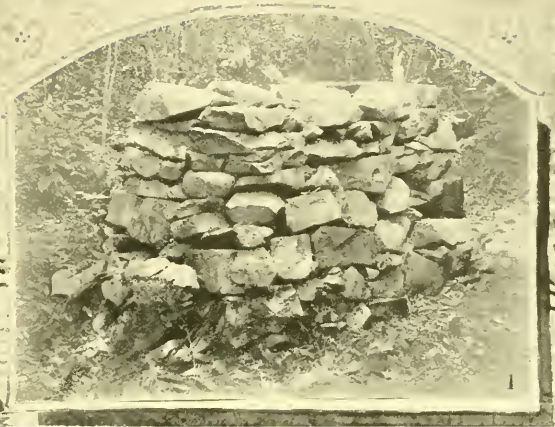
- Nine Men's Misery cairn, ca. 1894

- Location within Rhode Island

Details
- Established: 1676
- Location: 1464 Diamond Hill Road, Cumberland, Rhode Island
- Country: United States
- Coordinates: 41.93678°N 71.40780°W
- Type: Veterans
- Style: Cairn
- Owned by: Town of Cumberland
- No. of graves: 1 mass grave
- No. of interments: 9

Nine Men's Misery Cemetery is a historic cemetery in Cumberland, Rhode Island, marking the traditional mass grave of nine colonial soldiers said to have been captured and killed by Indigenous combatants in March 1676 during King Philip's War. The site is often described as one of the earliest colonial veterans' memorials in the United States.

Located within Monastery Park and registered as Rhode Island Historical Cemetery CU012, the cemetery was formally dedicated in 1928. Recent national attention has highlighted the ghostlore associated with the site.

== Background ==
On March 26, 1676, Captain Michael Pierce of Scituate, Massachusetts, led a force of English and allied Wampanoag soldiers into present-day Central Falls, Rhode Island, where they were drawn into an ambush by Narragansett combatants and overwhelmed after several hours of fighting. The battle was one of the most devastating defeats suffered by colonial forces during King Philip's War. A longstanding local tradition holds that nine English soldiers were captured and executed after the battle. Their bodies were later found and buried in a mass grave by fellow soldiers, who marked the site with a pile of stones.

== Site ==
=== Location ===
Nine Men's Misery Cemetery lies within Monastery Park off Diamond Hill Road in Cumberland, Rhode Island. It is roughly 3.3 miles north-northeast of the Pierce's Fight site, now memorialized in Central Falls, Rhode Island as Pierce Park and Riverwalk.

=== Historic-cemetery designation ===
Nine Men's Misery Cemetery is designated as Cemetery CU012 by the Rhode Island Advisory Committee on Historic Cemeteries. The cemetery description notes the state plaque added in 1928 and the stone cairn that was cemented into a permanent structure by the Trappist monks who once occupied the property.

== Historical accounts and later traditions ==
=== Seventeenth-century accounts ===
Four writers recorded Pierce's Fight close to the time it happened: Rehoboth minister Noah Newman, writing the day after the battle; Boston merchant Nathaniel Saltonstall, writing that July; Increase Mather, later in 1676; and William Hubbard, in 1677. Their casualty counts vary, but all describe a small, mixed English–Wampanoag force overwhelmed by a much larger Narragansett one, and all mention survivors who escaped the field.

None of the four accounts mentions any colonial soldier taken captive during the battle. They offer no basis for the Nine Men's Misery tradition, which appears only in much later sources.

=== Nineteenth-century tradition ===
The Nine Men's Misery narrative first appears in nineteenth‑century local histories, beginning with John Daggett’s 1834 History of Attleborough. Daggett wrote that nine militiamen became "separated from the main body" near "Camp Swamp" while pursuing a small group of Native warriors, after which they were surrounded and killed "on the spot." He stated that their comrades arrived too late to save them and buried the bodies beneath a heap of stones at the place where they fell, a site later known as Dead Men's Bones. Daggett noted that he received the story from "intelligent persons living in the vicinity" who were descendants of early settlers.

Daggett also reported that bones at the site were disinterred "not many years ago" by physicians, and that one skeleton was identified as Benjamin Bucklin (also spelled Buckland) of Rehoboth by the presence of "a set of double front teeth" (hyperdontia). Rehoboth’s official death register lists Benjamin Bucklin among those "slain on the 26th of March, 1676."

In the posthumous 1894 edition of Daggett’s history, completed by his daughter Amelia Daggett Sheffield, she added that her father had personally spoken with one of the physicians involved in the exhumation who had read his book. Sheffield wrote that the physician "was able to testify that [Daggett’s 1834 account] was substantially correct," noting that he had been "one of the 'medical gentlemen' present, aided in the exhumation, and finally examined the bones."

Leonard Bliss’s 1836 History of Rehoboth expanded the tradition and recorded three different oral accounts of the nine men’s fate. The first, quoted directly from Daggett, held that the men had strayed ahead of their party and were slain and buried where they fell. A second tradition placed the nine in advance of a Providence reinforcement party. A third tradition differed sharply, describing the men as captured survivors of Pierce’s Fight, tortured in a natural "amphitheatre," subjected to a war-dance, and finally "dispatched with the tomahawk" after their captors quarreled over how the torture should proceed. Bliss attributed this narrative to the testimony of a Native informant taken prisoner shortly afterward.

Bliss also repeated Daggett’s claim that some of the bones had been disinterred by Providence physicians—but around the time of the American Revolution—and that Bucklin was identified by his unusually large frame and "a set of double teeth all around." A Providence Journal article on January 20, 1886 echoed Bliss’s three-version history and added that the physicians included Dr. Bowen of Providence, claiming they exposed three skeletons before being driven off by local farmers.

William J. Miller’s 1880 Notes Concerning the Wampanoag Tribe repeated Bliss’s narrative in full and added a new claim that a skull from the site had once been taken to Brown University and displayed in its museum, where it "plainly shows the cut of the tomahawk," though Brown University has stated that it has no record of such an object.

=== Twentieth-century memorialization ===
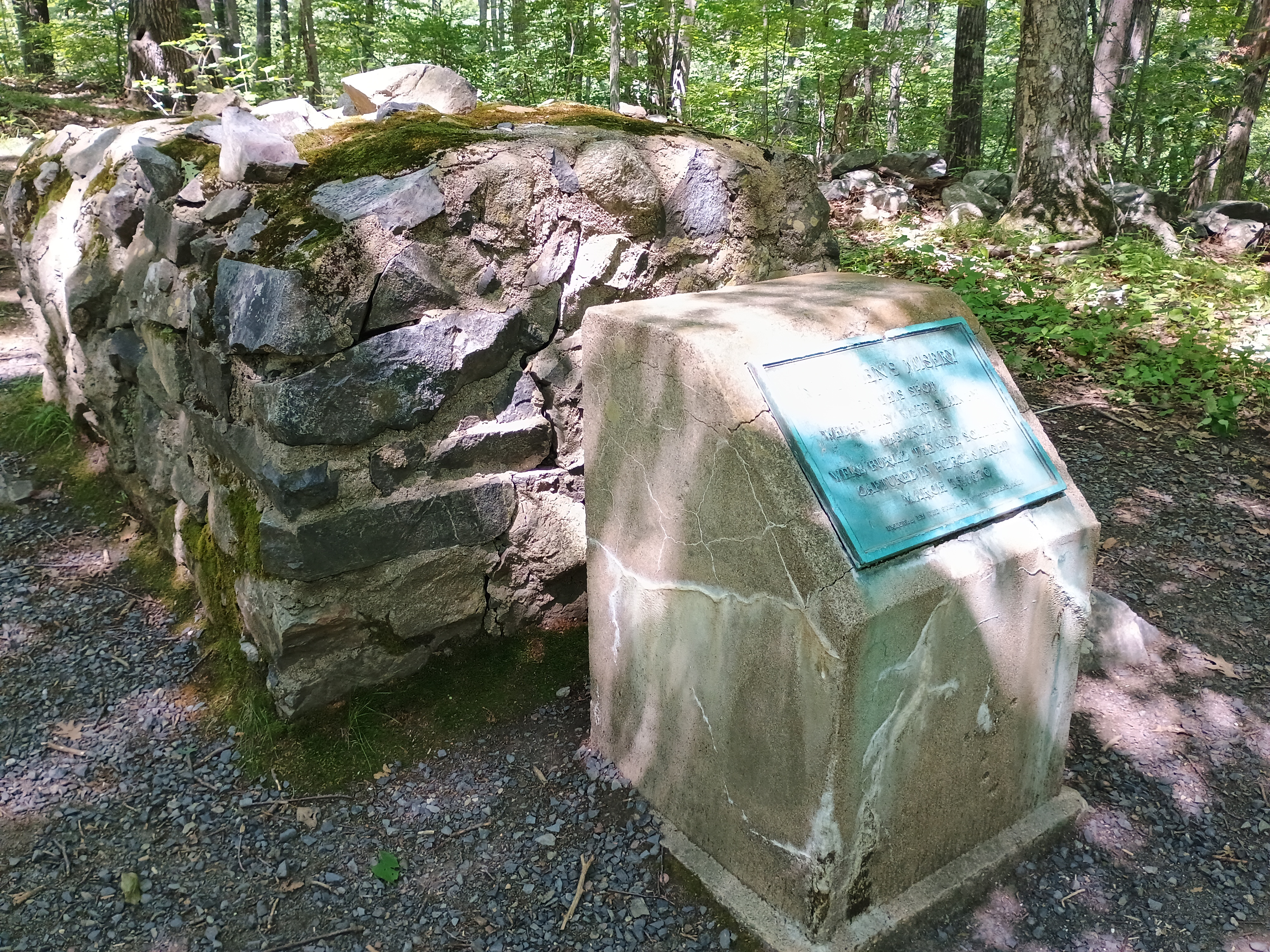
Nine Men's Misery cairn and plaque, 2026

The Rhode Island General Assembly's 1913 Report of the Committee on Marking Historical Sites—compiled by historian Wilfred H. Munro and containing a site description written by a descendant of Captain Michael Pierce—repeated Daggett’s version of the Nine Men's Misery tradition. The contributor wrote that the nine men "strayed ahead of their party, were surrounded and killed, and were buried where they fell," making no mention of Bliss’s later torture narrative. The author cautioned that "of what happened at Nine Men's Misery there is no real evidence."

Nine Men's Misery Cemetery was dedicated on November 11, 1928. The event drew state officials, local dignitaries, and monks from the then-active Our Lady of the Valley Monastery. Addison P. Munroe of the Rhode Island Historical Society (RIHS) delivered the principal address. The installed plaque bears the inscription: "Nine Men's Misery. On this spot, where they were slain by the Indians, were buried the nine soldiers captured in Pierce’s Fight, March 26, 1676. Erected by the State of Rhode Island, 1928."

According to Father Laurence Bourget—a monk interviewed by researcher Victor Franko and who resided at the monastery from 1933 until its closure in 1950 — the remains at Nine Men's Misery were removed about 1938 from the site due to vandalism and taken away for safekeeping. The RIHS later returned the remains to the town of Cumberland for reinterment at the site, likely in 1976, based on recollections by RIHS president Albert Klyberg. (Note: In 2014, the History Channel series Search for the Lost Giants revisited the site, with investigators seeking witnesses to the 1976 reinternment who might have seen the remains firsthand to verify the Bucklin identification. Albert Klyberg, then president of the RIHS and who had transported the crate of bones, stated that he had "never looked inside" and could not confirm its contents.)

On March 27, 1976, the Preservation Society of Cumberland and the Rhode Island Bicentennial Commission held a ceremony at Monastery Park marking the 300th anniversary of King Philip’s War and the Nine Men’s Misery Cemetery. Chaired by Stephen N. Adams, the event included an ecumenical service, music by the Pawtuxet Rangers, participation by Narragansett representatives, followed by a wreath‑laying procession led by Cumberland Boy Scouts.

=== Ghostlore ===
The site has become a recurring subject in ghostlore and paranormal media. In 2014, Syfy’s Ghost Hunters investigated the Monastery Park grounds, presenting an embellished nineteenth-century torture narrative and attributing hauntings to both the slain colonists and the monks who later occupied the property. The episode described the nine men as having been "skinned alive, beheaded and their heads were placed on stakes." They claimed there were "bizarre temperature fluctuations" and that their EMF reader went "haywire" at the gravesite.

Local and regional media have continued to frame the Nine Men's Misery Cemetery as a haunted site. Yankee Magazine’s 2022 feature on Nine Men's Misery repeated nineteenth-century claims of torture, described visions of phantom horses, disembodied voices, and a "giant gnashing his double rows of teeth," and linked these stories to the eighteenth-century disinterment.

== Historiographical perspectives ==
Modern historians have examined the Nine Men’s Misery tradition as part of the evolving memory of King Philip’s War. Jill Lepore and Laurence LaCroix note that the burial narrative emerged in nineteenth‑century antiquarian writing that blended limited documentation with local oral tradition, producing a story shaped more by later commemorative needs than by seventeenth‑century evidence.

Lepore argues in The Name of War (1998) that remembrance of the war was influenced by the absence of Native‑authored records, allowing colonial writers to define how events were remembered. She writes that nineteenth‑century retellings "turned suffering into identity," recasting colonial losses as sacred sacrifice and Native resistance as savagery.

Ella Sekatau, a Narragansett ethnohistorian and medicine woman, stated that, in Narragansett tribal memory, the killing of the nine colonial soldiers was understood as retaliation for the Great Swamp Massacre of 1675, in which hundreds of Narragansett noncombatants were killed. In a 2003 documentary, Sekatau described the soldiers as having been "left on the rock...some without their hair and some without their heads," presenting the account as part of the Narragansett oral tradition concerning the incident.

LaCroix’s analysis in Captain Pierce’s Fight (2011) focuses on the evidentiary basis for the tradition. He accepts that colonial soldiers were buried in Cumberland and that one of the exhumed skeletons was almost certainly Benjamin Bucklin, whose death record places him among those killed on the day of Pierce’s Fight. LaCroix writes that the Nine Men’s Misery tradition “has truth in it,” but emphasizes that it is unclear where the soldiers were killed and that later claims of torture "lack documentary and archaeological support."

== See also ==
- King Philip's War
- Cumberland, Rhode Island
- Monastery Park (Cumberland, Rhode Island)

== Citations ==
- Arnold, James N. (1897). Vital Record of Rehoboth, 1642–1896: Marriages, Intentions, Births, Deaths, with Supplement Containing the Church Records of the First Congregational Church of Rehoboth. Providence, Rhode Island: Narragansett Historical Publishing Company.
- Bliss, Leonard (1836). The History of Rehoboth, Bristol County, Massachusetts. Boston: Otis, Broaders & Company.
- Daggett, John (1834). Sketch of the History of Attleborough: From Its Settlement to the Present Time. Attleborough, Massachusetts: H. Mann, Printer.
- Daggett, John (1894). Sheffield, Amelia Daggett (ed.). Sketch of the History of Attleborough: From Its Settlement to the Present Time (PDF). Providence, Rhode Island: Press of S. S. Rider.
- Franko, Victor (2003). "Nine Men's Misery: Part Two, the Historical Research" (PDF). Bucklin Society.
- "Nine Men's Misery". Ghost Hunters. Season 9. Episode 22. 2014-02-26. Syfy.
- "Nine Men's Misery — Season 9, Episode 22". SYFY. NBCUniversal. February 26, 2014.
- Guertin, Jayne (2022-06-02). "Nine Men's Misery: A Historic (and Possibly Haunted) Site in Cumberland, RI". Yankee Magazine.
- Historical Marker Database. "Nine Men's Misery". HMdb.org.
- Historical Marker Database. "Pierce Park and Riverwalk". HMdb.org.
- Hubbard, William (1677). The Present State of New-England: Being a Narrative of the Troubles with the Indians in New-England. London: Tho. Parkhurst.
- LaCroix, Lawrence K. (2011). Captain Pierce's Fight: An Investigation Into a King Philip's War Battle and its Remembrance and Memorialization (Master's thesis). University of Massachusetts Boston.
- Lepore, Jill (1998). The Name of War: King Philip's War and the Origins of American Identity. Knopf Doubleday Publishing Group. ISBN 9780307488572.
- Malloy, William E. (2004). "Nine Men's Misery: A Historical Review". Rhode Island History. 62 (2): 45–60.
- Mather, Increase (1676). A Brief History of the War with the Indians in New-England. London: Richard Chiswell. p. 25.
- Miller, William J. (1880). Notes Concerning the Wampanoag Tribe. Cumberland, Rhode Island: Published by the author.
- "Rev. Laurence Bourget". Morin Funeral Homes. J. Henri Morin & Son Funeral Home. December 2014.
- Newman, Noah (1859). Letter to the Governor and Council of Plymouth Colony, March 27, 1676. Boston: In: Shurtleff, Nathaniel B., ed., Records of the Colony of New Plymouth in New England, vol. 10. pp. 297–298.
- "Nine Men's Misery". The Providence Daily Journal. Providence, Rhode Island. 1886-01-20. p. 10.
- "Memorial Honors Indians' Victims". Providence Journal. Providence, Rhode Island. 1928-11-13.
- Rhode Island General Assembly (1913). Report of the Committee on Marking Historical Sites in Rhode Island. Providence: State of Rhode Island.
- "Rhode Island Historical Cemetery CU012 – Nine Men's Misery Cemetery". Rhode Island Historical Cemeteries Database. Rhode Island Historic Cemetery Volunteers.
- Green, Marcia (2014-11-19). "Giants at Nine Men's Misery? History Channel investigators on the job". Valley Breeze.
- Adams, Stephen N. (1976). Nine Men’s Misery Commemorative Program (Report). Preservation Society of Cumberland, R.I.
- "Program to Commemorate 'Pierce Massacre'". Providence Journal. 1976-03-27.
- Durant, Frank (2003). Nine Men's Misery (Documentary film). Frank Durant.
