= Furnace Carolina Site =

- U.S. National Register of Historic Places
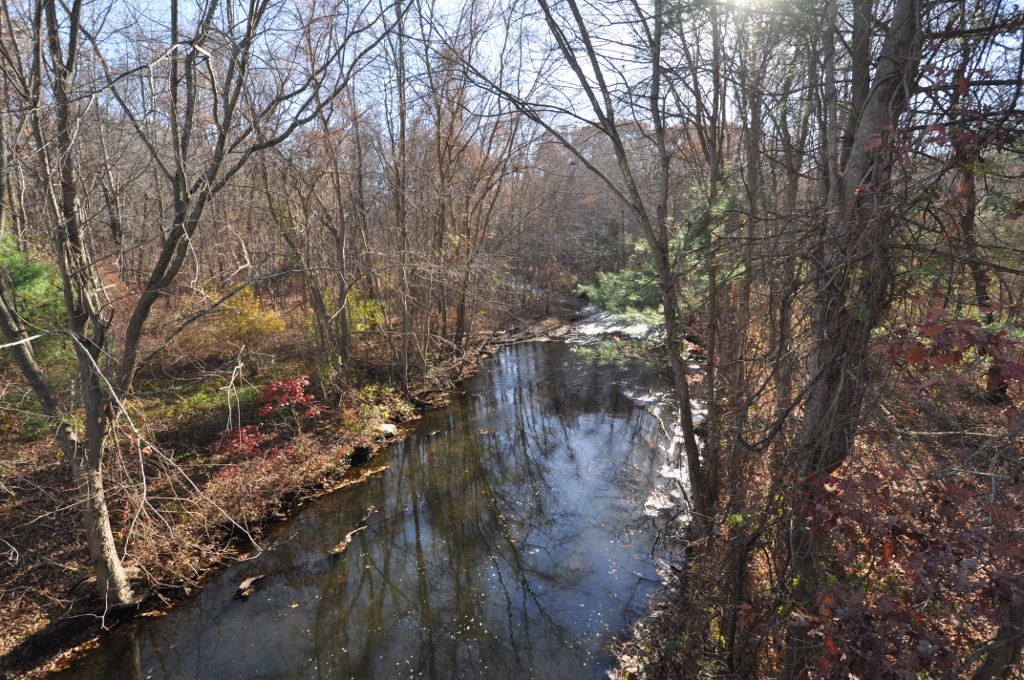
- The furnace was located in this wooded area below Arnold Mills village
- Location: Cumberland, Rhode Island
- Built: 1734
- Architect: Metcalf, Eliezer
- NRHP reference No.: 93000341
- Added to NRHP: May 10, 1993

The Furnace Carolina Site (also known as RI-2045; Abbott Run; Arnold Mills Furnace) is an historic site of a blast furnace in Cumberland, Rhode Island along the Abbott Run river.

== History ==
The colonial industrial furnace was originally built around 1734 by Eliezer Metcalf. The Furnace Carolina was named after Caroline of Ansbach, the wife of England's King George II. The furnace was located in an area with an abundance of iron ore and purportedly cast cannon for use during the French and Indian Wars. The site was added to the National Register of Historic Places in 1993.

== See also ==
- Arnold Mills Historic District
- National Register of Historic Places listings in Providence County, Rhode Island
