= St. Joseph's Church Complex (Cumberland, Rhode Island) =

Historic church in Rhode Island, United States

- U.S. National Register of Historic Places
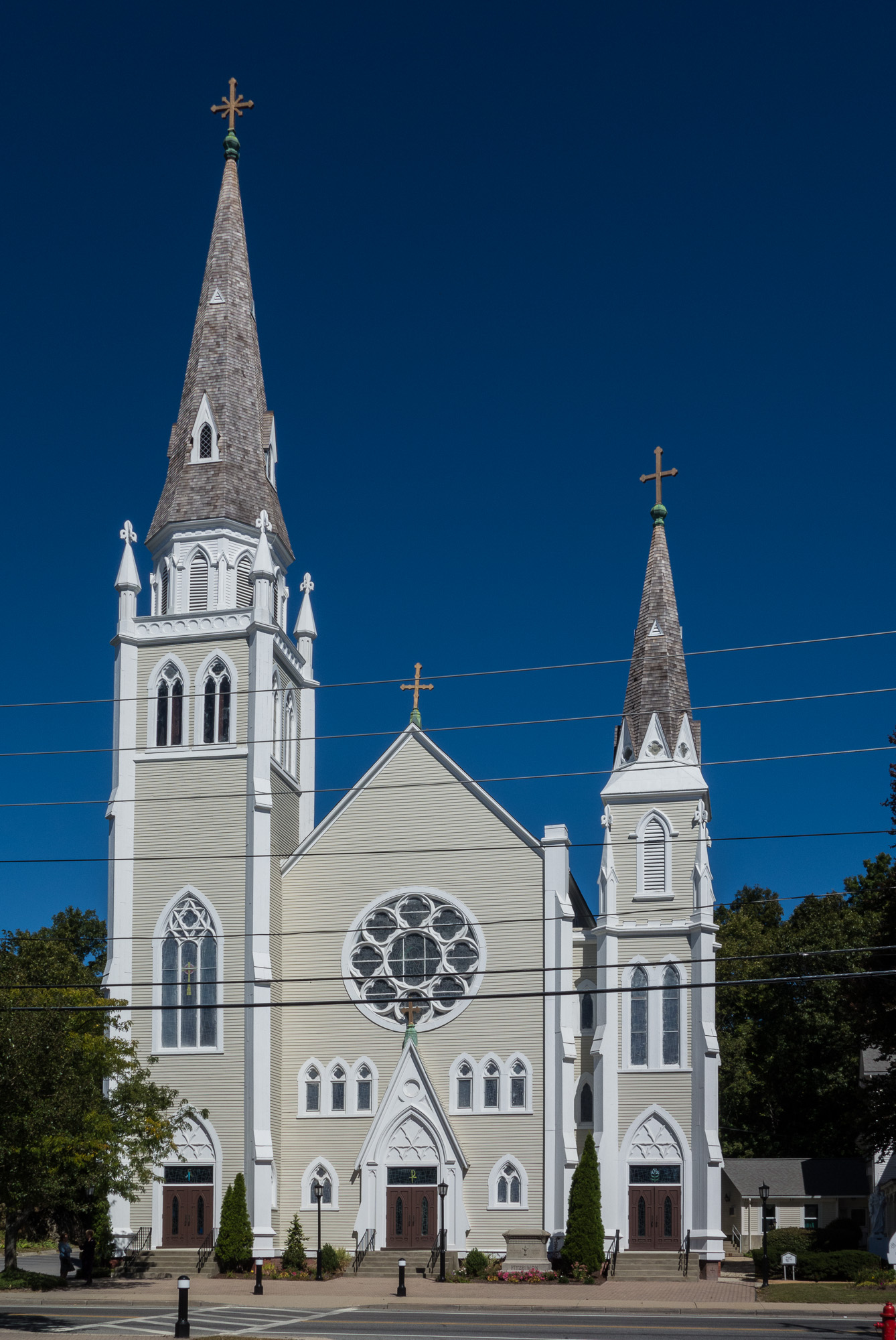
- St. Joseph's Church (2012)

- Location within Rhode Island Location within the United States
- Location: Cumberland, Rhode Island
- Coordinates: 41°56′3″N 71°25′40″W
- Built: 1890
- Built by: A. Richards
- Architect: James Murphy
- Architectural style: Gothic Revival
- Website: stjosephashtonri.org
- NRHP reference No.: 82000007
- Added to NRHP: August 12, 1982

St. Joseph Church is parish of the Roman Catholic Church in Cumberland, Rhode Island within the Diocese of Providence. It is known for its historic campus at 1303 Mendon Road, which includes a Gothic Revival style church, designed by James Murphy, along with two late 19th-century, clapboard-sheathed, wood-frame structures on the east side of Mendon Road. The church and its accompanying buildings were added to the National Register of Historic Places in 1982 as St. Joseph's Church Complex.

== History ==
St. Joseph's Parish, established in 1872 in an earlier church constructed on the present site, was, at that time, the only Roman Catholic church between Valley Falls and Woonsocket. It served an extensive parish centered on the Irish, and later French Canadian and Italian, mill laborers of nearby Ashton and Berkeley, as an important religious and social center. By 1888, the parish's growth necessitated construction of a new church, completed in 1890, which replaced the original. The original rectory and parish hall were retained. According to the State Survey put out by the Rhode Island Historical Preservation and Heritage Commission in 1998, the present church is one of the finest wooden Late Victorian religious edifices in Rhode Island. It was added to the National Register of Historic Places in 1982 and underwent an extensive and sensitive restoration in 1995.

== Architecture ==
The handsome, asymmetrical, twin-spired Gothic Revival St. Joseph's Church was designed in 1888 by James Murphy of Providence, (Note: F. E. Page of Woonsocket is incorrectly named as the architect in the NRHP nomination.) a prolific architect of Catholic churches. The building has a tall, end-gable-roof, rectangular mass with a polygonal, hip-roof apse at the northeast end. One-story, shed-roof side aisles continue around the apse as an ambulatory to connect to a projecting, rectangular chapel. The three-story, shorter corner tower has paired lancet windows, battlemented string courses, louver-filled Gothic arches, and is topped by a broach spire. The four-story tower has large, traceried Gothic windows, drip molds, and is surmounted by an octagonal belfry and spire.

St. Joseph's Rectory (c. 1872) is two to three stories in height with a modified cruciform plan. It is a well-preserved example of bracketed style domestic architecture, with a wrap-around veranda and applied ornament of carved brackets and jigsaw work. The interior has been modified.

The relatively plain parish hall (c. 1872) has been removed and a modern structure has been built at the rear of the property.

== Gallery ==
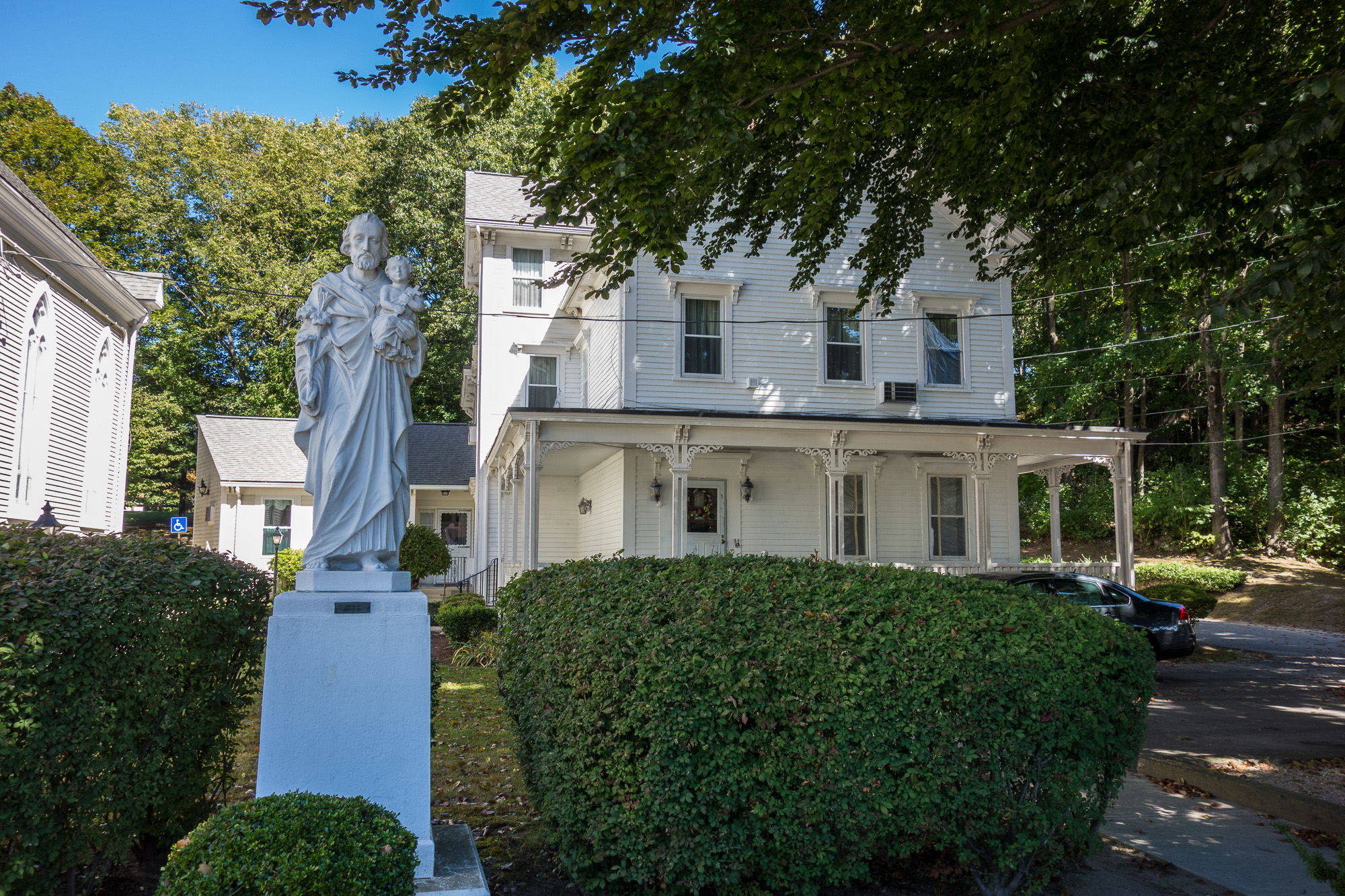

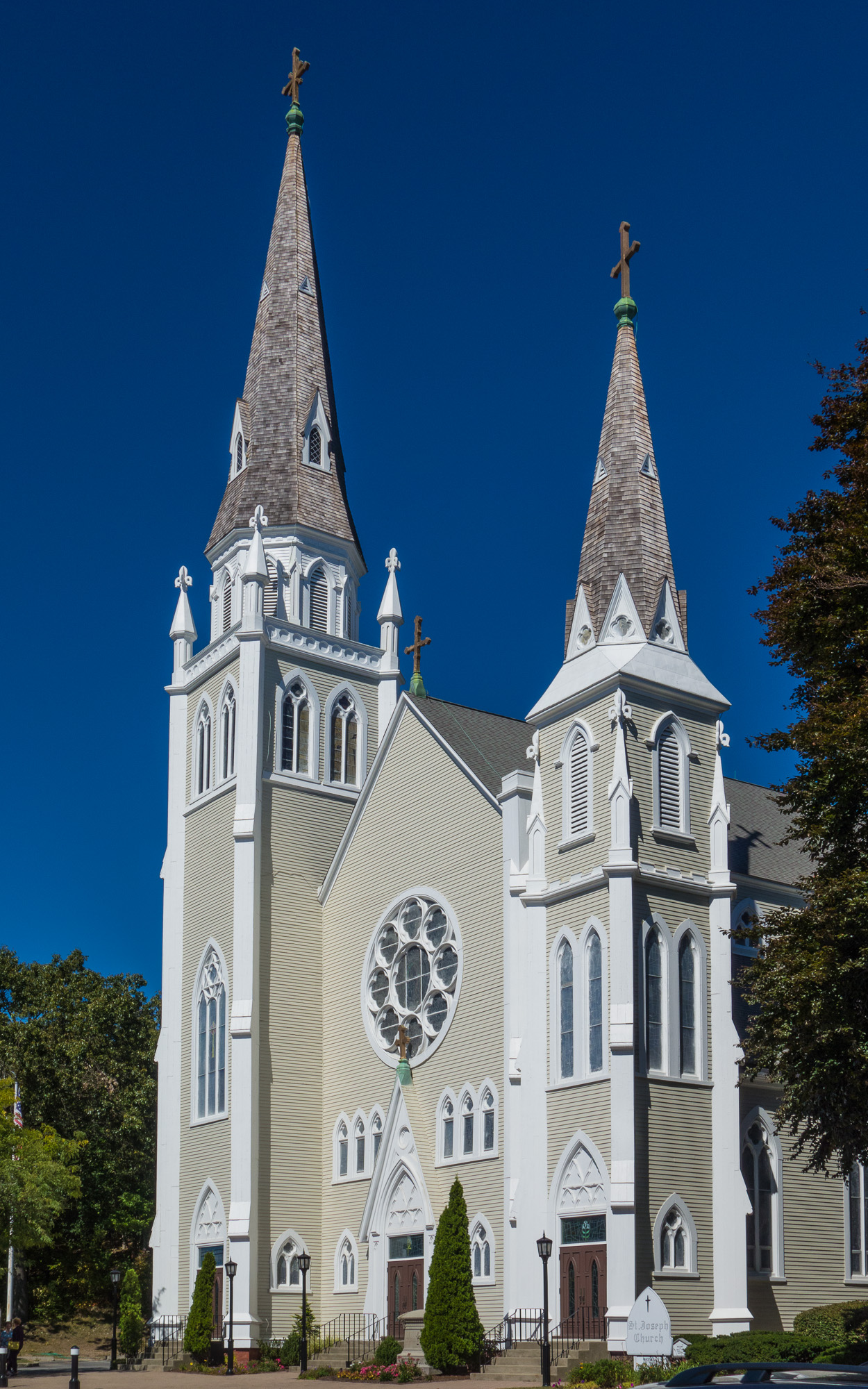

== See also ==
- National Register of Historic Places listings in Providence County, Rhode Island
