= Whipple–Jenckes House =

Historic house in Rhode Island, United States

- U.S. National Register of Historic Places
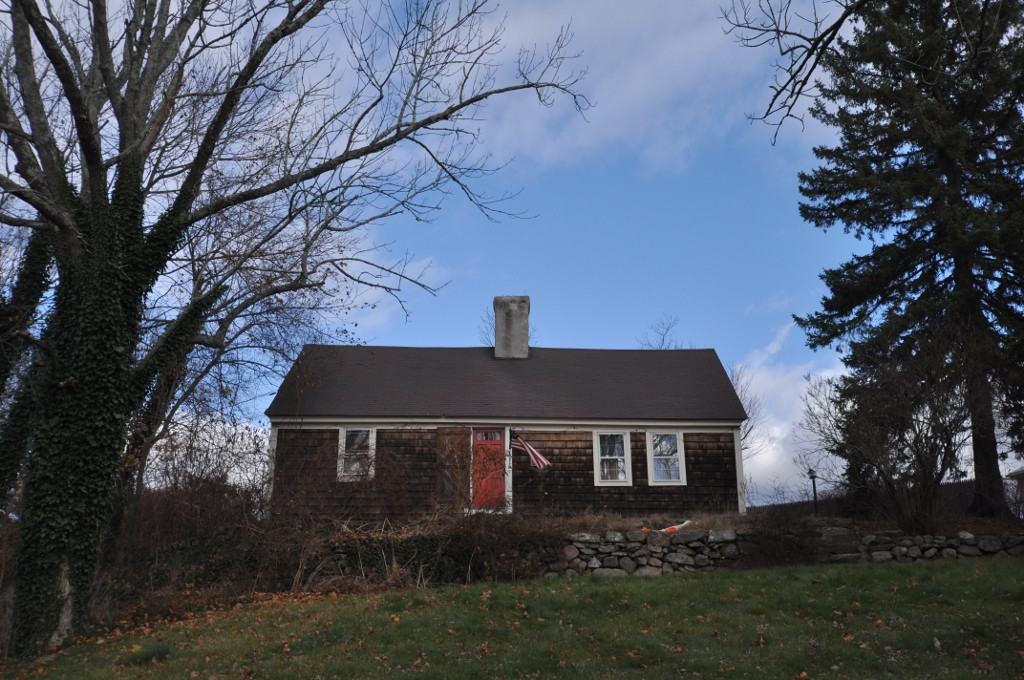

- Location within Rhode Island Location within the United States
- Location: Cumberland, Rhode Island
- Coordinates: 41°57′25.4″N 71°24′1.57″W
- Built: 1750
- Architectural style: Colonial
- NRHP reference No.: 92001541
- Added to NRHP: November 5, 1992

The Whipple–Jenckes House (Liberty Jenckes House) is a historic American Colonial house at the corner of Diamond Hill Road and Fairhaven Road in Cumberland, Rhode Island. The house was built around the year 1750, enlarged slightly in 1780, and added to the National Register of Historic Places in 1992.

The house is a very simple one-and-one-half-story, center-chimney cottage set behind stone walls on a large lot at the corner of Diamond Hill Road and Fairhaven Road. The asymmetrical, four-bay facade and slightly offset chimney testify that it was originally built as a half house and then later extended around 1780. The house served as the center of a small farm and cottage industries throughout most of its history. An earlier house on the site is said to have been a blockhouse during King Philip's War 1675–1677.

The Whipple–Jenckes House was constructed by Samuel Whipple beginning about 1750 when he inherited this property from his father, William Whipple, a direct descendant of John Whipple, one of the area's earliest settlers in the 1600s. At that time, the property also contained an earlier house, which is sometimes referred to in deeds as "Samuel Whipple’s old house" and in secondary sources as a "blockhouse". Its construction date is not known, but it stood immediately northeast of the present house well into the nineteenth century. Diamond Hill Road was one of the area's first primary north–south roads and is described in early deeds as the road between Providence, Rhode Island and Franklin, Massachusetts.

== Significance ==
The Whipple–Jenckes House is significant as a well-preserved example of mid-eighteenth-century rural vernacular domestic design, and illustrates the evolution of the half house to a full center chimney form. It is also of local historical interest for its broad associations with the development of the town of Cumberland. Built by a member of one of Cumberland's early settlement families, the house remained in that family for several generations, and became one locus of two of the town's important 19th- and 20th-century economic pursuits: small-scale boat building and farming.

== See also ==
- National Register of Historic Places listings in Providence County, Rhode Island
