= Metcalf–Franklin Farm =

Historic house in Rhode Island, United States

- U.S. National Register of Historic Places
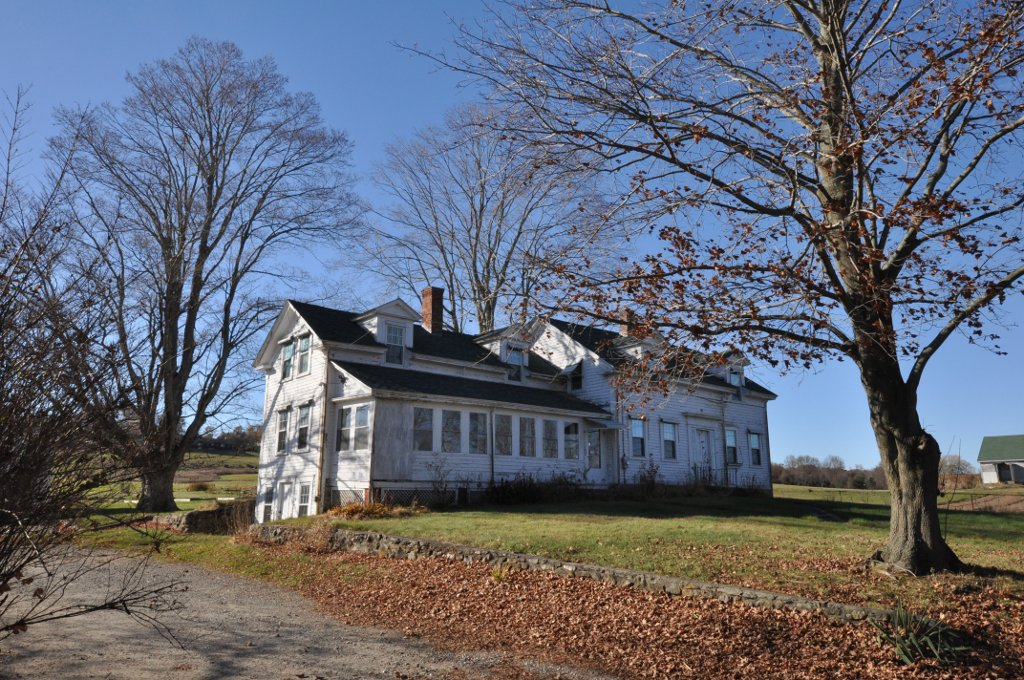

- Location within Rhode Island Location within the United States
- Location: 142 Abbott Run Valley Rd., Cumberland, Rhode Island
- Coordinates: 41.96598°N 71.39389°W
- Area: 63.4 acres (25.7 ha)
- Built: 1810
- Architectural style: Colonial, Greek Revival
- NRHP reference No.: 07000526
- Added to NRHP: June 07, 2007

The Metcalf–Franklin Farm is an historic farm that has been in operation since 1801 and is located at 142 Abbott Run Valley Road in Cumberland, Rhode Island. It has been farmed by two family owners, the Metcalf family (1801–1857) and the Franklin family (1857–2005). It consists of a small complex of farm buildings on two parcels of land, located on either side of Abbott Run Valley Road and totaling over 65.35 acres (26.45 ha)

== The Land ==
The property consists of two parcels of land which straddle Abbott Run Valley Road. On the west side, 46 acres of rolling hills and open fields are surrounded by mid 19th century field stone walls, cedar posts and wire fencing. A narrow stream runs from the northwest upper field, meandering gradually southeast until it runs under Abbott Run Valley Road and easterly into Rawson Pond. A small cattle pond is approximately 540 feet west of the farmhouse was used by the Metcalfs and Franklin for dairy cows.

On the East Side, 17 acres of rolling hills and open fields are surrounded on three sides by mid 19th century field stone walls and on the forth side by a paper road (Quaker Land) and Rawson Pond.

Both sides have been used for over 218 years for grazing cattle and growing hay, English hay, meadow hay, oats, corn and apples.

== The Barn Complex (ca. 1810, ca. 1860, ca. 1940 and ca. 1930) ==
The barn complex, comprising the Liberty Metcalf-William E. Franklin Barn and attached Franklin Cow Stable, was built on grade about eight feet west of a slight bend in Abbott Valley Run Road and approximately 350 feet north of the Franklin House. The Metcalf-Franklin Barn measures approximately 100 foot by 32 foot with an attached Cow Stable, measuring approximately 68-foot by 40-foot. The free-standing Equipment Storage Shed measures 40- foot by 20-foot. These gable-roofed buildings form a U-shaped courtyard with the west side open to the hillside field. Built in four sections, from ca. 1810 to ca. 1930, this barn complex is a virtual textbook of Rhode Island barn technology National Register of Historic Places

== The Farm House (circa 1857) ==
A late Greek Revival style was built by William E. Franklin. It is a 1 1/2-story with a flank-gable roof that faces Abbott Run Valley Road. It contains no central fireplaces and is believed to have had cast-iron coal stoves for its heating. A five-room modified floor plan is on the first floor, with basic 5-room floor plan on the second floor.

In 2016, the Town of Cumberland along with the Historic Metcalf–Franklin Farm Preservation Association received a grant to begin the preservation of the farmhouse.

== Current Use ==
Franklin Farm is currently under the management of The Historic Metcalf–Franklin Farm Preservation Association, a 501c3 organization whose goal is to preserve this historic site for future generations, provide educational opportunities for the community and support those who are experiencing food insecurities in RI by providing farm fresh vegetables through a community garden.

== Public Use ==
All members of the community are welcome to enjoy the beauty of the farm through passive recreation use. A permitted activities can be found in the Town of Cumberland Management Plans for the Franklin Farm . A hiking trail was marked by Eagle Scout AJ Welt (2015) and Eagle Scout Brian Sullivan (2006). GeoCache coordinates are also available on the property.

== Community Garden ==
Since 2005, Franklin Farm Community Garden has grown over 375,000 pounds of vegetables for the RI Community Food Bank and Local Food Pantries. It is run entirely by volunteers and welcomes new volunteers every new growing season. Volunteer nights are offered every Monday and Thursday, 5:30 pm- dusk from June to the end of September. No sign up is required, all ages welcome. Check in at the Garage for details on helping that evening.

The farm was added to the National Register of Historic Places in 2007. It is now owned by the town, and serves as a community gardening facility.

== See also ==
- National Register of Historic Places listings in Providence County, Rhode Island
