= Burlingame–Noon House =

Historic house in Rhode Island, United States

- U.S. National Register of Historic Places
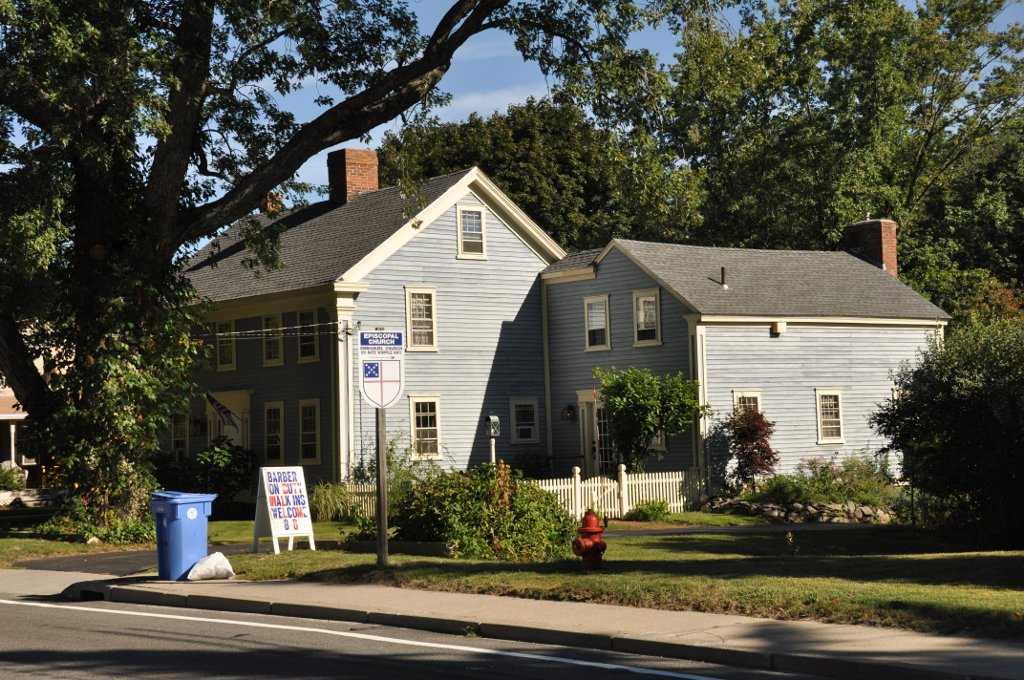

- Location within Rhode Island Location within the United States
- Location: 3261 Mendon Rd, Cumberland, Rhode Island
- Coordinates: 41°58′32″N 71°27′25″W
- Built: 1800
- Architectural style: Greek Revival
- NRHP reference No.: 74000048
- Added to NRHP: February 15, 1974

The Burlingame–Noon House is a historic house built around 1800 in Cumberland, Rhode Island.

The structure was originally a simple, one-and-one-half-story, five-room-plan, centre-chimney Federal style cottage, constructed in the first decades of the 19th century. In the middle of the century, it was enlarged into a two-and-one half-story, flank-gable Greek Revival house. It has panelled corner pilasters and a trabeated central entrance with sidelights and pilasters in a five-bay facade. The house has had few changes since the mid-nineteenth century and is notable for its architecture, including original Federal-period interior trim, which reflects transformations and adaptation in Cumberland's early history.

The house was added to the National Register of Historic Places in 1974.

== See also ==
- National Register of Historic Places listings in Providence County, Rhode Island
