= Luke Jillson House =

Historic house in Rhode Island, United States

- U.S. National Register of Historic Places
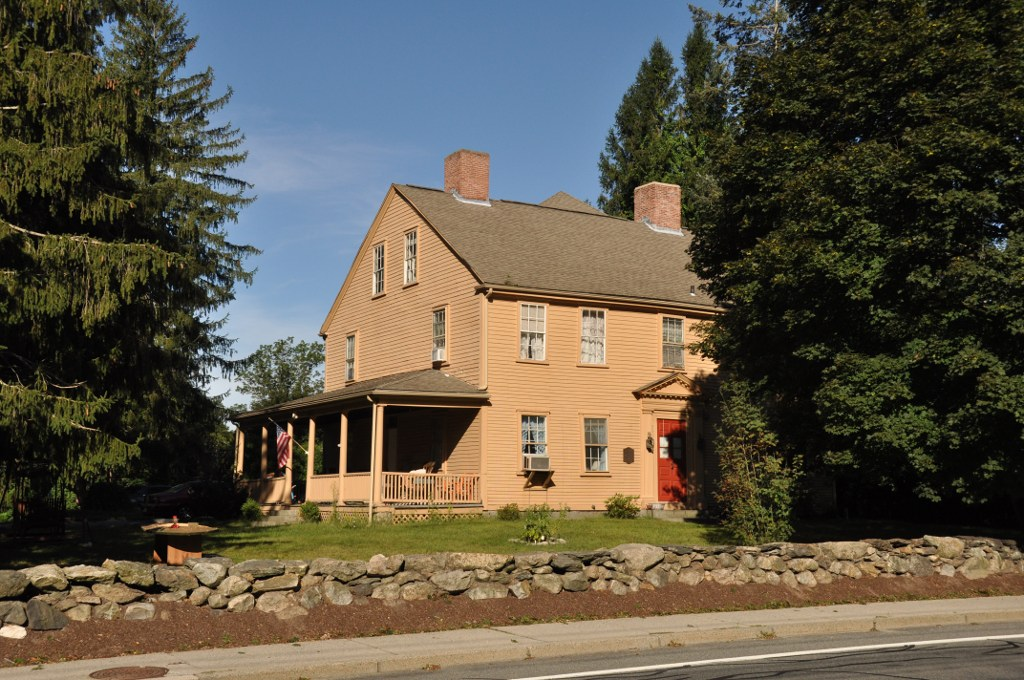

- Location within Rhode Island Location within the United States
- Location: 2510 Mendon Road, Cumberland, Rhode Island
- Coordinates: 41°57′41″N 71°26′41″W
- Architectural style: Georgian
- NRHP reference No.: 82000141
- Added to NRHP: August 12, 1982

The Luke Jillson House, also known as the Fisk House, is a historic house in Cumberland, Rhode Island. The wood-frame house is an excellent local example of Georgian style. Although a common date given for its construction is 1752, it was more likely built c. 1776 or in 1792, based on stylistic evidence.

The house is two and one-half stories tall with a flank gable roof and two interior brick chimneys, reflecting a central hall plan. The entrance, centered in a five-bay facade, has fluted pilasters supporting a cushion frieze surmounted by a modillion-trimmed cornice and pediment. A four-story, square, Italianate tower, constructed in the 19th century and connecting to a long, one-story addition, is attached to the rear elevation.

The dwelling is noted primarily for its architecture, which attests to the reputed affluence and prominence of Luke Jillson, about whom little is known. It was added to the National Register of Historic Places in 1982.

== See also ==
- National Register of Historic Places listings in Providence County, Rhode Island
