= Fricke v. Lynch =

Rhode Island LGBT court case 1980

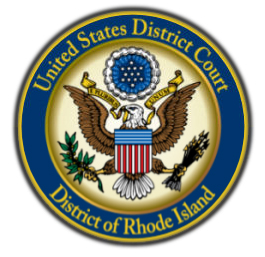
- Court: United States District Court for the District of Rhode Island
- Full case name: Aaron Fricke v. Richard B. Lynch, in his official capacity as Principal of Cumberland High School
- Decided: May 28, 1980
- Docket nos.: Civ. A. No. 80-214
- Citation: 491 F. Supp. 381

Court membership
- Judge sitting: Raymond James Pettine

Keywords
- LGBT rights

Fricke v. Lynch, 491 F. Supp. 381 (D.R.I. 1980), was a decision in the United States District Court for the District of Rhode Island that upheld the right of Aaron Fricke to bring a same-sex date to a high school dance. The Court ruled that existing free speech doctrine protected gay and lesbian students' rights to attend their proms with same-sex dates of their choice. The case was "one of the first successful victories in the courtroom for an LGBT issue involving young people, and is routinely cited each year in numerous cases surrounding the rights of students to bring same-sex dates to school functions."

== Background ==
In April 1979, a gay high school junior named Paul Guilbert sought his principal's permission to bring a male date, Ed Miskevich, a senior at Brown University, to his junior prom at Cumberland High School in Rhode Island. The principal, Richard Lynch, "denied the request, fearing that student reaction could lead to a disruption at the dance and possibly to physical harm to Guilbert." The Cumberland School Department denied a public hearing to Paul Guilbert because his father opposed his plan to attend with a male date. Guilbert and Miskevich did not attend the prom.

The next year, Guilbert's friend Aaron Fricke, who was also a gay student at Cumberland High School, again asked Lynch for permission to bring a same-sex date to a school dance. Lynch denied the request in a letter to Fricke citing the "real and present threat of physical harm to [Fricke], [his] male escort and to others."

Lynch also wrote that "the adverse effect among [Fricke's] classmates, other students, the School and the Town of Cumberland, which is certain to follow approval of such a request for overt homosexual interaction (male or female) at a class function" was sufficient ground for rejecting the request.

Fricke, represented by John Ward of Gay & Lesbian Advocates & Defenders, filed suit in the United States District Court for the District of Rhode Island, seeking a preliminary injunction that would allow him to attend the dance.

== Decision ==
The Court, accepting Fricke's freedom of speech claim, decided that "even a legitimate interest in school discipline does not outweigh a student's right to peacefully express his views in an appropriate time, place, and manner." The Court wrote that threats of physical violence against Fricke and his date gave homophobic students an unconstitutional "heckler's veto" that would allow "them to decide through prohibited and violent methods what speech will be heard."

The judge ruled that the precedent of United States v. O'Brien, 391 U.S. 367, 88 S. Ct. 1673, 20 L. Ed. 2d 672 (1968), was the appropriate framework for judging the constitutionality of Lynch's decision. O'Brien required that the government and its agents pursue the "least restrictive alternative" before making any decision to limit free speech. The judge ruled that Lynch's decision failed to meet the requirement of O'Brien because the school could have taken "appropriate security measures to control the risk of harm" and the principal had not made "any effort to determine the need for and logistics of additional security." The judge ruled that "the First Amendment requires that such steps" be taken to investigate and implement security measures.

The Court found the free speech claim to be dispositive and did not address Fricke's free association and equal protection arguments. With the respect to equal protection arguments, the court noted that "the school [had] afforded disparate treatment to a certain class of students" by setting up different policies for those who wished to bring same-sex partners to the dance and those who wanted to bring different-sex partners. Such a policy, the Court said, could be "profitably analyzed under the Equal Protection Clause of the Fourteenth Amendment."

== Aftermath ==
On May 31, 1980, the press reports said that "Amid heavy security, homosexual student Aaron Fricke showed up at the senior prom with a male companion. Both wore tuxedos." Lynch addressed the senior class earlier in the day and promised to respond to any harassment of the couple with "very stern measures." The school provided six rather than the customary two police officers for security. Some students taunted the couple when they danced together.

Following Fricke, American public high schools have increasingly allowed gay and lesbian students to attend school functions with their same-sex partners. In 2004, Murray High School in Utah prohibited same-sex students from participating in the promenade of their prom. Press coverage noted the similarity to Fricke's case. Using Fricke as a precedent, the ACLU threatened to sue the high school on behalf of its gay and lesbian students. The high school reversed its policy and allowed 17-year-old lesbian Heather Johnston to dance with her girlfriend at the prom.

In 2010, Itawamba Agricultural High School in Mississippi canceled its prom after pupil Constance McMillen asked to attend with her girlfriend and wear a tuxedo. She reported hostility from other students over the cancellation, and sued the school.

== See also ==
- Hall v Durham Catholic School Board: A similar case in Canada
- 2010 Itawamba County School District prom controversy
