= John Cole Farm =

- U.S. National Register of Historic Places
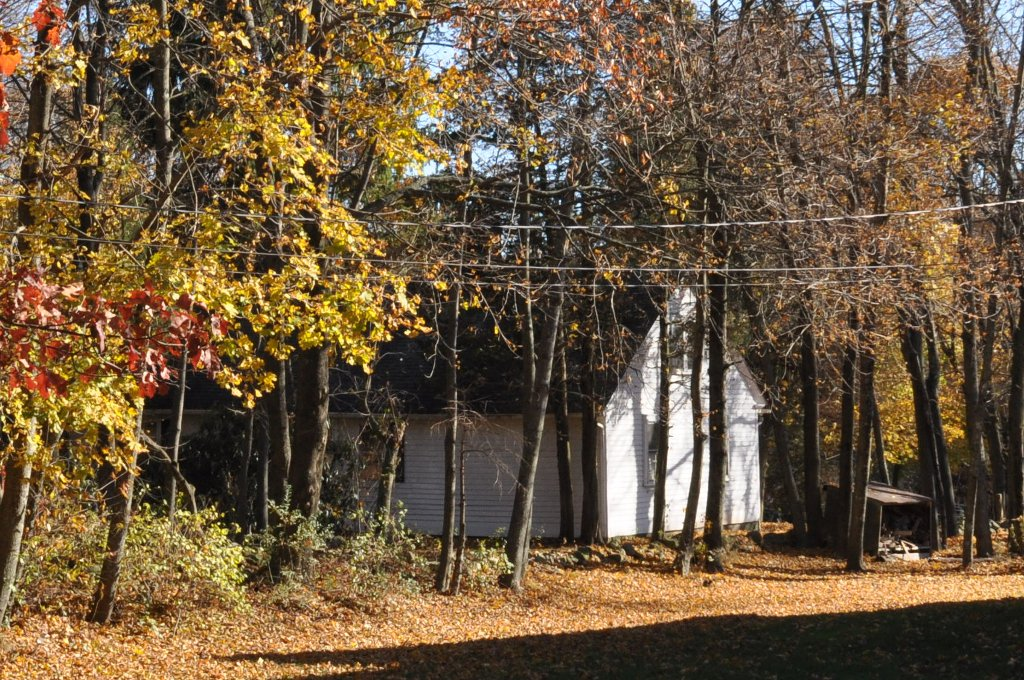

- Location within Rhode Island Location within the United States
- Location: Cumberland, Rhode Island
- Coordinates: 41°59′26″N 71°24′24″W
- Area: 4.3 acres (1.7 ha)
- Built: 1770
- NRHP reference No.: 77000025
- Added to NRHP: August 16, 1977

The John Cole Farm (also known as Intervale Farm) is an historic colonial farm on Reservoir Road in the far northeast of Cumberland, Rhode Island. The main farmhouse, a 1 1/2-story Cape style wood-frame structure, was built c. 1770 by John Cole not long after his acquisition of the property. The property, including a half-dozen outbuildings, has had only minimal intrusion of modern 20th-century amenities, and is a well-kept example of vernacular rural architecture of the late 18th century.

The farm was listed on the National Register of Historic Places in 1977.

== See also ==
- National Register of Historic Places listings in Providence County, Rhode Island
