= Tower–Flagg Barn Complex =

- U.S. National Register of Historic Places
- Location within Rhode Island Location within the United States
- Location: Cumberland, Rhode Island
- Coordinates: 41°57′33″N 71°23′34″W
- NRHP reference No.: 98000574
- Added to NRHP: May 20, 1998

The Tower–Flagg Barn Complex is (or was) a historic site in Cumberland, Rhode Island at 100 Abbott Run Valley Road. Its most significant feature was a barn complex whose oldest section was an English barn that was probably constructed in the second half of the 18th century. If so, it would have been built by Benjamin Tower, whose family owned the land from the late 17th century into the early 19th century. In 1895 the property was acquired by Charles Flagg, notable in Rhode Island as influential in the founding of what is now the University of Rhode Island.

The property was listed on the National Register of Historic Places in 1998. C. 2013, the property had been cleared of old buildings and a new residential subdivision was built on the land.

== See also ==
- National Register of Historic Places listings in Providence County, Rhode Island
