= Lewis Tower House =

Historic house in Rhode Island, United States

- U.S. National Register of Historic Places
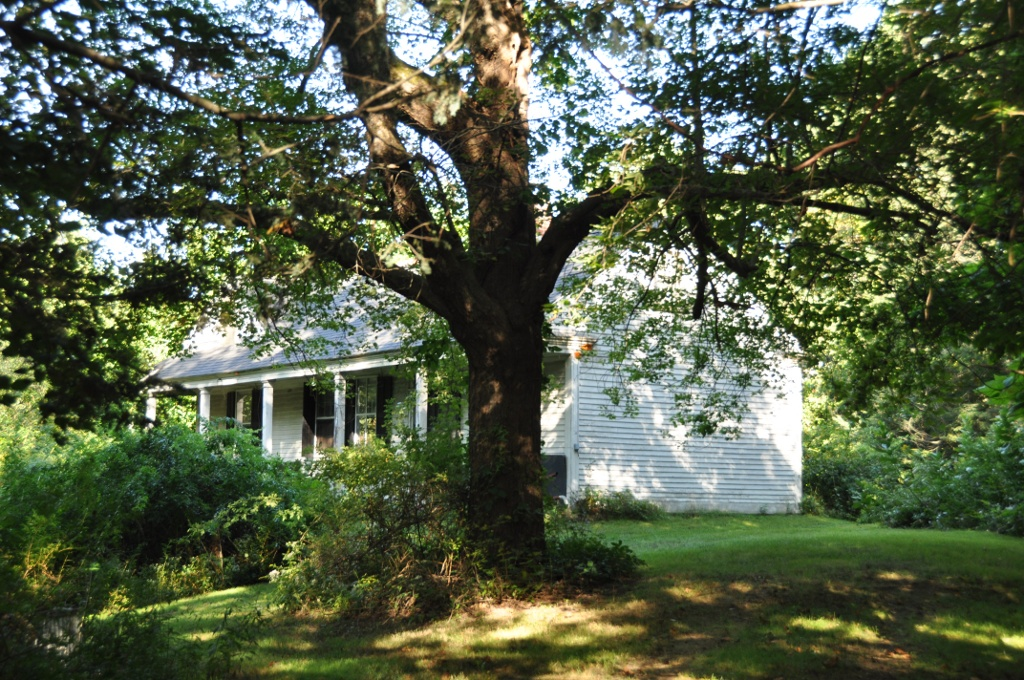

- Location within Rhode Island Location within the United States
- Location: 2199 Mendon Road, Cumberland, Rhode Island
- Coordinates: 41°57′14″N 71°26′33″W
- Built: 1825
- Architectural style: Federal
- NRHP reference No.: 82000010
- Added to NRHP: August 30, 1982

The Lewis Tower House is an historic house in Cumberland, Rhode Island.

Built c. 1825, it is a Federal style house that is two-and-one-half-stories with a flank gable roof and an L-plan. The house is set into a small hill and has a one-and-one half-story, gabled ell at the rear. An original, two-story, hip-roof veranda extends across the front; its second story level continues along the side and ell. The veranda roof slope is integral with those of the main house and ell. There is a central entrance on each story in the five-bay facade beneath the veranda; the second-story entrance has sidelights and decorative trim. The house was probably standing when Lewis Tower purchased a 19-acre farmstead here from Philip Thomas in 1833.

The house was added to the National Register of Historic Places in 1982.

== See also ==
- National Register of Historic Places listings in Providence County, Rhode Island
