= Arnold Mills Historic District =

Historic district in Rhode Island, United States

Coordinates: 41°58′46.53″N 71°23′37.51″W

- U.S. National Register of Historic Places
- U.S. Historic district
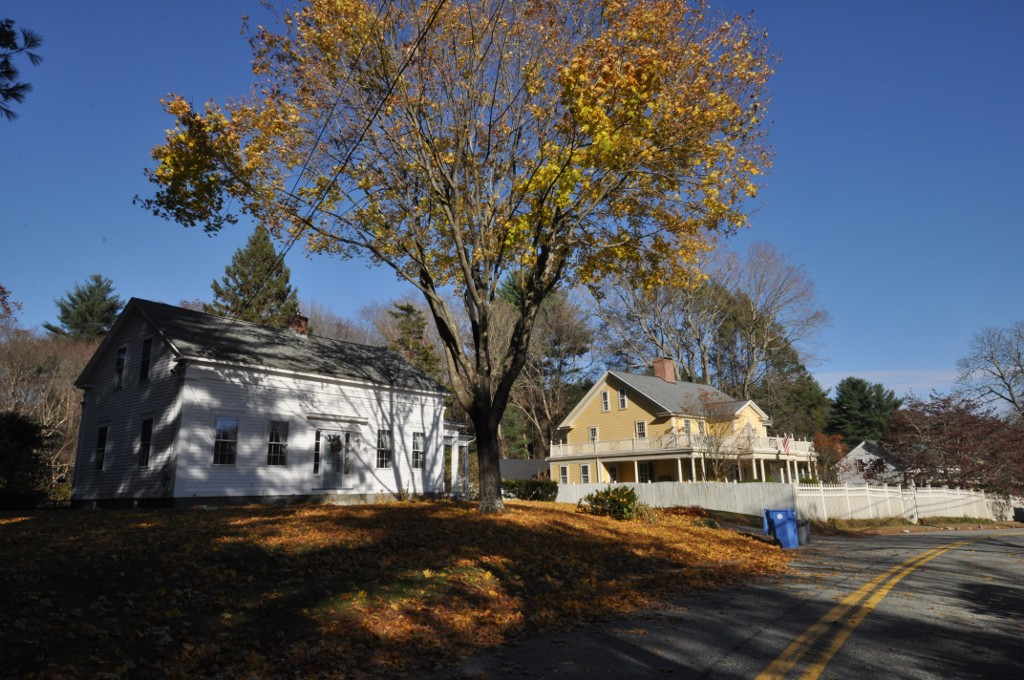
- Houses on Sneech Pond Road

- Location within Rhode Island Location within the United States
- Location: Cumberland, Rhode Island
- Area: 100 acres (40 ha)
- Architectural style: Greek Revival, Late Victorian, Federal
- NRHP reference No.: 78000070
- Added to NRHP: December 28, 1978

Arnold Mills Historic District is a historic district encompassing a modest 19th-century mill village in eastern Cumberland, Rhode Island. The district lies along the Nate Whipple Highway (Rhode Island Route 120) and Sneech Pond Road, south of the Arnold Mills Reservoir. Sneech Pond Road was formerly the major east-west highway through the area prior to the construction of the Nate Whipple Highway in the 1960s. The Arnold Mills village is in part bisected by Abbott Run, the stream which serves as the outlet of the reservoir; Sneech Pond Road crosses the run on an early 20th-century steel Pratt pony truss, now closed to vehicular traffic. The houses along this road generally date from the late 18th to mid-19th century, and mainly reflect Federal and Greek Revival styling. The most prominent structure in the district is the Arnold Mills United Methodist Church, located at the western end of the district on Nate Whipple Highway; it was built 1825-27 and remodeled in 1846.

The district was listed on the National Register of Historic Places in 1978.

== See also ==
- National Register of Historic Places listings in Providence County, Rhode Island
