= Berkeley Mill Village =

Coordinates: 41.929916°N 71.422702°W

- U.S. National Register of Historic Places
- U.S. Historic district
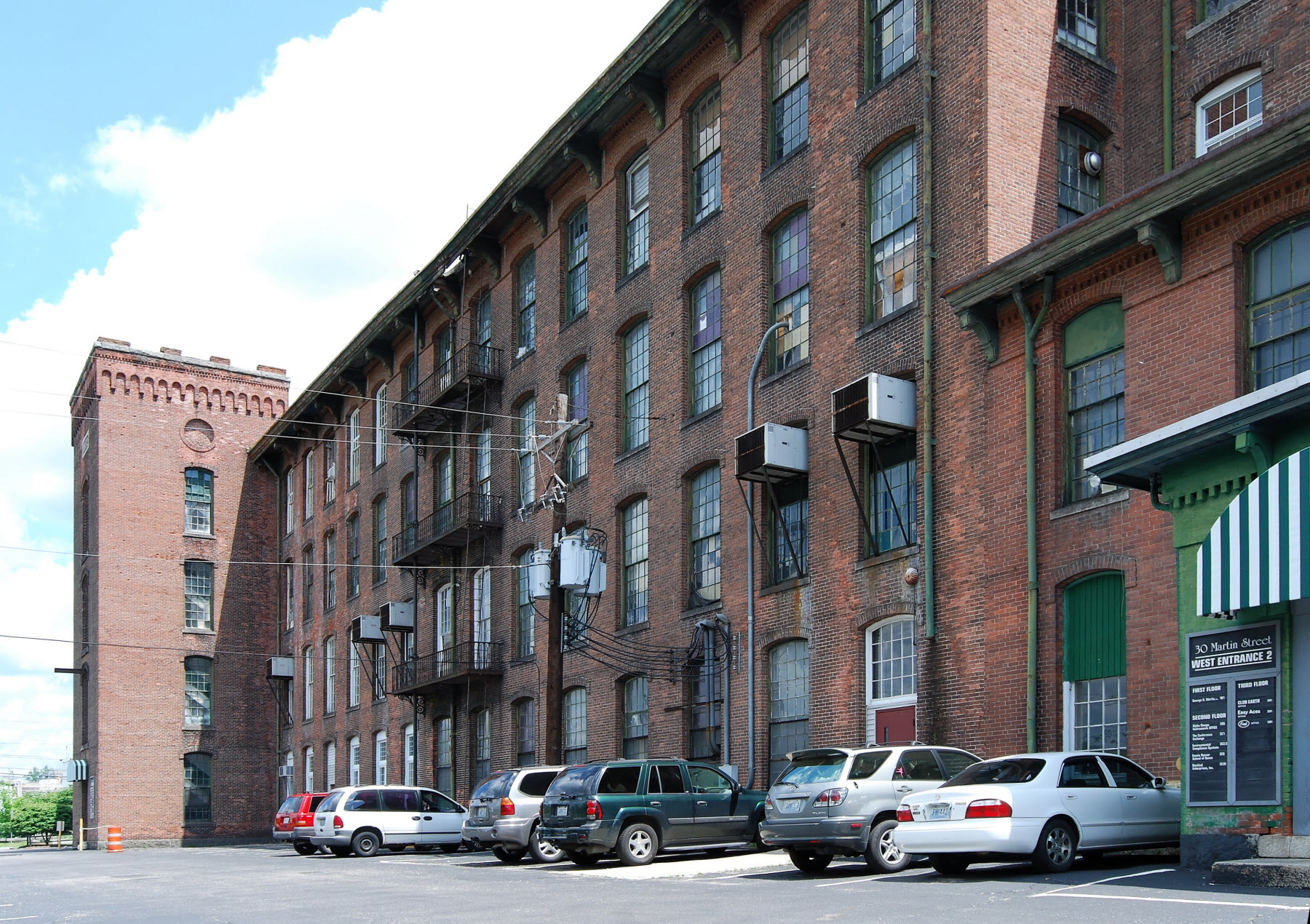
- Berkeley Mill complex at 30 Martin Street

- Location within Rhode Island Location within the United States
- Location: Cumberland (Berkeley), Rhode Island
- Area: 125 acres (51 ha)
- Built: 1872
- Architectural style: Romanesque
- NRHP reference No.: 72000036
- Added to NRHP: February 23, 1972

Berkeley Mill Village is a historic district encompassing the mill village of Berkeley in Cumberland, Rhode Island. The village is roughly bounded by Martin Street and Mendon Road on the north and east, railroad tracks to the west, and St. Joseph Cemetery to the south. The village, including a mill complex and mill employee housing, was built in 1872 by the Lonsdale Company. Most of the residential structures built are two-story brick duplexes, although Mendon Street is lined with a number of fine Queen Anne Victorian houses. A c. 1892 stick-style church building (now used for non-religious purposes), stands on Mendon Street at the northern end of the district.

In 1922, its textile mills were temporarily shutdown by the New England Textile Strike over an attempted wage cut and hours increase.

The district was added to the National Register of Historic Places in 1972.

== See also ==
- National Register of Historic Places listings in Providence County, Rhode Island
