= Cumberland Public Library =

- U.S. National Register of Historic Places
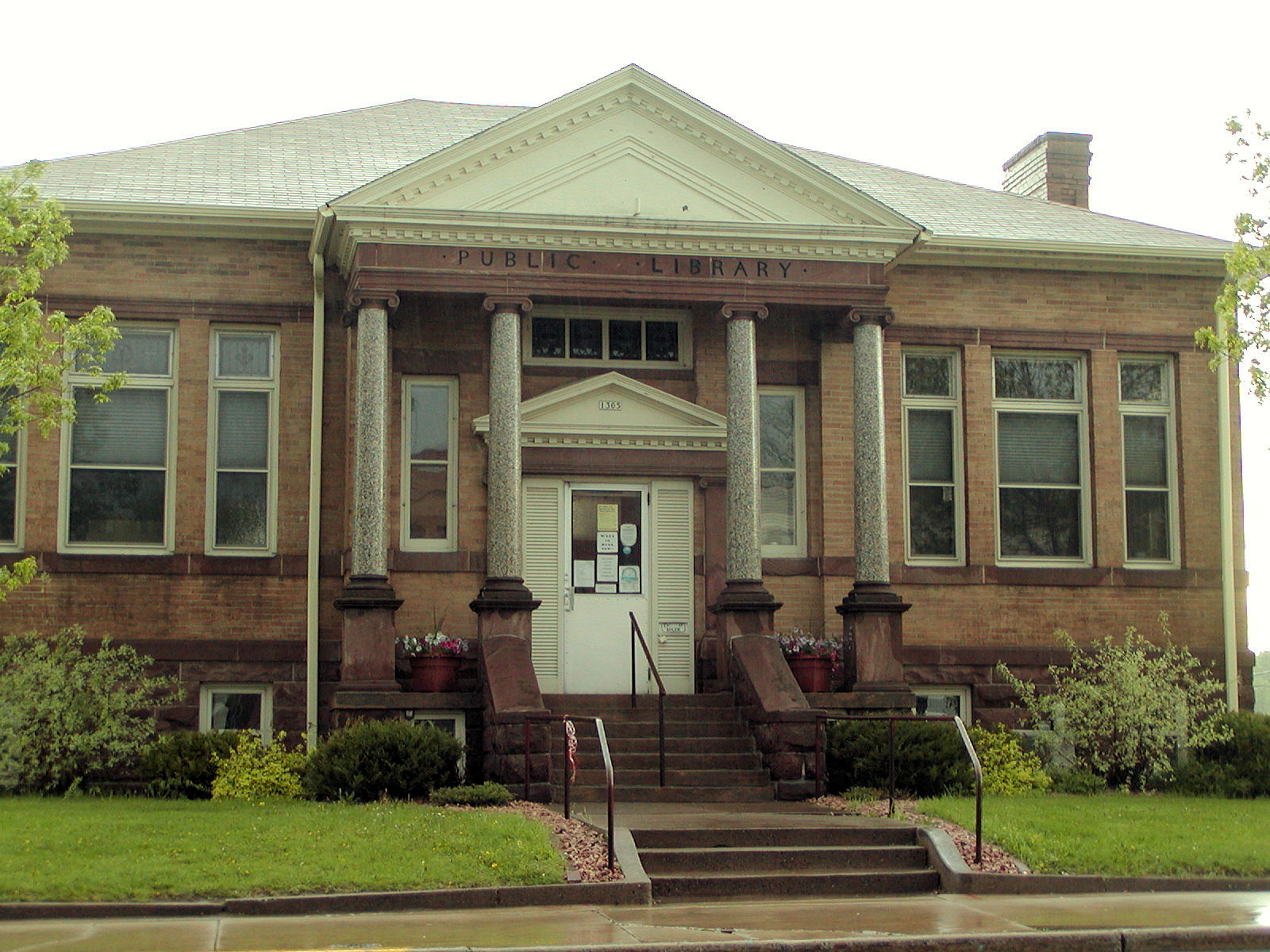
- Cumberland Public Library
- Location: 1305 Second Ave. Cumberland, Wisconsin
- Coordinates: 45.534°N 92.02184°W
- Architect: C. H. Patsche
- Architectural style: Classical Revival
- NRHP reference No.: 92000804
- Added to NRHP: June 25, 1992

Cumberland Public Library was added to the National Register of Historic Places in 1992 for its significance in architecture, education and social history. It is a Carnegie library. The library is still accessible today as a public library with materials and programs for all ages.
