= Cumberland, Rhode Island =

Coordinates: 41°58′00″N 71°25′58″W

- Town
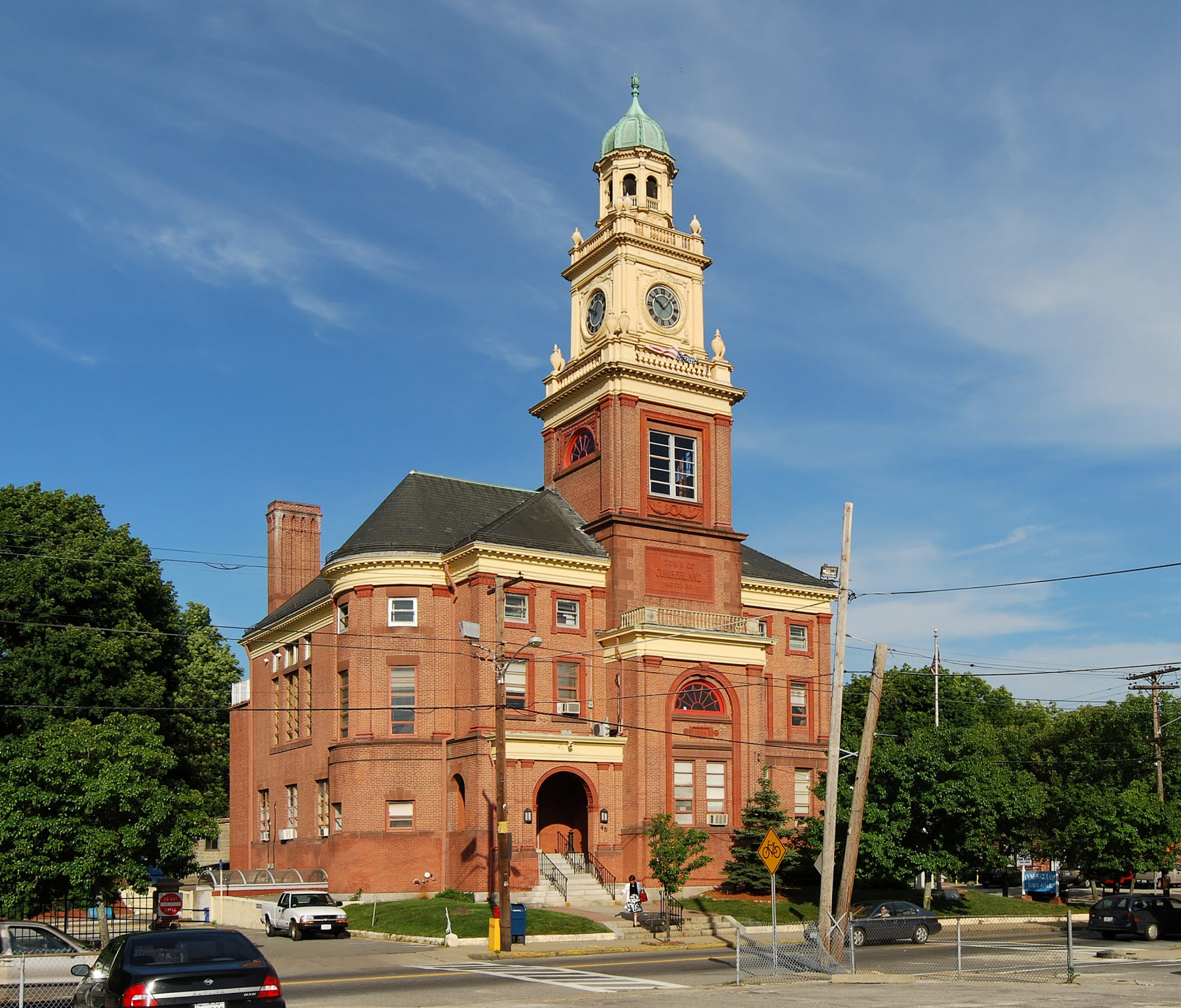
- Cumberland Town Hall

- Seal Logo
- Motto: Great History. Bright Future
- Location in Providence County and the state of Rhode Island.
- Country: United States
- State: Rhode Island
- County: Providence
- Settled: 1635
- Incorporated: 1746

Government
  - Mayor: Jeffrey Mutter (D)
  - Town Council: Michael L. Kinch (D) (At Large), President; Scott R. Schmitt (R) (Dist 4), President Pro Tem; Peter J. Bradley (D) (At Large); James K. Metivier (I) (Dist 1); Timothy C. Magill Jr. (D) (Dist 2); Lisa A. Beaulieu (D) (Dist 3); Robert G. Shaw, Jr. (D) (Dist 5)
  - School Committee: Karen Freedman (Dist 2), Chair; Mark Fiorillo (Dist 1), Vice Chair; Amy S. Vogel (At Large); Kerry Feather (At Large); Amy Rogalski (Dist 4); Denis Collins (Dist 5); Keri Smith (Dist 3), Clerk

Area
  - Total: 28.3 sq mi (73.2 km^{2})
  - Land: 26.4 sq mi (68.5 km^{2})
  - Water: 1.8 sq mi (4.7 km^{2})
- Elevation: 276 ft (84 m)

Population (2020)
  - Total: 36,405
  - Density: 1,380/sq mi (531/km^{2})
- ZIP code: 02864
- Area code: 401
- FIPS code: 44-20080
- GNIS feature ID: 1220068
- Website: www.cumberlandri.gov

Cumberland is the northeasternmost town in Providence County, Rhode Island, United States, first settled in 1635 and incorporated in 1746. The population was 36,405 at the 2020 census, making it the seventh-largest municipality and the largest town in the state.

== History ==
Cumberland was originally settled as part of Wrentham, Massachusetts, which was purchased from the local Indigenous Americans by the Plymouth Colony. It was later transferred to Rhode Island as part of a long-running boundary dispute. The town was named in honor of Prince William, Duke of Cumberland.

William Blackstone (also spelled William Blaxton in colonial times) was the first European to settle and live in Cumberland. (He was also the first European to have settled in Boston, but left when he and the newly arrived Puritans disagreed about religion.) He preached his brand of tolerant Christianity under an oak tree that became an inspiration to Christians worldwide. He lived on a farm in the Lonsdale area of Cumberland, where he cultivated the first variety of American apples, the Yellow Sweeting. The site of his home is now occupied by the Ann & Hope mill.

The popular tourist destination "Nine Men's Misery" is a tomb found on the grounds of a former Trappist monastery (Abbey of Our Lady of the Valley), part of which was destroyed in a fire in 1950. The Trappists sold the monastery and grounds to the town and part of the building was converted into the Edward J. Hayden Library, aka Cumberland Public Library in 1976. This combined three smaller libraries into one.

Cumberland was the site of iron works that made cannons and cannonballs for the French and Indian War and the American Revolution. Additionally, Cumberland (along with the neighboring towns of Central Falls, RI, Lincoln, RI, and Attleboro, Massachusetts) was the home of the Valley Falls Company, which is the original antecedent of Berkshire Hathaway, now one of the world's largest and most successful companies.

A machine shop in Cumberland made the first power looms for woolens in America. These were reportedly used at the Capron Mill in Uxbridge, around 1820, that burned in a fire in 2007.

Cumberland is home to the headquarters and original location of the Ann & Hope chain of discount stores which claims to be the first chain of discount department stores in America and was founded in 1955.

Cumberland is in the lower Blackstone Valley of Rhode Island and in the John H. Chafee, Blackstone River Valley National Heritage Corridor, New England's historic National Park area.

Aaron Fricke was denied a request to bring a same-sex date to a school prom at Cumberland High School 1980. In an early legal victory for LGBT rights, a federal court held that such a denial violated the student's free speech rights, in Fricke v. Lynch.

In the summers of 2011 and 2014, the Cumberland American Little League baseball team, led by coach David Belisle (both times), won the New England Regional Little League Baseball Championship and went on to play in the Little League World Series.

== Geography ==
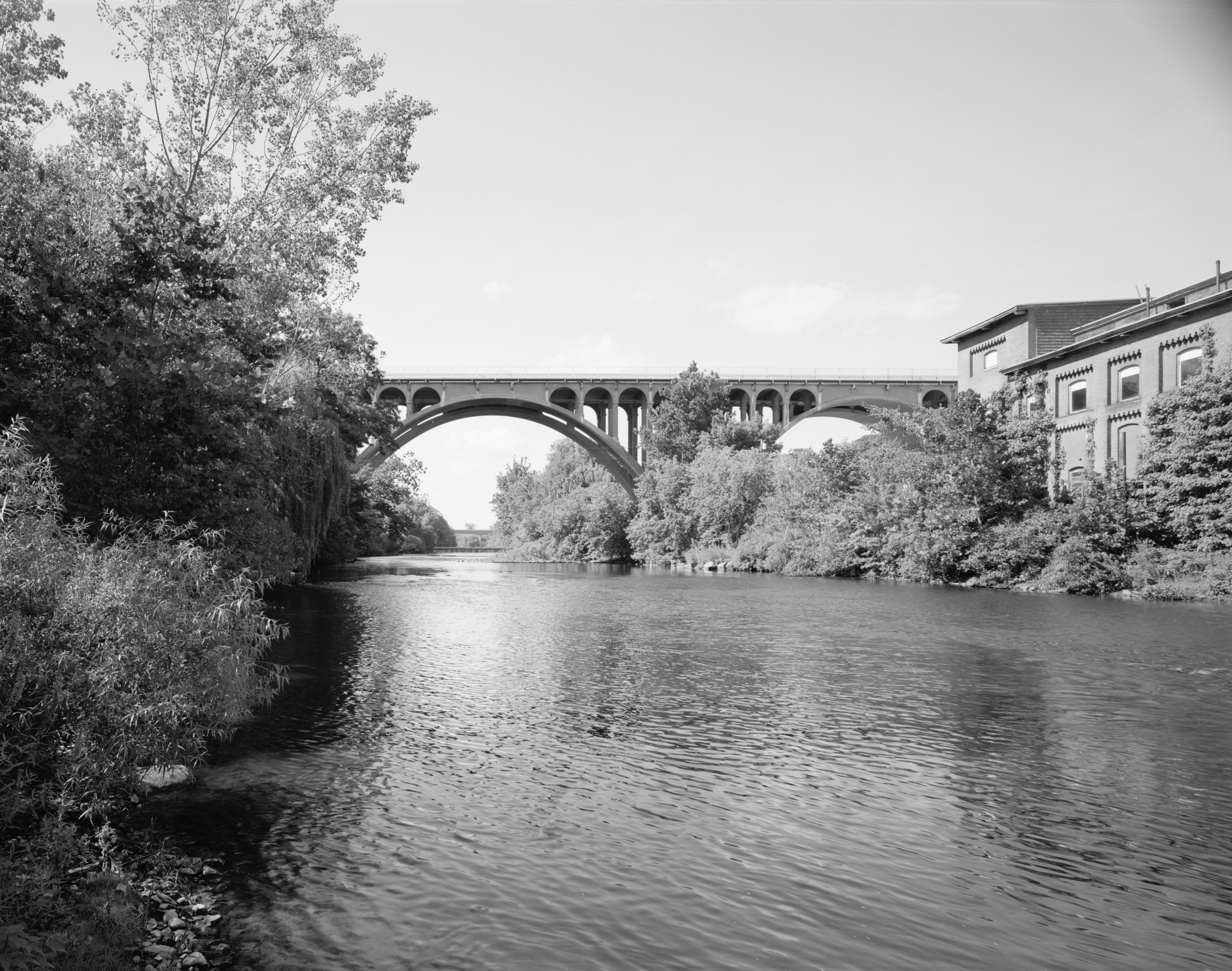
Ashton Viaduct, Ashton Village

According to the United States Census Bureau, the town has a total area of 28.3 square miles (73.2 km^{2}), of which 26.4 square miles (68.5 km^{2}) is land and 1.8 square miles (4.7 km^{2}), or 6.40%, is water. It contains the census-designated places of Cumberland Hill and Valley Falls.

Cumberland is the easternmost town along the state's northern border with Massachusetts, making it the state's de facto northeasternmost town. Cumberland borders the Rhode Island cities of Woonsocket to the northwest and Central Falls, to the south and the town of Lincoln to the west as well as the Massachusetts towns of Wrentham to the north, Plainville and North Attleborough to the east and city of Attleboro to the southeast.

The Rhode Island state rock Cumberlandite is a rare iron-rich mineral unique to the region. The only large deposit of the mineral in the world is found off Elder Ballou Meeting House Road in northern Cumberland. Though the ore was used to make cannons during the colonial era, the resulting casts were of poor quality and prone to cracking. A major geologic feature of the area is Diamond Hill, a massive outcropping of white quartz. The hill once was host to two small ski areas and is now a town park.

== Demographics ==
Historical population
Census	Pop.	Note	%±
1790	1,964		—
1800	2,056		4.7%
1810	2,210		7.5%
1820	2,653		20.0%
1830	3,675		38.5%
1840	5,225		42.2%
1850	6,661		27.5%
1860	8,339		25.2%
1870	3,882		−53.4%
1880	6,445		66.0%
1890	8,090		25.5%
1900	8,925		10.3%
1910	10,107		13.2%
1920	10,077		−0.3%
1930	10,304		2.3%
1940	10,625		3.1%
1950	12,842		20.9%
1960	18,792		46.3%
1970	26,605		41.6%
1980	27,069		1.7%
1990	29,038		7.3%
2000	31,840		9.6%
2010	33,506		5.2%
2020	36,405		8.7%
U.S. Decennial Census

As of the census of 2020, there were 36,405 people and 14,109 households in the town. The population density was 1,374 inhabitants per square mile (531/km^{2}). There were 15,017 housing units in the town. The racial makeup of the town was 83.84% White, 2.07% African American, 0.2% Native American, 4.05% Asian, 0.03% Pacific Islander, 3.57% from some other race, and 6.25% from two or more races. Hispanic or Latino of any race were 7.39% of the population.

There were 14,109 households, out of which 31.3% had children under the age of 18 living with them, 57.2% were headed by married couples living together, 22.7% had a female householder with no spouse present, and 14.2% had a male householder with no spouse present. 15.8% of all households were made up of individuals, and 9.3% were someone living alone who was 65 years of age or older. The average household size was 2.56 and the average family size was 3.04.

In the town, the population was spread out, with 22.1% under the age of 18, 5.4% from 18 to 24, 23.7% from 25 to 44, 31.2% from 45 to 64, and 17.6% who were 65 years of age or older. The median age was 44 years.

At the 2020 census, the median income for a household in the town was $118,642, and the median income for a family was $136,448. The per capita income for the town was $52,209. About 4.2% of the population were below the poverty line, including 4.1% of those under age 18 and 5.8% of those age 65 or over.

== Government ==
Cumberland town vote by party in presidential elections
Year	GOP	DEM	Others
2024	45.20% 8,771	52.05% 10,101	2.75% 533
2020	42.78% 8,418	55.23% 10,869	1.99% 391
2016	43.19% 7,444	50.21% 8,655	6.60% 1,138
2012	42.61% 7,106	55.71% 9,291	1.67% 279
2008	41.00% 6,941	57.33% 9,707	1.67% 283
2004	43.23% 6,874	55.04% 8,753	1.73% 275
2000	35.28% 5,129	58.61% 8,521	6.11% 888
1996	28.77% 3,950	57.70% 7,923	13.53% 1,858
1992	31.74% 4,869	41.75% 6,406	26.51% 4,067
1988	47.68% 6,281	52.03% 6,854	0.29% 38

In the Rhode Island Senate, Cumberland is split in its representation between the 19th District, represented by Democrat Ryan W. Pearson, and the 20th District, represented by Democrat Roger A. Picard. At the federal level, Cumberland is a part of Rhode Island's 1st congressional district, currently represented by Democrat Gabe Amo.

In presidential elections, Cumberland is reliably Democratic; no Republican presidential nominee has carried the town in over three decades.

== Schools ==
The school system, Cumberland School Department, is led by its seven-member School Committee that is elected to serve for four years and includes a chairperson, vice-chairperson, and clerk. The School Committee hires a Superintendent of Schools to administer policies and to manage and lead learning in the district. The Cumberland Superintendent of Schools (in chronological order) are Mr. Robert Condon, Dr. Robert McGinnis, Mr. Rodney McFarlin, Dr. Robert Patterson, Mr. Robert Wallace (1993–1996), Mr. Joseph Nasif (1996–2005), Dr. Donna Morelle (2005–2011), Dr. Phil Thornton (2011–2015), Mr. Robert Mitchell (2015–2021) and Dr. Phil Thornton (2021–present).

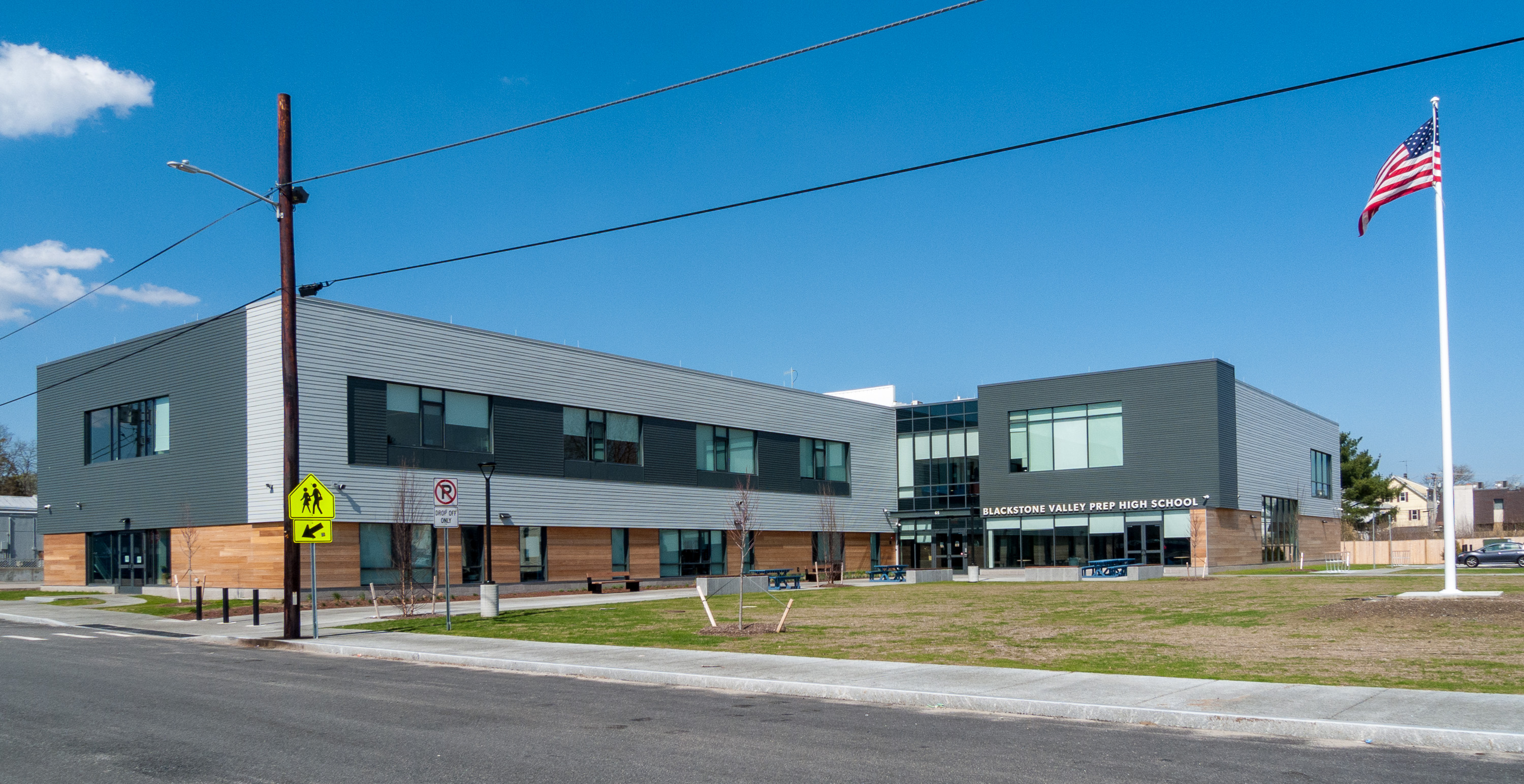
Blackstone Valley Prep High School

Cumberland is home to a public charter school, the first Rhode Island Mayoral Academy, Blackstone Valley Prep (originally Democracy Prep Blackstone Valley). The school opened in the fall of 2009 with Kindergarten.

The Blackstone Valley Prep High School, a $10 million mayoral charter school, opened in 2017 on the site of a former lumber center in Valley Falls.

The one non-public school in Cumberland, Mercymount Country Day School, is run by the Sisters of Mercy of the Americas, a Roman Catholic order which has its New England regional headquarters in Cumberland.

== Culture and traditions ==
Cumberland is home to the Arnold Mills Fourth of July Parade and 4 Mile Road Race, which is held each year to celebrate (Fourth of July). The first recorded Arnold Mills Parade was held on July 4, 1927. During the 2020 COVID-19 pandemic, the road race was held "virtually" for the first time.

Cumberland Farms, a large convenience store chain, takes its name from the original dairy farm business in Cumberland, Rhode Island.

A popular event, Cumberlandfest, is held each year on the second weekend of August at Diamond Hill Park on Diamond Hill Road. This event features a carnival, with rides and venues, as well as live entertainment and a small fireworks show. Proceeds go to the town's athletic programs.

The Blackstone River Theatre at 549 Broad Street hosts a wide variety of cultural events mostly in the form of intimate concerts encompassing the prevailing traditional cultures of the people who settled the Blackstone Valley. The Blackstone River Theatre sponsors the annual Summer Solstice Festival at Diamond Hill State Park in Cumberland.

Historic Metcalf-Franklin Farm on Abbott Run Valley Road was the last working dairy farm in Cumberland. Open historic fields, exposed farmers walls and a traditional "cow" pond are open for exploration. The 1810s barn and 1850s house are in the process of historical preservation.

== Notable people ==
- John Capron, Sr. (1797–1878), military officer, state legislator, and textile manufacturer; born in Cumberland
- Aaron Fricke, gay rights activist and author; successfully sued Cumberland High School for not allowing him to bring his same-sex partner, Michael Nobrega, to prom
- Public Universal Friend (1752–1819), genderless evangelist; born in Cumberland
- Johnny Goryl, Major League Baseball infielder 1957–1964 and minor and major league manager; born in Cumberland
- Richard Jenkins, actor (Six Feet Under, Cheaper by the Dozen); nominated in 2008 for Academy Award for Best Actor (The Visitor); lives in Cumberland
- Tyler Kolek, NBA point guard for the New York Knicks.
- Brian Lawton, left wing for six different National Hockey League teams; grew up in Cumberland
- David Macaulay, British-born author and illustrator; graduated from Cumberland High School
- Dan McKee, 76th Governor of Rhode Island (2021–) and former Lieutenant Governor (2015–2021); the town's former mayor from 2007 to 2015; member of the town council for multiple terms
- Cory Pesaturo, musician; three-time world champion, only person to ever win in acoustic, digital and jazz accordion; from Cumberland
- Stephen Peterson, rower on 1996 U.S. Olympic team and gold medalist at 1990 World Rowing Championships
- Jayden Struble, professional ice hockey defenseman for the Montreal Canadiens of the National Hockey League (NHL)
- Pete Wells, restaurant critic for The New York Times
- Tim White, referee for World Wrestling Entertainment (WWE); born in Cumberland
- Inez Whipple Wilder (1871–1929), zoologist who studied fingerprints and salamanders; born in Cumberland
- Annette Nazareth (born 1956), a former SEC Commissioner; raised in Cumberland and was valedictorian of the 1974 Cumberland High School class.

== National Registered Historic Places ==
- Arnold Mills Historic District
- Ashton Historic District
- Ballou–Weatherhead House
- Berkeley Mill Village
- Burlingame–Noon House
- John Cole Farm
- Furnace Carolina Site
- Luke Jillson House
- St. Joseph's Church Complex
- Lewis Tower House
- Tower–Flagg Barn Complex
- Whipple–Jenckes House
- Metcalf–Franklin Farm
