= Wheelockville, Massachusetts =

- Village
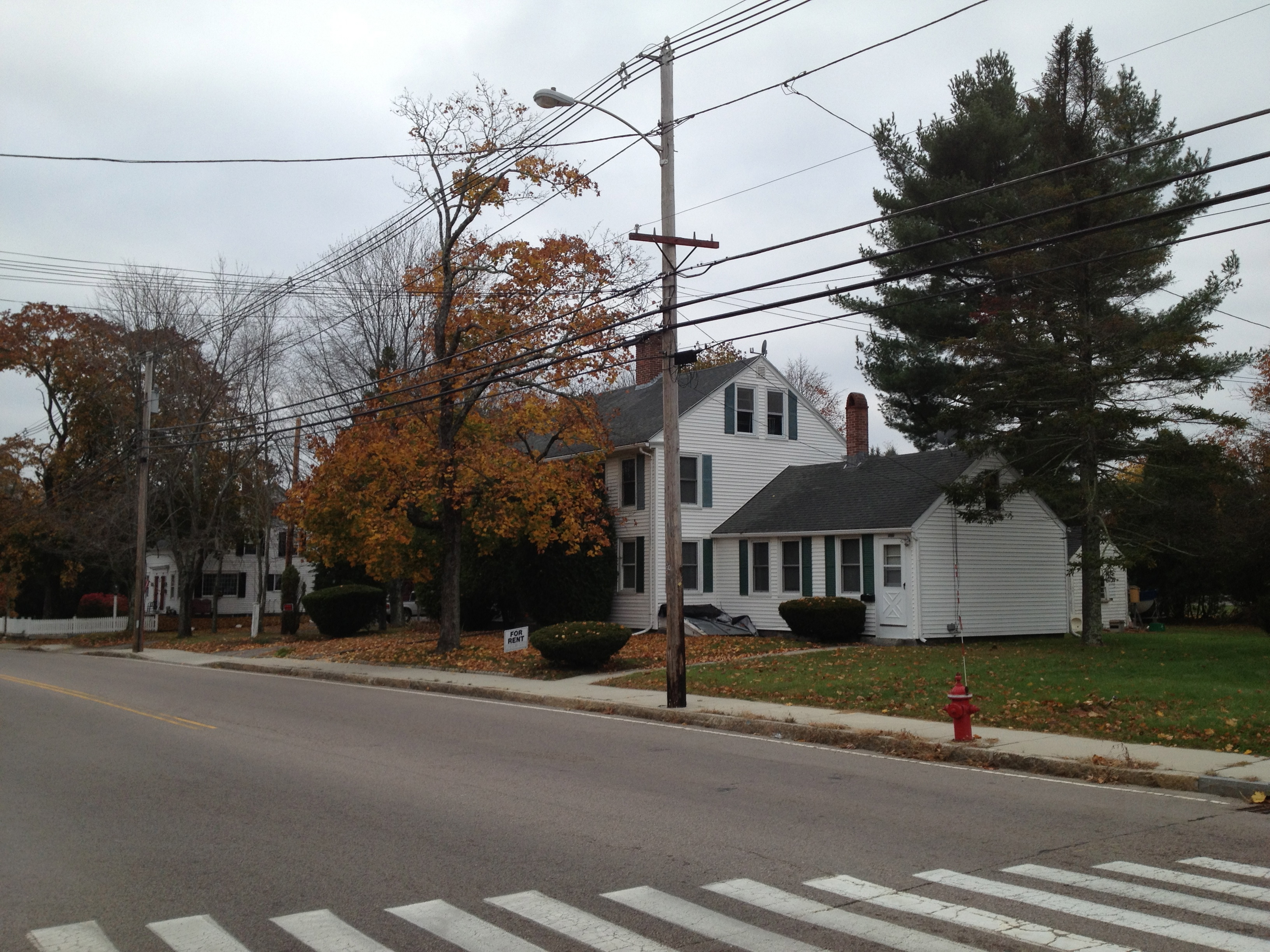
- Two wooden houses on Mendon Street typify the Wheelockville Historic District.

- Location within Massachusetts Location within the United States
- Coordinates: 42°04′50″N 71°36′53″W
- Country: United States
- State: Massachusetts
- County: Worcester
- Elevation: 246 ft (75 m)
- Time zone: UTC-5 (Eastern (EST))
  - Summer (DST): UTC-4 (EDT)
- ZIP code: 01569 (Uxbridge)
- GNIS feature ID: 611599

Wheelockville is a village in the town of Uxbridge, Massachusetts, United States. Part of the village centering on Mendon and Henry streets is listed on the National Register of Historic Places as the Wheelockville Historic District. Wheelockville appears on the Blackstone U.S. Geological Survey Map. The Village receives municipal services from Uxbridge, for fire, police, EMS, School district, public works, and other services. Worcester's Judicial District includes Uxbridge District Court. The geography of Wheelockville includes several other distinct mill villages, including: Hecla and Elmdale.

== Historic significance of village and family ==
The earliest textile mills of Uxbridge were centered at the village of Wheelockville including the Daniel Day mill, (now the "Elmdale" section), the Jerry Wheelock Mill, and the Luke Taft Mill. John Capron's mill was nearby (only a few blocks West) on the Mumford River at Uxbridge. Daniel Day, who married Sylvia Wheelock, and who was Jerry Wheelock's father in law, established the first woolen mill in the Blackstone valley at Uxbridge, in 1809, one of the oldest woolen mills in the US, at "Elmdale" (S. Wheelockville). Jerry Wheelock, who joined his father in law in the business, was then the earliest known Wheelock to become a textile manufacturer. It is understood that the village's name of Wheelockville is derived from this branch of the Wheelock family. The earliest Wheelock settler of Uxbridge was Lt. Simeon Wheelock, an Uxbridge blacksmith who fought at Lexington, and died in Shays' Rebellion. Shays' Rebellion had opening salvos in the town of Uxbridge. The Blackstone Valley is a corridor of national significance to America's earliest industrial revolution. Wheelockville is the geographic center of this valley. Two of the rivers that powered these early mills flowed through Wheelockville, including the Blackstone River, and the West River (Massachusetts). The family owned business begun by Jerry Wheelock and his father in law continues today, under the name of Berrocco, Inc.

== Hecla and Elmdale Section ==
The Hecla Mill was located off Hecla Street, at the site of today's Uxbridge Department of Public Works, and D'Alfonso Park. At one time the Hecla mill also went by the name of American Woolen Company. "Hecla" was also the location of Hilena Lowell's shoe factory. The Waucantuck Mill Complex was derived from the original Luke Taft Mill. Waucantuck Mill was razed in 2010 because of toxic wastes, and only a storage shed remains of the original Luke Taft enterprise. Daniel Day's mill became Scott's Woolen Mill in later years. Today the former Scott's Mill at "Elmdale", houses some remnant businesses related to now dormant mills that once thrived here including Bernat Yarn company. (once the nation's second leading yarn plant)

== Wheelockville mills ==
The early textile mills in Wheelockville in historic order were the Daniel Day (manufacturer) mill, the first local woolen carding Mill at Elmdale, 1809, The Luke Taft Mill, 1825, and the later Waucantuck Mill near the site of the Luke Taft Mill. Each of these early mills were on the West River (Massachusetts), and the two earliest mills were water powered. In 1852, the Stanley Woolen mill was built by Moses Taft nearby on the Blackstone River.

== Industrial era photos ==
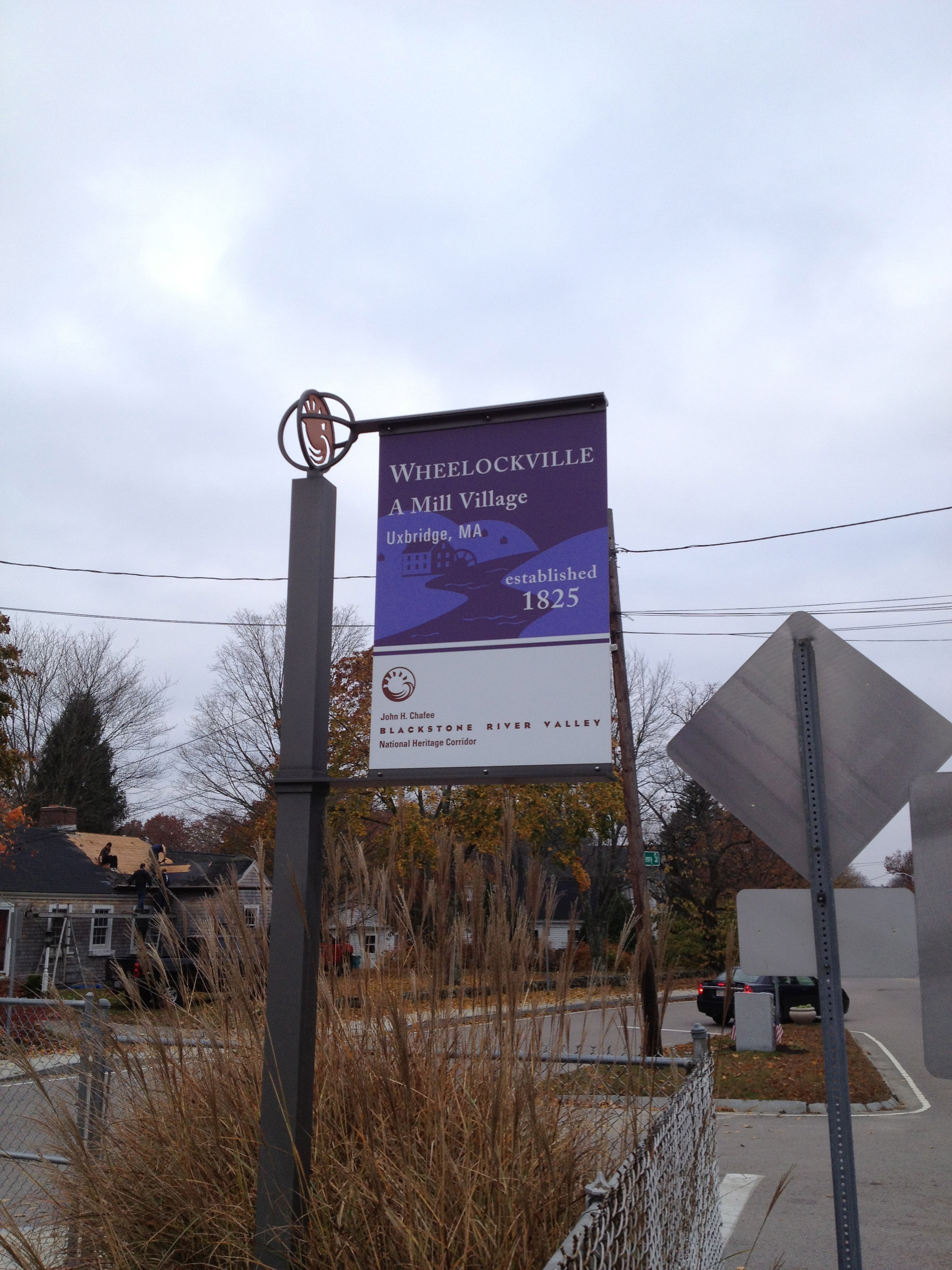
Historic Marker notes 1825 beginning of Wheelockville as a village

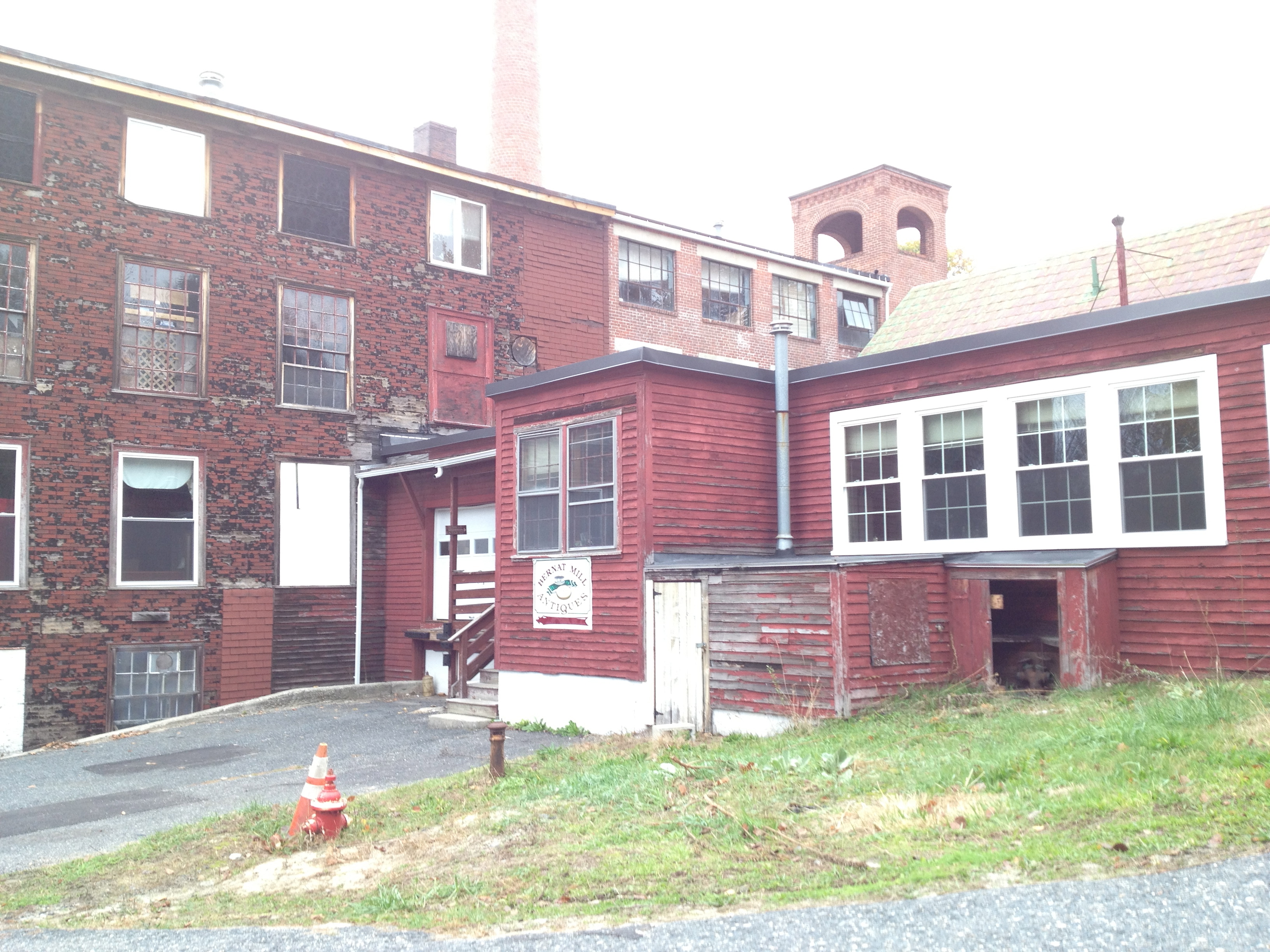
"Elmdale", site of 1809 Daniel Day Mill. Daniel Day (Manufacturer) started the first woolen mill in the Blackstone Valley later also known as "Scott's Mill, the current factory recently housed Berrocoo Inc. a 200 year family enterprise, now international woolens.

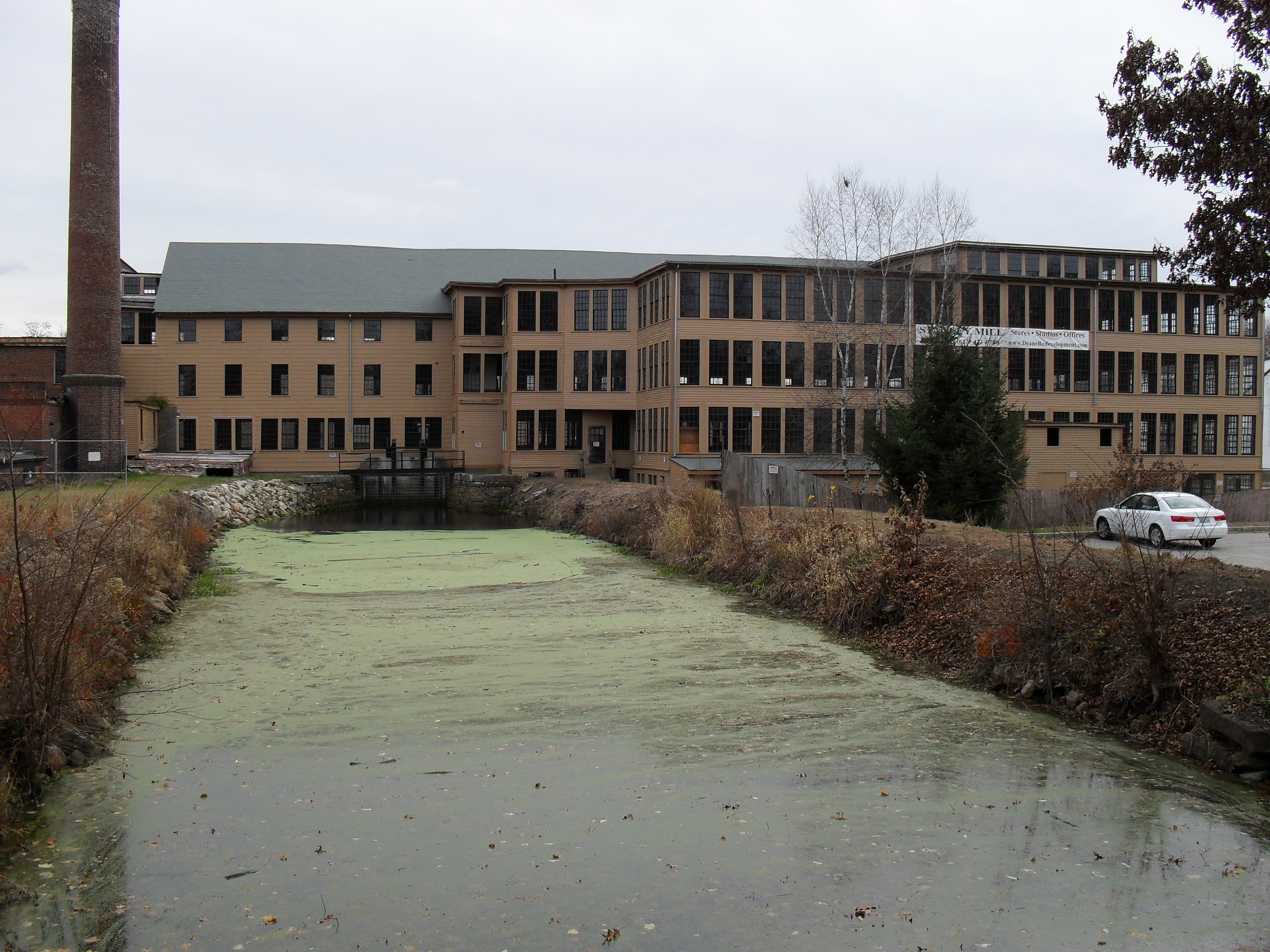
Stanely Woolen Mill, Nov. 11, 2009, founded by Moses Taft, in 1852 at Uxbridge, MA, with view of the Blackstone Canal; vertical integration of woolens to clothing was pioneered here

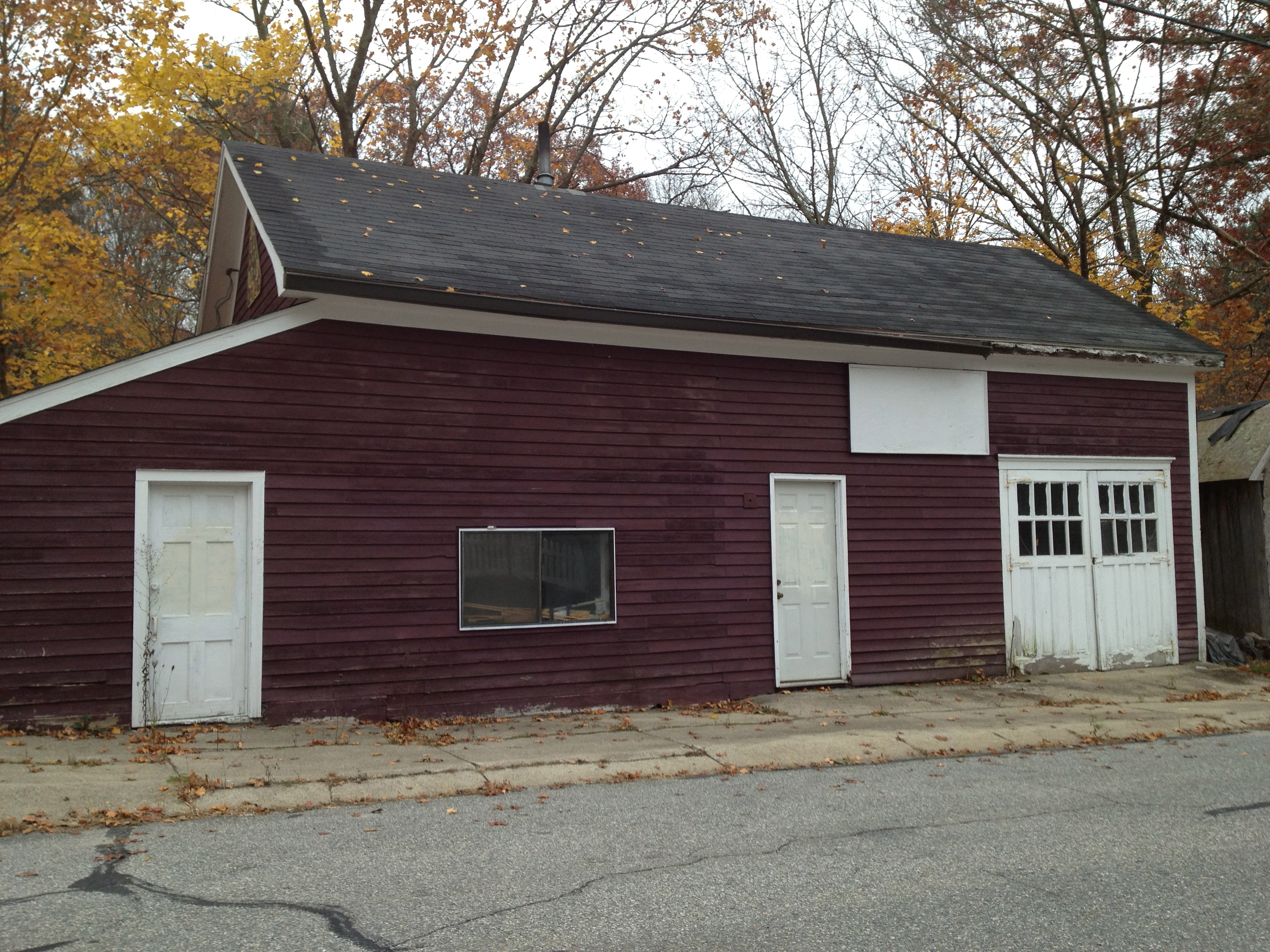
Waucantuck Mill Complex, A storage building is all that remains of the original site of the 1825 Luke Taft Mill where wash and wear fabrics were pioneered in the USA

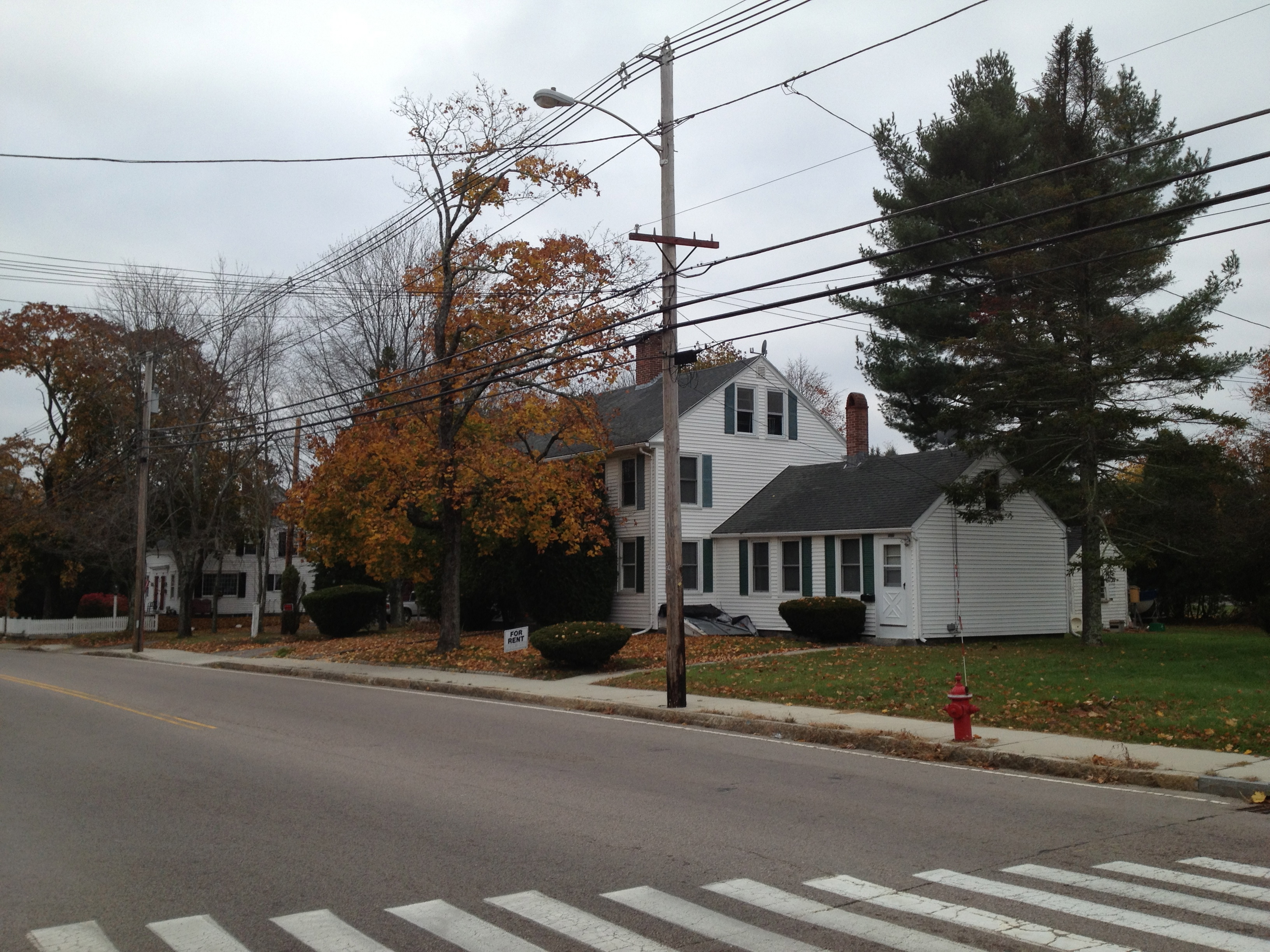
The village of Wheelockville is known for older wooden homes such as these two houses on Mendon Street

Three mills built here are important to the early history of the Blackstone Valley: The Daniel Day Mill, 1809, the Luke Taft Mill, 1825, and the Moses Taft Mill, 1852. These three mills had connections to the famous American Taft family. In later years the Wheelock family had ownership of the Moses Taft Mill and the village took the name of Wheelockville. However that Mill is listed in the National Register as the Calumet Mill, or Central Woolen Mills District. The Waucantuck Mill Complex, was near the site of one of the original Luke Taft Mills, and was razed in 2010 because of toxic wastes. It was listed separately in the National Historic Register. The original mills built here by Daniel Day, and Luke Taft, were powered by water from the local rivers. This system of water powered mills, driven by dams, with spillways, and surrounded by mill villages, was first developed at nearby Slatersville, Rhode Island, by John and Samuel Slater, and became known as "The Rhode Island System".

The Moses Taft Mill also held the name of the Calumet mill. The Wheelock family is an influential early American family with roots in this historic community. Wheelockville and Uxbridge are part of the Blackstone River Valley National Heritage Corridor of the National Park Service of the U.S. The Blackstone Valley is the earliest industrialized region in the United States. The Moses Taft mill ran 24/7 during the American Civil War making Union Blue Uniforms. The same mill made Khaki Uniforms and cloth for the armies of France and Italy during the World War I. This village was used for scenes in two movies, The Great Gatsby (1974 film), and Oliver's Story in the 1970s.

== Government ==
See Uxbridge for local Government and Town website uxbridge-ma.gov

== See also ==
- Stanley Woolen Mill
- Blackstone River and Canal Heritage State Park
- List of mill towns in Massachusetts
