= Central Woolen Mills District =

Historic district in Massachusetts, United States

- U.S. National Register of Historic Places
- U.S. Historic district
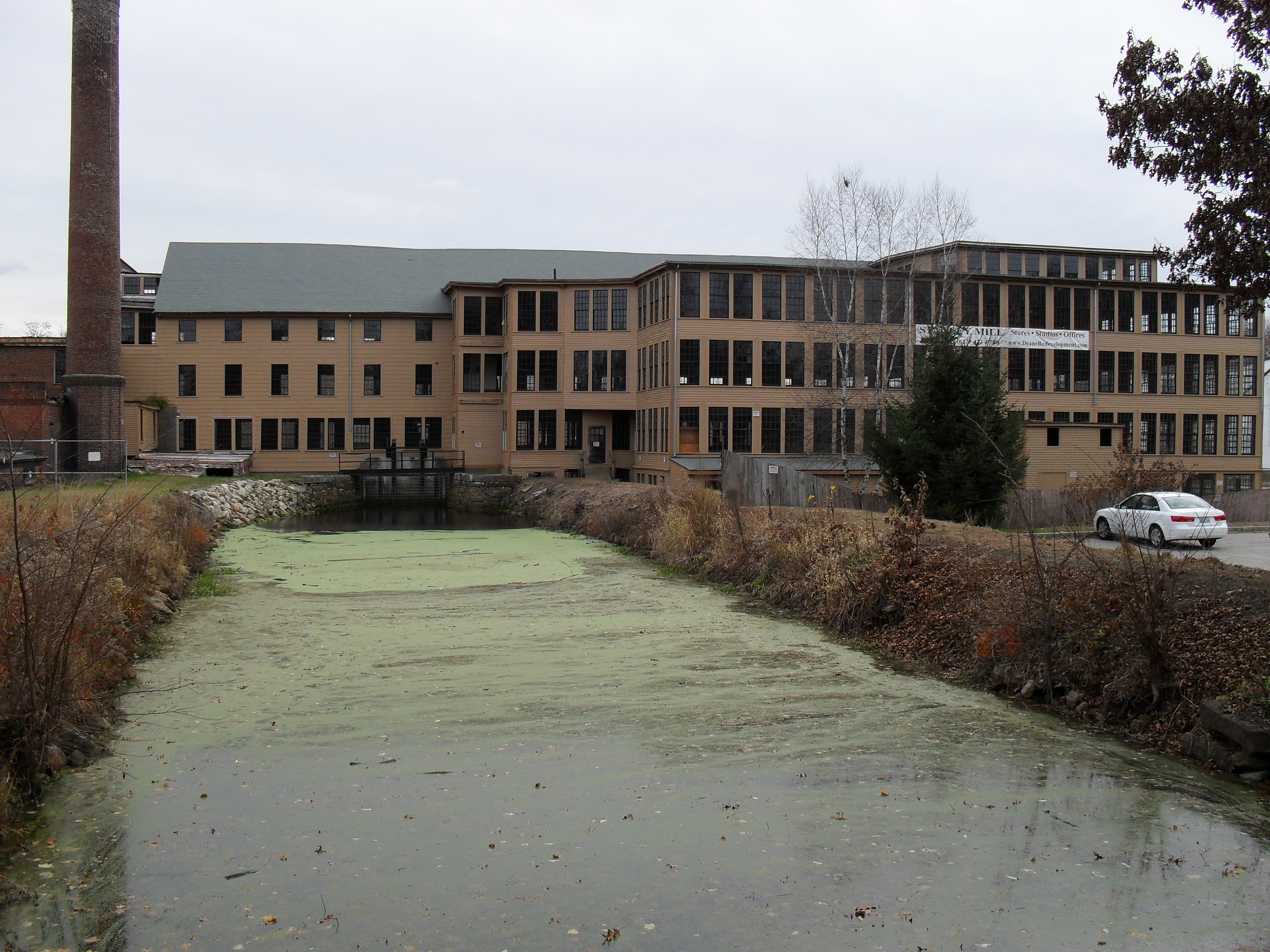

- Location within Massachusetts Location within the United States
- Location: Uxbridge, Massachusetts
- Built: 1852
- MPS: Uxbridge MRA
- NRHP reference No.: 84002905
- Added to NRHP: January 20, 1984

The Central Woolen Mills District is a historic district in Uxbridge, Massachusetts, USA. The centerpiece of this historic district is the Stanley Woolen Mill, also known as the Central Woolen Mill, built by Moses Taft in 1852, and earlier by his father, Luke Taft, in 1833, on the banks of the Blackstone Canal. The district is the southern entrance to the Blackstone River and Canal Heritage State Park. This parkland is the geographic center of the Blackstone River Valley National Heritage Corridor, an historic corridor of national significance as an example of the earliest industrial activity of the United States.

On October 7, 1983, the district was added to the National Register of Historic Places.

== See also ==
- National Register of Historic Places listings in Uxbridge, Massachusetts
