= Stanley Woolen Mill =

Stanley Woolen Will
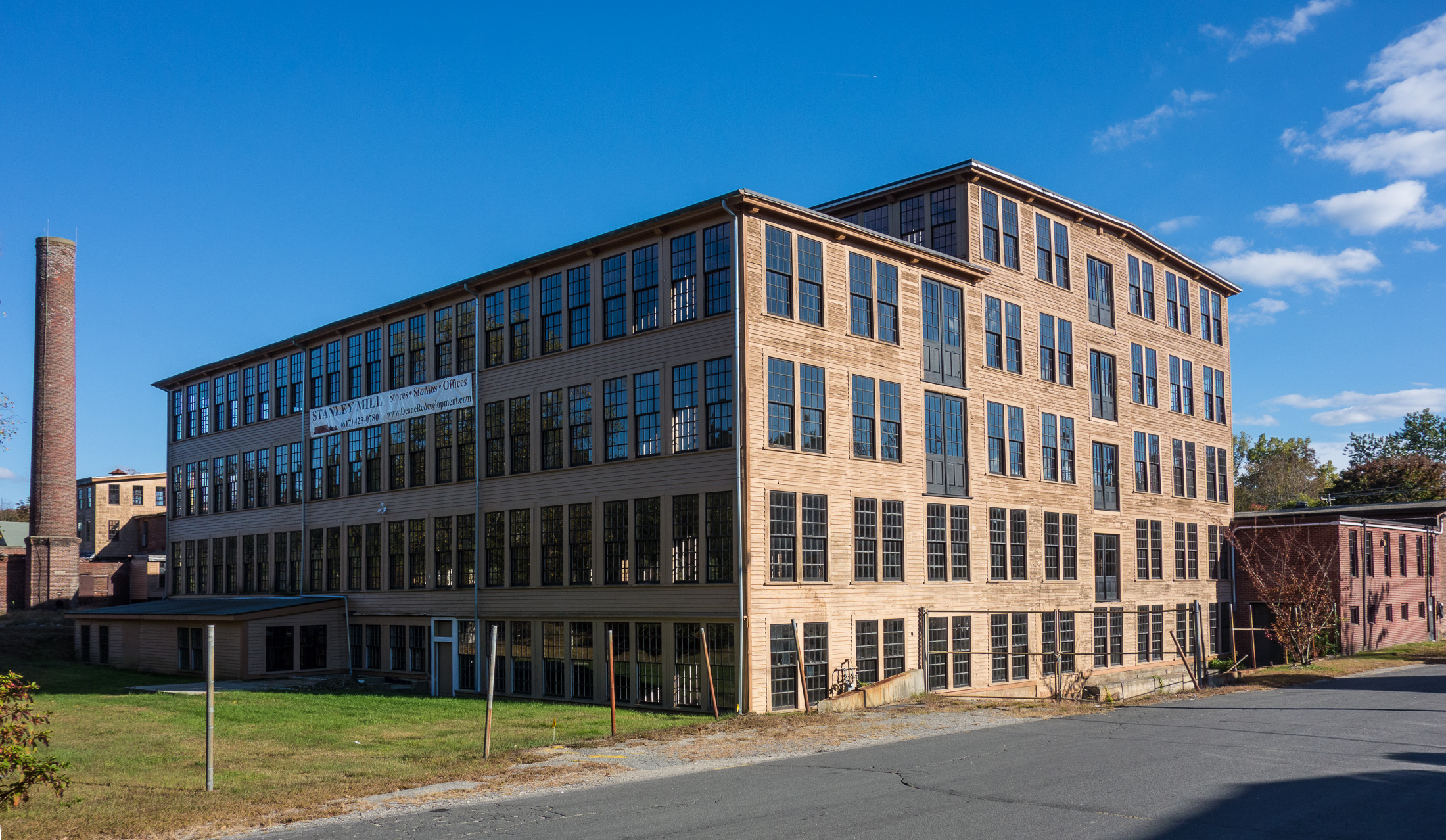
- Stanley Woolen Mill in 2013

- Location within Massachusetts

General information
- Architectural style: Industrial
- Location: Uxbridge, Massachusetts, United States
- Coordinates: 42°4′48″N 71°37′15″W
- Elevation: 70 m (230 ft)
- Construction started: 1852
- Owner: Stanley Woolen Company

Stanley Woolen Mill is the common historic name applied to a defunct company based in southeastern Massachusetts and to the company's buildings which stand at the southern entrance to the Blackstone River and Canal Heritage State Park. The mill is an important footnote in the history of the textile industry in America. Stanley Woolen Mill is the centerpiece of the Central Woolen Mills District which is part of the National Historic Register.

== Overview ==
Stanley Woolen Mill is located in the center of the Blackstone River Valley National Heritage Corridor at Uxbridge, a heritage corridor of national significance for America's earliest industrialization. The main factory building represents the last of a line of wooden textile mills built for mechanized manufacturing in Massachusetts and in the US. This mill helped to pioneer satinet, cashmeres, and utilized power looms, (first developed for woolens in the U.S. by John Capron from Uxbridge). Stanley Woolen had a long history of manufacturing military uniforms from the time of the American Civil War through the World Wars and including for the allied armies of Europe in World War I. "Beginning as Stanley Woolen Mills, the firm survived two depressions, weathering the changing times and the changing demands in the world of textiles. Over the years, the Stanley Woolen Company mills sold to such manufacturers as Evan Picone, Perry Ellis, Brooks Brothers and Hager". It is reported that Stanley Woolen Mill was the first US mill to completely manufacture woolen garments, mainly men's wear for the domestic market. Another tradition of this mill's long history was the blending of wool and cottons as fabrics in the manufacture of clothing.

== The original founding families ==
The American Taft family first settled in what later became Uxbridge in the 17th century. A descendant, Luke Taft became one of the earliest industrial pioneers here.) Luke Taft was the son in law of Daniel Day, and married his daughter Nancy. In 1809, Daniel Day had started the first woolen mill in Uxbridge and the Blackstone River Valley, one of the first woolen mills in the US (third), a little bit downstream. The Wheelocks, (descended from the Rev. Ralph Wheelock, the pioneer of American public education), also settled in Uxbridge, in the 18th century. Lt. Simeon Wheelock, a Revolutionary War soldier, fought and died in Shays' Rebellion. His son Jerry, became one of the earliest textile pioneers in Uxbridge, and worked with Luke Taft. Luke and Nancy (Day) Taft had a son, Moses, who was born in January 1812. Jerry Wheelock's daughter, Sylvia A Wheelock, then married Moses Taft in 1834. Luke Taft established a mill at the site in 1833, and Moses Taft, (Luke's son and Daniel Day's grandson) established what later became the larger Stanley Mill in 1852. Uxbridge was an early industrial center that played key roles in the early textile industry in America, pioneering satinets, cashmeres, blended fabrics, and power looms for woolens. Stanley Woolen Mill later would become a legacy of both the Taft and Wheelock families, continuing woolen and textile innovations of Uxbridge, begun by Jerry, Luke and their contemporaries. Stanley Woolen Mill became the first mill to offer complete vertical integration from raw materials to clothing. Stanley Woolen Mill, was a continuously operating family business, from 1833 at the present site, and from 1809, with its connections to Daniel Day.

== Historic significance ==
Following the demise of the Blackstone Canal in 1847, Moses Taft, a financier and industrialist, built his Central Woolen Mill on the banks of the former Canal, in 1852. His father, Luke Taft, had built an earlier mill here in 1833. The Central Woolen (Moses Taft) mill ran round the clock during the American Civil War. Union Blue Uniforms were made at Central Woolen. By the mid-1850s the mills of Uxbridge, were producing 2.5 million yards (2 million square meters) of cloth yearly. Some of the earliest improvements of textiles, and their industrial processes occurred in the Uxbridge Mills including Central Woolen also known as Calumet Mill.

In later years, from 1903, the mill became known as Wheelock Mill or simply Stanley Woolen. In the later 20th century the mill buildings were designated as Contributing Structures to the Blackstone Canal National Historic District. While most of the mill's land was sold to the Commonwealth of Massachusetts for the state park, the buildings themselves continued in private hands because manufacturing continued. Tours of the working factory were intended to be a component of the Park's 'Farm to Factory' story.

Integrated operation from carding through spinning, dying and weaving ended soon after the Park opened, but small specialty weaving operations continued in a portion of the mill until 1998 when the deterioration of the buildings made them unusable. (See also links for the Blackstone River Valley National Heritage Corridor).

While still in full operation the factory was used in the production of several movies including Oliver's Story 1978, and The Great Gatsby 1974. An antique store and antique refinishing shop maintained occupancy in a portion of the building. From 2005 to 2010 the main building and the attached brick and light frame structures have been under restoration funded by private investors to prepare them for retail and office re-use. The new uses were intended to complement regional and local efforts to develop tourism and new businesses.

With restoration of 419 surviving original 536 twelve-over-twelve windows and of 40 of 60 pairs of massive doors it is among the best preserved wooden structures of the old textile manufacturing era in Massachusetts. The redevelopment has helped its preservation and had no negative environmental impacts on neighboring Federal or state parklands or the canal.

The Wheelock Family mill became known as one of the longest-running family owned textile businesses in the US, lasting over a century. Today its Berroco Inc. yarn distribution operation is headquartered nearby and traces its roots to Jerry Wheelock and the Stanley Woolen Mill.

The additional references cited below, as other references, add to the history of this site, and offer a pictorial overview. "The Stanley Mill Story" published recently by Deane Redevelopment, is cited first among "other references", and describes the possibility raised by economic historian Jill Dupree that the history of the Blackstone Canal was one of rival industrialists using laws that encouraged transportation projects such as the Blackstone Canal to wrest "water rights" from previous owners. Moses Taft certainly took advantage of the collapse of the bankrupt Blackstone canal properties to acquire the Canal and use it as the mill race to power his mill on this site.

== Citations from the Blackstone Daily ==
Uxbridge Walking Tour 146 Mendon is the site of the Stanley Woolen Mill, originally known as the Central Woolen Mill in Calumet Village. It is mostly vacant, yet a portion of the huge wooden buildings house a spacious antique store and is the subject of future visioning sessions by State, federal and local partnerships. In 1852, Moses Taft built the mill and leased it to Israel Southwick and Richard Sayles. During the Civil Way, 24-hour production of indigo blue uniform cloth was ongoing before the mill was sold to Robert and Jacob Taft in 1865. Soon after, they built a dam at Rice City Pond which considerably increased the water power. In 1866, an 80 horsepower (60 kW) steam engine was installed and production continued to rise dramatically as the mill started producing fancy cashmeres as the name changed to the Calumet Woolen Company. Arthur and Stanley Wheelock bought the mill after 1905 and during WWI, a half million yards of khaki for the US government was produced as well as cloth for the French and Italian governments. This was the longest-running family-owned woolen mill in the US until it closed in 1988.

== Continuation of Berroco Handknitting Yarns ==
Today Stanley Mill begun by the Uxbridge Wheelocks and Tafts in the 19th century, continues under the name of Berroco Inc, at nearby North Smithfield, RI. Stanley-Berroco began as a subsidiary of Stanley Woolen Mill in 1968. The Berroco Corporate site was recently at the same location as the former Scott Mill, and the original site of the Daniel Day mill of 1809, just a little bit downstream on the Blackstone River, from the Stanley Woolen Mill. Two centuries later in 2010, America's earliest textile history continues today in what is the center of the Blackstone River Valley National Heritage Corridor. Warren Wheelock, a descendant of Jerry Wheelock, leads this company today.

Stanley Woolen Mill Gallery

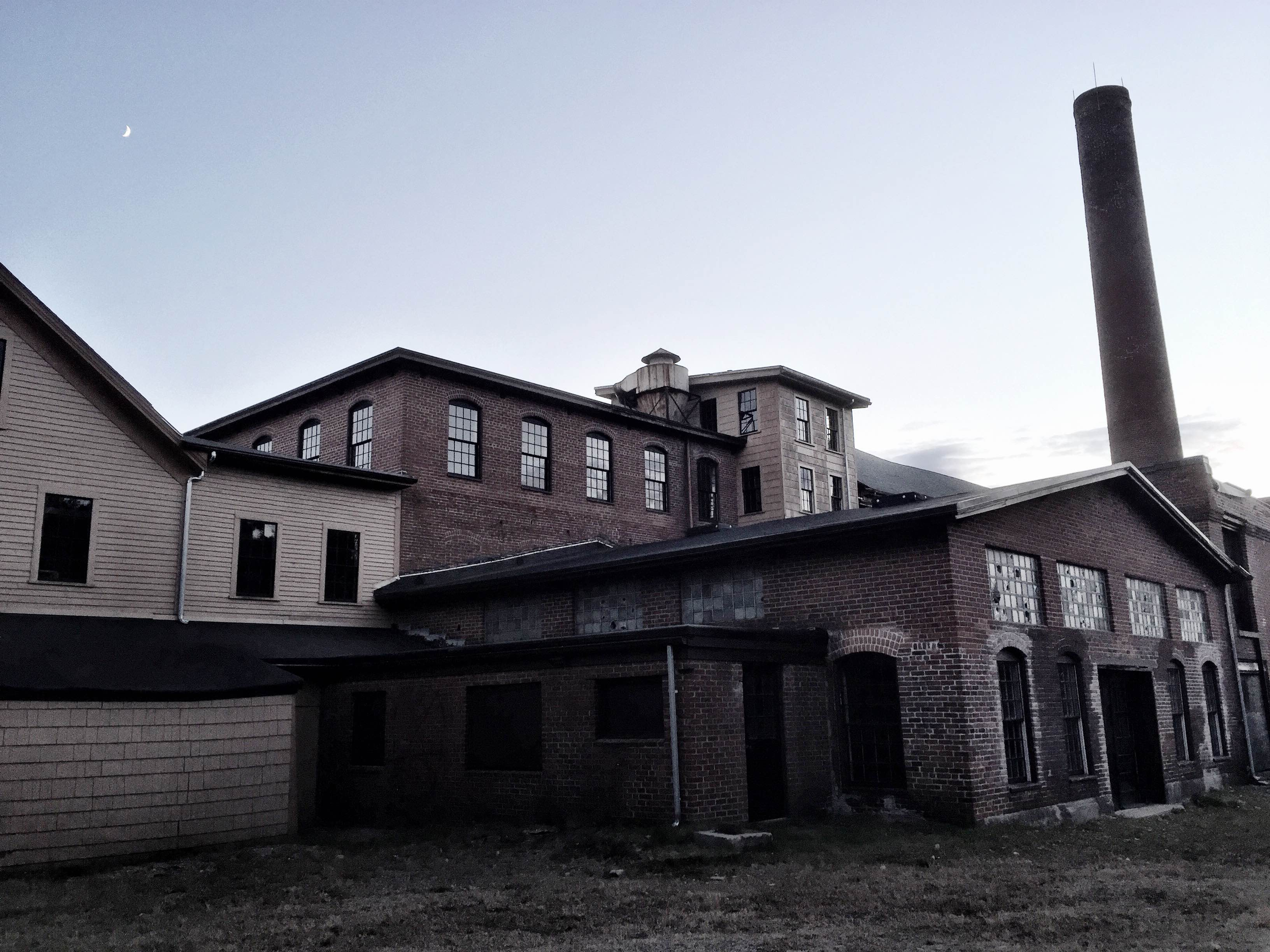
Stanley Woolen Mill, October 2015

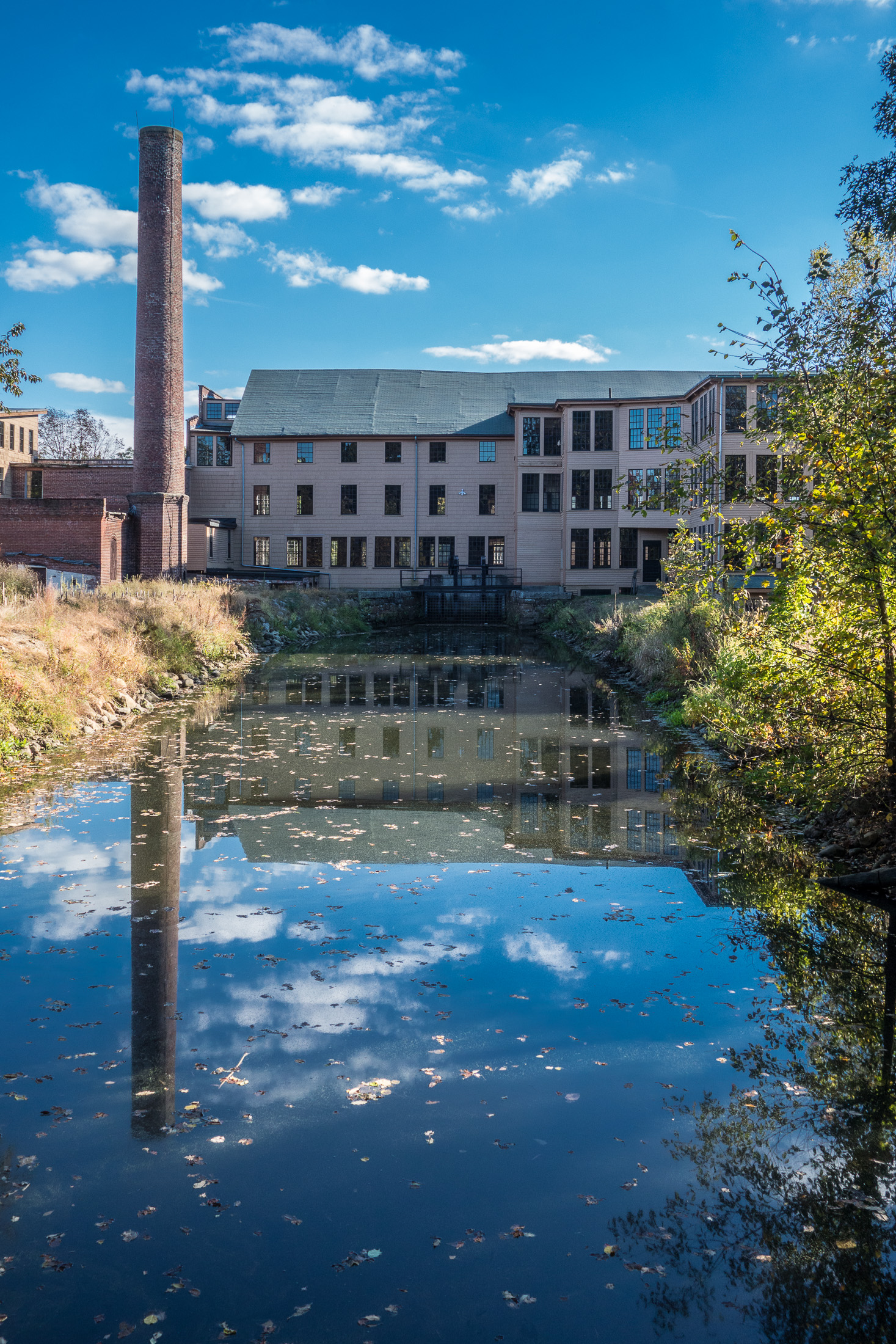
Stanley Woolen Mill reflected in Blackstone Canal

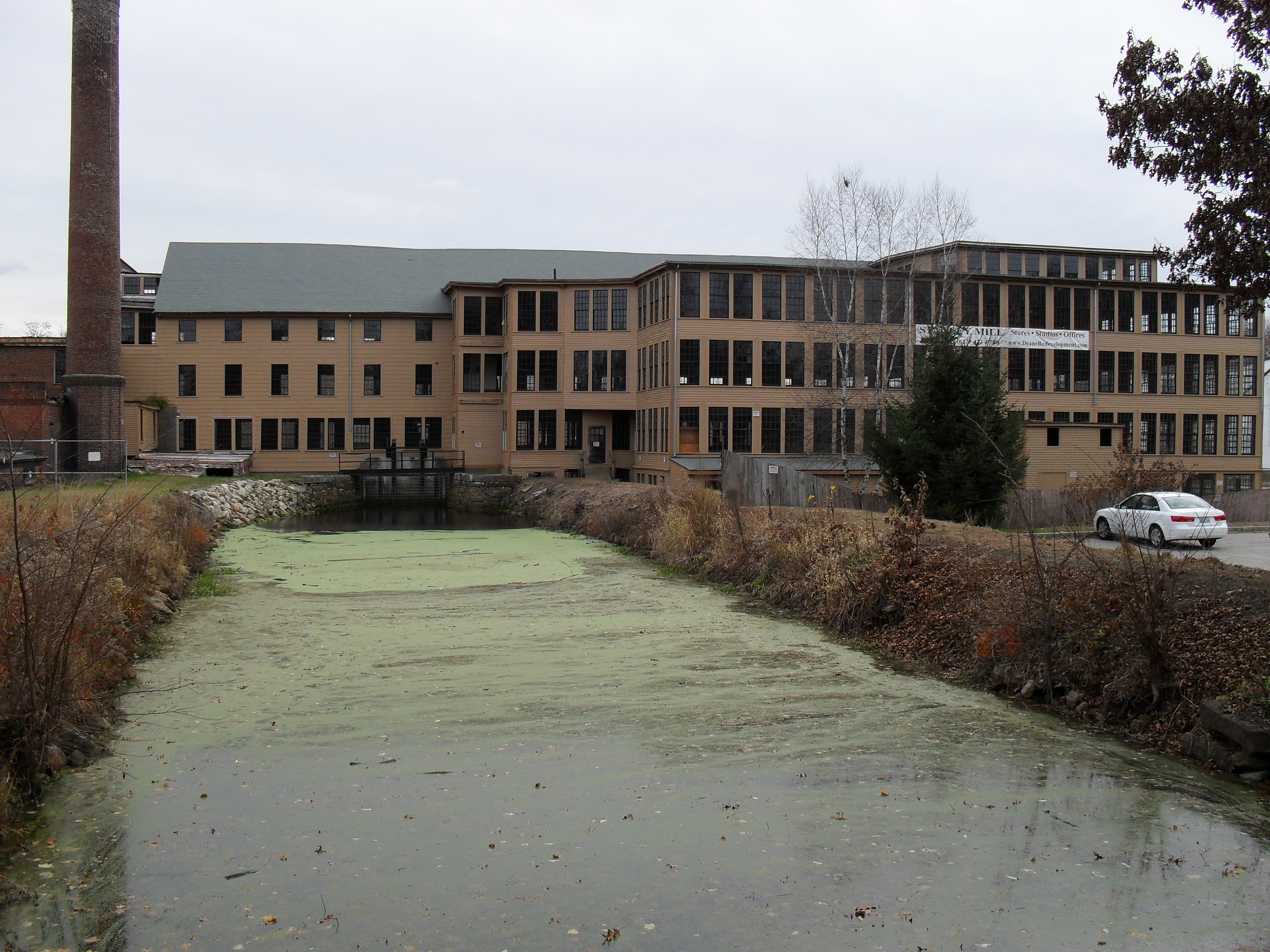
Stanley Woolen Mill, Nov. 11, 2009, Uxbridge, Massachusetts, with view of the Blackstone Canal

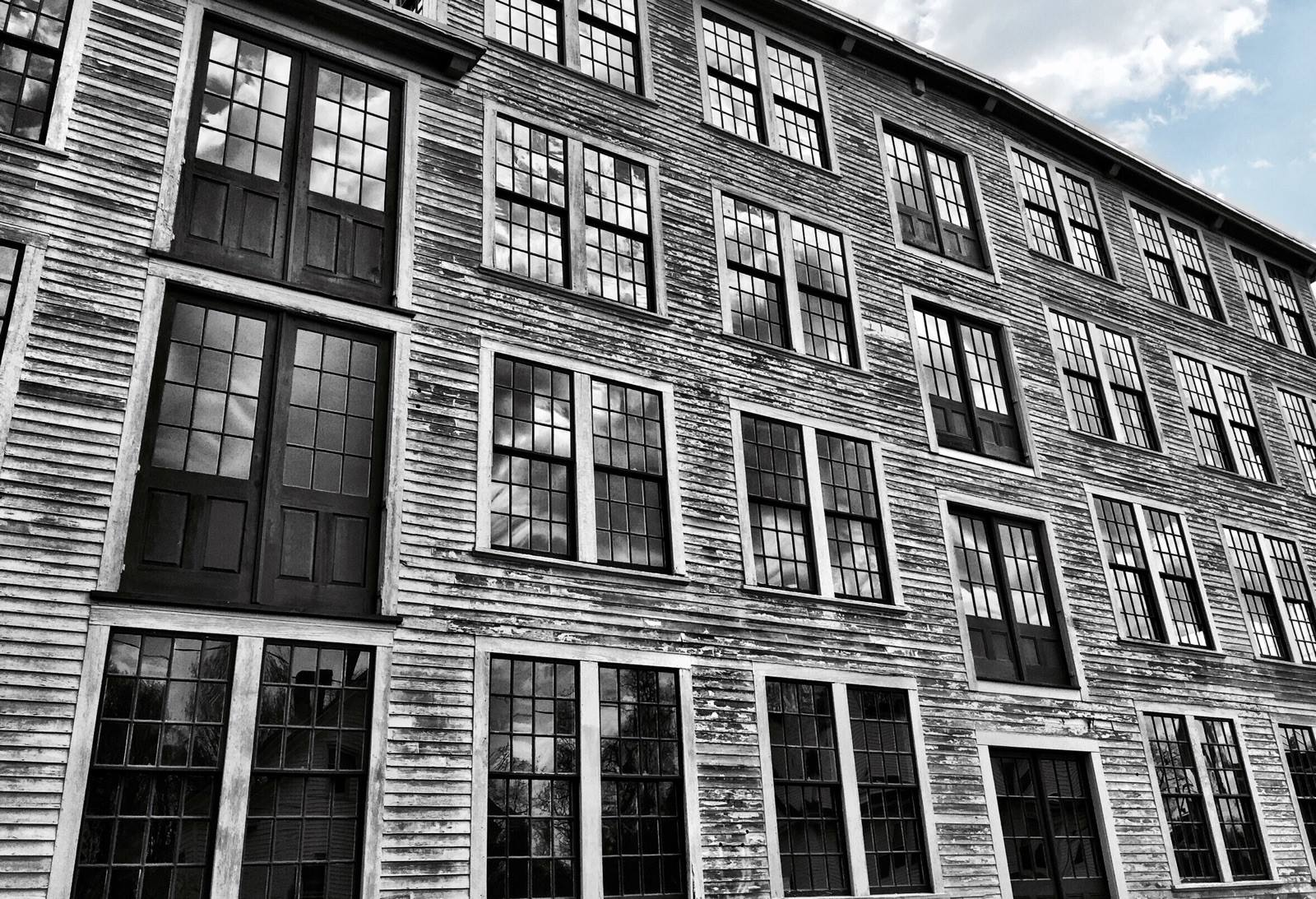
Stanley Woolen Mill, June 2015

== See also ==
- Wheelockville
- Central Woolen Mills District
- Taft Family
- Blackstone River and Canal Heritage State Park
- Blackstone River Valley National Heritage Corridor
