= Moshassuck Square =

- U.S. National Register of Historic Places
- U.S. Historic district
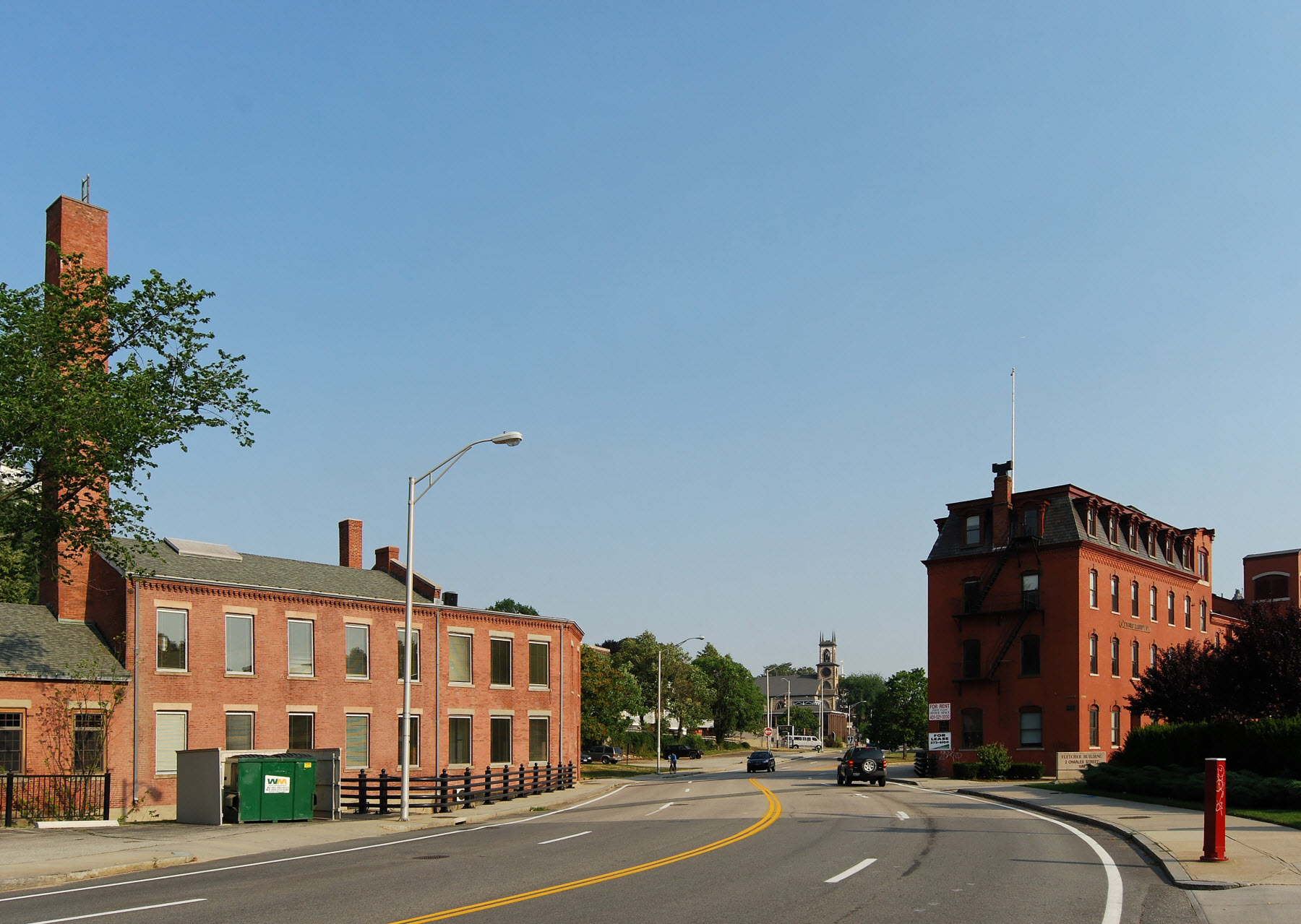
- The Stillman White and Fletcher Company buildings on Mill Street

- Location within Rhode Island Location within the United States
- Location: Providence, Rhode Island
- Coordinates: 41.8351°N 71.41076°W
- Architect: Morse, Alpheus
- Architectural style: Italianate
- NRHP reference No.: 70000001
- Added to NRHP: September 8, 1970

Moshassuck Square (MOE-shash-uck) is an industrial historic district in Providence, Rhode Island, lining the banks of the Blackstone Canal just north of the Rhode Island State House. It consists of the few surviving buildings of the once-extensive American Screw Company complex, which was largely developed between the 1840s and 1870s, and was a major fixture in the Providence landscape prior to its destruction by fire in 1971. The buildings are in an area bounded by Charles Street on the west, Stevens and Hewes Streets on the north, North Main Street to the east, and Mill Street to the south. Prominent among them are the Stillman White Foundry and Fletcher Manufacturing Company office building, which stand on opposite sides of Mill Street near its crossing of the canal. At 127 Charles Street stands a three-story brick building built c. 1900 as a retail and residential building. The only surviving elements of the Screw Company complex are located at North Main and Hewes Streets, and now house the Providence Center.

The district was listed on the National Register of Historic Places in 1970, at which time more of the Screw Company buildings were standing. This initial listing excluded the three buildings on Mill Street and Charles Street, which were added in a 1972 amendment.

== See also ==
- National Register of Historic Places listings in Providence, Rhode Island
