= Millville, Massachusetts =

- Town
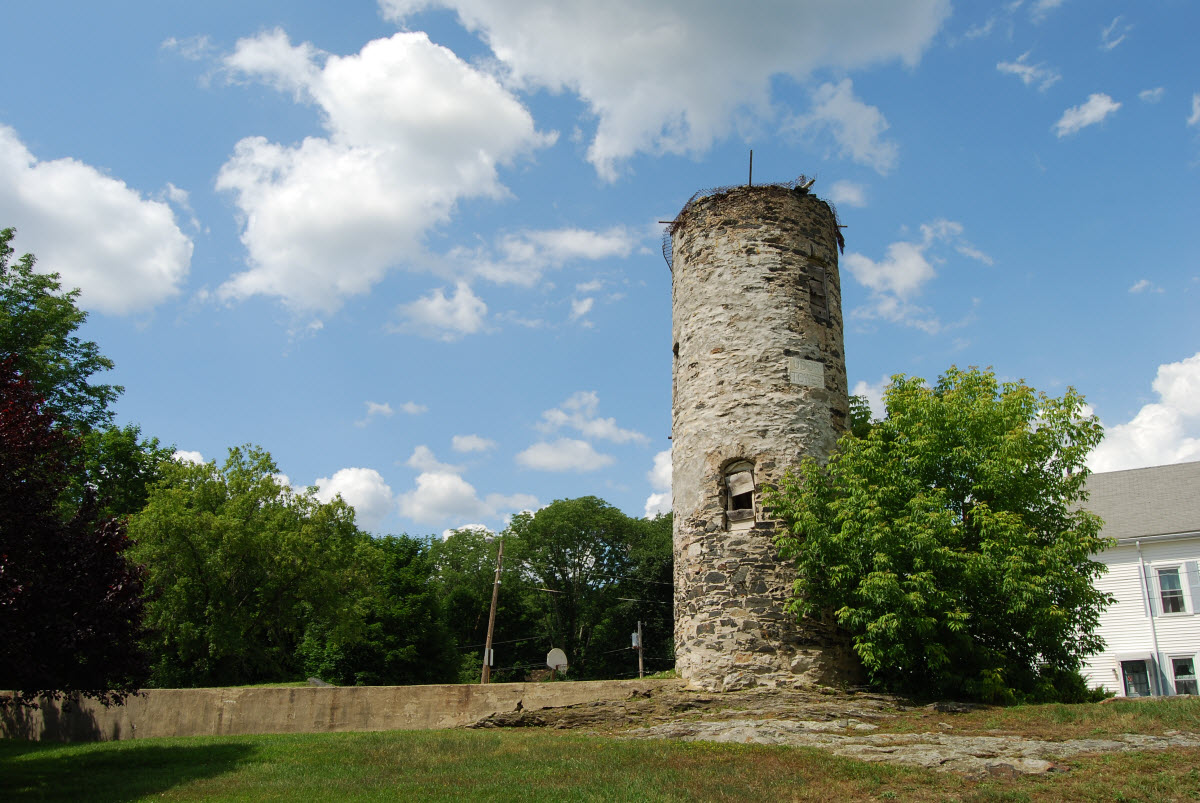
- Udor Tower, Millville

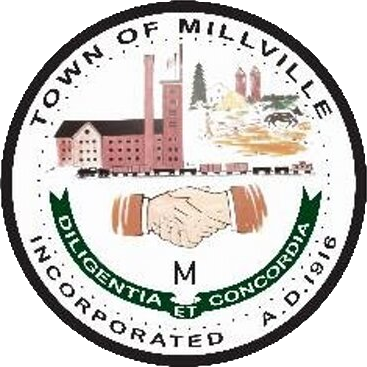
- Seal
- Motto(s): Diligentia et Concordia (Latin) "Diligence and Harmony"
- Location in Worcester County and the state of Massachusetts.
- Coordinates: 42°01′40″N 71°34′53″W
- Country: United States
- State: Massachusetts
- County: Worcester
- Settled: 1662
- Incorporated: 1916

Government
  - Type: Open town meeting

Area
  - Total: 5.0 sq mi (12.9 km^{2})
  - Land: 4.9 sq mi (12.8 km^{2})
  - Water: 0.077 sq mi (0.2 km^{2})
- Elevation: 230 ft (70 m)

Population (2020)
  - Total: 3,174
  - Density: 642/sq mi (248/km^{2})
- Time zone: UTC-5 (Eastern)
  - Summer (DST): UTC-4 (Eastern)
- ZIP code: 01529
- Area code: 508 / 774
- FIPS code: 25-41585
- GNIS feature ID: 0618374
- Website: http://www.millvillema.org/

Millville is a town in Worcester County, Massachusetts, United States. The population was 3,174 at the 2020 census. It is part of the Providence metropolitan area.

== History ==
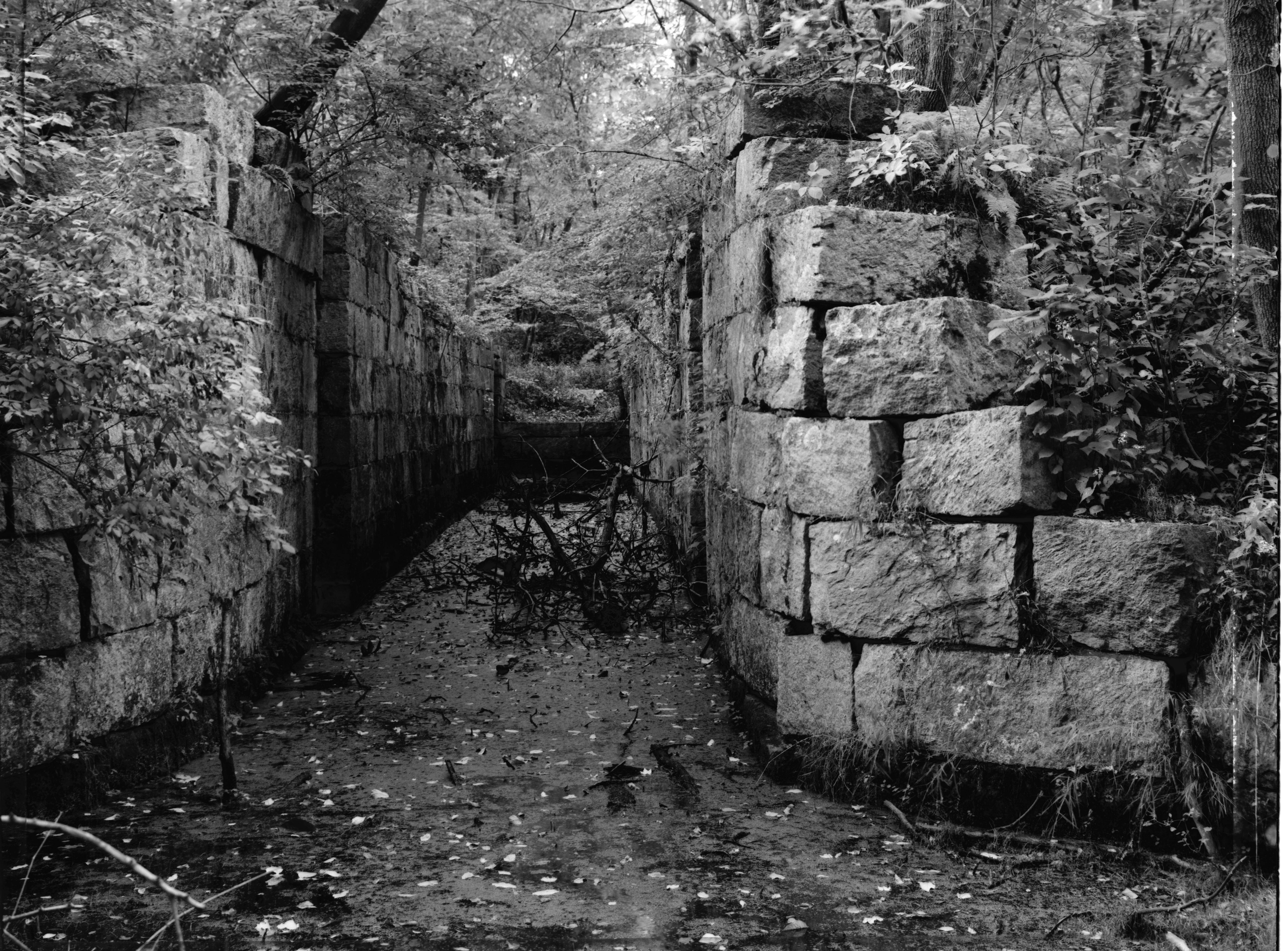
Millville Lock, Blackstone Canal

Millville was first settled in 1662, and officially incorporated in 1916 by division from Blackstone, Massachusetts (which had itself originally been part of Mendon). This region was originally inhabited by the Nipmuc people.

Millville is in the Blackstone River Valley National Heritage Corridor and has a well-preserved lock which was used on the Blackstone Canal in the early 19th century. It also has a historic Friends Meetinghouse. In the first two decades of the 20th century, baseball great Gabby Hartnett, born in Woonsocket, Rhode Island, grew up in Millville, played youth baseball in the Blackstone Valley League, and played for the Chicago Cubs, beginning in 1922. It has recently been discovered that the town's population in the early 1900s until around 1980 was almost 98% Irish Catholic. A Swedish population evidently settled here, and a local cemetery in Uxbridge was their burial site, Norden cemetery, near the Millville line.

== Geography ==
According to the United States Census Bureau, the town has a total area of 5.0 square miles (13 km^{2}), of which 4.9 square miles (13 km^{2}) is land and 0.1 square miles (0.26 km^{2}), or 1.40%, is water.

== Demographics ==
Historical population
Year	Pop.	±%
1920	2,224	—
1930	2,111	−5.1%
1940	1,722	−18.4%
1950	1,692	−1.7%
1960	1,567	−7.4%
1970	1,764	+12.6%
1980	1,693	−4.0%
1990	2,236	+32.1%
2000	2,724	+21.8%
2010	3,190	+17.1%
2020	3,174	−0.5%
2022*	3,147	−0.9%
* = population estimate. Source: United States Census records and Population Estimates Program data.

As of the census of 2000, there were 2,724 people, 923 households, and 719 families residing in the town. The population density was 552.1 inhabitants per square mile (213.2/km^{2}). There were 958 housing units at an average density of 194.2 per square mile (75.0/km^{2}). The racial makeup of the town was 97.72% White, 0.77% African American, 0.04% Native American, 0.18% Asian, 0.26% from other races, and 1.03% from two or more races. Hispanic or Latino of any race were 0.62% of the population.

There were 923 households, out of which 44.6% had children under the age of 18 living with them, 63.8% were married couples living together, 9.8% had a female householder with no husband present, and 22.0% were non-families. 15.5% of all households were made up of individuals, and 5.9% had someone living alone who was 65 years of age or older. The average household size was 2.95 and the average family size was 3.33.

In the town, the population was spread out, with 31.2% under the age of 18, 6.1% from 18 to 24, 37.1% from 25 to 44, 17.5% from 45 to 64, and 8.1% who were 65 years of age or older. The median age was 34 years. For every 100 females, there were 96.3 males. For every 100 females age 18 and over, there were 93.3 males.

The median income for a household in the town was $57,000, and the median income for a family was $61,513. Males had a median income of $42,407 versus $29,758 for females. The per capita income for the town was $20,497. About 4.6% of families and 5.8% of the population were below the poverty line, including 6.6% of those under age 18 and 9.1% of those age 65 or over.

== Adjacent towns ==
- Blackstone, Massachusetts
- Mendon, Massachusetts
- North Smithfield, Rhode Island
- Uxbridge, Massachusetts

== Government ==
State government
State Representative(s):	Mike Soter (R)
State Senator(s):	Ryan Fattman (R)
Governor's Councilor(s):	Paul DePalo (D)
Federal government
U.S. Representative(s):	Jim McGovern (D-2nd District),
U.S. Senators:	Elizabeth Warren (D), Ed Markey (D)

== Library ==
The Millville public library, located off Route 122, was established in 1919. In fiscal year 2008, the town of Millville spent 0.78% ($36,100) of its budget on its public library—approximately $12 per person, per year ($14.70 adjusted for inflation to 2021).

== Education ==
Millville shares their school system with Blackstone. High schoolers in grades 9–12 are also eligible to attend a vocational school, Blackstone Valley Regional Vocational Technical High School.
