= West River (Massachusetts) =

River in Massachusetts, US

Coordinates: 42.065°N 71.613°W

The West River, in the US state of Massachusetts, is a 13.4-mile-long (21.6 km) tributary of the Blackstone River.

== Course ==
It originates in the towns of Grafton and Upton, Massachusetts, near the Upton State Forest, at Silver Lake and Cider Mill Pond in Grafton, and crosses into the eastern portion of Northbridge, passes through the eastern portion of Uxbridge where the West Hill Dam provides flood control, and enters into the Blackstone River south of Uxbridge and Wheelockville before the Blackstone enters the state of Rhode Island.

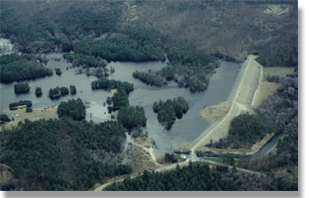
The West Hill Dam and the West River

A wildlife preserve with fishing, hiking and recreation trails are found at a federal recreation area created at the West Hill Dam. The West River Reservoir is well known for fishing.

== History ==
The West River provided water power at the outset of the American Industrial Revolution, providing power to a textile mill founded by Luke Taft in 1825, which later became the site of the Waucantuck Mill Complex where wash and wear fabrics originated. About 1810 Taft's father-in-law, Daniel Day, started an early wool-carding mill where the West River joins the Blackstone River. The Daniel Day woolen mill was one of the first US woolen mills. The Blackstone River Valley is a U.S. National Heritage Area and a major contributing region to America's Industrial Revolution.

== See also ==
- West Hill Dam
- Blackstone River
- List of rivers of Massachusetts
