= Daniel Day (manufacturer) =

American textile manufacturer (1767–1848)

- Born: March 3, 1767; Mendon, Massachusetts, British America
- Died: October 26, 1848 (aged 81); Uxbridge, Massachusetts, USA
- Occupation: Early American Textile Pioneer
- Known for: Established first woolen mill in the Blackstone Valley, (second only to Slater's cotton mill)
- Spouse: Sylvia Wheelock
- Children: two sons, and two daughter
- Parent(s): Joseph Day and Debra Taft

Daniel Day (1767 in Mendon Massachusetts – October 26, 1848 at Uxbridge, Worcester County, Massachusetts) was an American pioneer in woolen manufacturing.

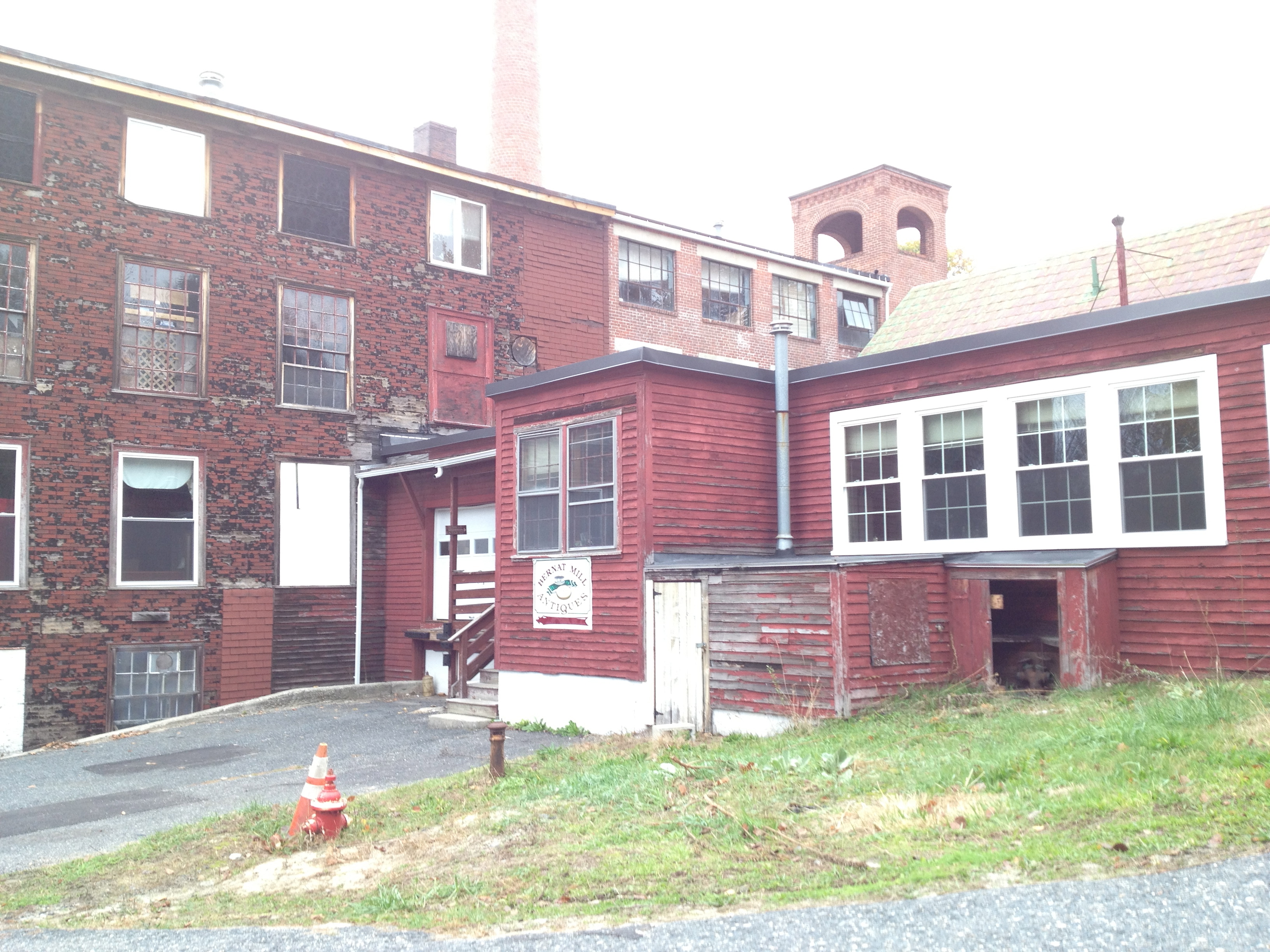
Daniel Day started the first woolen mill in the Blackstone Valley at this site in Uxbridge in 1809. The mill was also known as "Scott's Mill

== Family ==
Daniel Day was born in Mendon, MA and was the son of Joseph Day and Deborah Taft. He married Sylvia Wheelock, and they had two sons and two daughters, both born in Mendon up until 1800, (according to the Mendon vital records). He was a 4th generation descendant of the original Taft family in America, Robert Taft Sr., who had settled in the western section of Mendon in 1679.

== Career and history ==
At the age of 43, Daniel Day established one of the oldest woolen mills in the United States, the Daniel Day Mill. He built a dam along the West River (Massachusetts) and near the dam he built the woolen carding mill. Today the site is generally known as "Elmdale"" and is just south of the main village of Wheelockville, and "Hecla", off of Elmdale Road, at Scott's Lane, in the town of Uxbridge. Pliny Earle I, had developed carding machines at Leicester, Massachusetts, near Worcester, as early as the 1780s. Daniel Day's wool carding mill was only the second mill established in the historic Blackstone River Valley, considered a major contributor to the Industrial Revolution in the U.S.

'Elmdale' near Wheelockville, was the site of the Daniel Day Mill, the first textile mill in Uxbridge, the first woolen mill in the valley(1809), the second oldest woolen mill in Massachusetts, (after one in Watertown, MA), the third textile mill in the state, and third oldest woolen mill in U.S. (after a worsted mill in Hartford). This system of mills, dams and villages was developed by John and Samuel Slater, and became known as the Rhode Island System. There was only one other mill, a cotton mill, that was established in Uxbridge that year, which was the Clapp Mill on the Mumford River. His son Joseph, born in 1790, joined the business, along with Jerry Wheelock. Quickly a loom was added to the carding machine works by 1811, and they later greatly enlarged the mill by 1825.

One of Daniel Day's children, his daughter, married Luke Taft, who started another famous Mill in Uxbridge, The Luke Taft Mill, later known as the Waucantuck Mill. Luke Taft was a descendant of the famous American Taft family which had its roots in Mendon and Uxbridge. Daniel Day was also an ancestor of a branch of the Wheelock family which established an early factory continues in business in the 21st Century, as Berroco, Inc, now headquartered in nearby North Smithfield, Rhode Island.

== Death and afterwards ==
The death of Daniel Day is recorded in the Uxbridge Vital Records. It also contains clues about one of his children, and he is listed as a widower, who died on October 26, 1848, of Consumption or Tuberculosis, at the age of 81. This is from page 369 of Uxbridge Vital Records thru 1850. His wife Sylvia Day died in 1842 at the age of 77. His son Peter died in 1815, at age 23.
