= Oliver's Story =

1978 romantic drama film directed by John Korty

- Theatrical release poster
- Directed by: John Korty
- Written by: Erich Segal; John Korty
- Based on: Oliver's Story by Erich Segal
- Produced by: David V. Picker
- Starring: Ryan O'Neal; Candice Bergen; Nicola Pagett; Ray Milland
- Cinematography: Arthur Ornitz
- Edited by: Stuart H. Pappé
- Music by: Lee Holdridge; Francis Lai
- Production company: Paramount Pictures
- Distributed by: Paramount Pictures
- Release date: December 15, 1978
- Running time: 91 minutes
- Country: United States
- Language: English
- Budget: $6 million
- Box office: $16.2 million

Oliver's Story is a 1978 American romantic drama film and a sequel to Love Story (1970) based on a novel by Erich Segal published a year earlier. It was directed by John Korty and again starred Ryan O'Neal, this time opposite Candice Bergen. The original music score was composed by Lee Holdridge and Francis Lai. It was released by Paramount Pictures on December 15, 1978.

This film's promotional tagline is: "It takes someone very special to help you forget someone very special."

== Plot ==
Oliver Barrett IV is emotionally devastated by the death of his young wife, Jenny Cavilleri, who succumbed to leukemia. As he tries to lose himself in his work as a lawyer, the long hours do not ease his pain, especially when he finds that his views conflict with those of the senior partners at the firm.

Oliver's inconsolable grief begins to alienate those around him, at least until he finds new love with Marcie Bonwit, the wealthy and beautiful heiress to the Bonwit Teller fortune. Despite his affection for her, Oliver finds it difficult to leave the memory of Jenny behind, which causes many problems in their relationship, even as he concurrently begins a reconciliation with his autocratic father Oliver III. Though Oliver and Marcie eventually part, Oliver and his father are reconciled when both men discover surprising things they never knew about each other and Oliver finally joins Barrett Enterprises.

== Cast ==
- Ryan O'Neal as Oliver Barrett IV
- Candice Bergen as Marcie Bonwit
- Nicola Pagett as Joanna Stone
- Ed Binns as Phil Cavilleri
- Benson Fong as John Hsiang
- Charles Haid as Stephen Simpson
- Kenneth McMillan as Jamie Francis
- Ray Milland as Oliver Barrett III
- Josef Sommer as Dr. Dienhart
- Sully Boyar as Mr. Gentilano
- Swoosie Kurtz as Gwen Simpson
- Meg Mundy as Mrs. Barrett
- Beatrice Winde as Waltereen
- Father Frank Toste as Father Giamatti

== Production ==
=== Development ===
Rights to the project were legally complicated: because Paramount had bought Erich Segal's original screenplay for Love Story and the novel Oliver's Story was written afterwards, the studio retained the sequel rights to the characters, i.e. it could make a sequel using the same characters. However Segal could still write his own sequel book. Paramount had first refusal rights on Segal's book, but if they refused his offer, Segal could take the project to another producer.

Segal was reported as working on a screenplay sequel to Love Story called Oliver's Story as early as 1972. However Segal wound up writing the novel version first although "it took me five years of trembling and fear to start," he said. "I was terrified of the curse of the second novel." In the meantime, Paramount had other writers prepare possible sequels to Love Story.

Writing the book of Oliver's Story took Segal two and a half years "because I didn't have an ending". He said he wrote "every word" of the book "with Ryan O'Neal in mind. And in my mind's eye I also saw [Ray] Milland and [John] Marley in their roles" and he felt Candice Bergen would have been ideal for the lead female role Marcie Bonwit. The novel was published in February 1977 and became a best seller. Segal said various studios were unhappy with the book as a film project because "no one dies".

Paramount had the right to match anyone's offer for a sequel, but Segal demanded $5.5 million for the rights and the studio refused to pay it. Instead Paramount commissioned David Newman and his wife Leslie to write an original screenplay using the characters from Love Story. In September 1977 Segal said he was writing the screenplay version of Oliver's Story which he had sold, without Paramount's involvement, to Lew Grade, to make, possible for television.

This meant there was a chance for two rival Love Story projects - Oliver's Story, from the Segal novel, and a Paramount sequel, Love Story Two, not from the novel. Don Simpson, vice president of production at Paramount, said the studio had four screenplays in total under consideration for the sequel (this presumably included the script from the Newmans), plus the sole right to use Ryan O'Neal's services. Segal felt a version of Oliver's Story could have been made without O'Neal but Simpson argued "anybody who goes out and does a sequel without O'Neal is going to fall flat on their face at the box office."

Paramount had offered Ryan O'Neal a reported $3.5 million to reprise his role in a sequel. Segal commented, "They'll have to hire a UCLA film school student to direct because that's the only other talent they'd be able to afford." Don Simpson wanted Arthur Hiller to direct while Segal's choice of director was Claude Lelouch. Segal's preference for the female lead role of Marcie was Candice Bergen although rumors at the time had Farrah Fawcett as the favorite.

Michael Eisner, head of Paramount, said "one way or another we're doing a sequel to Love Story," adding, "I happen to like Oliver's Story but nothing is more presold than the movie and the original book. I think Oliver's Story can only help the momentum of the property that Paramount exclusively owns." Segal in turn threatened to sue Paramount if the studio made a sequel without his involvement.

In August 1977 Segal said Lew Grade had bought the rights to Oliver's Story for $1 million and that filming on the project would start on 15 October 1977, possibly starring Richard Jordan or Jan-Michael Vincent as Oliver Barrett IV and Jacqueline Bisset as the female lead, with Charles Jarrott most likely to direct.

By September, however, it was announced that Lew Grade had relinquished his rights to the project and Segal and Paramount had come to terms - the studio would adapt Oliver's Story. Segal had dropped his price to $1.5 million. David Picker, who had been president of Paramount Pictures, was given the project to produce as a "going away present".

O'Neal refused to star in the film, however, saying he was unhappy with the script. "It was just a rehash of the book, which hadn't interested me," he said. He added, "I just don't think Segal did a good job of catching him. Oliver is a real hard guy to follow."

In January 1978 it was announced John Korty would direct Oliver's Story and that Paramount would make the film with an unknown male star, while O'Neal was going to make The Champ at MGM. Korty was best known for his television movies and low budget feature films. Korty later said he had been approached to direct by Picker. He claims Picker called him up and said, "Erich Segal is writing his own script and I'm pretty sure it's going to be terrible,” so "“I'm looking for somebody to treat it like an independent film... I know your work and I would love to have you direct this with the idea that you'll probably end up writing a script as well, and it's going to be a six or seven million dollar Christmas release from Paramount.”

Although Korty did not like Love Story, he was eager to try his hand at something more commercial and thought the prospect of dealing with Oliver's grief over Jenny Cavilleri (Ali MacGraw)'s death would make for rich thematic material. "I've got enough good reviews to wallpaper several rooms but I've never had enough elements interesting to the public to get people into theatres," said Korty.

Korty went to New York to start casting, seeing a lot of theatre actors. His choices for the leads were William Hurt and Meryl Streep. While David Picker was supportive, Korty says Michael Eisner, then head of Paramount, did not want to cast them as they were unknown. Korty later said, "To this day I think, 'What would that movie have looked like with Meryl Streep and Bill Hurt, you know?'"

O'Neal then pulled out of The Champ and became available. Paramount had Korty rewrite the script and O'Neal agreed to make the film on the basis of the new draft. O'Neal said Korty is "saying more or less the same thing as Erich, but he's answered a lot of questions, a lot of exclamation points." Among the changes Korty made was enlarging the part of Joanna Stone (Nicola Pagett) and ending the film on a romance between her and Oliver. "I wrote and photographed a very upbeat ending in which, as a symbolic gesture, Ryan knocks down a wall in his apartment as a way of opening up his life and starting with this young girl," said Korty.

O'Neal says he was paid less than $3 million for the role, although he received $1 million up front and a share of the profits. "Without O'Neal, Oliver's Story would be a totally different film," said Korty later during filming. "To most people, Ryan O'Neal is Oliver Barrett. That's what's going for us now. They're involved in his life.”

In March 1978 it was reported Paramount hoped to give the female lead to Meryl Streep who had been in Julia but that O'Neal wanted Candice Bergen. O'Neal says Bergen was reluctant to appear in the film and he had to persuade her by giving her one of his points in the film.

The other female lead Joanne was played by Nicola Pagett, who had been in Upstairs, Downstairs and was cast after the filmmakers saw her photo in People magazine and flew her out to the US for a test. Both Bergen and Pagett were only cast after filming had already started, a situation producer David Picker called "very, very scary."

John Marley did not reprise his role as Jenny's father Phil from the original. He and Paramount had come to terms on money but not billing; he was replaced by Edward Binns.

=== Filming ===
Filming began in March 1978 and took place over ten weeks with shooting in New York and Hong Kong.

O'Neal called the film "the other side of the coin to An Unmarried Woman.... I just hope the film doesn't offend or insult anyone's intelligence. We're not doing a rip off - this isn't just another sharp."

A number of scenes were filmed in Massachusetts. The Stanley Woolen Mill in Uxbridge, Massachusetts, and other locations in that community were used for this film. Oliver's law offices were those occupied at the time by the New York firm of Davis Polk & Wardwell. The Bonwit Teller store in Eastchester, New York was also used as a shoot location. Filming also took place in New York City and Hong Kong.

"Oliver's Story is the easiest thing I've ever done," said O'Neal during filming. "Love Story was the next easiest. I knew the part. It was a reactive kind of character, and there was a lot to react to."

=== Post production ===
In the original draft of the film, O'Neal's character Oliver was meant to end up with Joanna, the character played by Nicola Pagett. However, on viewing the movie the filmmakers felt it was not plausible that O'Neal would go with Pagett after being with the more beautiful Candice Bergen, so they removed these scenes from the movie.

Korty said "It's the only time I had a serious cutting problems and you know I could have fought it. The DGA's [Directors Guild of America] rules about so many things are nice to have, but of course they can't overcome power politics. And in this case I had very little power. And unfortunately David Picker went along with the Paramount executives... So the movie that came out is almost necrophilia. You know, it's Ryan on a bridge mourning the loss of Jenny."

== Critical reception ==
Unlike the original film, Oliver's Story was poorly reviewed and was not successful at the box office. On Rotten Tomatoes the film has an approval rating of 22% based on reviews from nine critics.

O'Neal thought a major reason behind the film's failure was that the character played by Nicola Pagett was cut out of the last third.

Korty said the film "was a big failure, and they all blamed me. Lots of critics [said], 'How could you have ended the film this way?' Well, that wasn't my ending, but I had no choice because it was a $7 million picture and Paramount was in the driver’s seat."

Erich Segal had "loved the way the film" of Love Story had turned out, in part because he was involved in the filming process. However, with Oliver's Story he says "Paramount bought it, said 'Thanks a lot, we'll see you at the premiere' and that was that." In 1980 Segal claims he never saw the film. "After I read the script I knew I wouldn't want to see it."

== Soundtrack ==
Oliver's Story (Music from the Original Soundtrack of the Paramount Picture)

Soundtrack album
- Released: December 1978
- Recorded: 1978
- Genre: Soundtrack
- Length: 27:55
- Label: ABC Records
- Producer: Lee Holdridge

Oliver's Story soundtrack was released on vinyl and cassette tape by ABC Records in December 1978.

Side 1:

- "Prologue" – Francis Lai (1:58)
- "Theme from Love Story" – Francis Lai (2:06)
- "Love Theme from Oliver's Story (Oliver's Theme)" – Francis Lai (2:12)
- "Night Drive to Cambridge" – Lee Holdridge (4:35)
- "Oliver's Childhood Room" – Lee Holdridge (1:25)
- "Love at the Red Apple (Oliver's Theme)" – Francis Lai (3:51)

Side 2:

- "Love Theme From Oliver's Story (Oliver's Theme)" – Francis Lai (3:02)
- "Hong Kong Park" – Lee Holdridge (0:53)
- "Tentative Feelings (Oliver's Theme)" – Francis Lai, Lee Holdridge (1:59)
- "Tennis, Jogging, and Singles Bars (Oliver's Theme)" – Francis Lai, Lee Holdridge (2:14)
- "Montage of Moments" – Francis Lai, Lee Holdridge (5:40)
