= Greater Worcester Land Trust =

Coordinates: 42°15′23.7″N 71°47′55.8″W

Founded in Worcester, Massachusetts in 1987, the Greater Worcester Land Trust is a non-profit land conservation organization dedicated to the protection of important lands in Worcester and the surrounding towns (the two concentric rings around the City of Worcester). As a conservation land trust the trust's properties are managed simultaneously for wildlife habitat and passive recreation (hiking trails, walking, cross-country skiing, snow-shoeing, birdwatching, etc.)

GWLT is primarily a volunteer based organization with a volunteer Board of Directors, Volunteer Conservation Ranger's who monitor the Trust's holdings, and GWLT Volunteers who blaze trails, install signs and waterbars, and redress illegal activities like dumping or erosion due to motorized vehicles.

The Trust manages 1,271 acres (5.14 km^{2}) of land and monitors 950 acres (3.8 km^{2}) of Conservation Restrictions (called Conservation Easements outside the Commonwealth of Massachusetts) in Worcester, Leicester, Spencer, Paxton, Holden, Boylston, West Boylston, Auburn, Grafton, and Charlton. The Trust has also been responsible for the preservation and transfer to state ownership of 380 acres (1.5 km^{2}) of conservation land, and to the City of Worcester Reservoir division of 110 acres (0.45 km^{2}).

In 2009 the Greater Worcester Land Trust and the West Boylston Land Trust merged their conservation holdings and membership.

In 2019 the Greater Worcester Land Trust and the Paxton Land Trust merged their conservation holdings and membership.

The Trust's headquarters are on the first floor of 4 Ash Street, Worcester, Massachusetts 01608.

Area partners and sister trusts:

- Charlton Heritage Preservation Trust
- Clinton Greenway Conservation Trust
- Dudley Conservation Land Trust
- East Quabbin Land Trust
- Grafton Land Trust
- Metacomet Land Trust
- Opacum Land Trust
- Princeton Land Trust
- Rutland Land Conservancy
- Sterling Land Trust
- Sudbury Valley Trustees
- White Oak Land Conservation Society
