= Luke Taft =

American textile pioneer (1783–1863)

- Born: June 3, 1783; Uxbridge, Massachusetts, US
- Died: April 7, 1863 (aged 79); Uxbridge, Massachusetts, US
- Occupation: Textile pioneer
- Known for: Established two early water-powered woolen mills at Uxbridge
- Spouse(s): Mercy (Day) Taft, and Nancy (Wood) Taft
- Children: 5, including Moses Taft

Luke Taft (3 June 1783 – 7 April 1863) was an industrial pioneer in the manufacture of woolens in 19th century New England.

== Family ==
Luke Taft was a fifth-generation descendant of Robert Taft I, of the American Taft family. Robert Taft I had settled from England in the western section of Mendon in 1679 which later became Uxbridge in 1727. Luke was the son of Esther and James Taft of Uxbridge, and born into a family of eight other siblings. Luke Taft married Daniel Day and Sylvia (Wheelock) Day's daughter, Mercy Day, and was also subsequently married to Nancy (Wood) Taft. He had a total of five children, including a son, Moses, who was his second born in Uxbridge in January 1812. He also had four other children, James, Joseph, Robert, and a daughter Irene who may have been born from a later marriage.

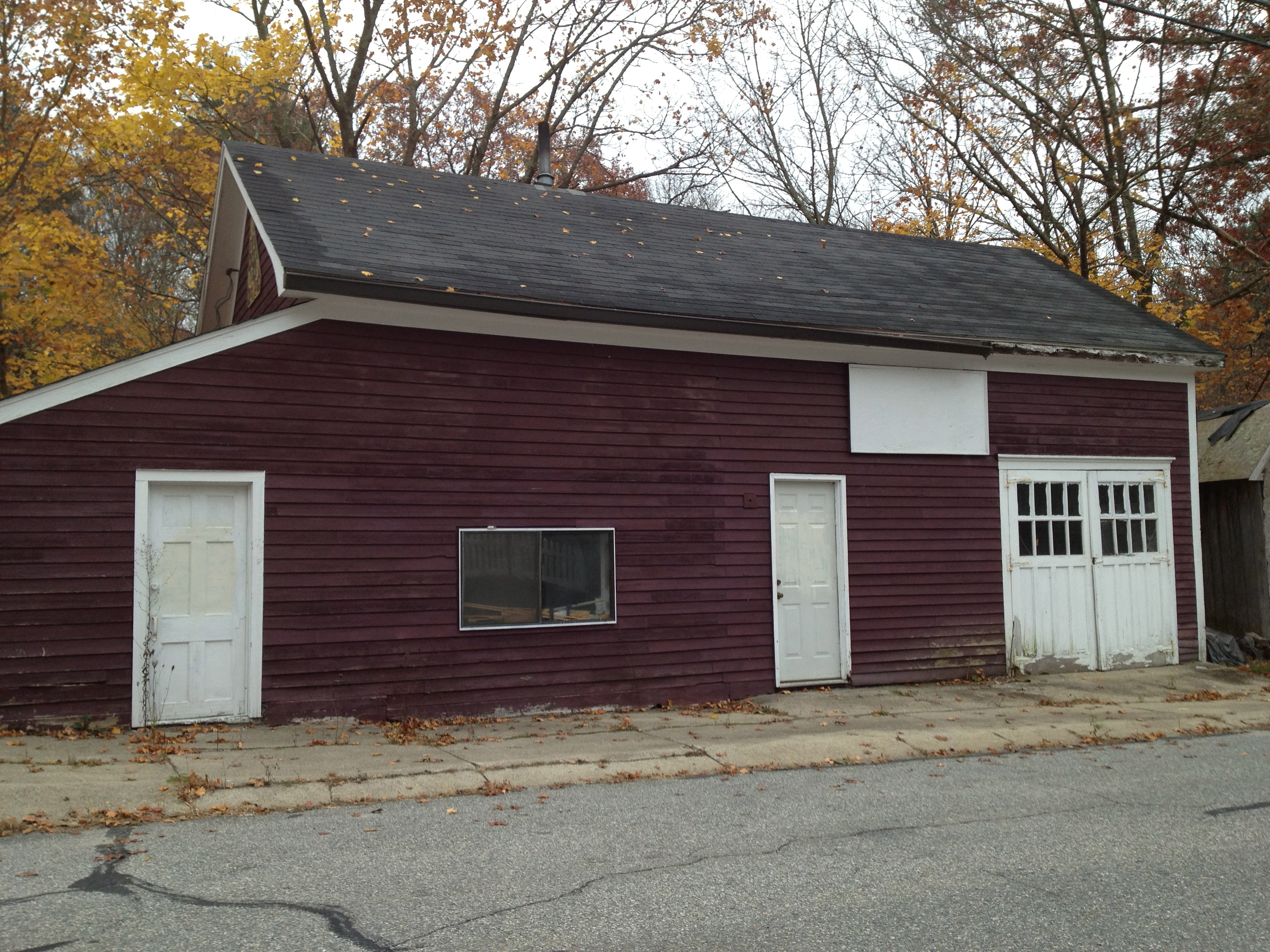
Wakentuck Mill Storage Building, adjacent to West River site where Luke Taft established his first water-powered mill in 1825 in the Wheelockville section of Uxbridge

== Textile mills ==
Luke became an early American industrial pioneer and the builder of two early textile mills. Luke Taft built a dam, and his first textile mill on the West River (Massachusetts), in 1824. This was the third woolen mill in Uxbridge, a very early US industrial center. Luke Taft was the son-in-law of Daniel Day, who had earlier established the first woolen mill in the Blackstone Valley, at Uxbridge, circa 1810. Luke Taft's first textile mill was located near the site of the now former Waucantuck Mill Complex site, a national historic site.

Luke Taft later built a second textile mill in 1833, on the Blackstone River at the site of the present day Stanley Woolen Mill. This mill was also known as the "Luke Taft Mill". Luke's son, Moses Taft, built a larger mill at this same site in 1852.

== A 200-year family enterprise ==
These mills, together with the Daniel Day Mill, and family connections to the Taft and Wheelock families, became the longest-running family-owned textile mills in the Northeastern US (perhaps in the US). Daniel Day was also a member of the Taft family as his mother was Deborah (Taft) Day. Daniel Day's wife was Sylvia (Wheelock) Day. The Wheelock family ownership of this local family-owned textile dynasty continues today under the name of Berroco Inc., a yarn distribution company, headquartered at the site of Daniel's original carding mill until 2010. In that year Berroco moved a few miles south to neighboring North Smithfield, RI, the first planned mill village started by John Slater (industrialist) and Samuel Slater.

== Historic context ==
Uxbridge is in the heart of the Blackstone Valley, a major contributor to the earliest industrialization of the U.S. Luke Taft was a member of the famous Taft family which has its roots in Mendon and Uxbridge. The Waucantuck mill, in later years, became the first manufacturer of "wash and wear" fabric in the U.S. The historic mill town of Uxbridge was noted for leading with many advancements in the textile industry in America including power looms for woolens, complete vertical integration of textiles to clothing lines, blended fabrics and "satinet".

== See also ==
- The Tafts of Mendon and Uxbridge
- List of Registered Historic Places in Uxbridge, Massachusetts.
