= Blackstone River and Canal Heritage State Park =

State park in Massachusetts, United States

- River Bend Farm, Blackstone River and Canal State Park

- Location within Massachusetts Location within the United States
- Location: Worcester County, Massachusetts, United States
- Coordinates: 42°05′40″N 71°37′23″W
- Area: 1,066 acres (431 ha)
- Elevation: 450 ft (140 m)
- Administrator: Massachusetts Department of Conservation and Recreation
- Website: Official website

The Blackstone River and Canal Heritage State Park is a part of the state park system of the Commonwealth of Massachusetts, managed by the Massachusetts Department of Conservation and Recreation. This 1,000-acre (4.0 km^{2}) park "recalls the role of canals in transporting raw materials and manufactured goods between emerging industrial centers." The Blackstone River and Canal Heritage State Park at Uxbridge, Massachusetts, is the midpoint of the Blackstone River Valley National Heritage Corridor of the National Park System. The Blackstone River and Valley is where the industrial revolution was born in America. The southern entrance to this state park is the site of the historic Stanley Woolen Mill, currently being redeveloped for commercial and tourism. The Native American Nipmuc name for the village here was "Wacentug", translated as "bend in the river".

== History ==
=== The Blackstone Canal ===
Transportation of goods from the upper Blackstone Valley was a growing concern by 1818. Teamsters drove huge wagons of textile goods to Woonsocket and to Worcester. John Brown, a Providence Merchant, envisioned the Blackstone Canal from the late 18th century. The Erie Canal was built in Upstate New York, just prior to the construction of the Blackstone Canal. The need for inland transportation from Worcester to Providence finally gave way to an inland waterway, the Blackstone Canal (1828). The 45-mile (72 km) canal connected Worcester to Providence, the closest port. One theory holds that rival industrialists may have prompted the building of the canal to "restrict water rights" for competitors (water powered mills). The canal was built by imported Irish laborers, who worked on the Erie Canal and settled here. It was completed in 1828. The canal was a simple ditch alongside the Blackstone River with a dirt tow path for boats to be pulled by horses. A granite lock stands at Goat Hill, and Uxbridge was the overnight stopping point. The canal connected inland Worcester mills on the Blackstone and Providence where thousands of tons of textiles could be exported all over the world. But, by 1832, the Boston and Worcester Railroad began to carry freight to Boston and the role for the canal diminished. Similar canals were built in the first half of the 19th century including others that have become National Historic Corridors, such as the Illinois and Michigan Canal in northeast Illinois.

In 1847, the Providence and Worcester Railroad opened and completely replaced the canal for transportation. The transformation of transportation from horse drawn teams (origin of the word "teamsters"), to canal barges, to railroads was complete.

== Features ==
There are interpretive services at the park. There are trails that recreate the trails that the Nipmuc, the Native American people of central Massachusetts, used. The River Bend Farm Visitor Center provides a convenient gateway to canoeing, kayaking, fishing, trails, and snowmobiling or cross-country skiing access. National Park Service rangers explain the local history at the River Bend Farm Visitors Center. Nearby Goat Hill provides scenic views and views of remnants of the canal locks and towpaths which can be found here. The nearby Lookout Rock also provides scenic views of the valley and the winding Blackstone River.

== Nearby attractions and features of the park ==
The area includes Rice City and Goat Hill. Goat Hill offers trails for hiking and mountain biking. There is an abundance of wildlife available for viewing. The state park works closely in conjunction with the nearby National Park Service. The Blackstone River Bikeway, now under construction, and the Blackstone Canal towpath, are both slated to be component parts or segments of the 3,000-mile (4,800 km) East Coast Greenway. Outdoor activities are also available at the nearby West Hill Dam and Park.

== Gallery ==
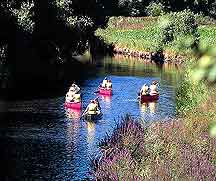
Canoes on the Blackstone Canal

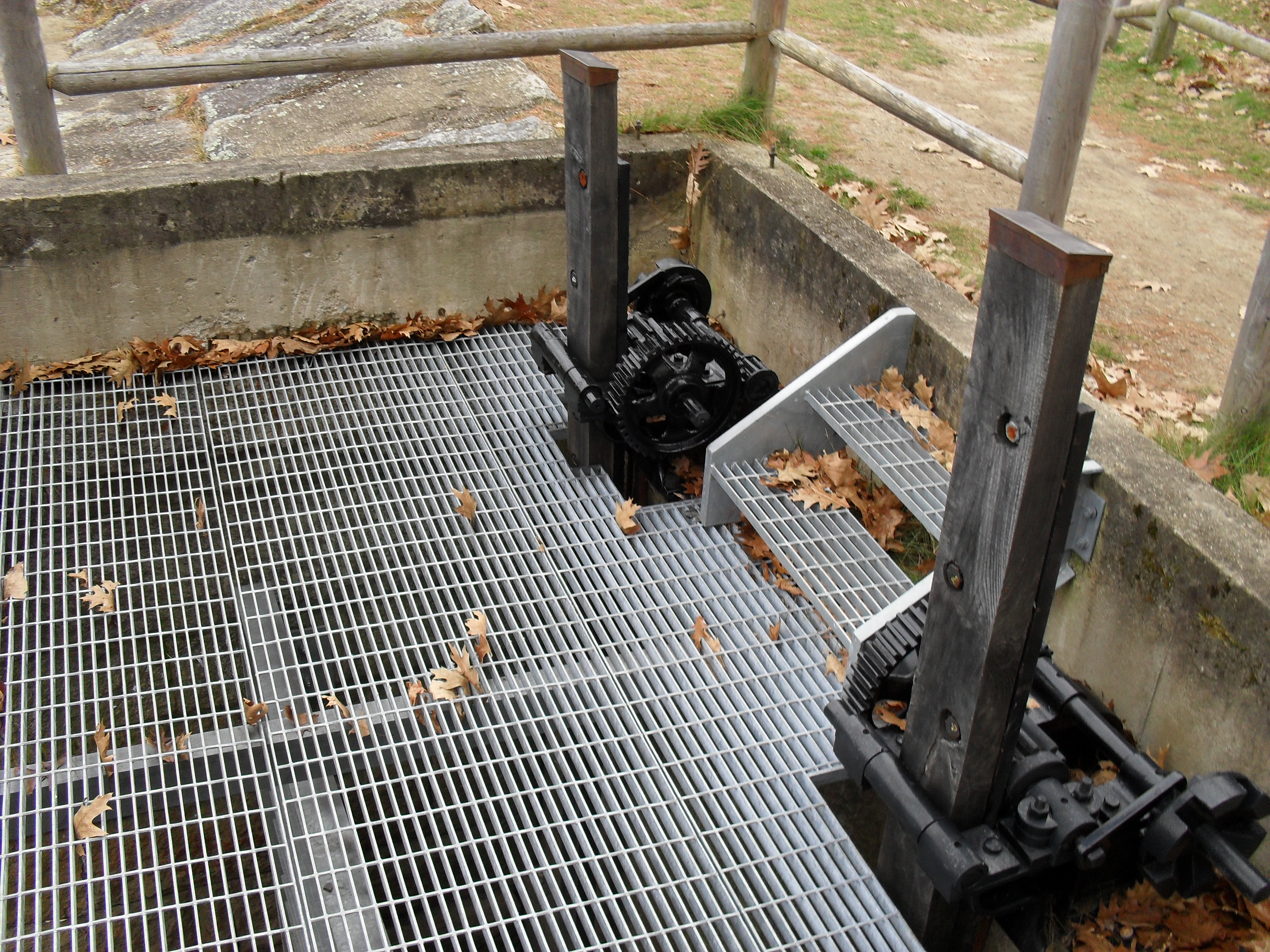
View of a control gate on the Blackstone Canal at the Blackstone River and Canal State Park in Uxbridge

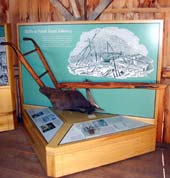
Exhibit of 19th century farm implements at River Bend Farm

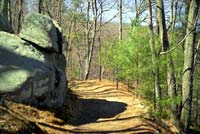
Goat Hill Hill Trail

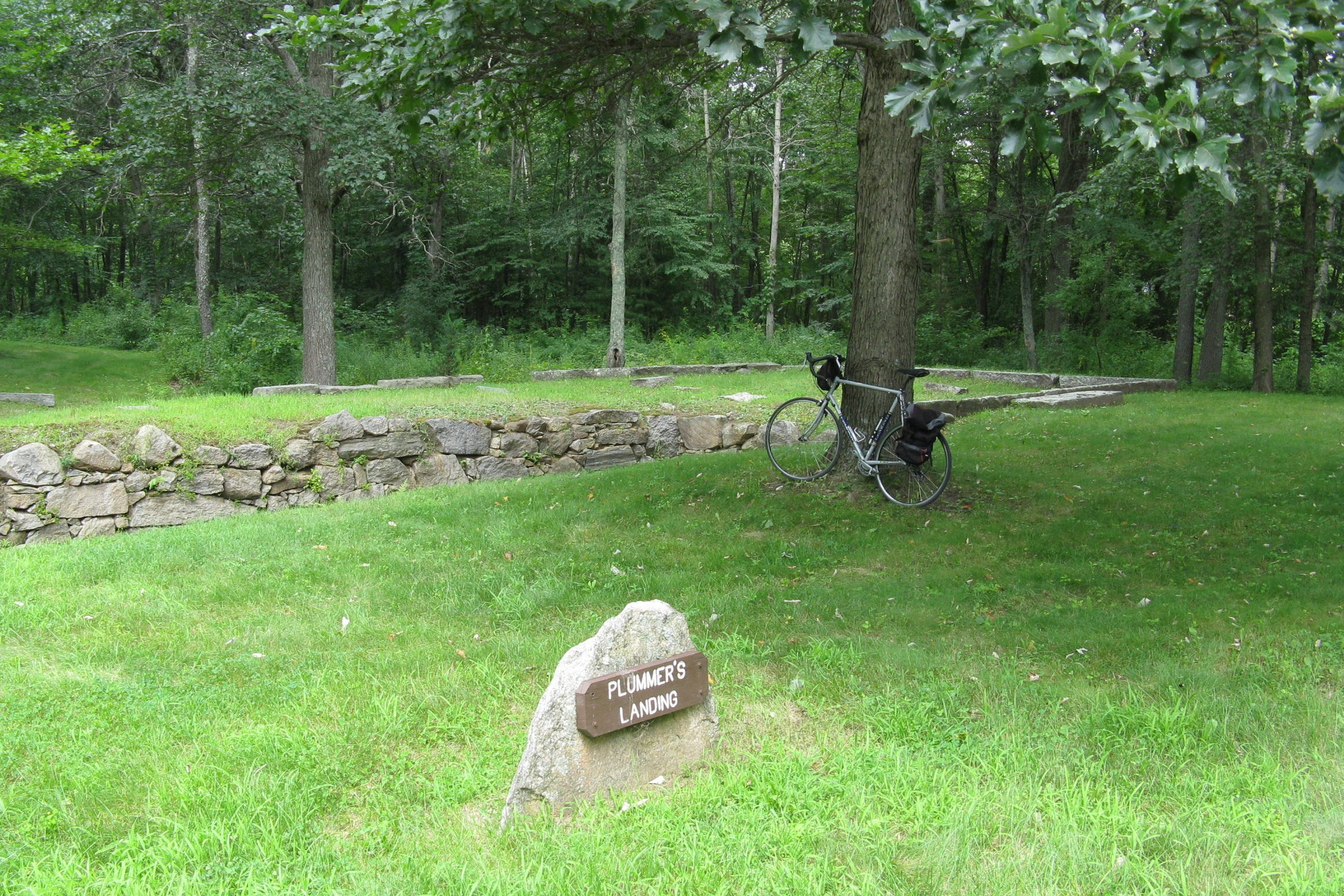
Plummer's Landing in Northbridge

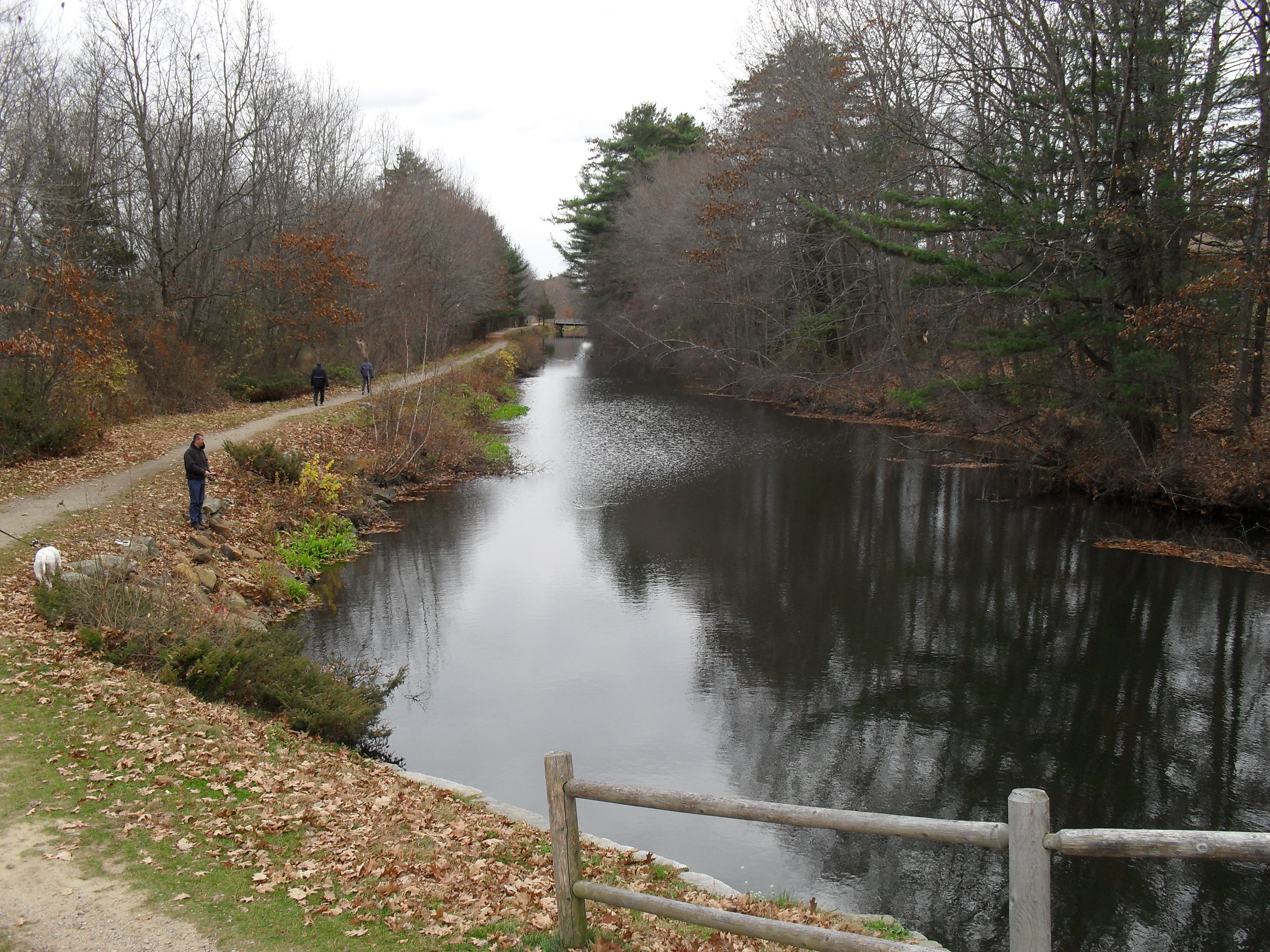
The Blackstone Canal

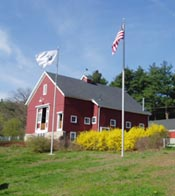
River Bend Farm Interpretive Center at Blacktone River and Canal Heritage State Park

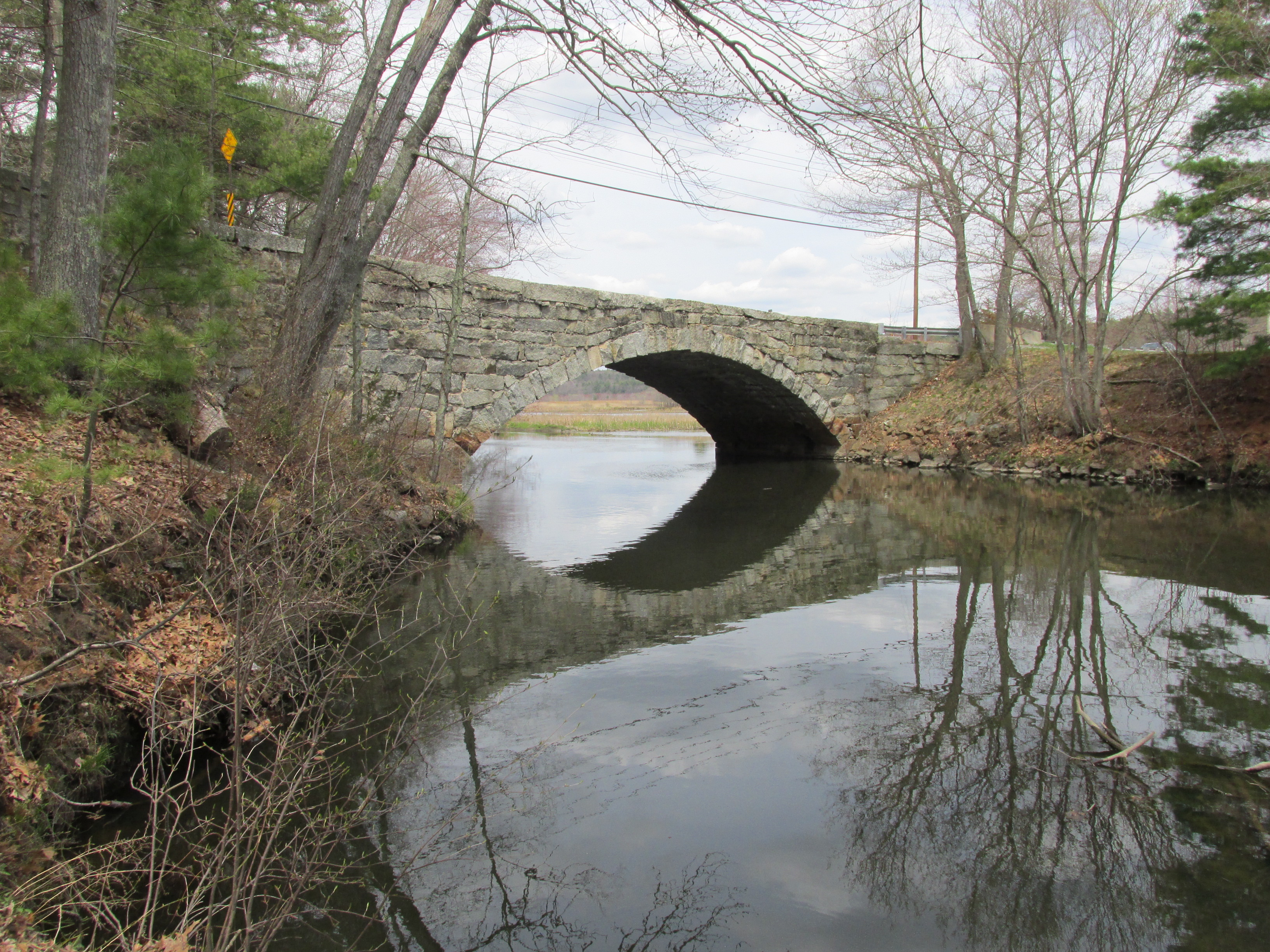
The Taft brothers built the first bridge across the Blackstone River in 1709. This stone arch bridge is a familiar scene walking northward at the Blackstone Canal Heritage State Park.

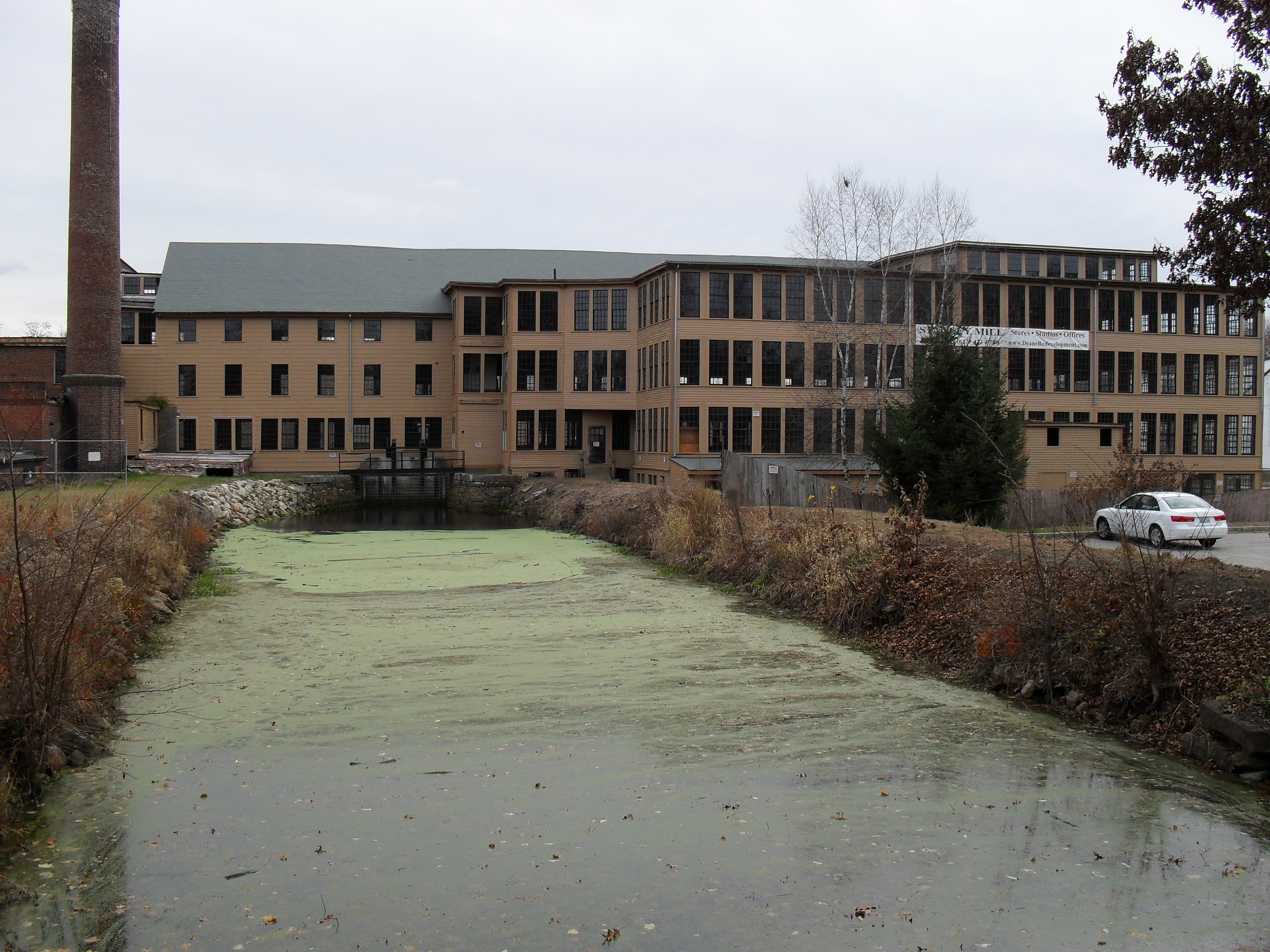
Stanley Woolen Mill, Nov. 11, 2009, Uxbridge, MA, with view of the Blackstone Canal

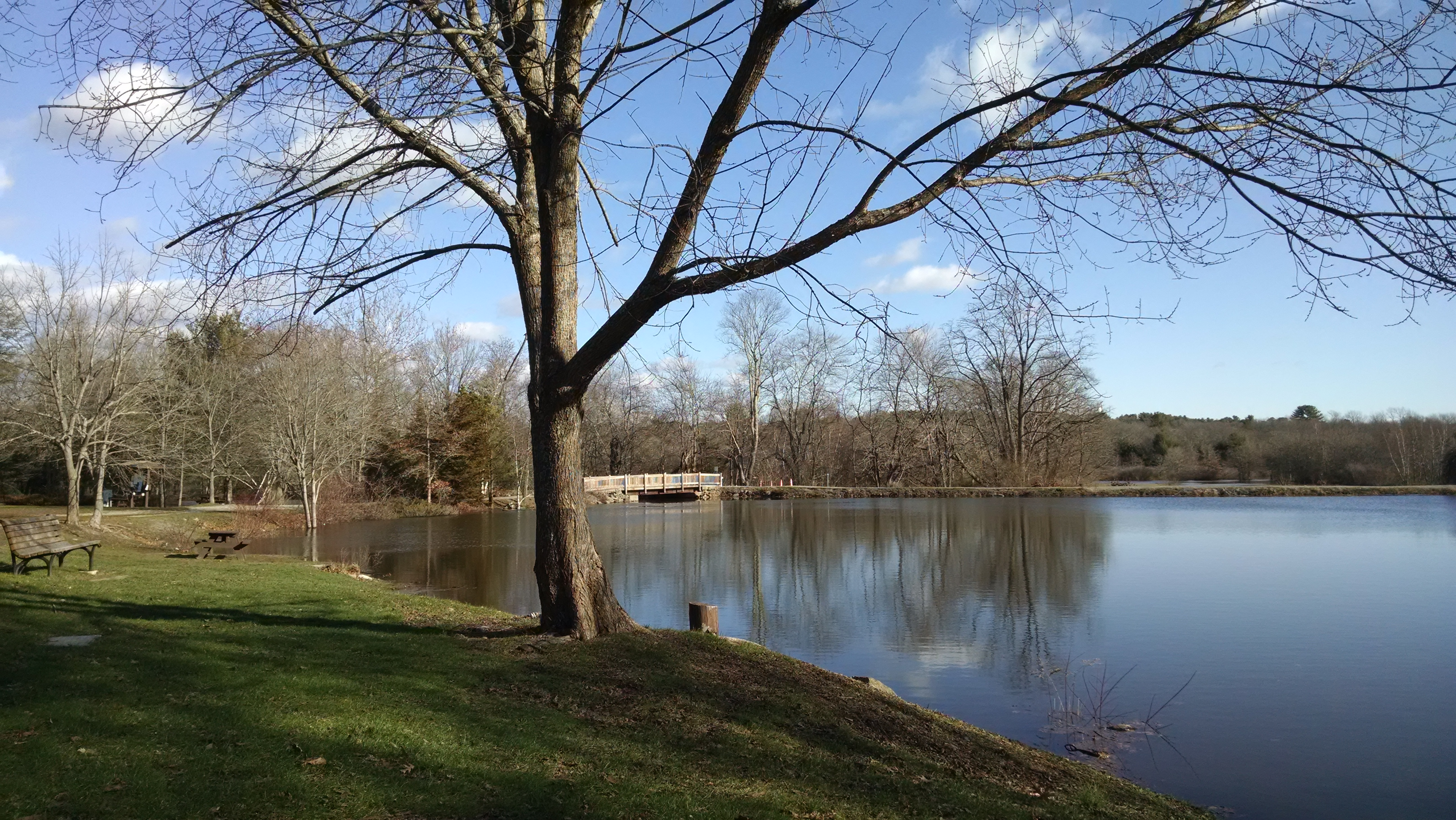
The flooded Blacksone Canal after heavy rain and snowmelt.
