= Blackstone River Valley National Heritage Corridor =

Area dedicated to the history of the early American Industrial Revolution

Coordinates: 42°12′00″N 71°39′58″W

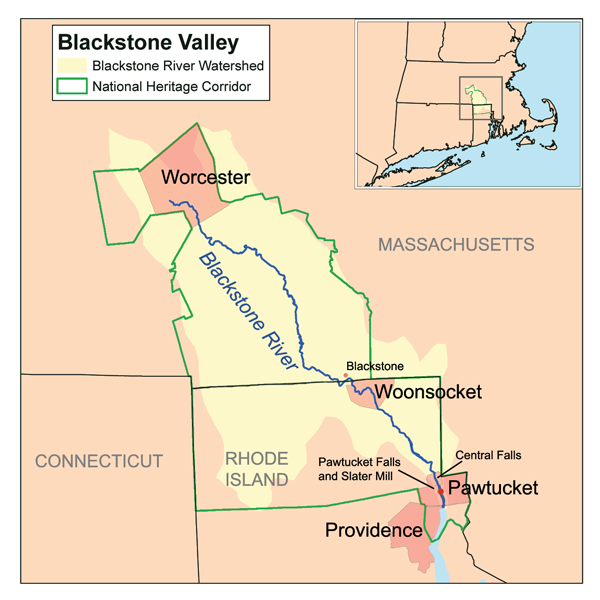
A map of the region

The John H. Chafee Blackstone River Valley National Heritage Corridor is a National Heritage Corridor dedicated to the history of the early American Industrial Revolution, including mill towns stretching across 25 cities and towns (400,000 acres (1,620 km^{2}) in total) near the river's course in Worcester County, Massachusetts, and Providence County, Rhode Island. It makes up a historical area in the Blackstone Valley and is named for the late US Senator from Rhode Island John Chafee. In 2014, the Blackstone River Valley National Historical Park was created out of a smaller portion of the National Heritage Corridor. The two units now exist as cooperative entities. The organization is headquartered at the building in Whitinsville, MA, which is located at 670 Linwood Ave, Whitinsville, MA 01588.

== History ==
River Bend Farm Visitors Center, Blackstone River and Canal State Park, Uxbridge, Massachusetts

The National Corridor was designated by an Act of Congress on November 10, 1986, to preserve and interpret for present and future generations the unique and significant value of the Blackstone Valley. It includes cities, towns, villages and almost one million people. The Federal government does not own or manage any of the land or resources in the corridor as it does in the more traditional national parks. Instead the National Park Service, two state governments, dozens of local municipalities, businesses, nonprofit historical and environmental organizations, educational institutions, many private citizens, and a Blackstone River Valley National Heritage Corridor Commission all work together in partnerships to protect the Valley's special identity and prepare for its future.

The Blackstone River Greenway is a planned 48-mile (77 km) paved rail trail defining the course of the East Coast Greenway through the National Corridor. As of 2017, approximately 11.5 miles (18.5 km) of the greenway has been completed in Rhode Island and 6.9 miles (11.1 km) in Massachusetts.

On October 12, 2006, the National Heritage Areas Act of 2006 was signed by the President, enacting it as Public Law Number 109-338. This legislation extends the Corridor Commission for five years until October 12, 2011.

On July 18, 2011, a report recommended the corridor for national park status.

=== Visitor centers ===
- Blackstone Valley Visitor Center, Pawtucket, Rhode Island (operated by the Blackstone Valley Tourism Council)
- Museum of Work and Culture, Woonsocket, Rhode Island (operated by the Rhode Island Historical Society)
- River Bend Farm Visitor Center at Blackstone River and Canal Heritage State Park, Uxbridge, Massachusetts (operated by Massachusetts Department of Conservation and Recreation)
- Broad Meadow Brook Sanctuary, Worcester, Massachusetts (operated by the Massachusetts Audubon Society)
- Blackstone River Valley National Heritage Corridor Visitor Center, Worcester, Massachusetts (operated by the Blackstone Heritage Corridor, Inc.)

== Corridor cities and towns ==
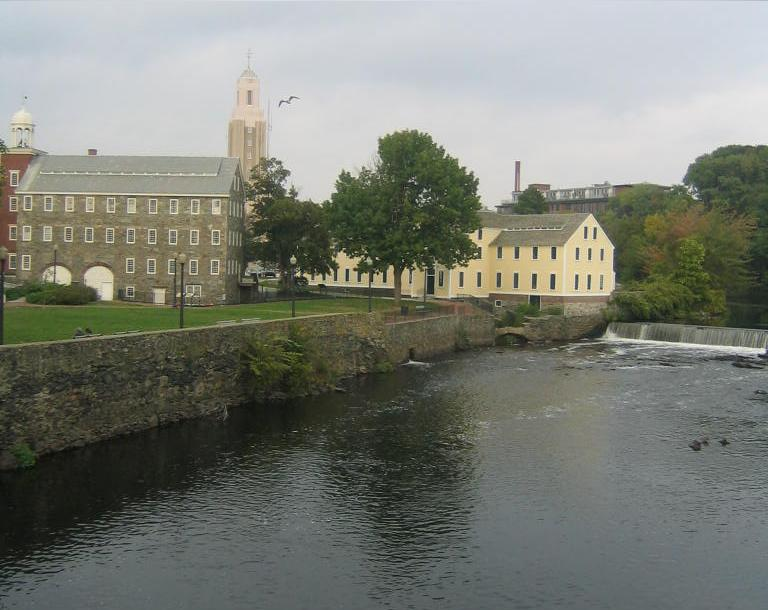
America's first successful water powered textile mill, Slater Mill was founded in Pawtucket, Rhode Island in 1793

Note: In some cases, only a portion of the city or town is included in the Corridor.

=== Massachusetts ===
- Auburn
- Blackstone
- Douglas
- Grafton
- Hopedale
- Leicester
- Mendon
- Milford
- Millbury
- Millville
- Northbridge
- Sutton
- Upton
- Uxbridge
- Worcester

=== Rhode Island ===
- Burrillville
- Central Falls
- Cumberland
- East Providence
- Glocester
- Lincoln
- North Smithfield
- Pawtucket
- Providence
- Smithfield
- Woonsocket

== See also ==
- Greater Worcester Land Trust
