= Blackstone Canal =

Historic canal in Massachusetts and Rhode Island, US

- U.S. National Register of Historic Places
- U.S. Historic district
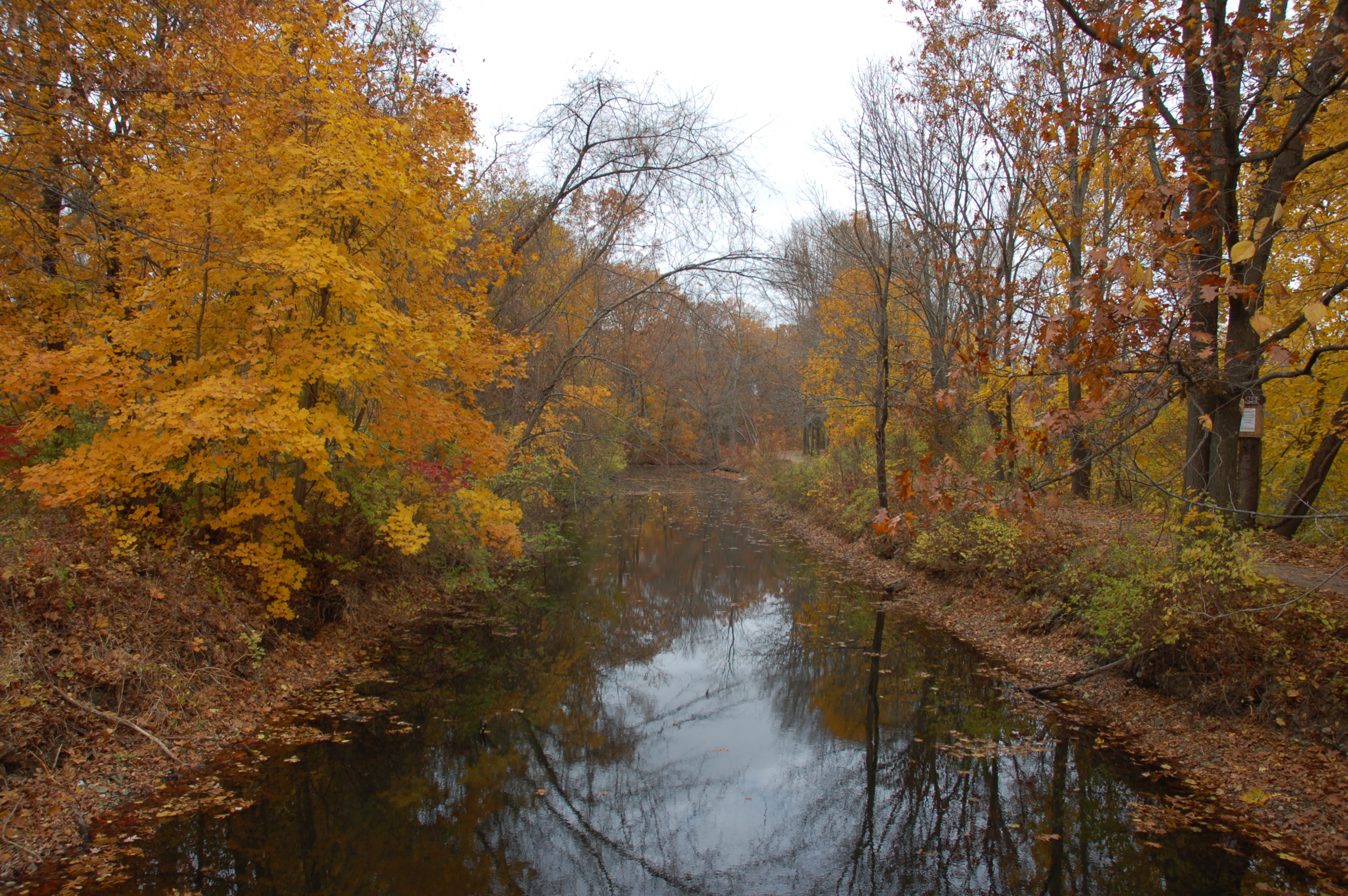
- A remaining section of canal in Uxbridge, Massachusetts
- Location: Providence, Rhode Island – Worcester, Massachusetts
- Built: 1825–1828
- NRHP reference No.: 71000030, 73000328, 91001536, 95001004
- Added to NRHP: May 6, 1971

The Blackstone Canal was a manmade waterway, linking Worcester, Massachusetts, to Providence, Rhode Island, and Narragansett Bay, through the Blackstone Valley, via a series of locks and canals in the early 19th century. Construction started in 1825, and the canal opened three years later. After the opening of the Boston and Providence Railroad (1835), the canal struggled for business. Its transportation role was taken over by the Providence and Worcester Railroad, which completed a parallel line in 1847. The canal shut down in 1848. Several segments of the canal are preserved, and the canal alignment and remains are on the National Register of Historic Places.

== History ==
Route of the Blackstone Canal

The initiative for the canal came from Providence, where a merchant community wished to profit from trade with the farming country of the Blackstone Valley and Worcester County. The people of Worcester and the Blackstone Valley, eager for transport that would enable them to get better prices for their produce, welcomed the plan. However, since the trade of central Massachusetts was at that time going overland through the port of Boston, Massachusetts commercial interests succeeded in stalling the project for several years. Finally, in 1823, the Blackstone Canal Company was organized through an act of the Massachusetts legislature, with a Rhode Island company soon following. The canal's construction may have been motivated by competition among rival industrialists to curtail "water rights".

Construction began in 1825 and cost $750,000 (twice its initial estimate). The canal opened on October 7, 1828, when the packet boat Lady Carrington arrived in Worcester, the first vessel to make the trip. The canal brought immediate prosperity to Worcester and the Valley; farmers' profits increased and mills were built, especially in Worcester. Using water to transport goods was a great improvement over the rough roads of the era. At the time of its construction, it represented the best available transportation technology.

It was a two-day trip for the canal boats from Worcester to Providence and another two-day trip to return to Worcester. The overnight stopping point was in Uxbridge. Boston merchants moved to recapture the trade moving down the canal to Providence, opening a rail line to Worcester in 1835. (Boston merchants opened three railroads in 1835, one to Lowell, one to Worcester, and one to Providence, RI. These were very new technology.) In 1847 the parallel Providence and Worcester Railroad began operation, and the canal closed in 1848.

The canal was 35 feet or more in width. It ascended 451 feet, passing through an original 49 locks. The canal used "slack-water" to bypass narrow valley areas and intersected the Blackstone River 16 times over its 45-mile course. It ran in the river itself for 10% of its length. These portions proved troublesome since in summer, water was sometimes too low for navigation. In other periods, flooding was the problem. Winter added ice to the issues.

Each lock was 70 feet long by 10 feet wide and apparently 4–4.5 feet deep. All, except the wooden tide lock at Providence, were built of granite on a wooden foundation. The average lift of each lock was 9.2 feet, but there were variations.

The canal was engineered by Benjamin Wright (chief engineer of the Erie Canal) and Holmes Hutchinson (later Chief Engineer of New York's canals) as they were concluding work on the original Erie Canal. Its locks are therefore similar, although smaller, than the original Erie's.

The canal followed the course of Mill Creek from the center of Worcester, MA to the southern part of that community. It then followed the Blackstone River downstream to Ashton, RI. At Ashton, it paralleled the river's west bank, maintaining elevation until it entered Cranberry and Scotts Ponds on the divide of the watershed with the Moshassuck River. It then locked down into the Moshassuck Valley and followed that stream into Providence, RI.

== The canal today ==
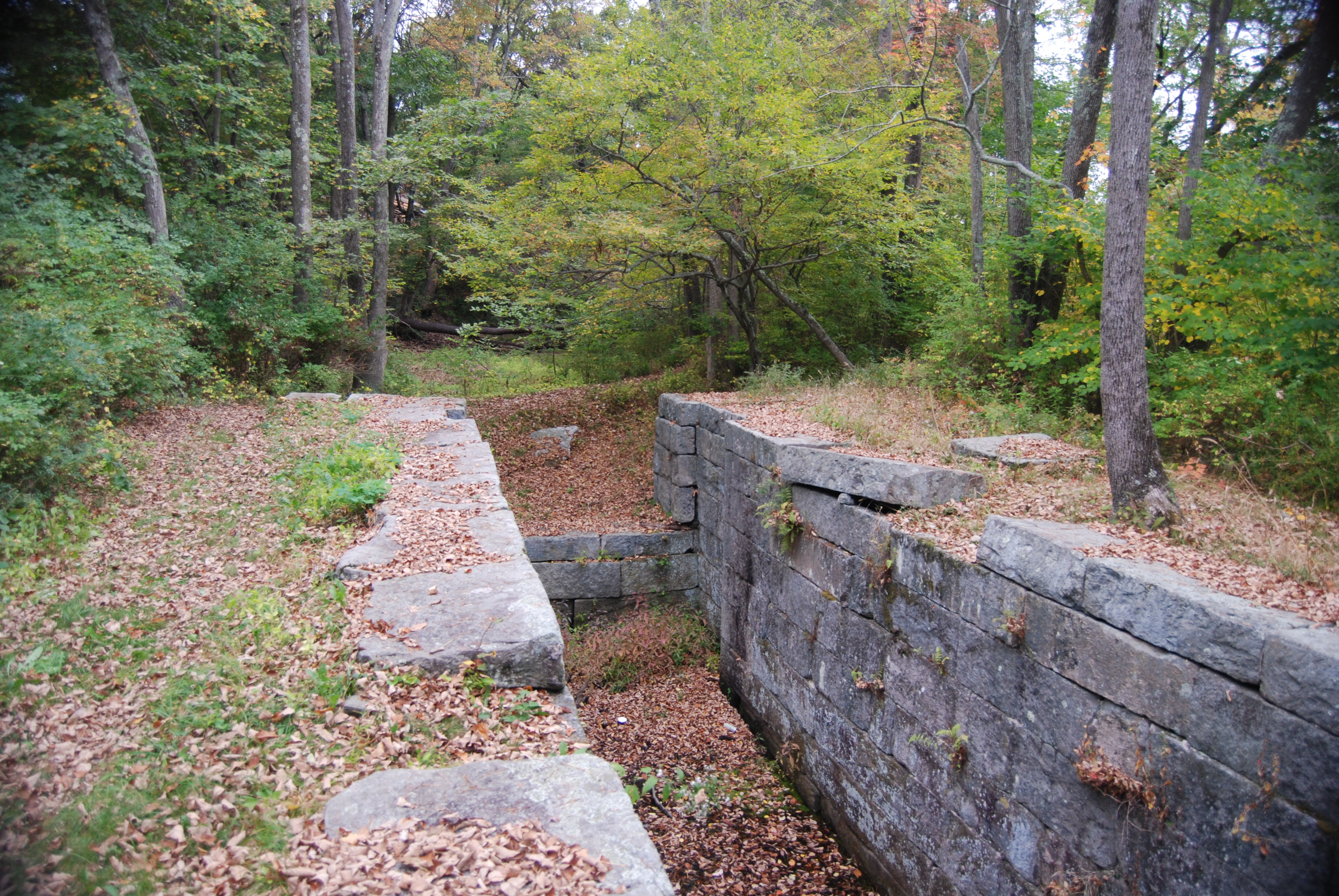
Remains of a lock in Millville, Massachusetts

Since the canal's closure, parts of its watercourse were filled and other segments are now heavily overgrown with brush and trees. Other sections were converted to hydraulic canals for textile mills. Much of the lock masonry was sold for other purposes. Its remains, however, are still visible in many locations. About 85% of the canal remains. Two long sections of the canal exist in the Blackstone River and Canal Heritage State Park in Massachusetts and the Blackstone River State Park in Rhode Island. Other sections are also publicly owned.

The canal is the subject of several listings on the National Register of Historic Places. The southernmost portion of the canal, between Providence and the Ashton Dam in Lincoln, Rhode Island, was listed in 1971; this list was expanded in 1991 to include the entire Rhode Island section. A 3.5 miles (5.6 km) section of the canal in Uxbridge and Northbridge, Massachusetts was listed in 1973; this listing was expanded in 1995 to encompass the entire historic footprint of the canal in Massachusetts. A section of the Blackstone River Bikeway in Lincoln, Rhode Island follows the original canal towpath with the river on one side of the riders and the canal on the other.

== Significance ==
The Blackstone Canal is historically significant as a transportation network arising from a canal-building frenzy of the early 19th-century. The canal played a key role in stimulating the industry between Providence and Worcester and the towns and villages along the Moshassuck and Blackstone Rivers. Though its useful service life was just twenty years long, the canal and the parks incorporating the canal are "visible and tangible parts of the city's and the state's history of growth, planning, commercial ambition and prosperity".

== See also ==
- Blackstone River Valley National Historical Park
- National Register of Historic Places listings in Providence, Rhode Island
- National Register of Historic Places listings in Providence County, Rhode Island
- National Register of Historic Places listings in Worcester, Massachusetts
- National Register of Historic Places listings in Worcester County, Massachusetts
