= National Register of Historic Places listings in Lincoln, Rhode Island =

This is a list of Registered Historic Places in Lincoln, Rhode Island.

Contents: Counties in Rhode Island

Bristol | Kent | Newport | Providence (Pawtucket | Providence (city) | Woonsocket) | Washington

This National Park Service list is complete through NPS recent listings posted April 17, 2026.

	Name on the Register	Image	Date listed	Location	City or town	Description
1	Albion Historic District	Albion Historic District	July 19, 1984 (#84001899)	Roughly bounded by Berkshire Dr., Willow Lane, Ledge Way, Kennedy Boulevard, and School and Main Sts. 41°57′06″N 71°27′26″W	Lincoln	
2	Eleazer Arnold House	Eleazer Arnold House	November 24, 1968 (#68000006)	Great Rd. (RI 123) near its junction with RI 126; 41°54′10″N 71°25′14″W	Lincoln	
3	Israel Arnold House	Israel Arnold House	December 18, 1970 (#70000017)	Great Rd. 41°54′17″N 71°25′35″W	Lincoln	
4	Ballou House	Ballou House	August 30, 1984 (#84001908)	Albion Rd. 41°56′48″N 71°28′21″W	Lincoln	
5	Blackstone Canal	Blackstone Canal	May 6, 1971 (#71000030)	From Steeple and Promenade Sts. in Providence to the Massachusetts border in North Smithfield; 41°55′16″N 71°25′21″W	Lincoln, Cumberland, Woonsocket, and North Smithfield	Initial listing extended from Providence, through Pawtucket, and as far north as Lincoln; a 1991 expansion (#91001536) extended it to the state line; the canal itself extended into Worcester County, Massachusetts, where it is the subject of separate listings.
6	Elliot-Harris-Miner House	Elliot-Harris-Miner House	August 30, 1984 (#84001984)	1406 Old Louisquisset Pike; 41°52′43″N 71°26′11″W	Lincoln	
7	Great Road Historic District	Great Road Historic District	July 22, 1974 (#74000051)	Great Rd. 41°54′21″N 71°25′41″W	Lincoln	
8	Hearthside	Hearthside	April 24, 1973 (#73000069)	Great Rd. 41°54′23″N 71°25′50″W	Lincoln	
9	Jenckes House	Jenckes House	August 30, 1984 (#84002019)	81 Jenckes Hill Rd. 41°54′16″N 71°27′32″W	Lincoln	
10	Jenckes House	Jenckes House	October 10, 1984 (#84000088)	1730 Old Louisquisset Pike; 41°53′44″N 71°26′55″W	Lincoln	
11	Lime Kilns	Lime Kilns	August 30, 1984 (#84002015)	Off Louisquisset Pike, Sherman and Dexter Rock Rds.	Lincoln	Ruined remnants of three colonia-era lime kilns at different locations.
12	Limerock Village Historic District	Limerock Village Historic District	May 23, 1974 (#74000052)	In an irregular pattern along Smith, Wilbur, and Great Rds., and Old Louisquisset Pike; 41°55′40″N 71°27′22″W	Lincoln	
13	Lonsdale Historic District	Lonsdale Historic District	May 25, 1984 (#84002022)	Lonsdale Ave., Blackstone Ct., and Front, Main, Cook, Broad, Mill, Cross and Blackstone Sts. 41°54′34″N 71°24′11″W	Cumberland and Lincoln	
14	Manville Company Worker Housing Historic District	Manville Company Worker Housing Historic District	April 2, 2009 (#08001183)	Bounded by Chestnut St., Angle St., Railroad St., Winter St., Fall St., Spring St., Park Way, Almeida Dr., and Main St. 41°58′13″N 71°28′18″W	Lincoln	
15	Old Ashton Historic District	Old Ashton Historic District	August 30, 1984 (#84002037)	Lower River Rd. and Blackstone Canal Towpath; 41°56′11″N 71°26′04″W	Lincoln	Now a site on the Blackstone River Bikeway State Park
16	Pullen Corner School	Pullen Corner School	August 30, 1984 (#84002039)	Angell and Whipple; 41°53′44″N 71°28′06″W	Lincoln	
17	Sassafras Site, RI-55	Sassafras Site, RI-55	November 1, 1984 (#84000360)	Between Albion Rd. and the Blackstone River; 41°57′08″N 71°27′03″W	Lincoln	
18	Saylesville Historic District	Saylesville Historic District	August 30, 1984 (#84002049)	Roughly bounded by Memorial Ave., Scotts Road, Industrial Circle, Smithfield Ave., and Woodland Court; 41°53′33″N 71°24′37″W	Lincoln	
19	Saylesville Meetinghouse	Saylesville Meetinghouse	November 28, 1978 (#78000008)	Smithfield Ave. 41°54′02″N 71°25′06″W	Lincoln	
20	Whipple-Cullen House and Barn	Whipple-Cullen House and Barn	November 14, 1991 (#91001647)	Old River Rd. south of its junction with George Washington Highway; 41°55′49″N 71°26′31″W	Lincoln	

== See also ==
- National Register of Historic Places listings in Providence County, Rhode Island
- List of National Historic Landmarks in Rhode Island
