= Blackstone Valley =

Region of Massachusetts & Rhode Island in the United States

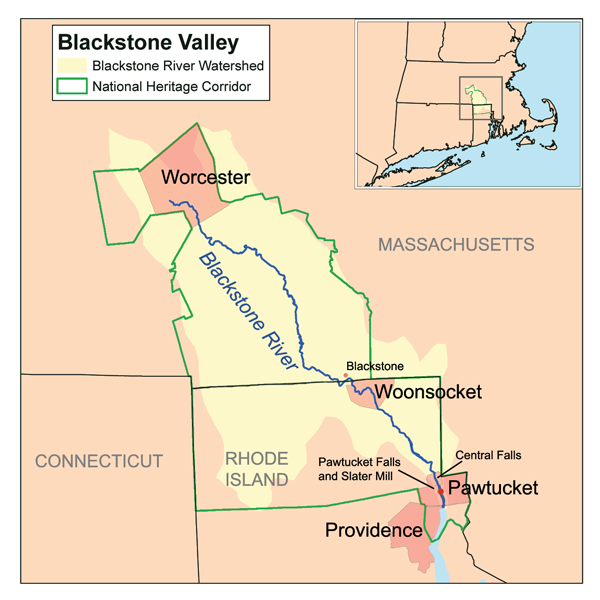
- The Blackstone Valley in Massachusetts and Rhode Island
- Long-axis direction: Northwest-Southeast

Geology
- Type: River valley

Geography
- Location: United States
- Population centers: Worcester, Massachusetts, Providence, Rhode Island
- Rivers: Blackstone River

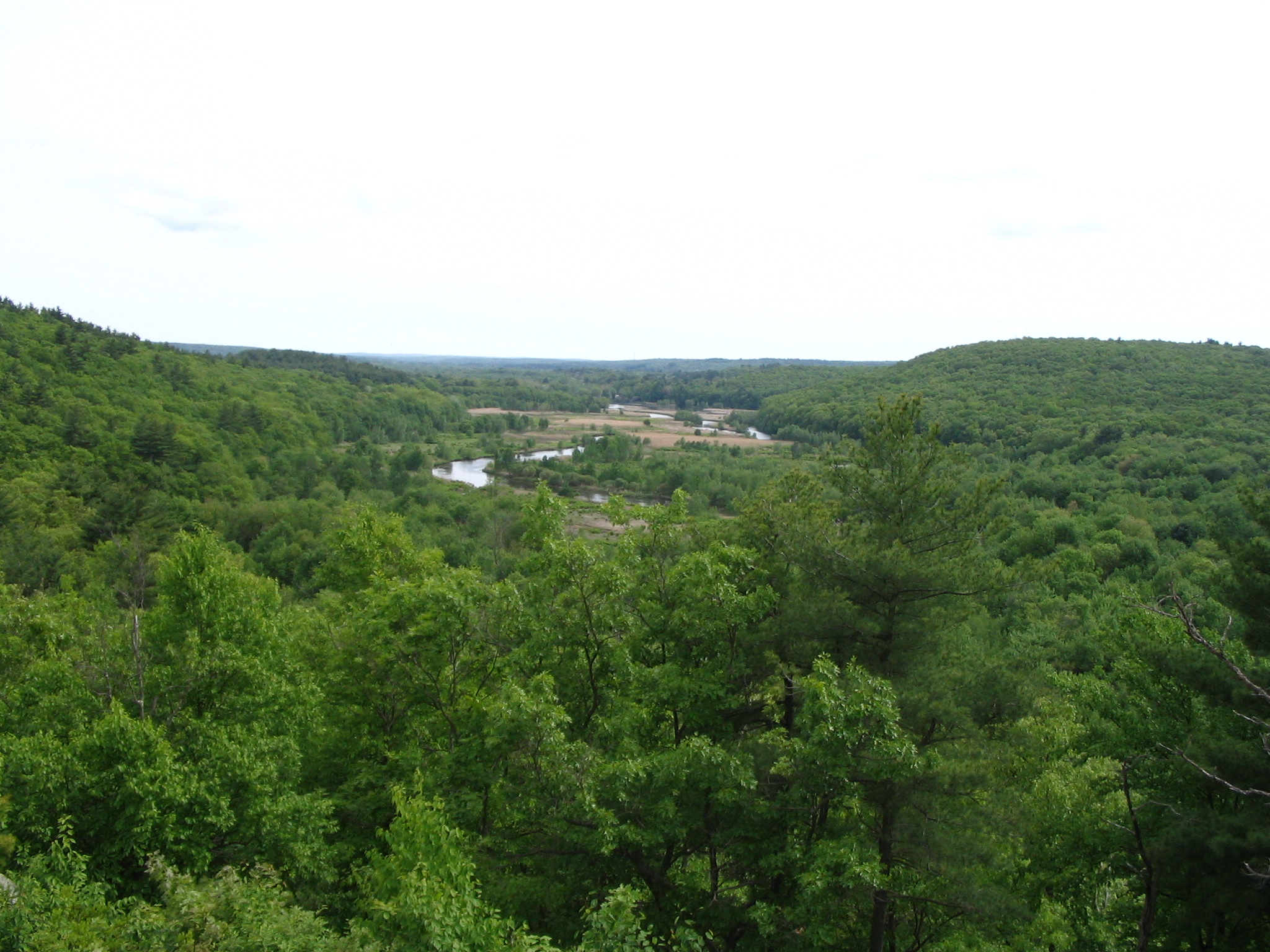
A typical summer view in the Blackstone Valley near Uxbridge, Massachusetts

The Blackstone Valley or Blackstone River Valley is a region of Massachusetts and Rhode Island. It was a major factor in the American Industrial Revolution. It makes up part of the Blackstone River Valley National Heritage Corridor and National Historical Park.

== History ==
=== National Heritage Corridor ===
The John H. Chafee Blackstone River Valley National Heritage Corridor follows the Blackstone Valley from Worcester to Providence, Rhode Island. The corridor follows the course of the Industrial Revolution in America from its origin at the Slater Mill in Pawtucket, Rhode Island as it first spread north along the valley to Worcester, Massachusetts, and then to the rest of the nation.

The region was designated a National Heritage Corridor by Congress in November 1986, composing 25 towns and cities throughout Massachusetts and Rhode Island.

=== National Historical Park ===
In 2011, a report recommended the region for National Park status. In 2014, the Blackstone River Valley National Historical Park was established.

== Geography ==
=== Blackstone River ===
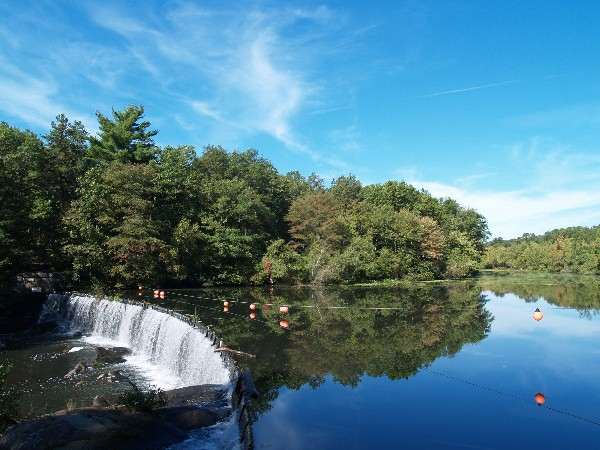
The Blackstone River at the Blackstone River and Canal Heritage State Park, near Massachusetts–Rhode Island state line

The river is named after William Blackstone (original spelling William Blaxton) who arrived in Weymouth, Massachusetts in 1623, and became the first European settler of present-day Boston in 1625. He relocated again, to Rhode Island in 1635 and built his home on the river, in what would become Cumberland. With the Providence River, the Blackstone was the northeastern border of Dutch claims for New Netherland from Adriaen Block's charting of Narragansett Bay in 1614 through the Hartford Treaty of 1650.

The original Native American name for the river was the "Kittacuck", which meant "the great tidal river". The "Kittacuck", or Blackstone, was plentiful with salmon and lamprey in pre-colonial and colonial times.

In 1790, Samuel Slater opened the first successful water powered cotton mill in America, Slater Mill, at Pawtucket Falls. This mill was powered by the waters of the Blackstone River. Many other mills appeared along the Blackstone River over time making it an important part of American industry. The industrialization also led to the river being identified by the end of the 20th century as the primary source of Narragansett Bay pollution.

=== Blackstone Canal ===
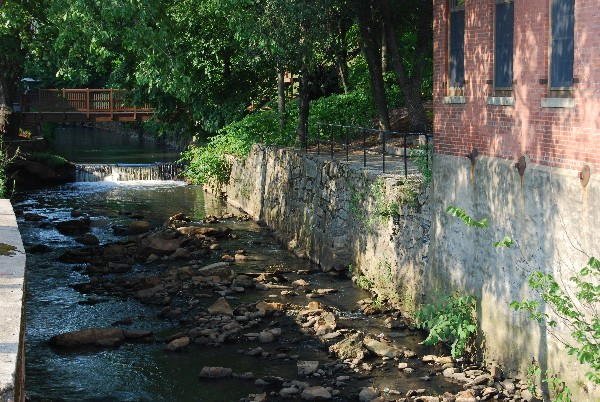
The Blackstone Canal in Providence

The initiative for the canal came from Providence, where a merchant community wished to profit from trade with the farming country of the Blackstone Valley and Worcester County. The people of Worcester and the Blackstone Valley, eager for transport that would enable them to get better prices for their produce, welcomed the plan. However, since the trade of central Massachusetts was at that time going overland through the port of Boston, Massachusetts commercial interests succeeded in stalling the project for several years. Finally, in 1823, the Blackstone Canal Company was organized through an act of the Massachusetts legislature, with a Rhode Island company soon following. The canal's construction may have been motivated by competition among rival industrialists to curtail "water rights".

Construction began in 1825 and cost $750,000 (twice its initial estimate). The canal opened on October 7, 1828, when the packet boat Lady Carrington arrived in Worcester, the first vessel to make the trip. The canal brought immediate prosperity to Worcester and the Valley; farmers' profits increased and mills were built, especially in Worcester. Using water to transport goods was a great improvement over the rough roads of the era. At the time of its construction, it represented the best available transportation technology.

It was a two-day trip for the canal boats from Worcester to Providence and another two-day trip to return to Worcester. The overnight stopping point was in Uxbridge. Boston merchants moved to recapture the trade moving down the canal to Providence, opening a rail line to Worcester in 1835. (Boston merchants opened three railroads in 1835, one to Lowell, one to Worcester, and one to Providence, RI. These were very new technology.) In 1847 the parallel Providence and Worcester Railroad began operation, and the canal closed in 1848.

The canal is listed in the National Register of Historic Places.

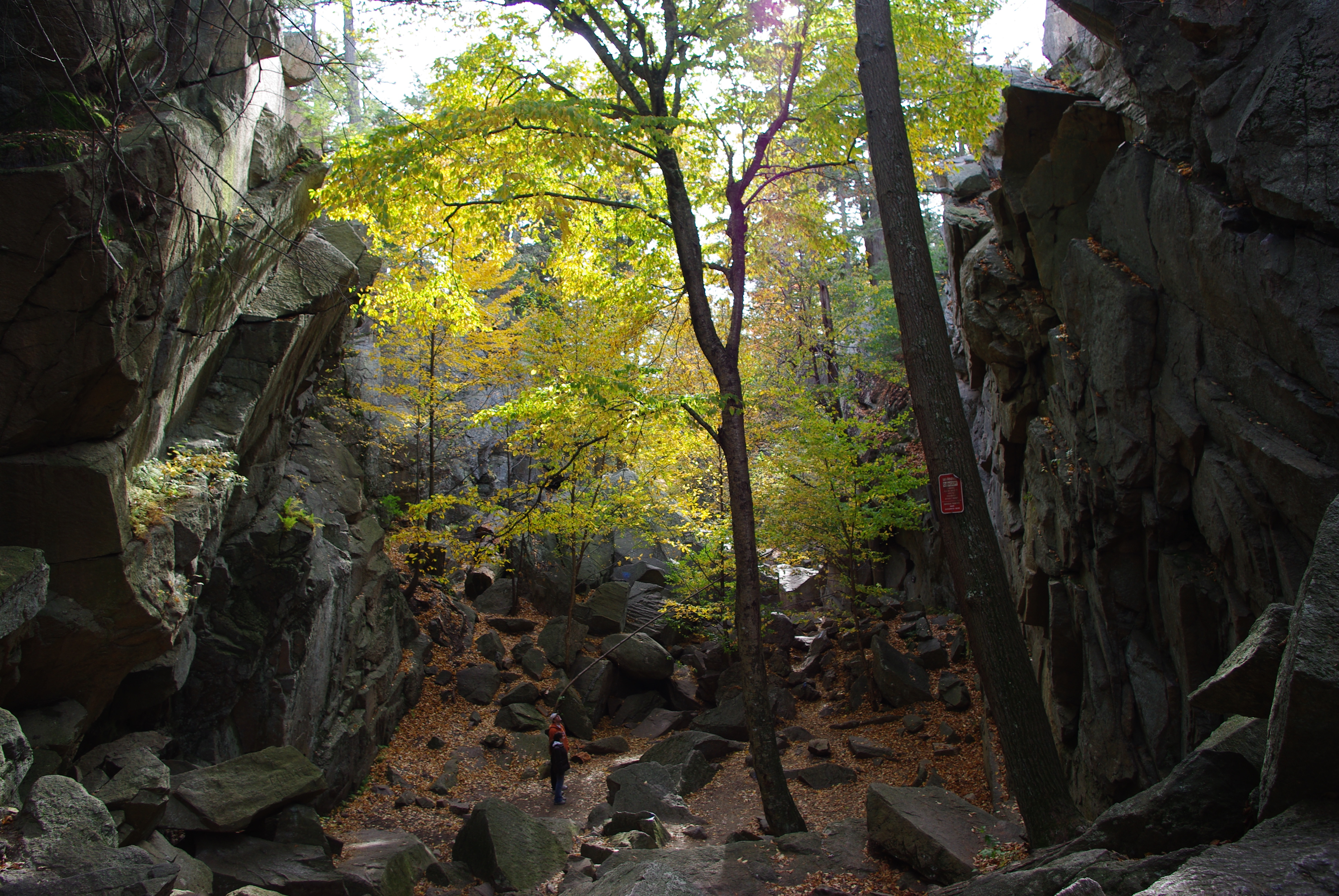
Purgatory Chasm

=== Recreation ===
The Blackstone Valley offers multiple recreation areas for visitors, including:

- Blackstone River and Canal Heritage State Park in Northbridge and Uxbridge
- Douglas State Forest in Douglas
- Lincoln Woods State Park in Lincoln
- Purgatory Chasm State Reservation in Sutton
- Upton State Forest in Upton

== Transportation ==
Multiple modes of transportation are available that serve the Blackstone Valley.

=== Roads ===
Two major roads travel through the region. Route 122 in Massachusetts is known as the Blackstone Canal Heritage Highway. The road travels through many of the region's mill villages. The other major road is Route 146 in Massachusetts and Rhode Island. Upgrades on the Massachusetts side have seen major economic benefits throughout the towns.

=== Rail ===
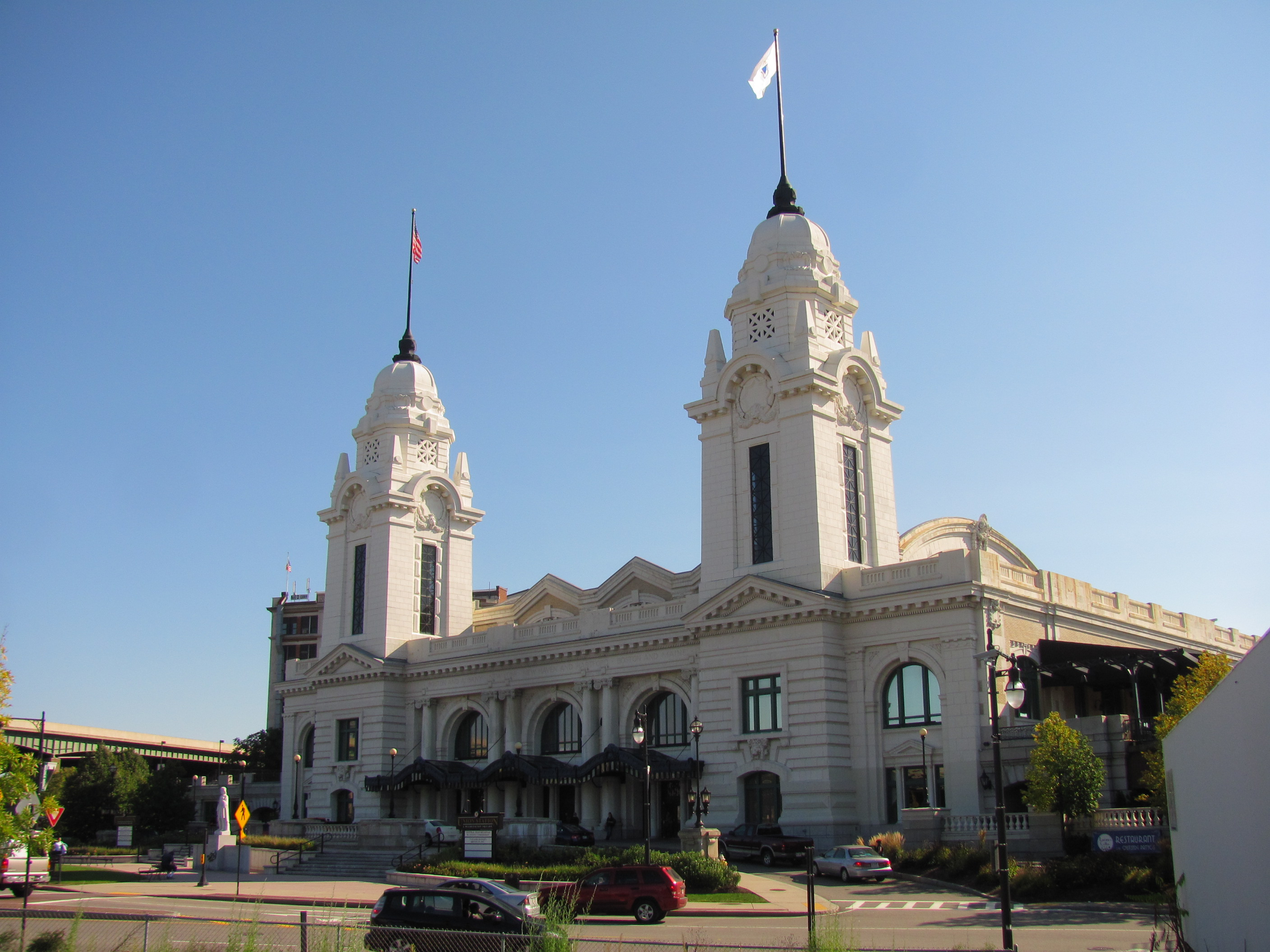
Union Station in Worcester

Two MBTA Commuter Rail lines, the Worcester and Providence Lines have stations located within the Blackstone Valley. Both lines provide direct service to Boston's South Station. Providence station is also served by Amtrak trains on the Northeast Corridor, providing service to New York City and beyond.

== Demographics ==
At the 2010 United States census, the population of the Blackstone Valley was 848,725.

Blackstone Valley population
Town	Population (2020)
Auburn	16,889
Blackstone	9,208
Burrillville	16,158
Central Falls	22,583
Cumberland	36,405
Douglas	8,983
East Providence	47,139
Glocester	9,974
Grafton	19,664
Hopedale	6,017
Leicester	11,087
Lincoln	22,529
Mendon	6,228
Millbury	13,831
Millville	3,174
Northbridge	16,335
North Smithfield	12,588
Pawtucket	75,604
Providence	190,934
Smithfield	22,118
Sutton	9,357
Upton	8,000
Uxbridge	14,162
Woonsocket	43,240
Worcester	206,518
Total	848,725

== See also ==
- Greater Worcester Land Trust and list of other conservation organizations operating in the Blackstone River Valley
- 1922 New England Textile Strike
