= List of bridges documented by the Historic American Engineering Record in Rhode Island =

This is a list of bridges documented by the Historic American Engineering Record in the U.S. state of Rhode Island.

== Bridges ==
Survey No.	Name (as assigned by HAER)	Status	Type	Built	Documented	Carries	Crosses	Location	County	Coordinates
RI-14	Union Station Viaduct	Demolished	Viaduct	1893	1977	New York, New Haven and Hartford Railroad (former)	Woonasquatucket River	Providence	Providence	
RI-17	Exchange Bridge	Demolished	Steel built-up girder	1896	1984		Providence River	Providence	Providence	
RI-21	Albion Bridge	Extant	Pratt truss		1988	School Street	Blackstone River	Cumberland and Lincoln	Providence	41°57′11″N 71°27′08″W
RI-22	Albion Trench Bridge	Extant	Pratt truss		1988	School Street	Albion Mill Race	Lincoln	Providence	41°57′09″N 71°27′12″W
RI-25	Stillwater Road Bridge	Demolished	Lenticular truss	1886	1989	Stillwater Road	Woonasquatucket River	Smithfield	Providence	41°53′22″N 71°30′20″W
RI-28	Woonasquatucket Bridge	Demolished	Warren truss	1893	1983		Woonasquatucket River	Providence	Providence	
RI-30	Promenade Street Bridge	Demolished	Steel built-up girder	1894	1983	Providence and Worcester Railroad (former)	Woonasquatucket and Moshassuck rivers	Providence	Providence	
RI-31	Post Office Covered Walkway	Demolished	Reinforced concrete girder		1983			Providence	Providence	
RI-32	Gaspee Street Bridge	Demolished	Steel built-up girder	1894	1983	New York, New Haven and Hartford Railroad (former)	Gaspee Street	Providence	Providence	
RI-33	Francis Street Bridge	Demolished	Steel built-up girder	1894	1983	New York, New Haven and Hartford Railroad (former)	Francis Street	Providence	Providence	
RI-34	Charles Street Bridge	Replaced	Steel built-up girder	1894	1991	Route 246 (Charles Street)	West River	Providence	Providence	41°53′22″N 71°30′20″W
RI-39	White Rock Bridge	Replaced	Pratt truss	1906	1994	Bridge Road	Pawcatuck River and White Rock Canal	Westerly	Washington	41°23′51″N 71°50′32″W
RI-40	Warren Bridge	Replaced	Reinforced concrete Luten arch	1916	1994	Route 114	Palmer River	Warren	Bristol	41°44′15″N 71°17′22″W
RI-41	Barrington Bridge	Replaced	Reinforced concrete Luten arch	1916	1994	Route 114	Barrington River	Barrington	Bristol	41°44′12″N 71°17′44″W
RI-42	New Shoreham Bridge	Replaced	Reinforced concrete T-beam	1917	1996	Beach Avenue	Harbor Pond	New Shoreham	Washington	41°10′44″N 71°33′59″W
RI-43	Ashton Viaduct	Replaced	Reinforced concrete open-spandrel arch	1945	1996	Route 116 (George Washington Highway)	Blackstone River	Ashton and Lincoln	Providence	41°56′18″N 71°26′03″W
RI-44	Pawtuxet River Railroad Bridge	Altered	Warren truss	1906	1996	New York, New Haven and Hartford Railroad (former)	Pawtuxet River and Wellington Avenue	Cranston and Warwick	Providence and Kent	41°45′39″N 71°25′48″W
RI-45	Court Street Bridge	Replaced	Pratt truss	1895	1996	Route 104 (Court Street)	Blackstone River and Truman Drive	Woonsocket	Providence	42°00′09″N 71°30′43″W
RI-46	West Street Bridge	Demolished	Pratt truss	1913		West Street	New York, New Haven and Hartford Railroad (former)	Westerly	Washington	41°22′58″N 71°49′36″W
RI-47	Main Street Bridge	Replaced	Steel built-up girder	1936	1996	Route 138 (Main Street)	New York, New Haven and Hartford Railroad (former)	West Kingston	Washington	41°29′05″N 71°33′36″W
RI-48	Hunt River Road Bridge	Replaced	Steel built-up girder	1930	1996	US 1 (Post Road)	New York, New Haven and Hartford Railroad (former)	North Kingstown	Washington	41°37′54″N 71°27′56″W
RI-49	Greenwood Railroad Bridge	Replaced	Reinforced concrete T-beam	1930	1996	US 1 (Post Road) / Route 113 (Main Avenue)	New York, New Haven and Hartford Railroad (former)	Warwick	Kent	41°42′41″N 71°26′53″W
RI-50	Adelaide Avenue Pedestrian Bridge	Demolished	Steel built-up girder	1903	1996	Adelaide Avenue	New York, New Haven and Hartford Railroad (former)	Providence	Providence	41°47′44″N 71°25′36″W
RI-51	Central Street Pedestrian Viaduct	Demolished	Steel built-up girder	1903	1996	Central Street	New York, New Haven and Hartford Railroad (former)	Central Falls	Providence	41°53′10″N 71°23′07″W
RI-52	Blackstone River Railroad Bridge	Extant	Steel built-up girder	1897	1996	New York, New Haven and Hartford Railroad (former)	Blackstone River and Branch Street	Pawtucket	Providence	41°53′34″N 71°22′54″W
RI-53	Woonasquatucket River Bridge	Replaced	Reinforced concrete closed-spandrel arch	1919	1997	Route 104 (Farnum Pike)	Woonasquatucket River	Smithfield	Providence	41°54′31″N 71°32′27″W
RI-54	India Point Railroad Bridge	Demolished	Swing span	1903	1997	Boston and Providence Railroad (former)	Seekonk River	Providence and East Providence	Providence	41°49′02″N 71°23′15″W

== See also ==
- List of bridges on the National Register of Historic Places in Rhode Island
