= Great Road =

Great Road or The Great Road may refer to:

- Great Road (Roman Britain), another name for the part of Pye Road between Londinium (London) and Camulodunum (Colchester) in Roman Britain
- Great Road (New England), a historic road from Rhode Island to Connecticut in the United States
  - Great Road Historic District in Lincoln, Rhode Island, commemorating the former road
- Great Wagon Road, a historic road from Pennsylvania to North Carolina in the United States
- Great Road (Appalachia), another name for the Wilderness Road across the Appalachians through the Cumberland Gap in the United States

== See also ==
- Great East Road in Zambia
