= Pawtucket Falls =

Pawtucket Falls can refer to a location in the United States:

- Pawtucket Falls (Massachusetts), a waterfall along the Merrimack River in Lowell, Massachusetts
- Pawtucket Falls (Rhode Island), a waterfall along the Blackstone River in Pawtucket, Rhode Island
