= Manville Company Worker Housing Historic District =

Historic district in Rhode Island, United States

- U.S. National Register of Historic Places
- U.S. Historic district
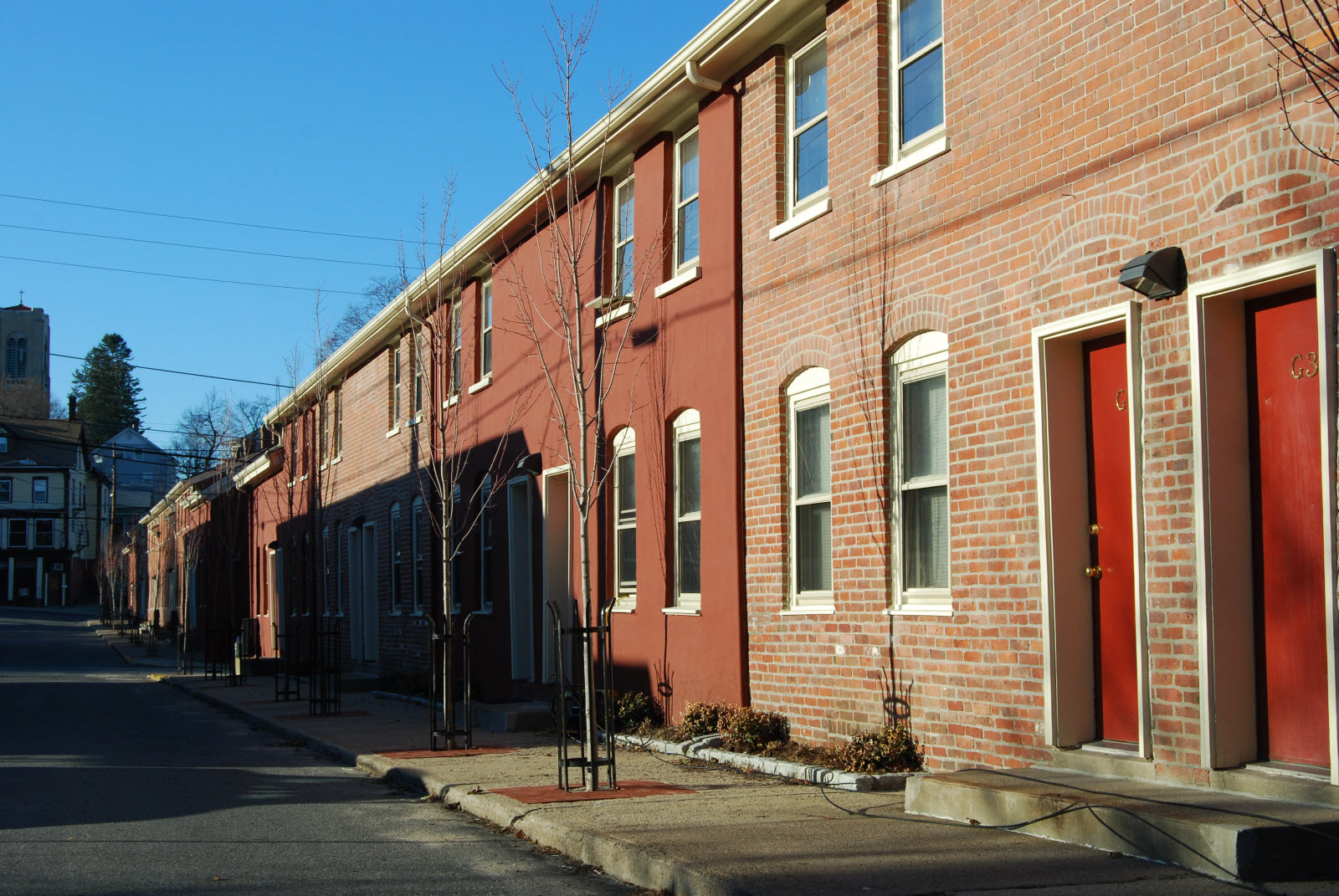

- Location within Rhode Island Location within the United States
- Location: Bounded by Chestnut St., Angle St., Railroad St., Winter St., Fall St., Spring St., Park Way, Almeida Dr., Main St., Lincoln, Rhode Island
- Coordinates: 41.97016°N 71.47151°W
- Area: 50 acres (20 ha)
- Built: 1812
- Architectural style: Greek Revival, 19th-century vernacular
- NRHP reference No.: 08001183
- Added to NRHP: April 2, 2009

The Manville Company Worker Housing Historic District is a residential historic district encompassing an area of mill worker housing in the Manville village of Lincoln, Rhode Island. The district covers about 50 acres (20 ha) of the village, including properties on Angle, Main, Old Main, Spring, Summer, Winter, and Chestnut Streets, as well as several properties on adjoining roads, describing a crescent, part of which abuts the south bank of the Blackstone River. The housing in this district was built between about 1812 and 1890 by the various proprietors of the Manville Company, and feature a diversity of architectural styles, most of which are simple vernacular interpretations of styles popular at the time. Most of the houses are either 1-1/2 or 2-1/2 stories in height, with one or two units per structure, and are set on small lots. There are also a series of brick rowhouses, a relative rarity in Rhode Island mill housing of the period.

The district was listed on the National Register of Historic Places in 2009.

== See also ==
- National Register of Historic Places listings in Providence County, Rhode Island
