= Sassafras Site, RI-55 =

- U.S. National Register of Historic Places
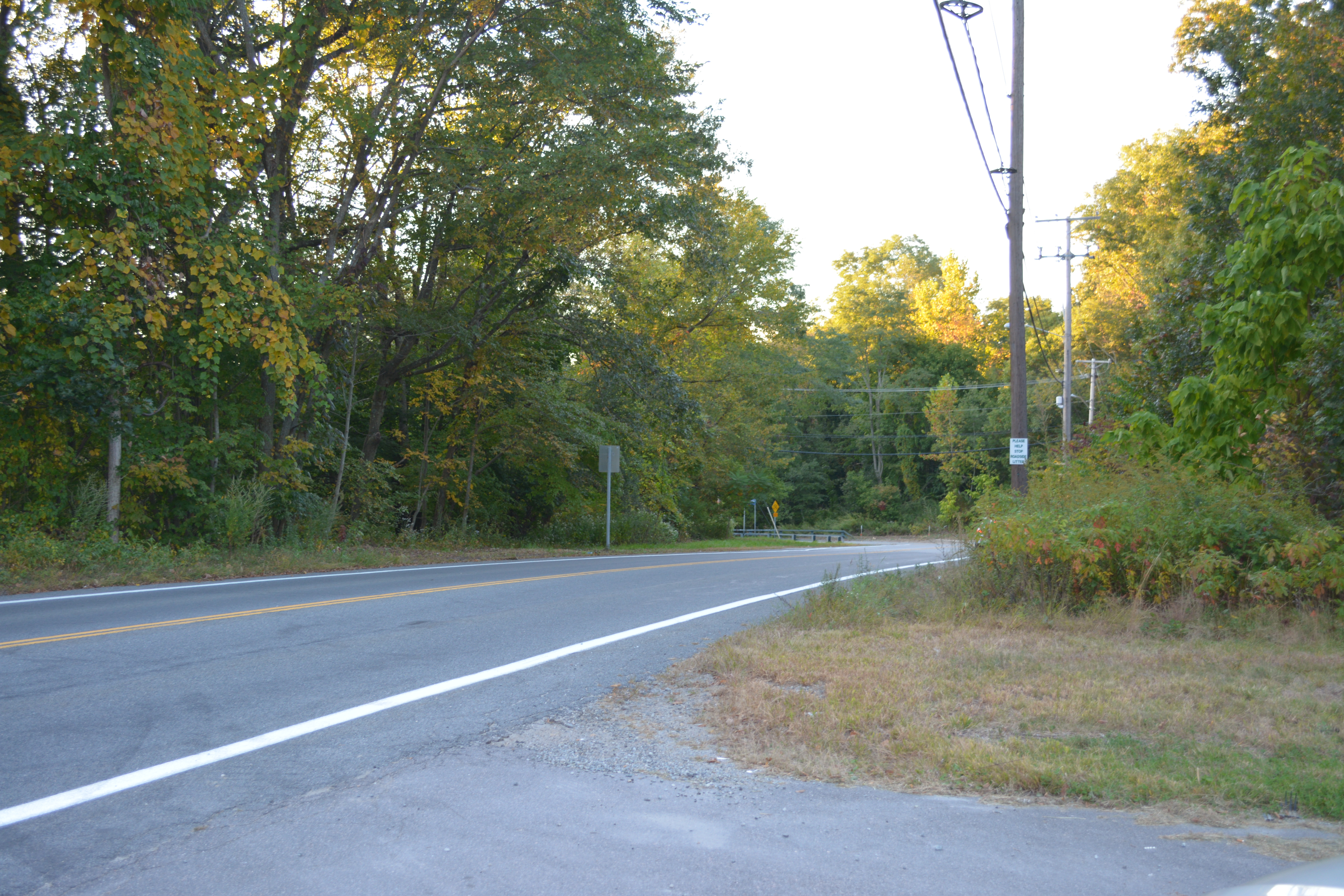
- Nearest city: Albion, Rhode Island
- NRHP reference No.: 84000360
- Added to NRHP: November 1, 1984

The Sassafras Site, designated RI-55, is a prehistoric archaeological site in Albion, a village of Lincoln, Rhode Island. The site was discovered by archaeologists while surveying an area for a potential replacement for the Albion Street bridge, which spans the Blackstone River between Lincoln and Cumberland. The site encompasses a regionally significant quartz stone tool workshop.

The site was listed on the National Register of Historic Places in 1984.

== See also ==
- National Register of Historic Places listings in Providence County, Rhode Island
