= Hopedale Village Historic District =

Historic district in Massachusetts, United States

- U.S. National Register of Historic Places
- U.S. Historic district
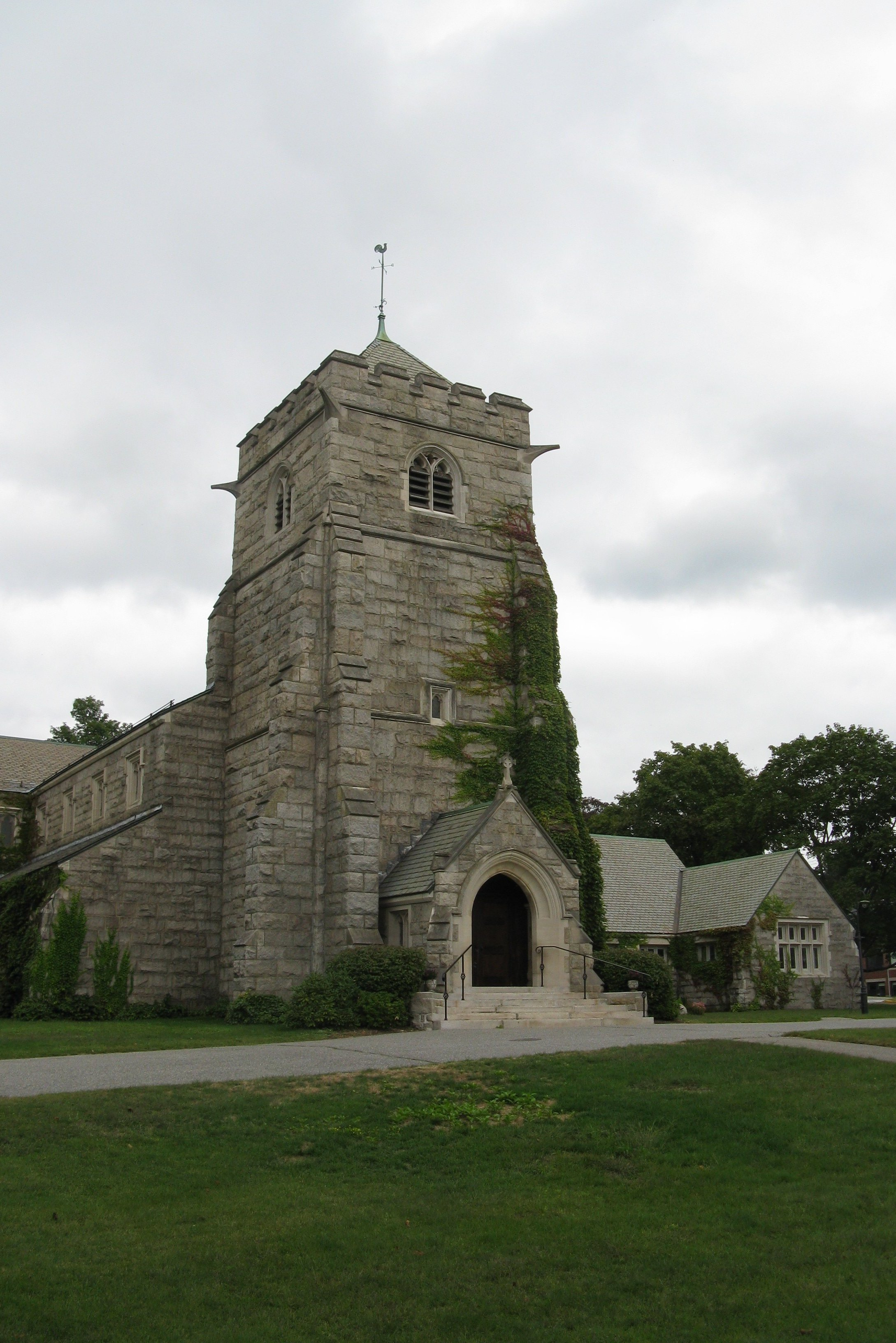
- Hopedale Unitarian Parish

- Location within Massachusetts Location within the United States
- Location: Hopedale, Massachusetts
- Coordinates: 42°7′49″N 71°32′12″W
- Area: 804 acres (325 ha)
- Built: 1856
- Architect: Cook, Robert Allen; Manning, Warren Harvey
- Architectural style: Colonial Revival, Tudor Revival
- NRHP reference No.: 02000635
- Added to NRHP: June 12, 2002

The Hopedale Village Historic District encompasses much of the historic 19th century industrial village center of Hopedale, Massachusetts. Its main focus is the mill complex of the Draper Company at Hopedale and Freedom Streets; the district includes much of northern Hopedale, extending along Dutcher and Freedom Streets, and including the mill pond. It extends to the south just beyond Mendon Street, including properties on that street from the Milford line west to Hopedale Cemetery. The district was added to the National Register of Historic Places in 2002. The district has been included as part of the Blackstone River Valley National Historical Park.

== See also ==
- National Register of Historic Places listings in Worcester County, Massachusetts
