= Saylesville Meetinghouse =

Historic church in Rhode Island, United States

- U.S. National Register of Historic Places
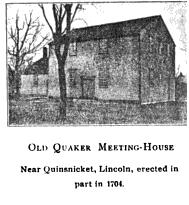
- Saylesville Meetinghouse, ca. 1900

- Location within Rhode Island Location within the United States
- Location: Lincoln, Rhode Island
- Coordinates: 41°54′2″N 71°25′6″W
- Area: 3 acres (1.2 ha)
- Built: 1704
- NRHP reference No.: 78000008
- Added to NRHP: November 28, 1978

The Saylesville Friends Meetinghouse is an historic Quaker meetinghouse located at 374 Great Road within the village of Saylesville in the town of Lincoln, Rhode Island.

The Quaker (Society of Friends) meetinghouse was built in 1703–04, consisting of a modest, nearly rectangular wood-frame structure. An expansion to the building was added c. 1745, joining a larger two-story structure to the old one.

Moses Brown and Samuel Slater, credited with founding Slater Mill, often described as the start of the American Industrial Revolution, were members either of Providence Friends Meeting, Saylesville Friends Meeting or Smithfield Friends Meeting House, Parsonage and Cemetery—sources are unclear. Providence Meeting is most likely because of its proximity to Moses Brown's farm, but Slater Mill is also reasonably close to the Saylesville Meetinghouse.

Stephen Hopkins, a signer of the Declaration of Independence, was married to Anna Smith in this meetinghouse in 1755. Elizabeth Buffum Chace, member from 1836 to 1841, prominent Quaker abolitionist and possible Underground Railroad station master, lived in nearby Central Falls.

== Architecture ==
The meetinghouse was built of medieval construction techniques, as Rhode Island was somewhat behind European civilization at the time. The newer two-story eastern section's hand-cut eight inch beams may have been re-purposed from a barn. The newer section was designed so that any parishioner speaking on the floor of the meetinghouse could be heard by people in the second floor balcony sections.

The western section features irregularly sized hand cut floor boards.

Saylesville Friends Meeting was founded by religious refugees who came to live at the very edge of the British empire. The meetinghouse's architecture is uniformly plain, with nothing ornate, in keeping with a Quaker dislike of religious ostentation. Quaker unprogrammed worship has no pastor and anyone may be moved to speak. For this reason the meeting room's benches are placed in roughly a square arrangement. However, it was expected that certain elders of the meeting were likely to speak more often, and so two benches were built on the north wall, known as the facing bench and the back bench. All three balconies have a reasonable view of the facing bench and the back bench. In later years the three balconies were enclosed and turned into First Day (Sunday) school rooms.

Friends in the 18th century believed in separate but ostensibly equal business meetings for men and for women, followed by a combined business meeting for finalizing the meeting minutes. The meetinghouse was designed with panels that swung up onto specially designed iron hooks, in order to combine the two business meetings as needed.

On the east edge of the property is an ancient stone platform designed so that a person could walk up a ramp while leading a horse, then mount the horse easily.

The meetinghouse was added to the National Register of Historic Places in 1978. It is one of the oldest surviving Quaker meeting houses in New England.

The meetinghouse continues to be used each First Day at 10:30 a.m. as a Friends Meetinghouse, in the unprogrammed tradition of Friends' worship. The Saylesville worship group is part of Providence Monthly Meeting of Friends.

The 1755 wedding certificate of Stephen Hopkins, signer of the Declaration of Independence

In 2017 the meetinghouse was used by an outside group for a 19th-century-themed marriage re-commitment ceremony. The meetinghouse has been used for several annual Rhode Island Sacred Harp sings. For the past several decades, the meetinghouse has held an annual candlelight meeting for worship on December 24 at 4:30 p.m.

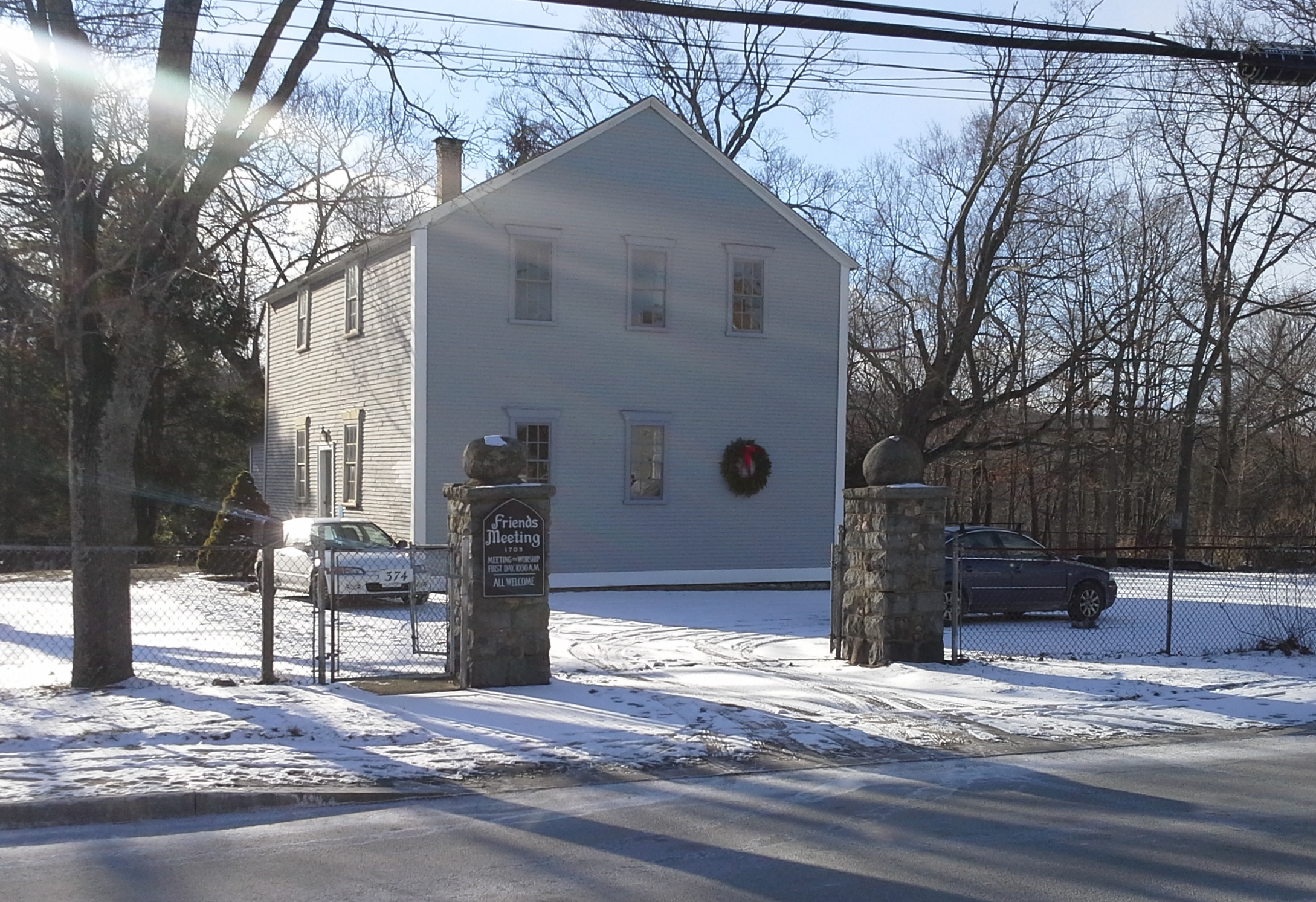
Saylesville Friends (Quaker) Meetinghouse in Lincoln, Rhode Island

== See also ==
- List of the oldest buildings in Rhode Island
- National Register of Historic Places listings in Providence County, Rhode Island
- Saylesville Historic District, encompassing part of the mill village it stands outside of
- Great Road Historic District, district of colonial and 19th-century homes to the north
