= Upton State Forest =

Protected area in Massachusetts, United States

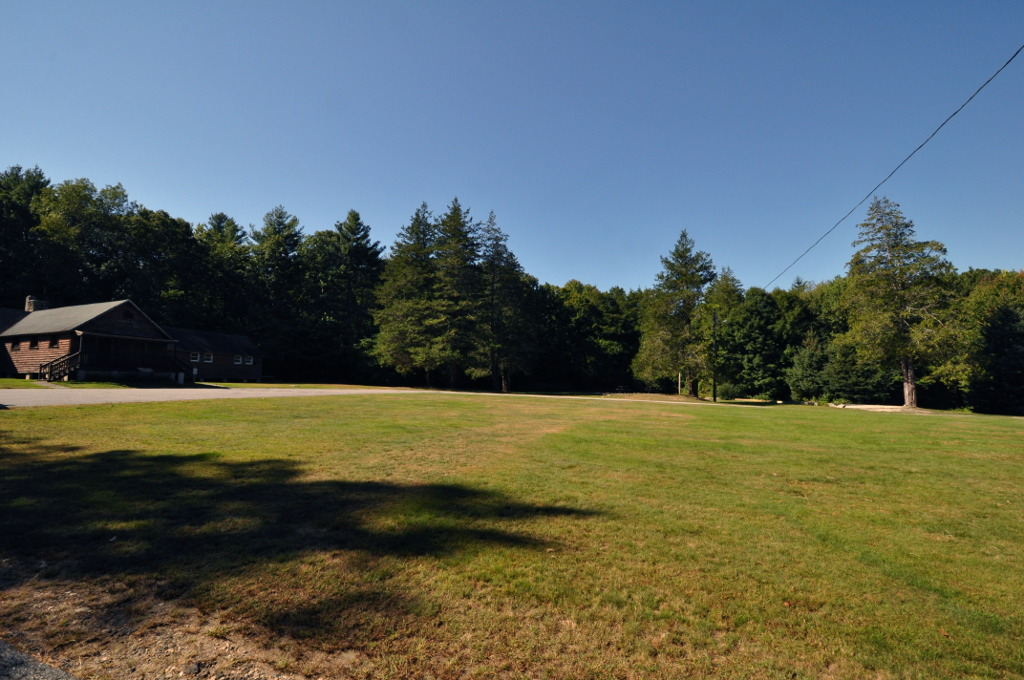
- Parade ground of the former CCC camp area

- Location within Massachusetts Location within the United States
- Location: Upton, Hopkinton and Westborough, Massachusetts, United States
- Coordinates: 42°11′40″N 71°35′45″W
- Area: 2,790 acres (1,130 ha)
- Elevation: 331 ft (101 m)
- Established: 1915
- Administrator: Massachusetts Department of Conservation and Recreation
- Website: Official website

Upton State Forest is a publicly owned forest with recreational features primarily located in the town of Upton, Massachusetts, with smaller sections in the towns of Hopkinton and Westborough. The state forest encompasses nearly 2,800 acres (1,100 ha) of publicly accessible lands and includes the last remaining Civilian Conservation Corps (CCC) camp in Massachusetts, built in Rustic style. The CCC campground was listed on the National Register of Historic Places in 2014.

== History ==
=== Early history ===
The area is within a short distance of the Old Connecticut Path and the Blackstone River, areas that were heavily traversed by local Nipmuc Native Americans.

There are numerous cellar holes and stone walls within the forest that indicate early colonial settlement as early as the 17th century, which is consistent with records of settlement within Mendon, Grafton, and Westborough.

A map from 1851 shows a sawmill at the southern end of Dean Pond. It was washed out in a flood in 1882, but the CCC uncovered the remains in 1938. Oral records indicate a history of cider mill's in the area as well. A local logger named Ben Wood owned several acres of land in the 19th century which would become part of the state forest. Records indicate he would set up a portable sawmill off Westborough Road between the two ends of Ridge Road.

There is an area off Middle Road trail called "Pilkington’s Quarry" where Alexander Pilkington had a stone quarry. There is evidence of this off trail, the discarded round stone cuts remain.

=== State Forest Commission and CCC ===
Grove of 80 year old Sawara Cypress trees planted in the 1930s by the Civilian Conservation Corps

In the late 19th century, locals became concerned with the amount of logging taking place and its impact on erosion and the habitat. In 1914 the Massachusetts State Legislature created the State Forest Commission and appropriated a budget of $90,000 for land purchases, so long as no more than $5 per acre was spent. On March 29, 1915, the first piece of land was donated to the new state forest, a 60-acre parcel by D.W. Gaskill of Blackstone. As part of this initiative the state began purchasing land in Upton and other surrounding communities in 1933 and 1934. In 1935, the new forest was designated and Camp SP 25, CCC opened.

Through the further purchase and donation of some 2000 acres in 1935, the forest became the site of a CCC camp that was active until 1938. During that time, workers constructed administrative buildings, barracks, a recreation hall, and workshop buildings. Other work included the construction of two forest roads, picnic areas, and an earthen dam that created 10-acre Dean Pond. The camp's remaining buildings and parade ground are located off Westboro Road near the intersection of Park Road and Spring Street.

== Activities and amenities ==
The state forest offers trails for hiking, mountain biking, horseback riding, cross-country skiing, and snowmobiling as well as opportunities for fishing, restricted hunting, and picnicking.

== See also ==
- National Register of Historic Places listings in Worcester County, Massachusetts
