= Blackstone River Valley National Historical Park =

National Park Service unit in Rhode Island and Massachusetts, United States

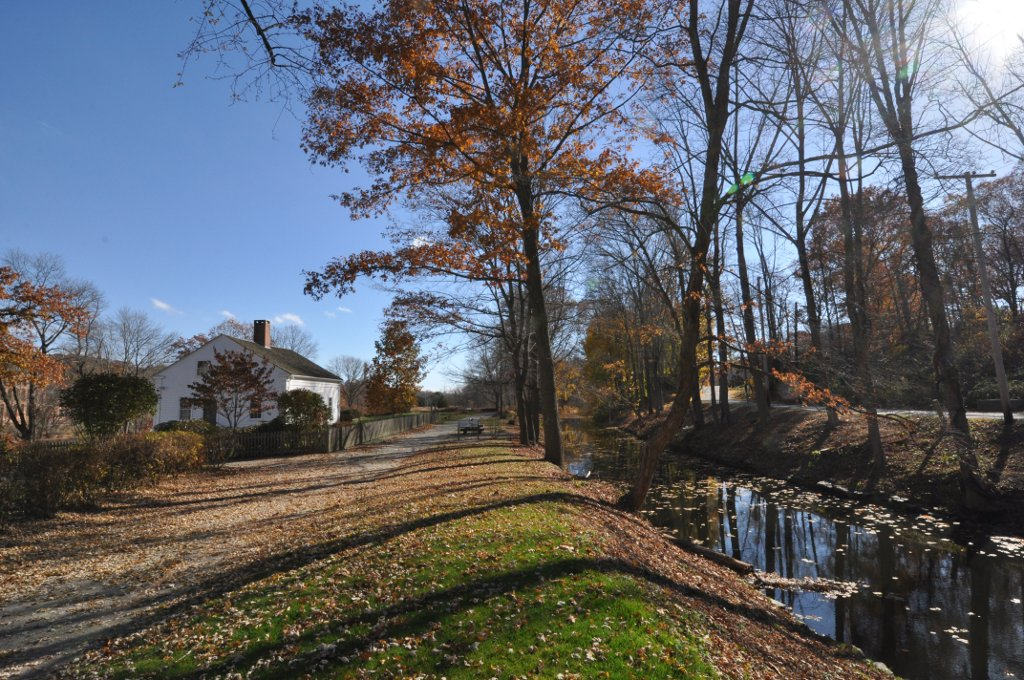
- Blackstone Canal

- Location within Rhode Island Location within Massachusetts Location within the United States
- Location: Providence County, Rhode Island/Worcester County, Massachusetts, United States
- Nearest city: Pawtucket, Rhode Island
- Coordinates: 41°52′39″N 71°22′57″W
- Created: December 19, 2014
- Governing body: National Park Service, State, Private
- Website: Blackstone River Valley National Historical Park

Blackstone River Valley National Historical Park is a National Park Service unit in the states of Rhode Island and Massachusetts. The park was created for the purpose of preserving, protecting, and interpreting the industrial heritage of the Blackstone River Valley and the urban, rural, and agricultural landscape of that region. The Blackstone River Valley was the site of some of the earliest successful textile mills in the United States, and these mills contributed significantly to the earliest American Industrial Revolution. The subsequent construction of the Blackstone Canal, a few years after the successful completion of the Erie Canal, helped to sustain the region's industrial strength.

The park's establishment was included as part of the National Defense Authorization Act for Fiscal Year 2015, which was signed into law by President Barack Obama on December 19, 2014.

It is closely related to the Blackstone River Valley National Heritage Corridor, which is not a unit of the National Park System, but the National Historical Park contains only a subset of the sites associated with that National Heritage Area. The Blackstone River Valley National Heritage Corridor continues to exist independently of the National Historical Park.

== Background ==
Samuel Slater, an English industrialist, constructed his first textile mill in Pawtucket, in 1793, along the Blackstone River. In addition to utilizing advanced new technology he had learned about in England, which had previously never been used in an American mill, Slater implemented an innovative management style that helped his factory find significant success. He went on to establish other factories, including the company towns like the village of Slatersville in North Smithfield, Rhode Island. The textile industry continued to expand in the Blackstone region, spawning numerous mill towns. By the late 1820s, the industry was thriving to such an extent that more efficient transportation methods were needed, which led to the construction of the Blackstone Canal connecting Worcester, Massachusetts to the sea port at Providence, Rhode Island. The region's advances were an important component in American industrial history.

This history was deemed nationally significant by Congress in 1986 when it created the Blackstone River Valley National Heritage Corridor, a collaboration between the National Park Service, state and local governments, and non-profit entities to encourage preservation and tourism in the region. In looking for ways to enhance achieving those goals, Congress requested that the National Park Service conduct a special resource study to determine if certain sites in the region should be included as a formal unit of the National Park System. This study was completed in 2011, and recommended the creation of a National Historical Park, which was then established in 2014.

== Park sites ==
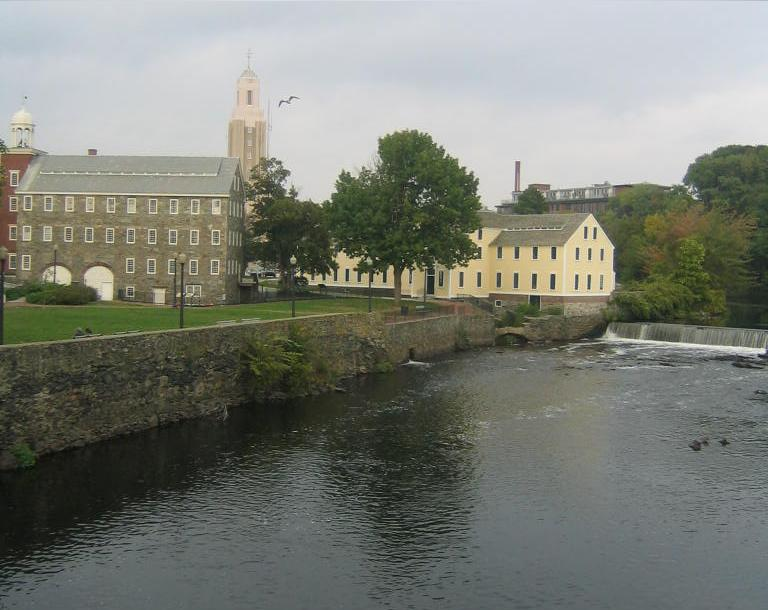
Slater Mill

Based on its establishment legislation, the park encompasses the following sites:

- Blackstone River State Park, Rhode Island: This park borders both the Blackstone River and Canal and contains bike paths, walking trails, and river access. The Wilbur Kelly Museum, built by former merchant ship's captain and mill owner Wilbur Kelly, is also within the park, and the museum tells the story of the region's transportation history.
- Ashton Historic District, Rhode Island: Built in 1867 by the Lonsdale Company, the Ashton Mill village is the second generation textile mill village expanded from Wilbur Kelly's mill that was located directly across the Blackstone River in what is now the Blackstone River State Park.
- Slater Mill National Historic Landmark District, Rhode Island: Originally built in 1793, the Slater Mill is one of the oldest successful textile mills in the United States and a contributor to the industrial development of the region. The mill complex is a National Historic Landmark.
- Slatersville Historic District, Rhode Island: This district includes the Slatersville Mill and the company town established by Samuel Slater after he had achieved success at the original Slater Mill in Pawtucket. The district is listed on the National Register of Historic Places.
- Whitinsville Historic District, Massachusetts: This district is centered around an 1826 brick mill building. The district is listed on the National Register of Historic Places.
- Hopedale Village Historic District, Massachusetts: This district includes a historic 19th century mill complex. The district is listed on the National Register of Historic Places.
- the Blackstone River itself, its tributaries, and the Blackstone Canal
