= Old Ashton Historic District =

Historic district in Rhode Island, United States

- U.S. National Register of Historic Places
- U.S. Historic district
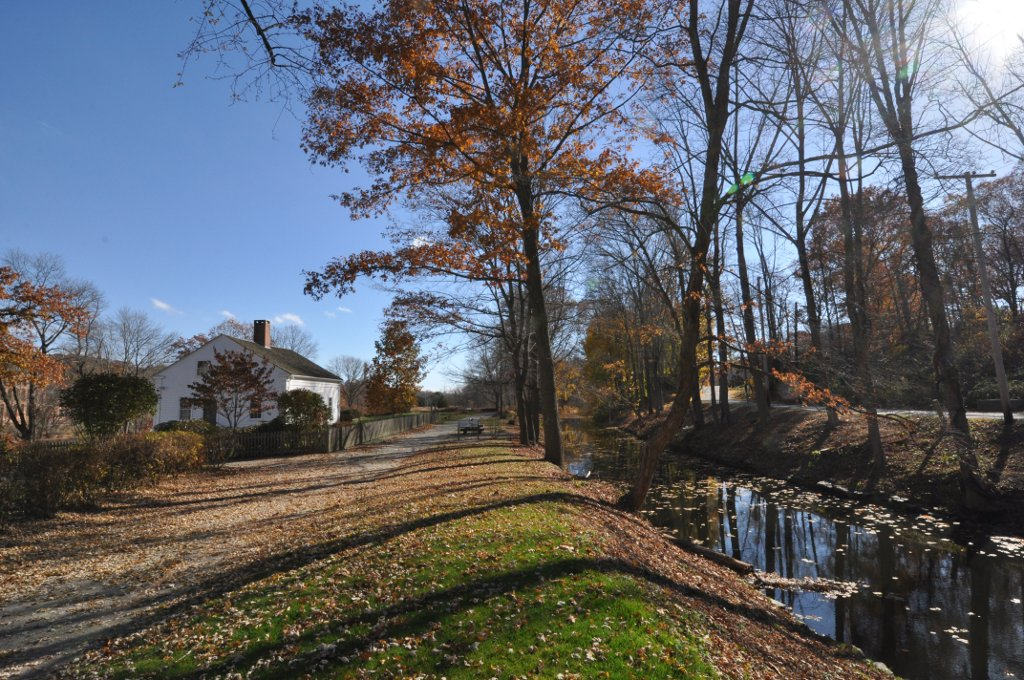
- Kelley House and the Blackstone Canal

- Location within Rhode Island Location within the United States
- Location: Lincoln, Rhode Island
- Coordinates: 41°56′11″N 71°26′2″W
- Built: 1809
- MPS: Lincoln MRA
- NRHP reference No.: 84002037
- Added to NRHP: August 30, 1984

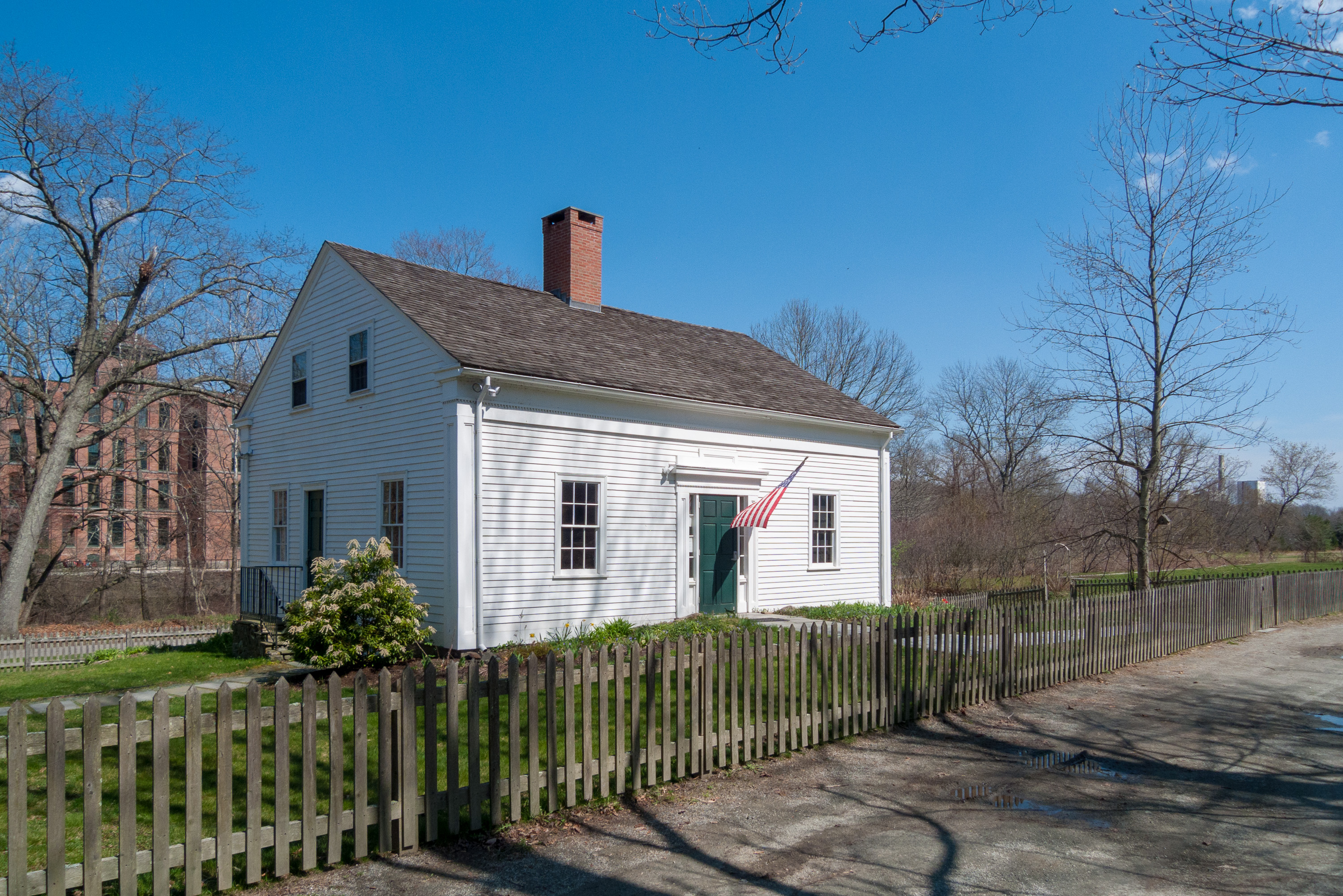
Captain Wilbur Kelly House Museum

The Old Ashton Historic District is a historic district encompassing an early 18th-century industrial area along Lower River Road in Lincoln, Rhode Island. It includes the site of the first textile mill in Lincoln, which was established in 1810–15, and whose original mill building no longer survives. The proprietors of the mill built a series of modest worker houses on Lower River Road, which are now separated from the mill site by a section of the Blackstone Canal. The only structure near the mill site is the Kelly House, built in the 1820s by Wilbur Kelly, one of the mill owners. The area is now a stopping point in Blackstone River Bikeway State Park, with interpretive signs explaining the area's history.

The district was listed on the National Register of Historic Places in 1984.

== See also ==
- Ashton Historic District, a later mill complex across the river in Cumberland
- National Register of Historic Places listings in Providence County, Rhode Island
