= Albion, Rhode Island =

Coordinates: 41°57′04″N 71°27′16″W

- Albion Historic District
- U.S. National Register of Historic Places
- U.S. Historic district
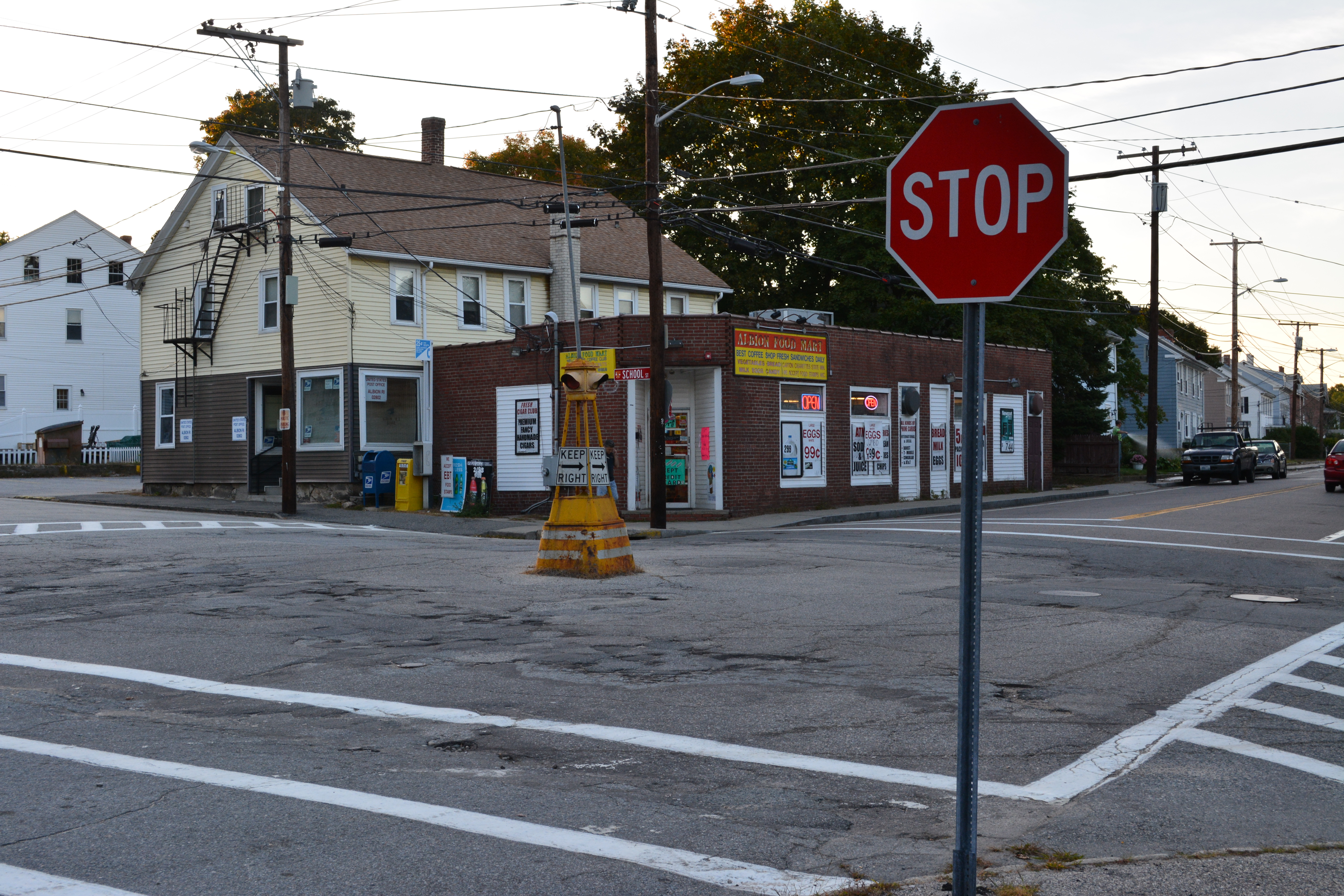

- Location within Rhode Island
- Location: Lincoln, Rhode Island
- Built: 1830
- Architectural style: Italianate, Queen Anne
- NRHP reference No.: 84001899
- Added to NRHP: July 19, 1984

Albion is a village and historic district in Lincoln, Rhode Island, United States.

Albion is home to several mill buildings, churches, and the Kirkbrae Country Club golf course. The historic Blackstone River flows through the center of the mill village with the Blackstone River Greenway, a dual use bicycle and pedestrian path running along the river. Albion Falls is a waterfall along the Blackstone River, and the Albion Bridge crosses the river just downstream from Albion Dam, built in 1916 to power the Albion Mill, now a condominium complex. The word "Albion", from which the mill and village take their name, is the oldest name for Great Britain. The still-active Providence and Worcester Railroad passes through Albion.

== See also ==
- List of bridges documented by the Historic American Engineering Record in Rhode Island
- National Register of Historic Places listings in Providence County, Rhode Island
