= Pullen Corner School =

- Pullen’s Corner Schoolhouse
- U.S. National Register of Historic Places
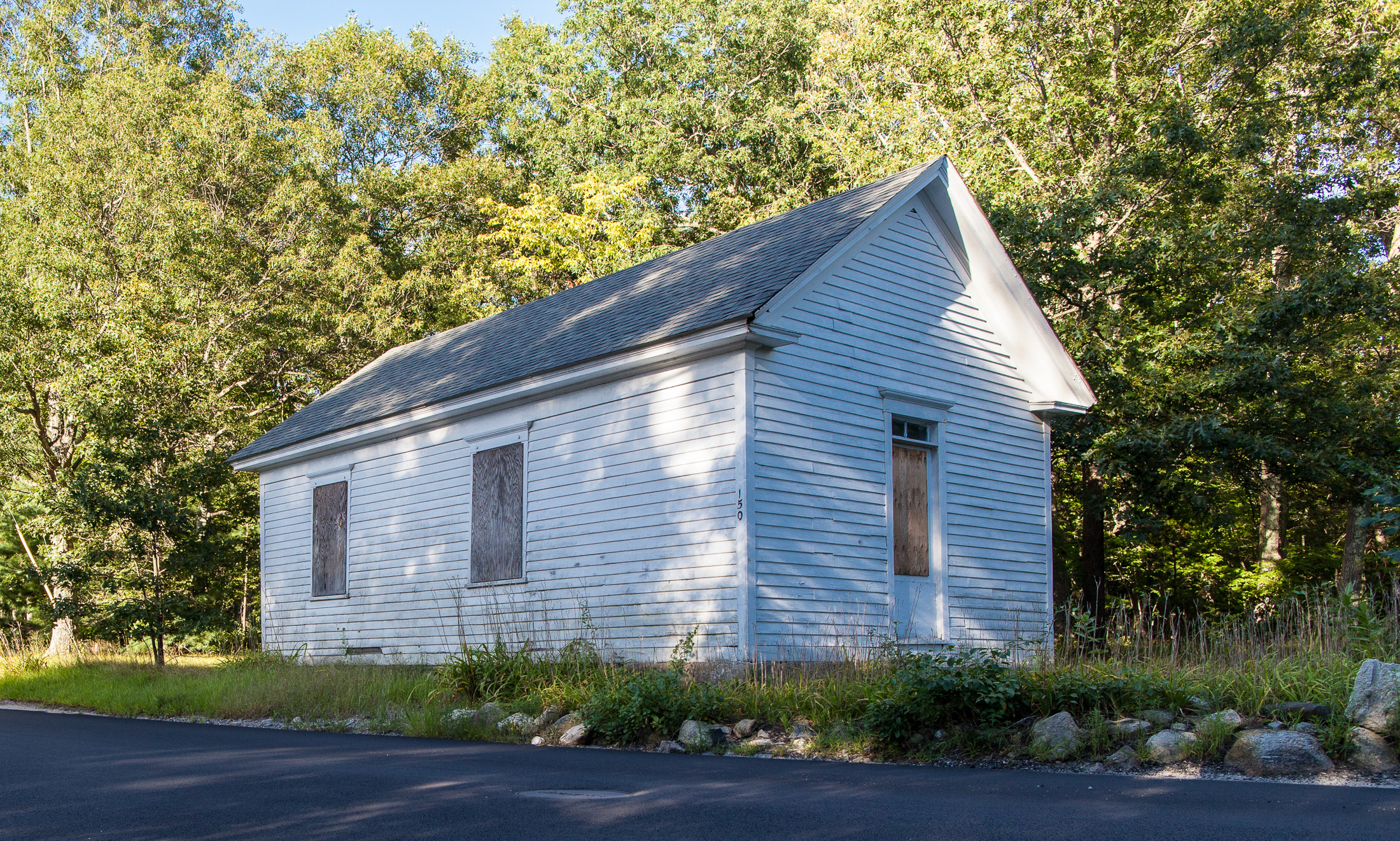
- Pullen Corner School in 2013

- Location within Rhode Island Location within the United States
- Location: Lincoln, Rhode Island
- Coordinates: 41°53′44″N 71°28′6″W
- Built: 1840
- MPS: Lincoln MRA
- NRHP reference No.: 84002039
- Added to NRHP: August 30, 1984

The Pullen’s Corner Schoolhouse, also called the Hot Potato School, is a historic schoolhouse located at Chase Farm in Lincoln, Rhode Island. It is a small wood-frame structure with a gable roof, set on a granite foundation. The building is a single bay wide and two deep, with the interior divided into a small vestibule area and a single classroom. The property also includes a woodshed and privy. The schoolhouse was built c. 1840, and was one of the first schoolhouses built by the town.

Pullen’s Corner Schoolhouse was originally part of Smithfield in School District No. 19. After the division of the Town of Smithfield in 1871, it was in Lincoln.

Its original site was in what is now northwestern part of Lincoln. In 2016, the schoolhouse was restored and relocated to Chase Farm. The building was re-opened for visitors in 2018.

Pullen’s Corner Schoolhouse was nicknamed the Hot Potato School because one of the teachers would provide lunch for the students by cooking potatoes on the school’s stove.

The building was listed on the National Register of Historic Places in 1984.

== See also ==
- National Register of Historic Places listings in Providence County, Rhode Island
