= Hearthside =

Historic house in Rhode Island, United States

- Hearthside House
- U.S. National Register of Historic Places
- U.S. Historic district – Contributing property
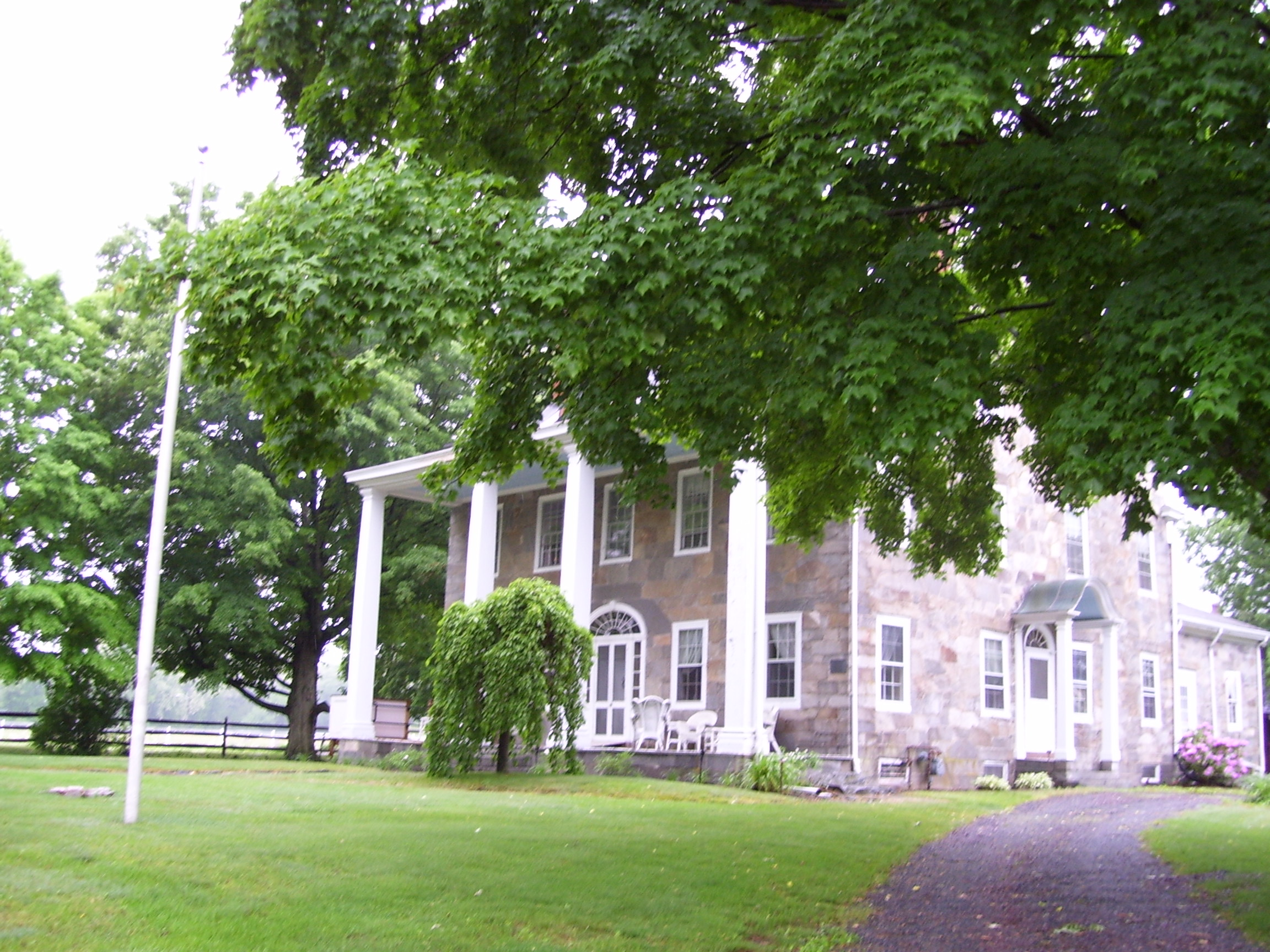

- Location within Rhode Island Location within the United States
- Location: Lincoln, Rhode Island
- Coordinates: 41°54′23″N 71°25′50″W
- Built: 1810
- Part of: Great Road Historic District (ID74000051)
- NRHP reference No.: 73000069

Significant dates
- Added to NRHP: April 24, 1973
- Designated CP: July 22, 1974

Hearthside is a historic house in Lincoln, Rhode Island at 677 Great Road (Rt. 123), at the intersection of Breakneck Hill Road.

Stephen Hopkins Smith built this Federal style house in 1810 of fieldstone and it contains 10 fireplaces or hearths. Smith allegedly built the house with winnings from the Louisiana state lottery to unsuccessfully woo a woman from Providence. Frederick C. Sayles bought the property in 1901. Hearthside served as a private residence until 1996 until the town of Lincoln purchased the property and the "Friends of Hearthside", a nonprofit organization, became overseers of the property.

The house was listed on the National Register of Historic Places in 1973.

== See also ==
- National Register of Historic Places listings in Providence County, Rhode Island
