= Ashton Historic District (Cumberland, Rhode Island) =

Historic district in Rhode Island, United States

Coordinates: 41°56′15.43″N 71°25′57.09″W

- U.S. National Register of Historic Places
- U.S. Historic district
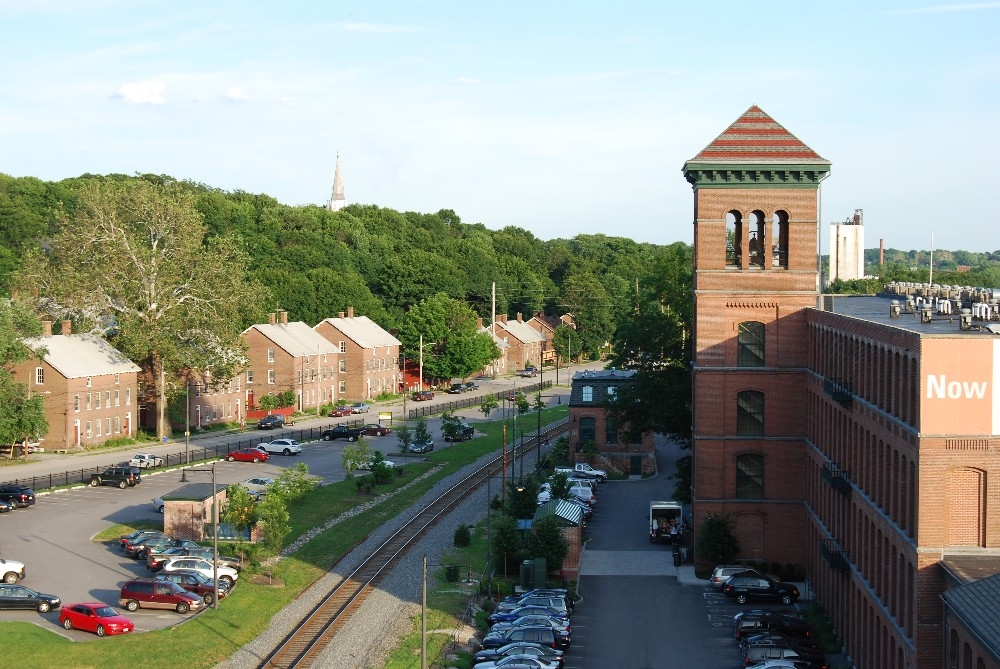

- Location within Rhode Island Location within the United States
- Location: Cumberland, Rhode Island
- Area: 61 acres (25 ha)
- NRHP reference No.: 84000367
- Added to NRHP: November 1, 1984

The Ashton Historic District is a historic district in Cumberland, Rhode Island. The district consists of a mill and an adjacent mill village that was built for the workers of the mill. It lies between Mendon Road, Scott Road, Angell Road, Store Hill Road, Front Street and Middle Street. The district was added to the National Register of Historic Places on November 1, 1984.

In 1867, in a program of further expansion, the Lonsdale Company erected a large, three and-one-half-story, mansard-roof brick mill at Ashton on the east side of the Blackstone River north of Lonsdale. It was later enlarged to four full stories with a flat roof.

A compact group of associated brick row houses and other buildings, including a handsome mansard-roofed office, also were built. This mill played a major role in 19th-century textile technology and was the site of the first large-scale test of the high-speed Sawyer spindle, one of the earliest of its type developed in the United States. The mill houses here are noteworthy for their simple form and dense arrangement.

In 1922, it's textile mills were temporarily shutdown by the New England Textile Strike over an attempted wage cut and hours increase.

The village is tucked into a narrow, low flood plain site at the bottom of a bluff carrying Mendon Road (Rhode Island Route 122) in this section.

== See also ==
- Old Ashton Historic District, across the river in Lincoln
- National Register of Historic Places listings in Providence County, Rhode Island
