= Elliot–Harris–Miner House =

Historic house in Rhode Island, United States

- U.S. National Register of Historic Places
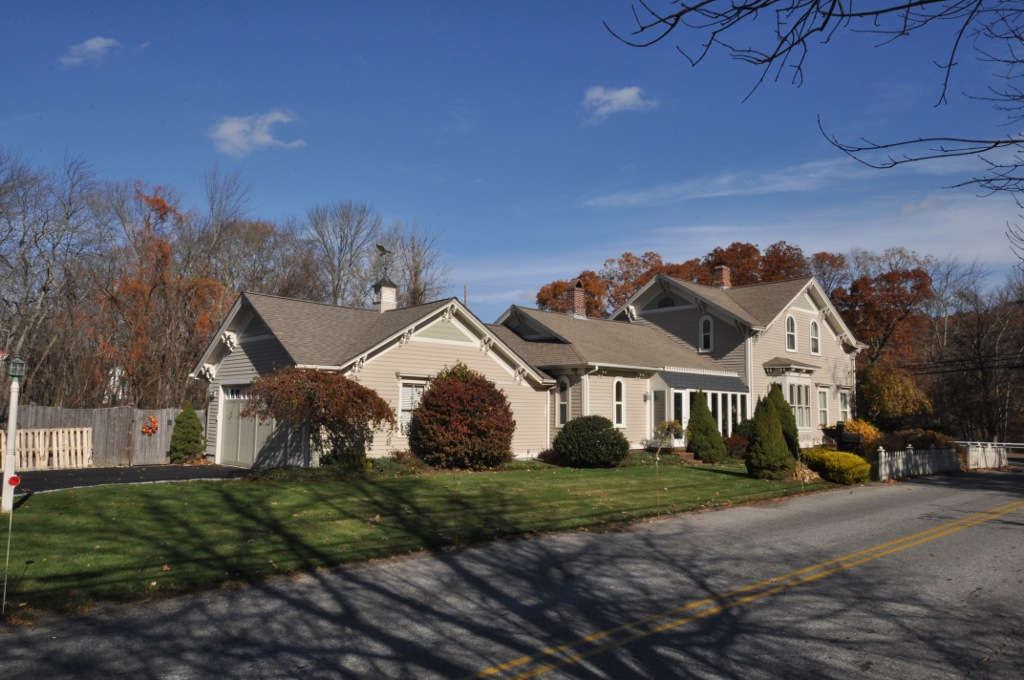

- Location within Rhode Island Location within the United States
- Location: Lincoln, Rhode Island
- Coordinates: 41°52′43″N 71°26′11″W
- Built: 1710
- MPS: Lincoln MRA
- NRHP reference No.: 84001984
- Added to NRHP: August 30, 1984

The Elliot–Harris–Miner House is an historic house located at 1406 Old Louisquisset Pike in Lincoln, Rhode Island. It is a rambling three-section structure, whose main block is 2 1/2 stories tall with a cross-gable roof with bracketed eaves. The oldest portion of the house, however, was at its rear: it was originally a 1 1/2-story Cape style structure built c. 1710, but this has been torn down and replaced by a garage with a cross-gable roof matching that of the main block. These two sections are joined by a third section with a gable roof. The rear section was believed to be the oldest surviving Cape in Lincoln.

The house was listed on the National Register of Historic Places on August 30, 1984.

== See also ==
- National Register of Historic Places listings in Providence County, Rhode Island
