= Israel Arnold House =

Historic house in Rhode Island, United States

- U.S. National Register of Historic Places
- U.S. Historic district – Contributing property
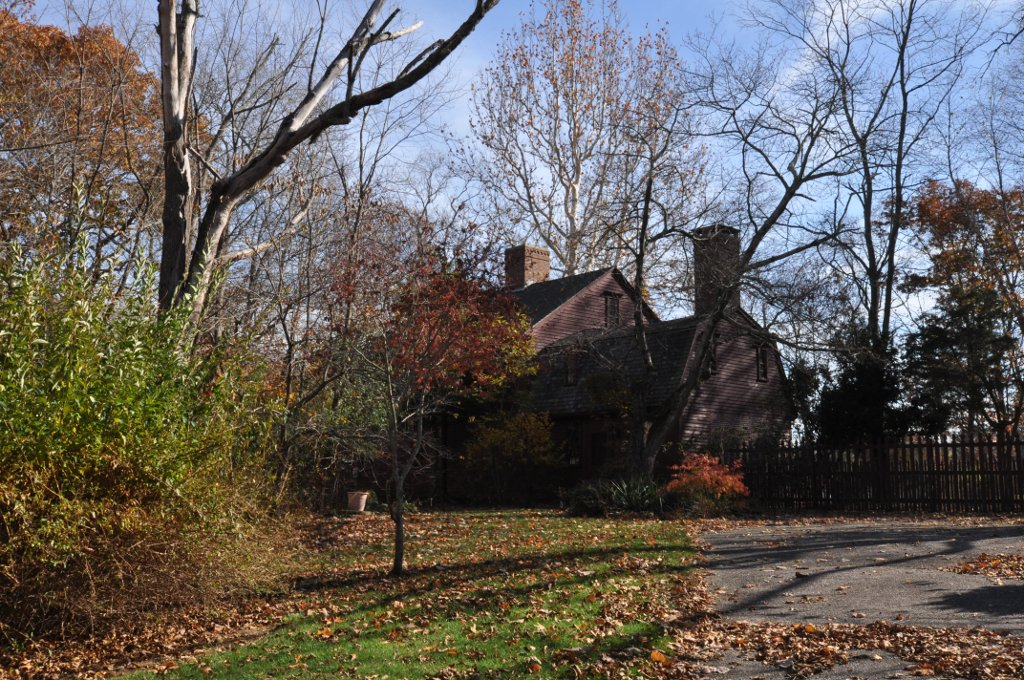

- Location within Rhode Island Location within the United States
- Location: Lincoln, Rhode Island
- Coordinates: 41°54′17″N 71°25′35″W
- Built: 1720
- Part of: Great Road Historic District (ID74000051)
- NRHP reference No.: 70000017

Significant dates
- Added to NRHP: December 18, 1970
- Designated CP: July 22, 1974

The Israel Arnold House is an historic house on Great Road in Lincoln, Rhode Island. It is a 2 1/2-story wood-frame structure, set on a hillside lot on the south side of Great Road. The main block is five bays wide, with a central chimney rising through the gable roof. A 1 1/2-story gambrel-roofed ell extends to one side. The ell is the oldest portion of the house, built c. 1720 by someone named Olney. The main block was built c. 1760. The house was owned into the 20th century by four generations of individuals named Israel Arnold.

The house was listed on the National Register of Historic Places on December 18, 1970.

== See also ==
- Eleazer Arnold House
- National Register of Historic Places listings in Providence County, Rhode Island
