= Lincoln Woods State Park =

State park in Providence County, Rhode Island

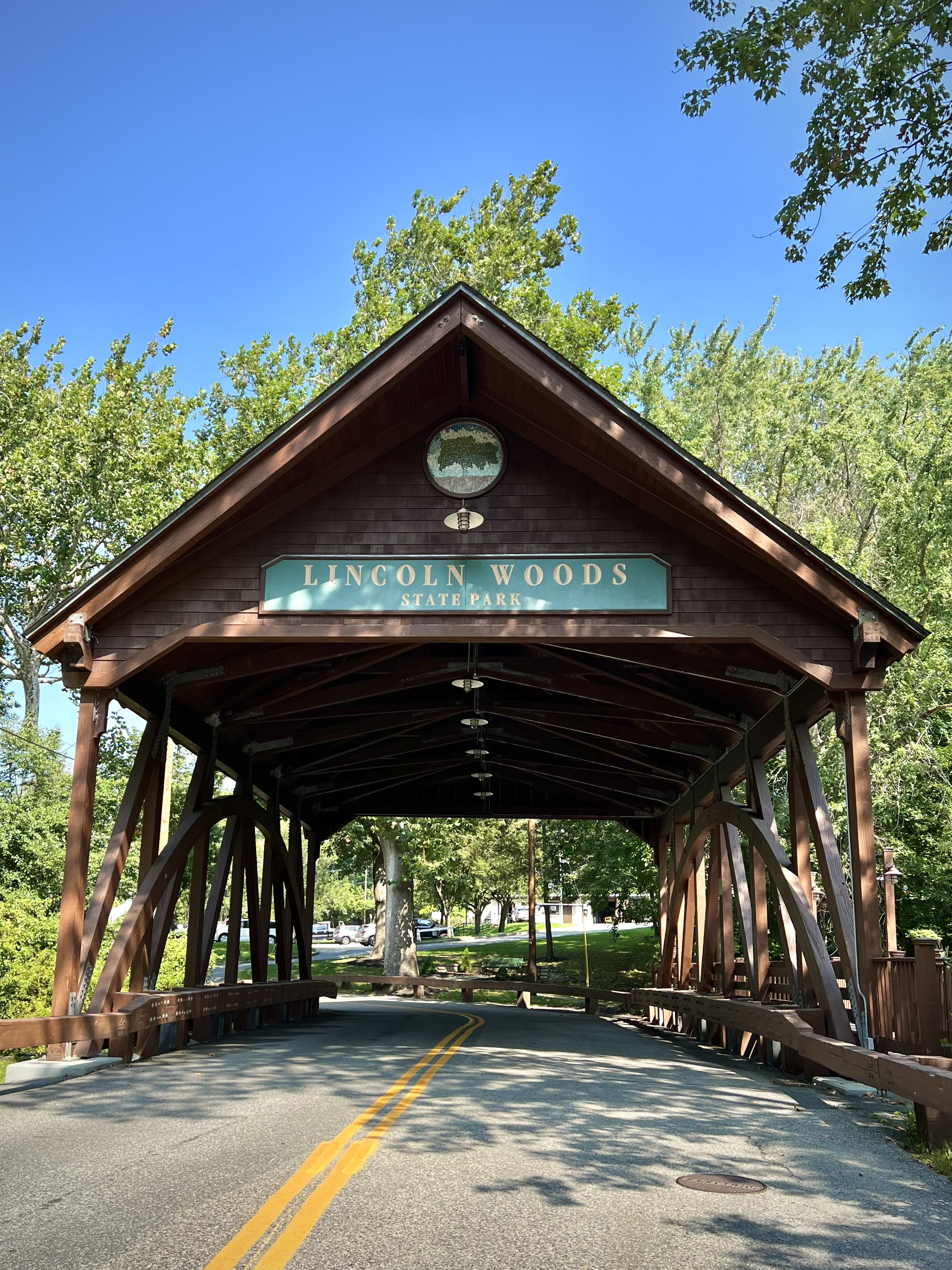
- Lincoln Woods' covered entryway

- Location within Rhode Island
- Interactive map of Lincoln Woods State Park
- Location: Lincoln, Rhode Island, United States
- Coordinates: 41°53′28″N 71°25′55″W
- Area: 627 acres (254 ha)
- Elevation: 197 ft (60 m)
- Established: 1908
- Named for: Abraham Lincoln
- Administrator: Rhode Island Department of Environmental Management, Division of Parks & Recreation
- Website: Official website
- Rhode Island State Parks

Lincoln Woods State Park is a public recreation area covering 627 acres (254 ha) around Olney Pond four miles (6.4 km) northwest of Pawtucket in the town of Lincoln, Rhode Island. The state park is known for its giant glacial boulders and the stony nature of its terrain which prevented most of the parkland from being used as farmland or for other development.

== History ==
Named in honor of President Abraham Lincoln, the park traces its origins to the state's purchase of Quinsnicket Pond and 71 additional acres in 1908. It had its official founding on the 100th anniversary of Abraham Lincoln’s birth, February 12, 1909. Until the 1940s, the park was popularly known as Quinsnicket, a faux Indian name commonly said to mean something like The Domain of Many Rocks. Quinsnicket was actually a name invented by white settlers, and the original Indian name for the area was Caucaunjaivatchuck.

== Activities and amenities ==
The park offers a freshwater beach, extensive picnicking facilities, trails for equestrians, mountain bikers, snowmobilers, and hikers, boating, ice skating, and fishing areas and game fields. Canoe rentals, kayak rentals and kayaking lessons are offered by a concessionaire. The park is also known for bouldering, a type of rock climbing that does not utilize ropes or harnesses.

== In popular culture ==
The park was a favorite haunt of the author H. P. Lovecraft, who spent summer days walking in the park and writing long letters recording vivid accounts of the park's landscape and ambiance. In 2011, part of the film Moonrise Kingdom was filmed at the park.
