= Ballou House (Lincoln, Rhode Island) =

Historic house in Rhode Island, United States

- U.S. National Register of Historic Places
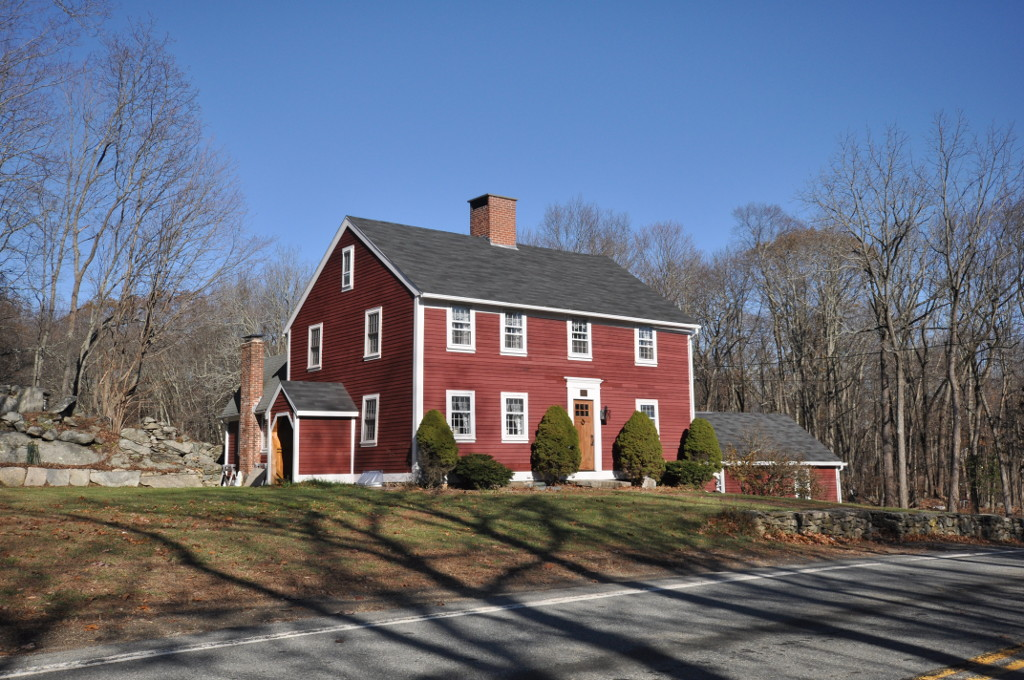

- Location within Rhode Island Location within the United States
- Location: Lincoln, Rhode Island
- Coordinates: 41°56′48″N 71°28′21″W
- Built: 1782
- Architectural style: Federal
- MPS: Lincoln MRA
- NRHP reference No.: 84001908
- Added to NRHP: August 30, 1984

The Ballou House is an historic house on Albion Road in Lincoln, Rhode Island, USA. It is a 2½ story wood-frame structure, five bays wide, with a large central chimney. A single-story gable-roof wing (estimated to be 19th century in origin) extends to the east, and a 20th-century gambrel-roofed ell extends to the north. The house was probably built c. 1782 by Moses Ballou, from one of the first families to settle in the area, and was owned by his descendants through most of the 19th century.

The house was listed on the National Register of Historic Places on August 30, 1984.

== See also ==
- National Register of Historic Places listings in Providence County, Rhode Island
