= Whipple–Cullen House and Barn =

Historic house in Rhode Island, United States

- U.S. National Register of Historic Places
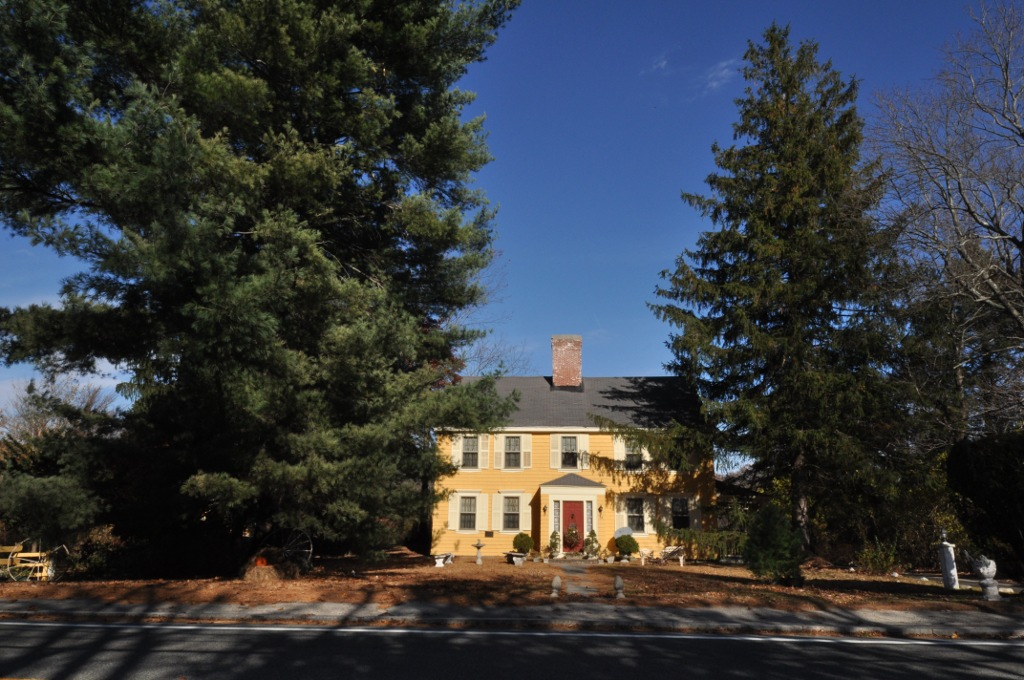

- Location within Rhode Island Location within the United States
- Location: Lincoln, Rhode Island
- Coordinates: 41°55′49″N 71°26′31″W
- Built: 1740
- Architectural style: Colonial
- MPS: Lincoln MRA
- NRHP reference No.: 91001647
- Added to NRHP: November 14, 1991

The Whipple–Cullen House and Barn is an historic farmstead on Old River Road in Lincoln, Rhode Island. The main house is a 2 1/2-story wood-frame structure, five bays wide, with a large central chimney and a gable roof. An addition extends to the rear, and a 19th-century porch is on the side of the house. The barn, dating to the late 19th century, is north of the house, and there is a former farm shed, now converted to a garage, to its south. The property is located across the street from the Lincoln town offices. The house, built c. 1740, is one of the town's least-altered 18th century houses, and the barn is a rare survivor of the town's agrarian past.

The property was listed on the National Register of Historic Places in 1991.

== See also ==
- National Register of Historic Places listings in Providence County, Rhode Island
