= Lime Kilns (Lincoln, Rhode Island) =

- U.S. National Register of Historic Places
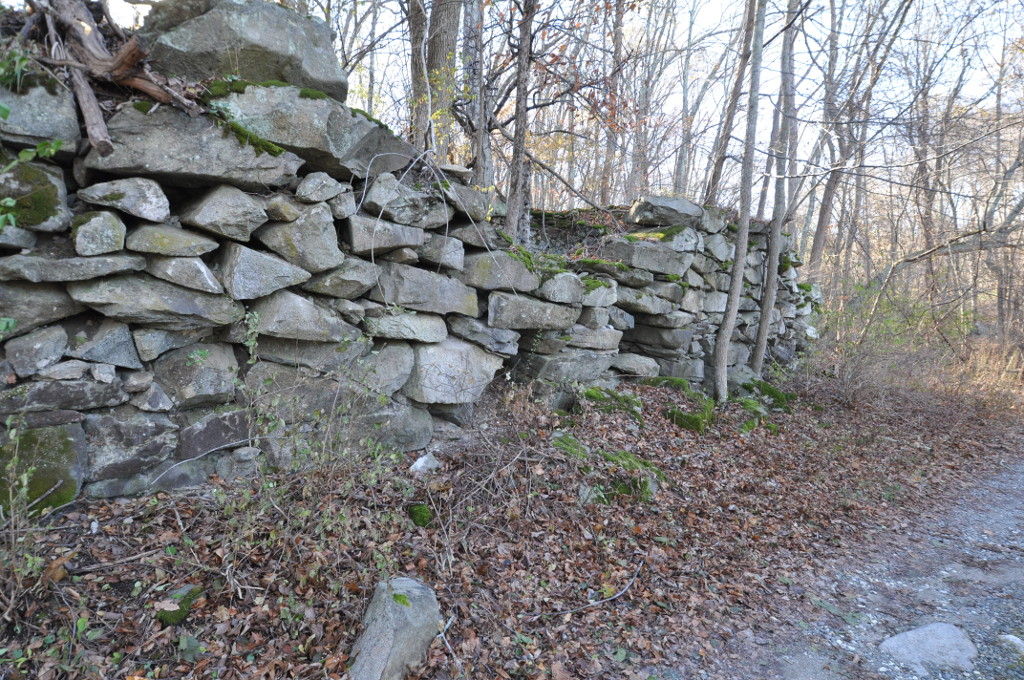
- Lime kiln remains off Sherman Avenue

- Location within Rhode Island Location within the United States
- Location: Lincoln, Rhode Island
- Built: 1750; 276 years ago
- MPS: Lincoln MRA
- NRHP reference No.: 84002015
- Added to NRHP: August 30, 1984

The Lime Kilns of Lincoln, Rhode Island, are the remnants of three colonial-era lime kilns, all that is left of one of the oldest lime processing operations in North America. They are located respectively off Louisquisset Pike, Sherman and Dexter Rock Roads in an area that has been known for its lime processing since the 17th century. When originally built, they were roughly cylindrical structures fashioned out of unmortared rubble stone. The first kiln, whose ruins are located near the Flanagan campus of the Community College of Rhode Island west of Louisquisset Pike (approximately ), was the largest of the three, nearly 20 feet (6.1 m) in diameter. The second kiln remains are located to the south of Sherman Avenue, near its junction with Louisquisset Pike (approximately ). In 1984 the standing walls were 8 feet (2.4 m) high, with three recognizable openings. The third kiln, of which only a partial wall remains standing, is located on the south side of Dexter Rock Road (approximately ).

The kilns were listed on the National Register of Historic Places in 1984.

== See also ==
- National Register of Historic Places listings in Providence County, Rhode Island
