= Pawtucket Falls (Rhode Island) =

Waterfall in Rhode Island, United States

Coordinates: 41°52′37.69″N 71°22′56.18″W

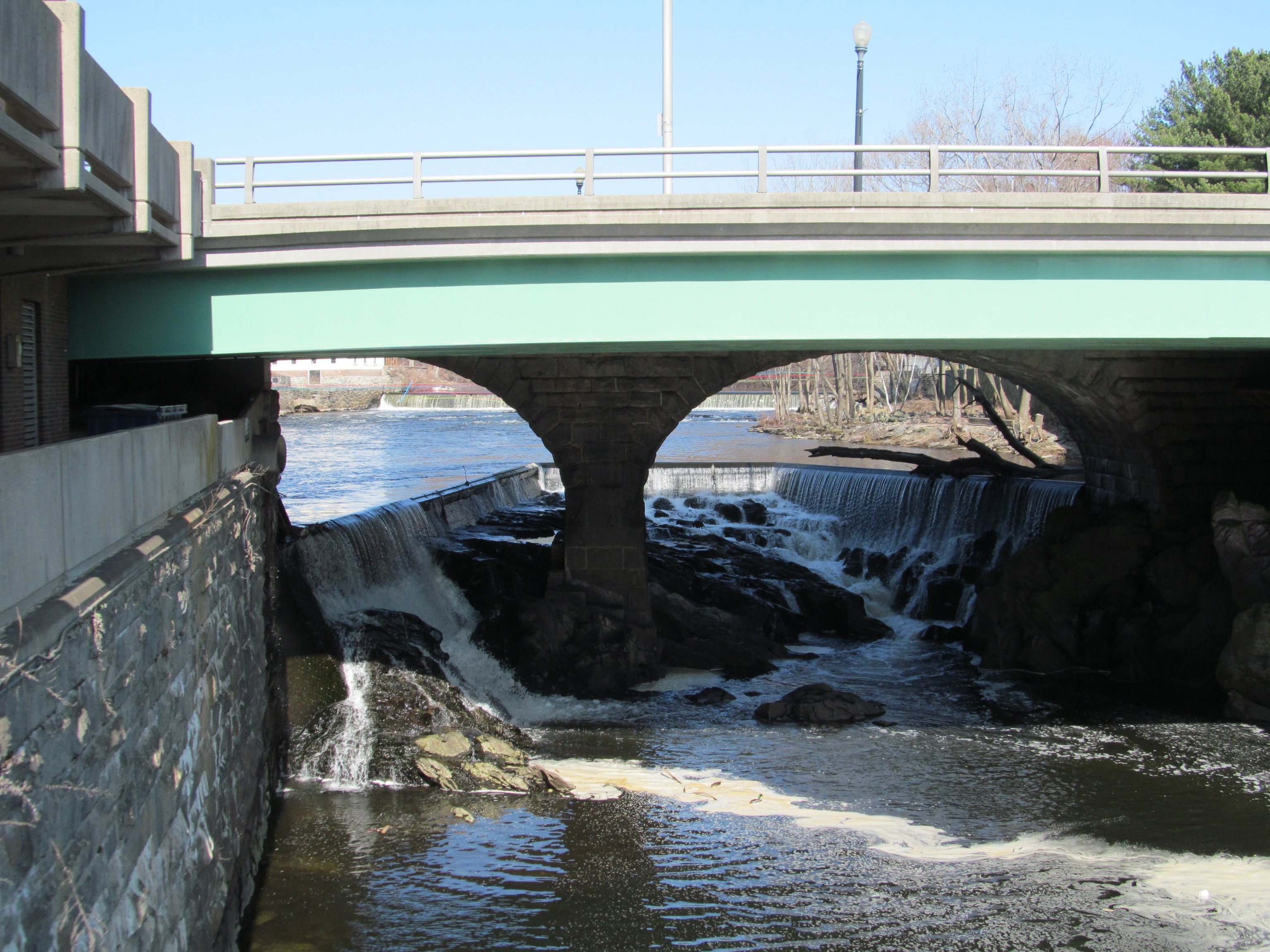
Pawtucket Falls

Pawtucket Falls is a waterfall on the Blackstone River in Pawtucket, Rhode Island. The falls are located a half mile upstream from where the Blackstone flows into the Pawtucket River. The falls provided power for Samuel Slater’s cotton spinning mill, which was built in 1793 and is said to have been responsible for starting the Industrial Revolution in America.

== Etymology ==
Pawtucket is an Algonkian word meaning "at the falls in the river (tidal stream)".

== See also ==
- List of waterfalls
- List of place names of Native American origin in New England
