= Lincoln, Rhode Island =

- Town
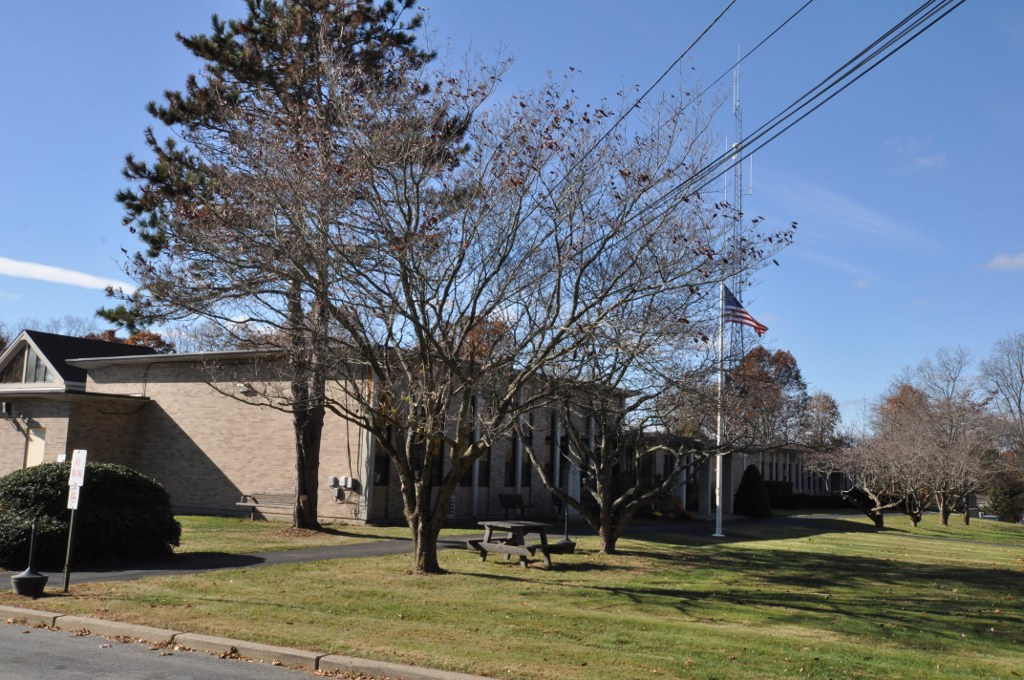
- The town offices of Lincoln

- Seal Logo

- Location in Providence County and the state of Rhode Island.
- Coordinates: 41°55′16″N 71°26′6″W
- Country: United States
- State: Rhode Island
- County: Providence

Government
  - Type: Elected administrator-council w/ Financial Town Meeting
  - Town Administrator: Philip G. Gould (I)
  - Town Council: Keith E. Macksoud, President (I); Pamela M. Azar (D); Arthur S. Russo, Jr (I); Bruce J. Ogni (I); Kenneth G. Pichette (R)

Area
  - Total: 19.0 sq mi (49.1 km^{2})
  - Land: 18.2 sq mi (47.2 km^{2})
  - Water: 0.73 sq mi (1.9 km^{2})
- Elevation: 190 ft (58 m)

Population (2020)
  - Total: 22,529
  - Density: 1,236/sq mi (477.3/km^{2})
- Time zone: UTC-5 (Eastern (EST))
  - Summer (DST): UTC-4 (EDT)
- ZIP codes: 02802, 02865, 02838
- Area code: 401
- FIPS code: 44-41500
- GNIS feature ID: 1220074
- Website: www.lincolnri.gov

Lincoln is a town in Providence County, Rhode Island, United States. The population was 22,529 at the 2020 census. Lincoln is located in northeastern Rhode Island, north of Providence. Lincoln is part of the Providence metropolitan statistical area and the Greater Boston combined statistical area.

Lincoln was settled in the 17th century as part of the Louisquisset grant, and several colonial stone-enders still exist in the town. Lincoln Woods State Park is located within the town.

Limestone quarrying has occurred there since colonial times at the village of Lime Rock. Lincoln was a part of the town of Smithfield until 1871, when it was split off and named in honor of Abraham Lincoln. The city of Central Falls was part of Lincoln until it split off itself in 1895. Lincoln became an important mill town in the late 19th century, with many textile factories running along the Blackstone River. Lincoln's villages include Manville, Albion, Lime Rock, Lonsdale, Fairlawn, Quinnville, and Saylesville.

In 2008, the town was ranked #63 in Money Magazine's "Best Places to Live".

Lincoln is in the lower Blackstone Valley of Rhode Island and in the John H. Chafee, Blackstone River Valley National Heritage Corridor, New England's historic National Park area.

== Geography ==
According to the United States Census Bureau, the town has a total area of 18.9 square miles (49 km^{2}), of which 18.2 square miles (47 km^{2}) is land and 0.7 square miles (1.8 km^{2}) (3.80%) is water.

The town is on the west bank of the Blackstone River. Lincoln borders seven other Rhode Island municipalities, tied for the most in the state- Pawtucket and North Providence border Lincoln to the south, Central Falls and Cumberland border Lincoln to the east, Smithfield and North Smithfield border Lincoln to the west, and Woonsocket borders Lincoln to the north.

Lincoln is home to Lincoln Woods State Park and Bally's Twin River Lincoln Casino Resort (formerly a racetrack known as Lincoln Downs and Lincoln Park).

== Demographics ==
Historical population
Census	Pop.	Note	%±
1870	7,889		—
1880	13,765		74.5%
1890	20,355		47.9%
1900	8,937		−56.1%
1910	9,825		9.9%
1920	9,543		−2.9%
1930	10,421		9.2%
1940	10,577		1.5%
1950	11,270		6.6%
1960	13,551		20.2%
1970	16,182		19.4%
1980	16,949		4.7%
1990	18,045		6.5%
2000	20,898		15.8%
2010	21,105		1.0%
2020	22,529		6.7%
U.S. Decennial Census

As of the census of 2020, there were 22,529 people and 8,658 households in the town. The population density was 1,246.5 inhabitants per square mile (481.3/km^{2}). There were 9,525 housing units in the town. The racial makeup of the town was 83.6% White, 2.26% African American, 0.19% Native American, 4.09% Asian, 0.04% Pacific Islander, 2.61% from other races, and 7.22% from two or more races. Hispanic or Latino of any race were 6.67% of the population.

There were 8,658 households, out of which 33.1% had children under the age of 18 living with them, 51.3% were married couples living together, 29.6% had a female householder with no spouse present and 12.5% had a male householder with no spouse present. 9.5% of all households were made up of individuals, and 4.9% had someone living alone who was 65 years of age or older. The average household size was 2.58 and the average family size was 3.12.

In the town, the population was spread out, with 22.6% under the age of 18, 7.5% from 18 to 24, 22.8% from 25 to 44, 24.8% from 45 to 64, and 22.3% who were 65 years of age or older. The median age was 43 years.

The median income for a household in the town was $115,181, and the median income for a family was $135,845. The per capita income for the town was $53,442. About 6.5% of the population were below the poverty line, including 4.4% of those under age 18 and 6.8% of those age 65 or over.

== National Historic Register sites ==
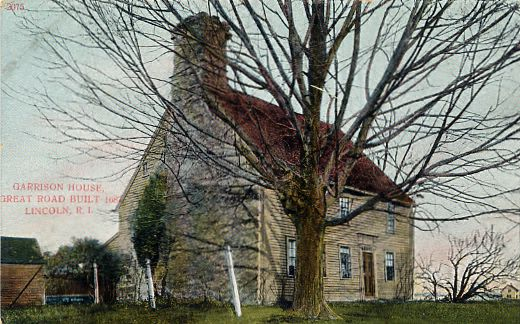
Arnold House, 1691, Lincoln, Rhode Island

- Albion Historic District
- Eleazer Arnold House
- Israel Arnold House
- Ballou House
- Elliot-Harris-Miner House
- Great Road Historic District
- Hearthside
- Jenckes House, Jenckes Hill Road
- Jenckes House, Old Louisquisset Pike
- Lime Kilns
- Limerock Village Historic District
- Old Ashton Historic District
- Pullen Corner School
- Sassafras Site, RI-55
- Saylesville Historic District
- Saylesville Meetinghouse
- Whipple-Cullen House and Barn

== Economy and infrastructure ==
=== Education ===
In total there are four elementary schools (Full day K–5): Saylesville Elementary School, Lonsdale Elementary School, Lincoln Central Elementary School, and Northern Lincoln Elementary School. Lincoln has one Middle School, and one high school, Lincoln Senior High School. Their mascot is a lion. At one point, the middle and high school shared one campus, but in 2006 a new middle school was opened on Jenckes Hill Road. The high school, in desperate need of additional classrooms, expanded into the former middle school area. The town is also home to William M. Davies, Jr. Career and Technical High School, a technical school serving students throughout the state, and the Community College of Rhode Island's Flanagan Campus is situated in Lincoln as well.

=== Healthcare ===
Lincoln is home to the Quality Assurance Review Center (QARC), which performs thousands of radiotherapy reviews per year. QARC's primary support comes from federal grants at the National Cancer Institute (NCI) and contracts with the pharmaceutical industry. It receives radiotherapy data from approximately 1,000 hospitals in both the United States and abroad. The center maintains a strategic affiliation with the University of Massachusetts Medical School in Worcester, Massachusetts, and is located along the George Washington Highway.

=== Business ===
Lincoln is also home to the Amica Mutual Insurance Company. Founded in 1907, it moved to Lincoln in 1994, after first being located in both Boston and Providence. The company mostly underwrites policies for property and casualty insurance, which includes automobiles, homeowners, and personal liabilities.

Beacon Design by Chemart was founded in 1976 in Lincoln, RI. Beacon Design by ChemArt is a U.S. wholesale manufacturer and the industry leader in metal-etched keepsakes. ChemArt is split into two divisions, Beacon Design and ChemTec. Beacon Design consists of the custom and retail ornaments and keepsakes, while ChemTec serves the company's industrial sector. The company helps create custom pieces for organizations and companies alike, with their in house design team and salespeople, they're able to make changes, assist the customer, and produce the piece all in Lincoln, RI.

== Notable people ==
- Eddie Dowling (1889–1976), actor, singer, and composer
- Hank Gilpin (born 1946), furniture maker and wood sculptor
- Kristin Hayter (born 1986), Neoclassical dark wave musician
- Clem Labine (1926–2007), major league baseball pitcher
- Sarah MacLean (born 1978), New York Times bestselling author
- Chet Nichols Jr. (1931–1995), baseball player
- David Olney (1948–2020), singer/songwriter
