= Great Road Historic District =

Historic district in Rhode Island, United States

- Great Roadians and Great Road Historic District
- U.S. National Register of Historic Places
- U.S. Historic district
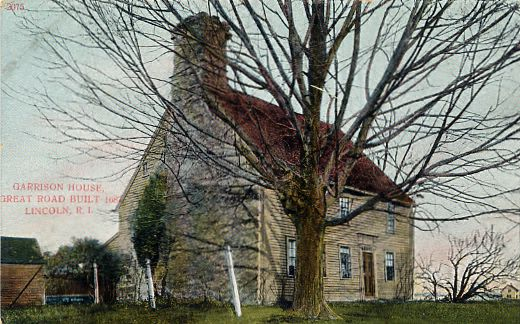
- Arnold House, 1687, on Great Road in Lincoln, Rhode Island

- Location within Rhode Island Location within the United States
- Location: Lincoln, Rhode Island
- Coordinates: 41°54′10″N 71°25′14″W
- Built: 1683
- Architect: numerous
- Architectural style: Colonial, Federal, Victorian
- NRHP reference No.: 74000051
- Added to NRHP: July 22, 1974

The Great Road Historic District is a historic district in Lincoln, Rhode Island, commemorating a portion of Rhode Island's oldest highway, dating back to 1683. Great Road served as the main connection between Providence, Hartford and Worcester during colonial times. The district includes a 0.6-mile (0.97 km) section of the road, which winds along the Moshassuck River between a junction with Breakneck Hill Road and another with Front Street. Notable historic properties along this stretch of road include the National Historic Landmark Eleazer Arnold House, a stone-ender built in 1687, which is now a museum operated by Historic New England, the 1812 Moffett Mill, the Israel Arnold House, and Hearthside, the 1810 home of Stephen Smith, who established the adjacent Butteryfly Mill in 1811.

The district was listed on the National Register of Historic Places in 1974.

== See also ==
- National Register of Historic Places listings in Providence County, Rhode Island
