= Blackstone River =

River in Massachusetts and Rhode Island, USA

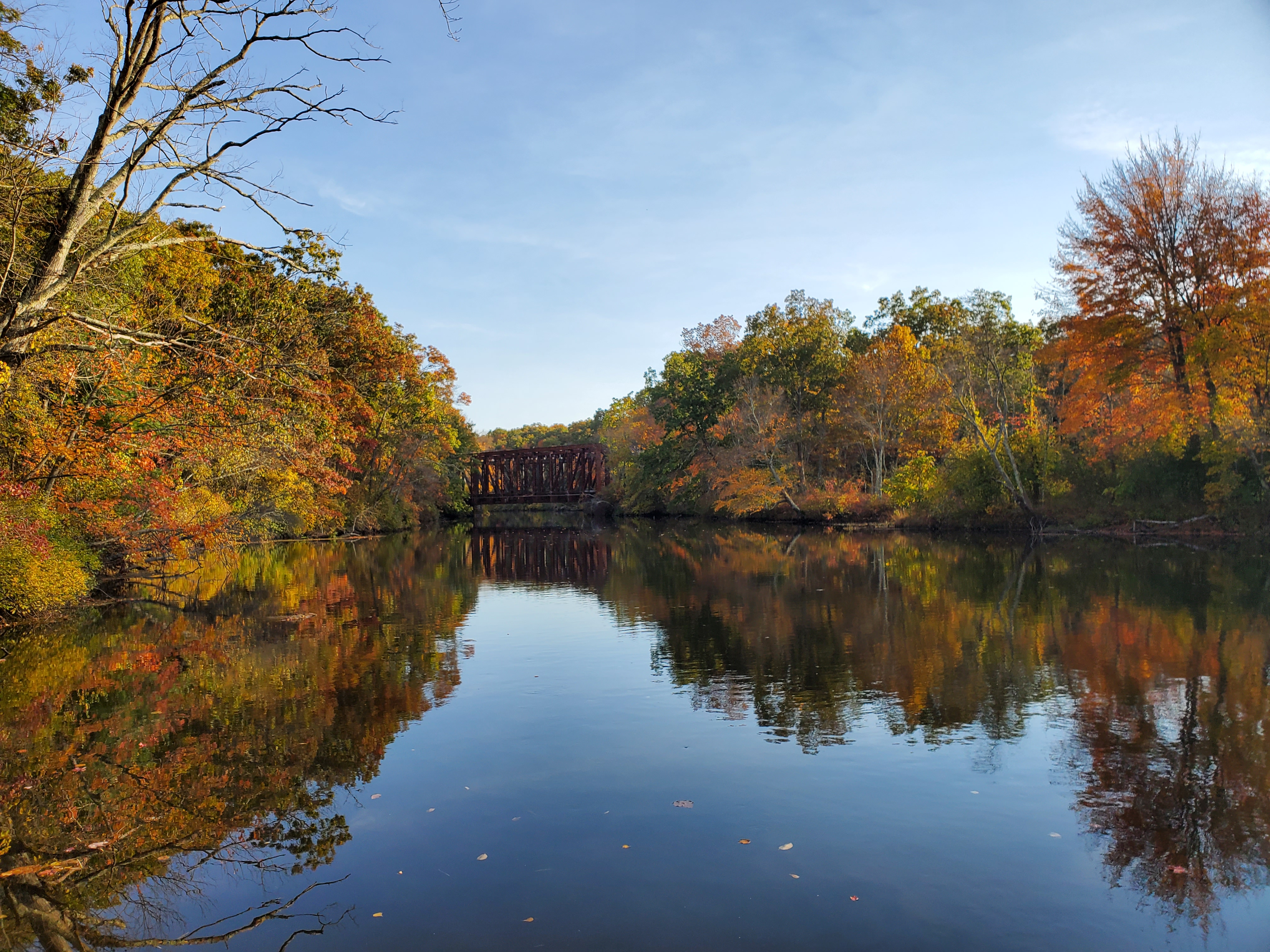
- The Blackstone River in Massachusetts

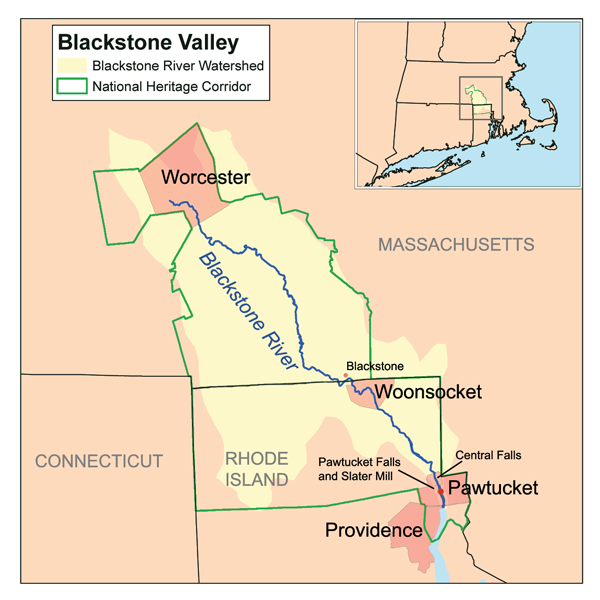

Location
- Country: United States
- State: Massachusetts, Rhode Island
- Region: New England

Physical characteristics
- Source
  - location: Worcester, MA
- Mouth
  - location: Seekonk River, at Pawtucket Falls in Pawtucket, Rhode Island
  - coordinates: 41.8771°N 71.3822°W
- Length: 48 mi (77 km)
- Basin size: 540 sq mi (1,400 km^{2})

The Blackstone River in the United States is a river that flows through Massachusetts and Rhode Island. It is 48 mi (77 km) long with a drainage area of 475 mi2 (1229 km2). It drains into the Seekonk River at Pawtucket, Rhode Island. Its long history of industrial use in the watershed has caused significant pollution, with a 1990 report from the United States Environmental Protection Agency describing it as “the most polluted river in the country because of high concentrations of toxic sediments.”

== Name ==
The original Native American name for the river was the "Kittacuck" which meant "the great tidal river." The Narragansett Indians called it Mishkittacook se'pe meaning the great long wide river. The "Kittacuck" used to be plentiful with salmon and lamprey in pre-colonial and colonial times.

In English, the river is named after William Blackstone (original spelling William Blaxton), who arrived in Weymouth, Massachusetts in 1623 and became the first European settler of present-day Boston in 1625. He relocated to Rhode Island in 1635 and built his home on the river, in what would become Cumberland.

== Course ==
The river is formed in south-central Worcester, Massachusetts, by the confluence of the Middle River and Mill Brook. From there, it follows a rough southeast course past Worcester City and Northbridge. It then flows through Millbury, Sutton, Grafton, Northbridge, Uxbridge, Millville, and Blackstone. It continues into Rhode Island, flowing past Woonsocket, Cumberland, Lincoln, Central Falls, and Pawtucket, where it then reaches Pawtucket Falls. Following this, the river becomes tidal and flows into the Seekonk River just north of Providence. Other tributaries join the Blackstone along the way, such as the West River and Mumford River in Uxbridge, Massachusetts; and the Branch River, in North Smithfield, Rhode Island.

=== Tributaries ===
In addition to many unnamed tributaries, the following brooks and rivers feed the Blackstone:

- Worcester Aqueduct
- Dorothy Brook
- Cronin Brook
- Quinsigamond River
- Mumford River
- West River
- Still Corner Brook
- Emerson Brook
- Bacon Brook
- Aldrich Brook
- Ironstone Brook
- Branch River
- Fox Brook
- Cherry Brook
- Mill River
- Peters River
- Crookfall Brook
- West Sneech Brook
- Monastery Brook
- Abbott Run

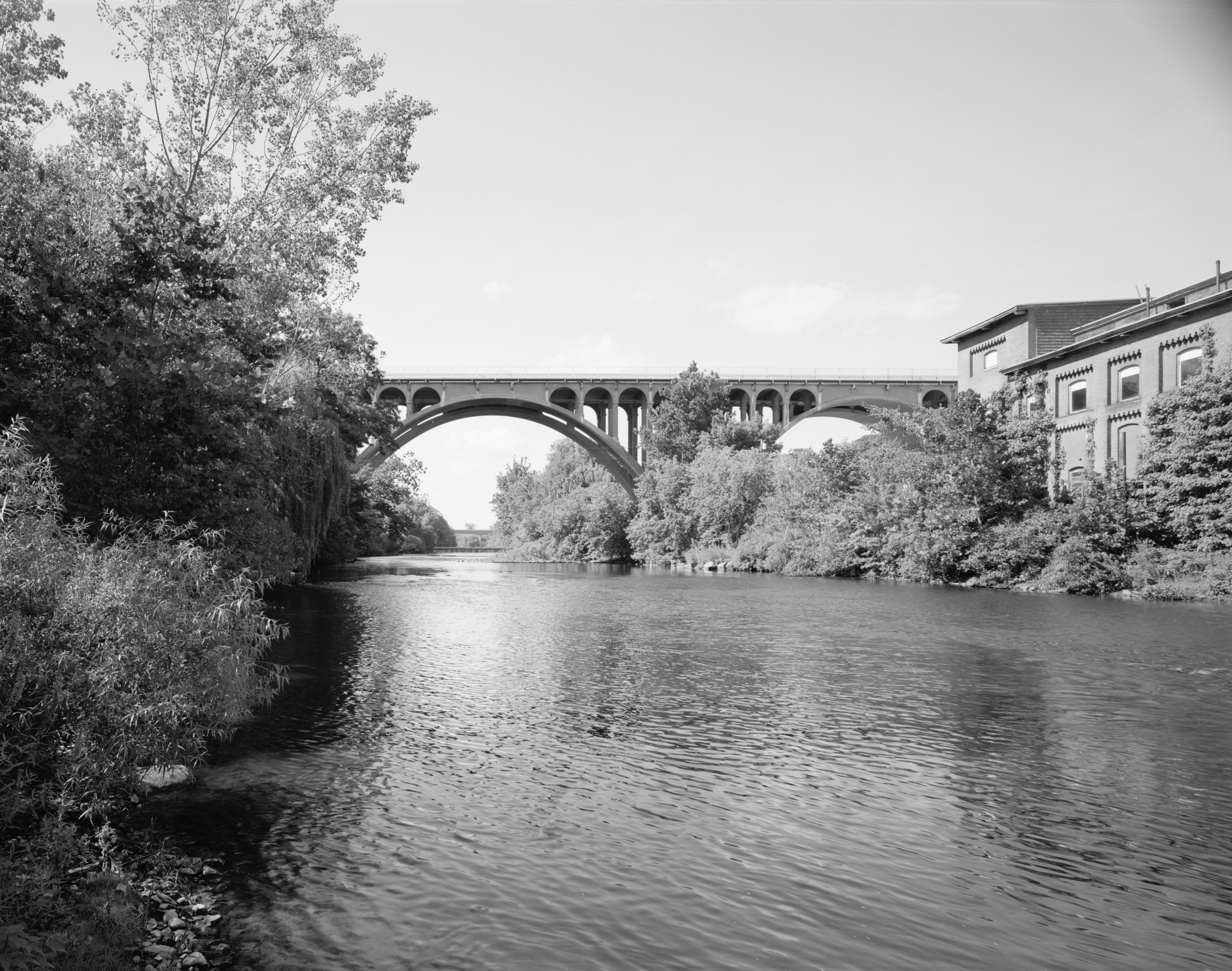
Blackstone River at Ashton, RI (Ashton Viaduct)

== History ==
Along with the Providence River, the Blackstone river served as the north-eastern border of Dutch claims for New Netherland from Adriaen Block's charting of Narragansett Bay in 1614 through the Hartford Treaty of 1650.

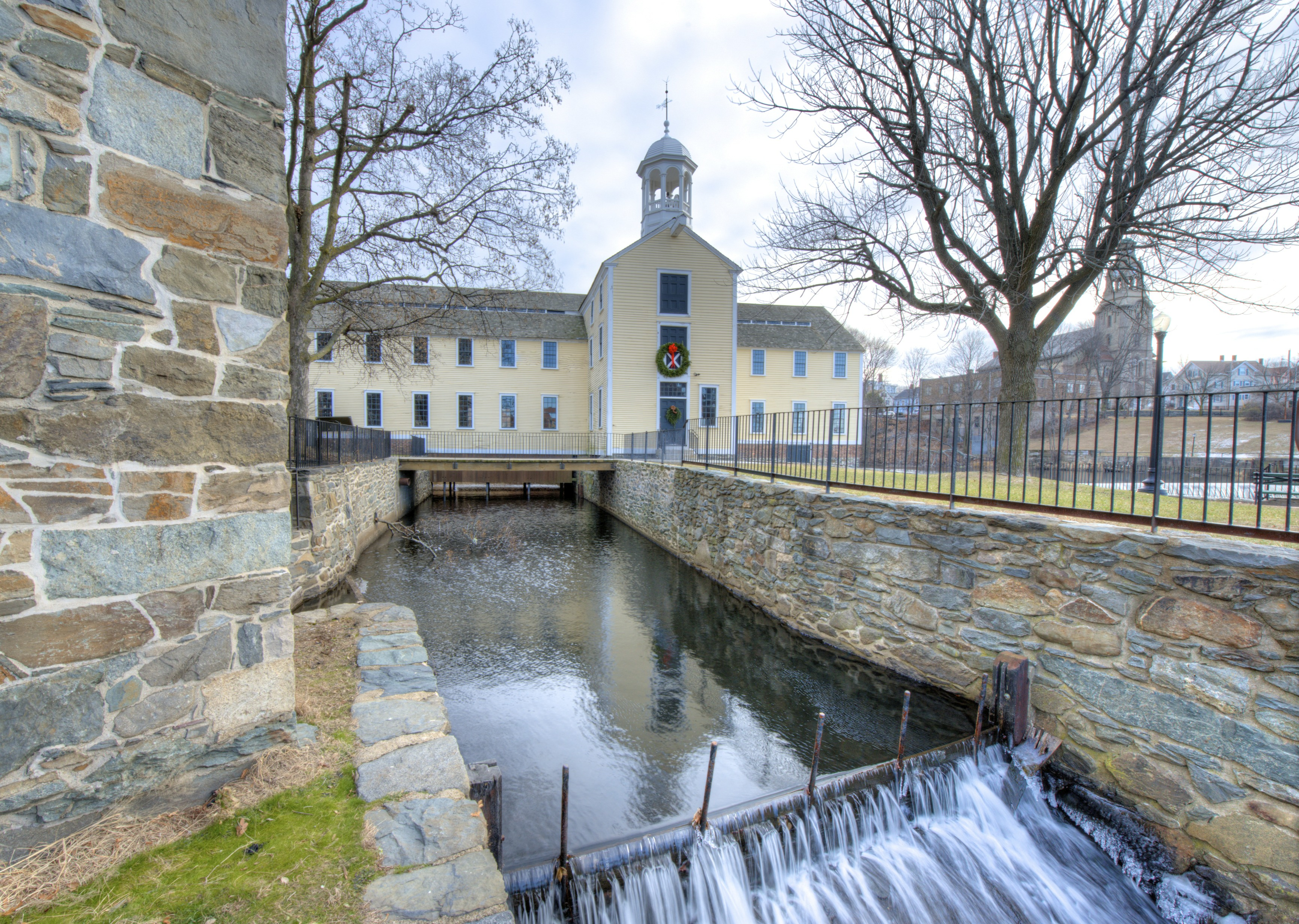
Slater Mill in Pawtucket, along the Blackstone River

In 1790, Samuel Slater opened the first successful water-powered cotton mill in America: Slater Mill, at Pawtucket Falls. This mill was powered by the waters of the Blackstone River. Many other mills appeared along the Blackstone River over time, making it a significant American industrial location and contributing to the river becoming the main cause of the Narragansett Bay pollution by the end of the 20th century.

In August 1955, severe flooding on the Blackstone caused extensive damage to Woonsocket, Rhode Island. Whereas the river is usually 70 ft (21 m) wide, it swelled to over 1 mi (1.6 km) in width. The flooding of the Blackstone was the result of a succession of dam breaks, which were caused by rainfall from Hurricane Connie and Hurricane Diane a week later. In some parts of Rhode Island and Massachusetts, these hurricanes resulted in a combined amount of more than 20 in (510 mm) of rain within a week. This led to the highest water mark on record for the Blackstone river in Woonsocket at 21.8 ft (6.6 m), a full 12.8 feet (3.9 m) above flood stage.

The river, together with the Woonasquatucket River to the south, was designated an American Heritage River in 1998.

== Pollution and remediation efforts ==
The Blackstone River has been significantly impacted by industrial activities and resulting pollution since the 18th century. Early industries discharged a variety of pollutants into the river, including dyes from textile mills, heavy metals and solvents from metal and woodworking industries. Metals are still being measured in sediments near and adjacent to the river.

The inaugural celebration of Earth Day, in 1970, increased public support for remediation projects. While environmental activists in the Blackstone River Valley were already organizing clean-up efforts locally, in 1971, a formalized plea for action was made to the then Governor of Rhode Island, Frank Licht. In December 1971, political support was pledged at the state level. The Blackstone River Watershed Association, which at the time was two years old, was designated to lead the effort. By April 1972, support among the public for cleaning the river increased. Additionally, the 1972 federal Clean Water Act (CWA) was passed by Congress, offering a framework for more protection of the water quality of The Blackstone River. While the CWA did not specifically mention The Blackstone River by name, it stated that the act "establishes the basic structure for regulating discharges of pollutants into the waters of the United States and regulating quality standards for surface waters."

In 1983, EPA identified concerns with impairment of water quality in The Blackstone River and established the Peterson/Puritan Superfund Site

Despite clean up efforts, the effects of industrial wastewater discharge into the river were long-lasting: in 1990, the United States Environmental Protection Agency called the Blackstone "the most polluted river in the country with respect to toxic sediments." A 1990 Massachusetts Department of Public Health report said of the river: "...that the condition of the Blackstone River is offensive throughout its course, from Worcester to the state line at Blackstone. The condition of the stream is likely to grow worse until effective measures are completed for removing from the river much of the pollution which it now receives."

Recent pollution can be partially traced to the Upper Blackstone Water Pollution Abatement District (UBWPAD), the wastewater treatment plant for Worcester, Massachusetts and surrounding communities, which discharges into the Blackstone. A 2005 report written by the Rhode Island Department of Environmental Management said, "... [the] UBWPAD, North Attleboro, and Attleboro WWTFs play a significant role in the ability to improve water quality in the Providence and Seekonk River system [into which the Blackstone discharges], and efforts to reduce their nitrogen inputs should be initiated as soon as possible." In September 2010, the Conservation Law Foundation, citing this report, filed a lawsuit claiming that the discharge permit issued to the UBWPAD by the Environmental Protection Agency was not "sufficient to meet state water quality standards".

River clean-up is ongoing and as of 2010, the Blackstone River was rated as the worst category ("impaired") for all assessed uses ("aquatic life", "fish consumption", "primary contact" (e.g. swimming), "secondary contact" (e.g. boating) and "aesthetics") up to its beginning at Middle River.

Processing problems at the Woonsocket sewage treatment plant and the consequent flow of solid waste into the river prompted no-contact advisories for the Rhode Island portion of the river in 2022.

== See also ==
- Blackstone Valley
- Blackstone River Valley National Historical Park
- Blackstone River and Canal Heritage State Park
- Ten Mile River (Seekonk River)
- List of rivers in Massachusetts
- List of rivers in Rhode Island
- List of most-polluted rivers

== General references ==
- Maps from the United States Geological Survey
