= Greenways Alliance of Rhode Island =

thumn

The Greenways Alliance of Rhode Island was a non-profit organization dedicated to advocacy for Rhode Island's bike paths, trails and greenspaces. It also served as the state committee of the East Coast Greenway. In Spring 2010, GARI merged with the Providence Bicycle Coalition to become the Rhode Island Bicycle Coalition.

The Greenways Alliance of Rhode Island (GARI) communicated with its members and others through its website www.rigreenways.org and a quarterly newsletter called Trail Mix. Although the organization no loner exists, past members continue to author Trail Mix, which is published with a grant from the R.I. Trails Advisory Committee.

The GARI website has changed names to Rhode Island Greenways. It continues to function as an archive of bike paths, hiking trails and other greenways throughout Rhode Island. It also hosts current and archived versions of the Trail Mix newsletter.

== History ==
GARI began in 1992 as the state committee for the East Coast Greenway. In May 2001, GARI began expanding its focus to include advocacy for all bike paths and bike routes, as well as hiking trails. In Fall 2001, the group began publishing a quarterly newsletter called Trail Mix. In Fall 2002, the group registered a unique domain name for its website, www.rigreenways.org, and has built it into a resource where all groups, not just GARI, can post calendar listings and news.

GARI has been active in advocating for bike paths, bike routes and the Safe Routes to Schools program. The organization has attended numerous meetings to speak on its position. A watershed moment involved rallying support before the Narragansett Town Council in 2003 when local opposition seemed to doom an extension of the South County Bike Path. The result of GARI's actions was a larger turnout of Narragansett residents, not just a small group of abutters, who came out to tell town officials they wanted the bike path. Although the process has been lengthy, the Rhode Island Department of Transportation is finalizing construction of the path and opening it to the public in Summer 2011.

GARI over the years has expanded its focus beyond the bike paths that make up segments of the East Coast Greenway in Rhode Island, and advocated for all paths and trails. The group's constituency has expanded to include hikers, walkers, equestrians, mountain bikers and even canoe and kayak users. It coined the phrase "blueways" and now works jointly with ExploreRI.org to help promote these "water trails."

== Event history ==
Each September, GARI hosts R.I. Trails Month.

The summer edition of Trail Mix is dedicated to blueways and a series of guided paddling excursions throughout Rhode Island.

== See also ==
- Blackstone River Bikeway
- East Bay Bike Path
- Washington Secondary Rail Trail
