= Penn Farm =

Penn Farm may refer to:

- Penn Farm Agricultural History Center, in Cedar Hill State Park
- Penn Farm of the Trustees of the New Castle Common, near New Castle, New Castle County, Delaware
- Mulberry Island Plantation, Stoneville, North Carolina
- Chinqua Penn Plantation, Reidsville, North Carolina

== See also ==
- Penn Farms, Pennsylvania
- Penney Farms, Florida
