= Blackstone Viaduct =

- U.S. National Register of Historic Places
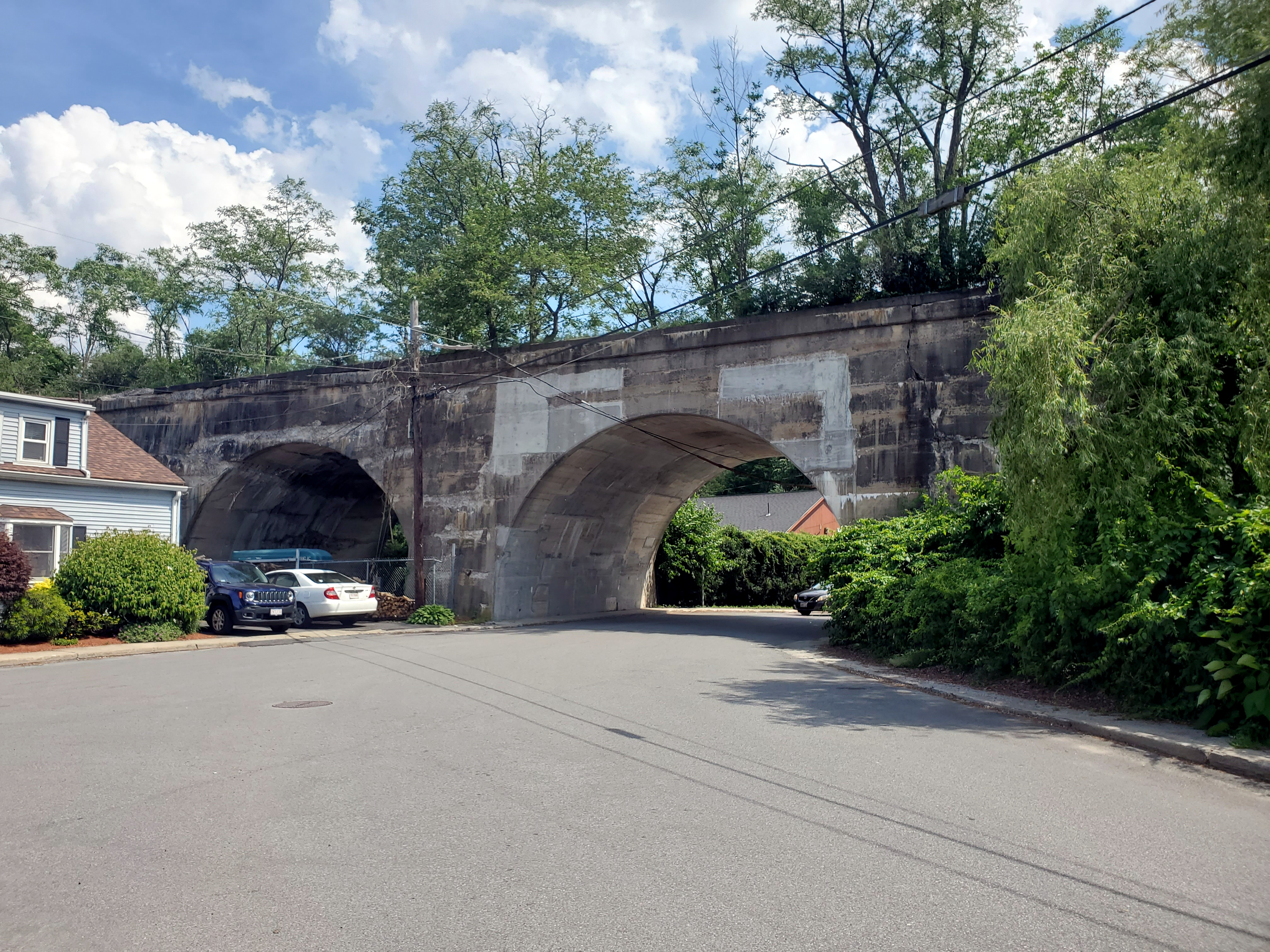
- Part of the Blackstone Viaduct in 2021

- Location within Massachusetts Location within the United States
- Location: Blackstone, Massachusetts
- Coordinates: 42°0′55″N 71°32′0″W
- Area: 2.91 acres (1.18 ha)
- Built: 1872
- Architect: Boston, Hartford & Erie RR; American Bridge Company
- NRHP reference No.: 01001558
- Added to NRHP: February 5, 2002

The Blackstone Viaduct, or the New York & New England Railroad Viaduct is a historic viaduct in Blackstone, Massachusetts. The viaduct was built in 1872 by the Boston, Hartford and Erie Railroad and the American Bridge Company. The viaduct is 1,600 feet (490 m) long structure, consisting of masonry arches and earthen embankments in the Massachusetts portion of the village of Waterford. It runs from the Blackstone River in the east to a still-watered section of the defunct Blackstone Canal to the west. The most prominent portion of the structure is an 800-foot earthen embankment running west from the river that is 25 feet (7.6 m) high, and then a 375-foot (114 m) multiple-arch masonry bridge constructed out of granite which was sheathed in concrete in 1918. The structure was listed on the National Register of Historic Places in 2002.

== History ==
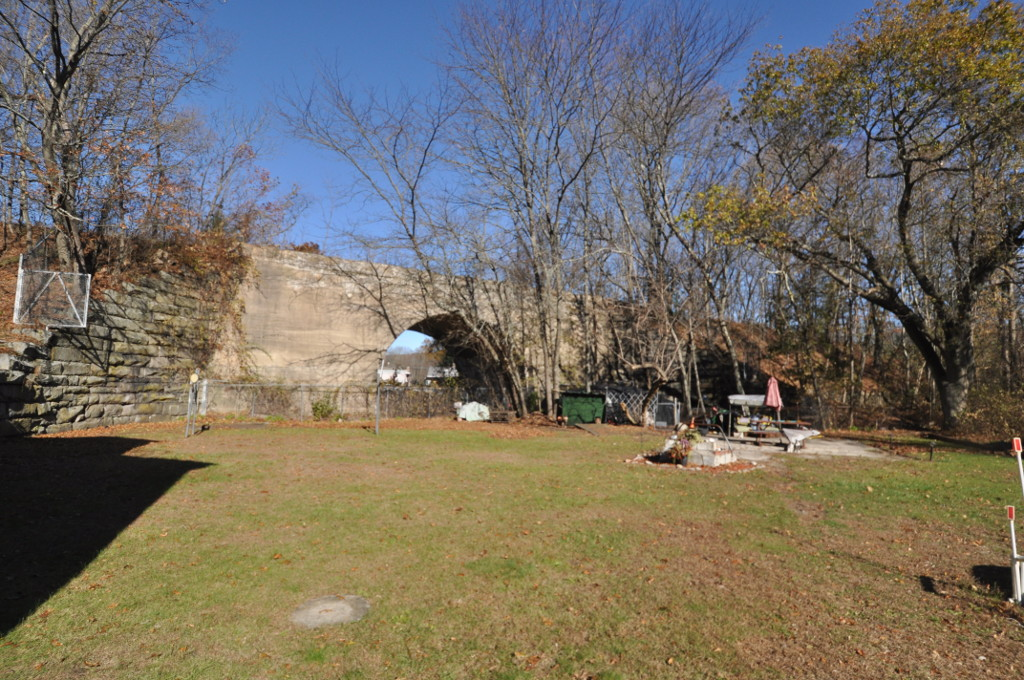
The west arch in 2017

The viaduct was built as part of a project by the Boston, Hartford and Erie (BH&E) to build a complete run between New York City and Boston. The first leg of this route, between Blackstone and Boston, was opened in 1849, and was purchased by the BH&E in 1867. That company completed the connection between Blackstone and New Haven, Connecticut in 1873, part of which included construction of this viaduct, replacing an older wooden trestle. By the early 20th century, some of the viaduct's arches were in deteriorating condition, and were reinforced with concrete in 1918. The bridge over Canal Street was replaced in 1917. The viaduct is one of the largest of the state's 19th-century masonry bridge structures, second in size only to the Canton Viaduct. In the late 1960s, floodwaters washed away an abutment of the adjoining trestle to the east, ending service over the viaduct.

The Massachusetts Department of Conservation and Recreation (DCR) purchased a section of the right-of-way, including the viaduct, in the 1980s for possible conversion to a rail trail. A 2010 DCR study indicated the viaduct was in poor condition and that trail conversion would require it to be removed. However, after local advocacy, a second study in 2015 found that it was sufficiently sound to be restored. A 3.7 miles (6.0 km) segment of trail west of the viaduct opened in 2017 as part of both the Southern New England Trunkline Trail (SNETT), which follows the BH&E, and the Blackstone River Greenway. Restoration work on the Canal Street bridge took place in 2019–2020.

Restoration of the viaduct itself began in 2022. On November 22, 2024, the DCR opened 0.44 miles (0.71 km) of trail from Canal Street over the viaduct and curving south to the Rhode Island line, connecting to an existing portion of trail in Rhode Island. The restoration and trail construction project cost $14 million.

== See also ==
- National Register of Historic Places listings in Worcester County, Massachusetts
