= Blackstone River Greenway =

Partially completed paved rail trail from Worcester, MA, US to Providence, RI, US

Coordinates: 42.026904°N 71.604326°W

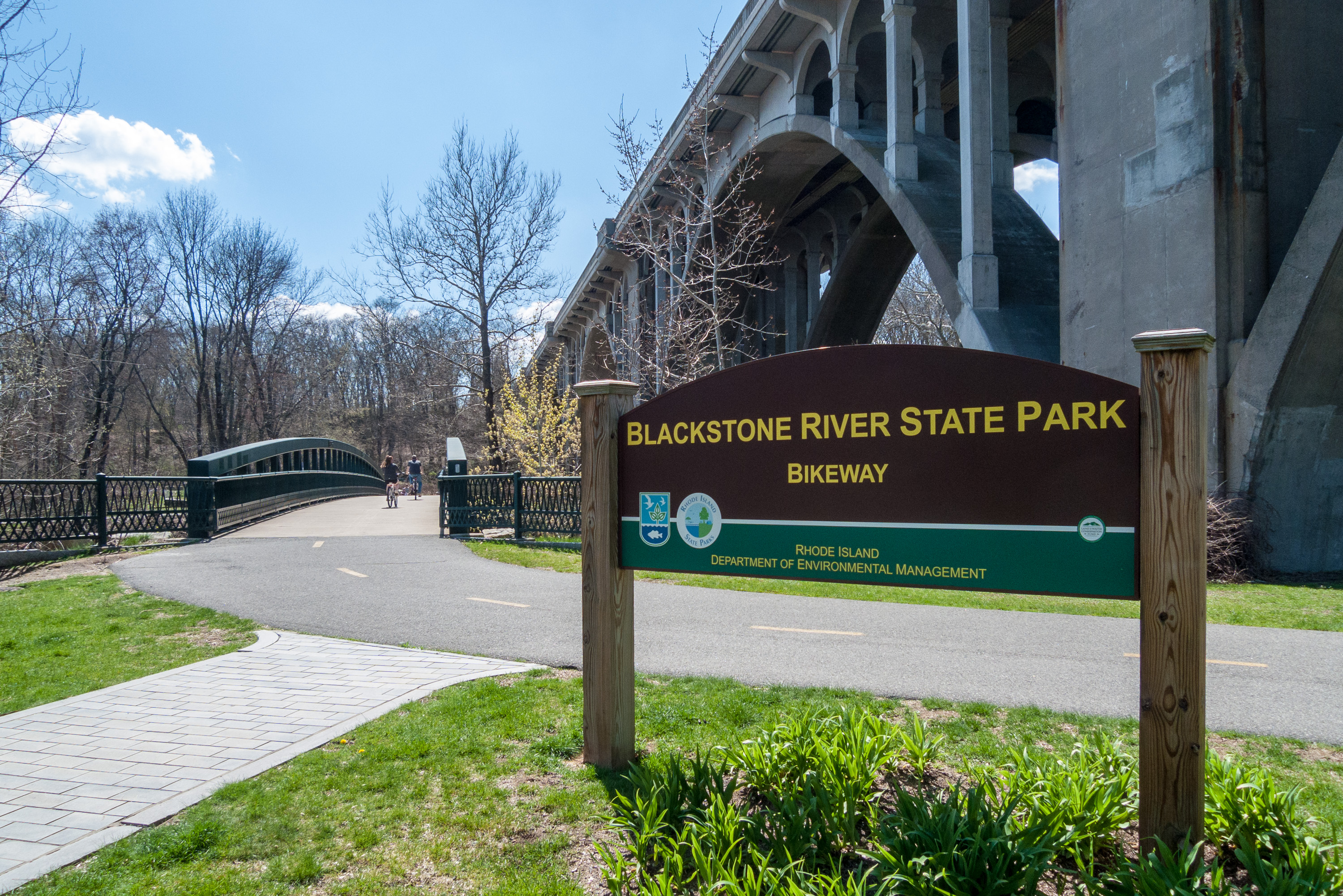
Bikeway and park sign

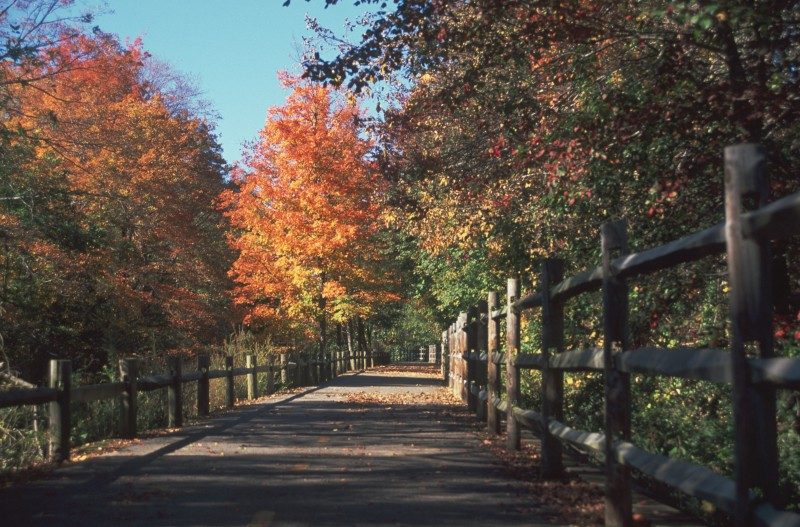
The Blackstone River Greenway in October 2006, approximately one mile south of the Martin Street Bridge, Lincoln, Rhode Island

The Blackstone River Greenway (formerly Bikeway) is a partially completed 48-mile (77 km) paved rail trail defining the course of the East Coast Greenway through the Blackstone Valley from Worcester, Massachusetts to Providence, Rhode Island in the United States.

As of 2016, approximately 11.5 miles (18.5 km) of the trail has been completed in Rhode Island, connecting the communities of Woonsocket, Lincoln, Cumberland, and Manville. Some 2.5 miles (4.0 km) of completed trail in Massachusetts connects Worcester and Millbury, as well as 3.7 miles of trail connecting Uxbridge and Blackstone.

The path roughly parallels the right-of-way of the active Providence & Worcester Railroad and its predecessor, the Blackstone Canal, running alongside the Blackstone River. In some places, the bike path follows the old canal towpath, with the long-abandoned canal running along one side and the river on the other. Only a short portion near Pratt Dam (a.k.a. Lonsdale Dam, connecting Lincoln, Rhode Island and Cumberland, Rhode Island) runs on abandoned railroad right-of-way.

Once finished, the greenway will be linked to the East Bay Bike Path, for an additional 14.5 miles (23.3 km) of trail to Bristol, Rhode Island. The Blackstone River Greenway is also a designated section of the East Coast Greenway, the 3,000-mile trail system connecting cities from Maine to Florida.

== History ==
In 1985, the Blackstone River Valley National Heritage Corridor (known after 1999 as the John H. Chafee Blackstone River Valley National Heritage Corridor) was designated by the United States Congress, following the path of the Blackstone River from Providence to Worcester.

=== Rhode Island ===
In 1997, the Rhode Island Department of Environmental Management and Department of Transportation began work on the first Rhode Island segment, from Lincoln to Ashton. This segment was completed in 1998. A second Rhode Island segment was completed in 2002, from Ashton to Manville. In August 2007, a bridge reconstruction project at Martin Street in Lincoln was completed, ending a three-year bike path closure. The new bridge incorporated a major safety improvement with the path passing underneath Martin Street instead of meeting it at grade. In November 2007, a 2-mile (3.2 km) extension from Manville to the Woonsocket Water Treatment Plant was opened. A 1-mile (1.6 km) segment from Lonsdale to Valley Falls, which includes more than 500 feet (150 m) of boardwalk over part of the Lonsdale Marsh, opened in 2008. A segment through the River's Edge Recreational Complex in Woonsocket was completed in 2008, and that segment was linked to the previously completed portions to the south later that year. In 2011, an 8.5 miles (13.7 km) segment of on-road bicycle lanes opened connecting the Blackstone River Greenway with the East Bay Bike Path, starting in Providence. In 2013, sharrows were painted through Woonsocket from the Massachusetts border to the River's Edge Recreational Complex.

In early Summer 2017, a new 0.6 miles (0.97 km) section of path was completed along the Seekonk River in Providence, stretching from Gano Street to Pitman Street, which was extended by a further 0.2 miles (0.32 km) in 2020. A $4.5 million section of path in Woonsocket known as Segment 8C was completed in 2019, consisting of 0.6 miles (0.97 km) of path from the Massachusetts border to Cold Spring Park in Woonsocket including a 182-foot truss bridge over the Blackstone River. Segment 8B1, a further 0.6 miles (0.97 km) of path along Truman Drive in Woonsocket, was opened in 2020. As of 2021 the total Rhode Island portion of the greenway is 12 miles (19 km) long, 10 miles (16 km) of which make up the longest contiguous segment. Additional projects are under design to extend the path further through Woonsocket, connecting existing segments, as well as through the cities of Providence, Pawtucket, and Central Falls.

=== Massachusetts ===
In 1996, a study undertaken by the Massachusetts Highway Department (MHD) and the Massachusetts Department of Conservation and Recreation (known at the time as the Department of Environmental Management) produced a plan for seven segments of trail linking Worcester with Blackstone, Massachusetts and the Rhode Island border.

1. Blackstone to Millville: 2.92 miles (4.70 km)
2. Millville to Uxbridge: 3.30 miles (5.31 km)
3. Uxbridge to Northbridge: 9.09 miles (14.63 km)
4. Northbridge to Grafton: 1.39 miles (2.24 km)
5. Grafton to Millbury via Sutton: 6.02 miles (9.69 km)
6. Millbury to Worcester: over 4 miles (6.4 km)
7. Worcester: 2.61 miles (4.20 km)

Construction was delayed due to a lack of state funds, a shortfall attributed to the over-budget Big Dig highway tunnel project in Boston. In 2005, as part of the Massachusetts Turnpike-Route 146 interchange project, the first 2.5-mile (4.0 km) segment from Worcester to Millbury was opened to the public.

In 2010, an agreement was reached between MassDOT and DCR for DCR to take over the management of the design and environmental permitting of Sections 1 through 5 of the Greenway, including preparation of the Environmental Impact Report (EIR). Section 6 was previously constructed by MassDOT, and Section 7 will be designed by the City of Worcester and constructed by MassDOT.

In 2013, five bridges in Blackstone that run concurrently with the Southern New England Trunkline Trail (SNETT) were repaired and repainted. These are the two Factory Pond Bridges, the northern Canal Street Bridge, a Blackstone River Bridge, and the St. Paul Street Bridge. By September 2014, these bridges received new ipe wood decks and safety railings. In 2014, new bridges were also constructed over Kane Court and Main Street, and a tunnel was built under Church Street, all in the town of Blackstone. The entire 3.7-mile path was finally completed in December 2016. Restoration work on the Blackstone Viaduct, located adjacent to the southern terminus of this path, began in 2019. Completed in 2024, the project added approximately 0.5 miles of bike path extending to the Rhode Island border, where it connected with an existing segment of path in Woonsocket.

The portion between the east end of the Blackstone Viaduct and Route 146A in Uxbridge is part of both the SNETT and the Blackstone River Greenway.

== Crossings ==
State	County	Town	Crossing	Notes
Massachusetts	Worcester	Worcester	McKeon Road	Current northern terminus
Massachusetts	Worcester	Worcester	Blackstone River Road	Underpass
Massachusetts	Worcester	Worcester	Route 146 / Route 122A	Freeway underpass (twice in a row)
Massachusetts	Worcester	Millbury	US 20	Underpass
Massachusetts	Worcester	Millbury	Route 146 exit 18 ramps	Underpass
Massachusetts	Worcester	Millbury	I-90 (Massachusetts Turnpike)	Underpass
Massachusetts	Worcester	Millbury	Route 122A	Underpass/overlap
Massachusetts	Worcester	Millbury	Route 146	Overpass
Massachusetts	Worcester	Millbury	Route 146 exit 17 ramp	
Massachusetts	Worcester	Millbury	Route 122A	Path terminus
Massachusetts	Worcester	Break in Trail		
Massachusetts	Worcester	Uxbridge	Adams Lane	Path terminus
Massachusetts	Worcester	Millville	Central Street	
Massachusetts	Worcester	Millville	Blackstone River	River crossing
Massachusetts	Worcester	Blackstone	Route 122	Underpass
Massachusetts	Worcester	Blackstone	Blackstone River	River crossing (Twice in a row)
Massachusetts	Worcester	Blackstone	Church Street	Underpass
Massachusetts	Worcester	Blackstone	Route 122	Overpass
Massachusetts	Worcester	Blackstone	Canal Street	Overpass
Massachusetts	Worcester	Blackstone	Blackstone River	River crossing
Massachusetts	Worcester	Blackstone	Saint Paul Street	Overpass
Massachusetts	Worcester	Blackstone	Canal Street	Overpass
Massachusetts	Worcester	Blackstone	Farnum Street	Overpass
Rhode Island	Providence			
Rhode Island	Providence	North Smithfield–Woonsocket	Blackstone River	River crossing
Rhode Island	Providence	Woonsocket	Singleton St	
Rhode Island	Providence	Woonsocket	Break in Trail	
Rhode Island	Providence	Woonsocket	River Street	Path terminus
Rhode Island	Providence	Woonsocket	Main Street	
Rhode Island	Providence	Woonsocket	Truman Drive	
Rhode Island	Providence	Woonsocket	Court Street	Underpass
Rhode Island	Providence	Woonsocket	Truman Drive	Path terminus
Rhode Island	Providence	Woonsocket	Break in Trail	
Rhode Island	Providence	Woonsocket	Rec Drive	Twice in a row; Path terminus
Rhode Island	Providence	Woonsocket	Private Drive	
Rhode Island	Providence	Lincoln	Route 99	Freeway underpass
Rhode Island	Providence	Lincoln	Main Street	Underpass
Rhode Island	Providence	Lincoln	School Street	
Rhode Island	Providence	Lincoln–Cumberland	Blackstone River	River crossing
Rhode Island	Providence	Cumberland	Providence and Worcester Railroad	Railroad crossing
Rhode Island	Providence	Cumberland	I-295	Freeway underpass
Rhode Island	Providence	Cumberland	Route 116	Underpass
Rhode Island	Providence	Cumberland	Front Street	
Rhode Island	Providence	Lincoln–Cumberland	Blackstone River	River crossing
Rhode Island	Providence	Lincoln	Martin Street	Underpass
Rhode Island	Providence	Lincoln–Cumberland	Blackstone River	River crossing
Rhode Island	Providence	Cumberland	Route 122	Overlap
Rhode Island	Providence	Lincoln–Cumberland	Blackstone River	River crossing
Rhode Island	Providence	Lincoln	Route 123	overlap
Rhode Island	Providence	Lincoln–Cumberland	Blackstone River	River crossing
Rhode Island	Providence	Cumberland	Jones Street	Path terminus
Rhode Island	Providence	Break in Trail		
Rhode Island	Providence	Providence	Pitman Street	Path terminus
Rhode Island	Providence	Providence	I-195 exit 1D ramp	
Rhode Island	Providence	Providence	Portugal Parkway	Southern terminus

== See also ==
- Southern New England Trunkline Trail
- East Bay Bike Path
- Washington Secondary Rail Trail
- Greenways Alliance of Rhode Island
