= Moosup Valley State Park Trail =

Rail trail in Connecticut, United States

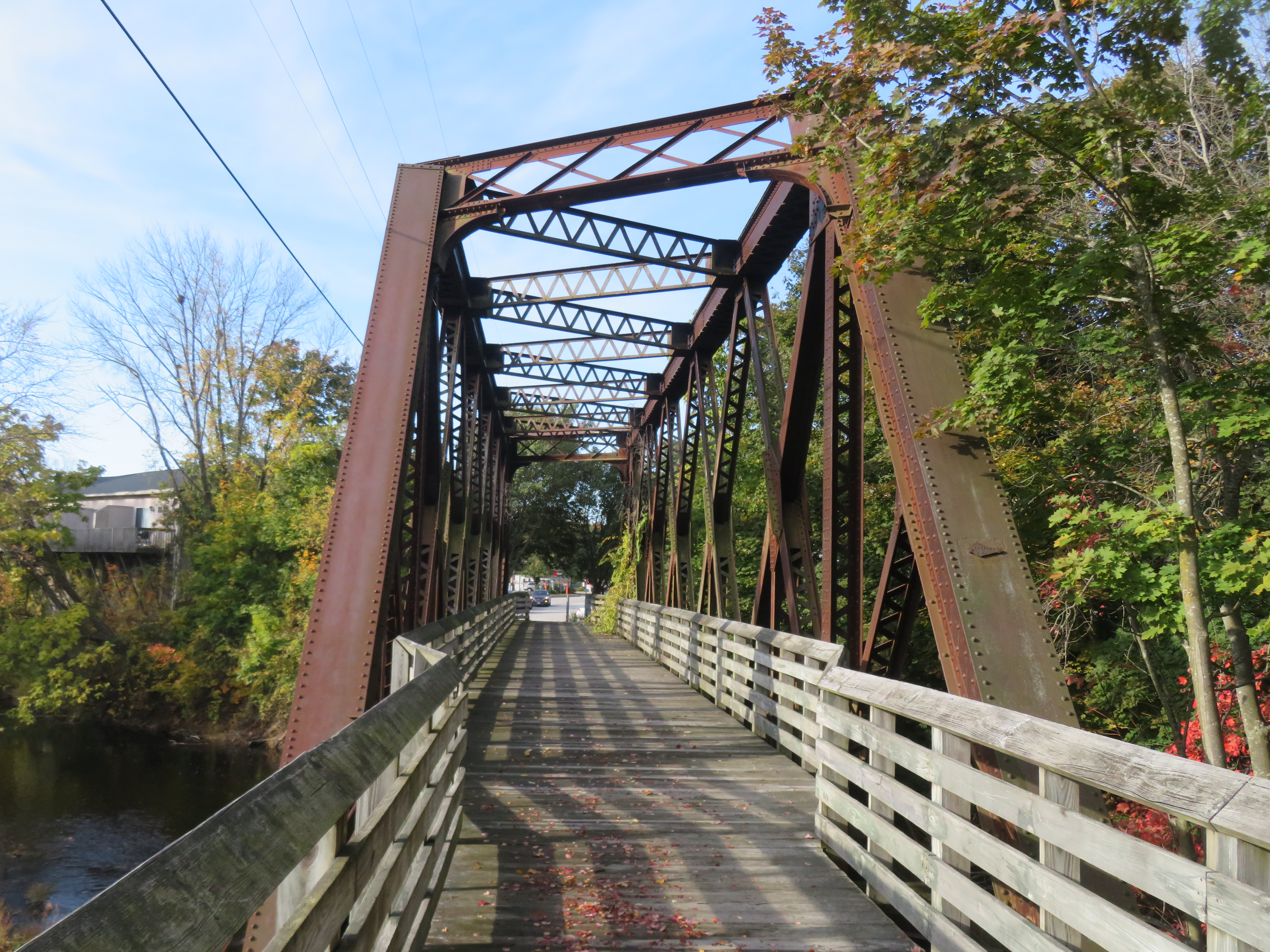
- Bridge at the west end of the trail in Moosup
- Length: 5.8 miles (9.3 km)
- Location: Plainfield & Sterling, Connecticut
- Established: 1987
- Designation: Connecticut state park
- Trailheads: Moosup (41°42′47″N 71°52′52″W); State line in Sterling (41°41′44″N 71°47′19″W)
- Use: Hiking, biking, horseback riding, cross-country skiing
- Sights: Woodlands, Moosup River
- Surface: Various: dirt with some grass, sand and gravel; old railroad ballast
- Maintained by: Connecticut Department of Energy and Environmental Protection
- Website: Moosup Valley State Park Trail

The Moosup Valley State Park Trail is a rail trail located on the railbed of a former New York, New Haven and Hartford Railroad line in the New England towns of Plainfield and Sterling in Windham County, Connecticut. The line ran from 1898 until 1968. The rail line was abandoned in the late 1960s, and was designated by the state as a multi-use trail in 1987. The trail is owned and operated by the Connecticut Department of Energy and Environmental Protection.

It runs for approximately 6 miles (9.7 km) from Main Street in the center of the village of Moosup to the Rhode Island state line in the town of Sterling, where the trail continues into Rhode Island as the Coventry Greenway. The Moosup Valley Trail, together with the Quinebaug River Trail and the Air Line Trail, is "a critical link" in the Hartford to Providence section of the planned East Coast Greenway.

== Crossings ==
| Town | Carrying | Notes | Coordinates |
|---|---|---|---|
| Plainfield | Route 14 | parking area/ terminus | 41.7129°N 71.8812°W |
| Plainfield | Moosup River | river crossing | 41.7135°N 71.8800°W |
| Plainfield | River Street | | 41.7141°N 71.8790°W |
| Plainfield | Barber Hill Road | | 41.7171°N 71.8686°W |
| Plainfield | Brunswick Avenue | | 41.7165°N 71.8608°W |
| Plainfield | Route 14 | overpass | 41.7194°N 71.8587°W |
| Sterling | Moosup River | | 41.7127°N 71.8364°W |
| Sterling | Main Street | | 41.7101°N 71.8316°W |
| Sterling | Industrial Park Road | | 41.7091°N 71.8293°W |
| Sterling | Route 14 | | 41.7069°N 71.8257°W |
| Sterling | Providence Road | underpass | 41.6978°N 71.8093°W |
| Sterling | Spring Lake Road | | 41.6968°N 71.8003°W |
| Sterling | Route 14A | | 41.6967°N 71.7983°W |
| Sterling/ Coventry | CT/ RI State Border | terminus | 41.6956°N 71.7887°W |
