= South Tar River Greenway =

- Length: 3.1 miles
- Location: Greenville, North Carolina
- Trailheads: Town Common/Greensprings Park
- Use: Hiking, Running, Biking
- Season: Year-round
- Sights: Tar River
- Surface: Asphalt

The South Tar River Greenway is a 3.1 miles (5.0 km) greenway located in Greenville, North Carolina. The northwest terminus trailhead is located at the Town Common. The trail goes east and follows the southern bank of the Tar River, then at the confluence of the Tar River and Green Mill Run, turns south and follows the western edge of the tributary. The southeast terminus trailhead is located at Greensprings Park. This greenway is the second in the city, after the 1.5 miles (2.4 km) Green Mill Run Greenway. The $1,488,000 project is funded from the Federal Highway Administration budget through its inclusion in the Federal FY2005 Appropriations Act.

== Completed sections ==
=== Phase I ===
Phase I was approved on December 8, 2008 by the Greenville City Council. Groundbreaking occurred on December 12, 2008 and it opened to the public on December 4, 2009. The 1 mile (1.6 km) greenway segment begins at the Town Common and follows the Tar River to North Warren Street, at the Off Leash Dog Park. It created a 530 feet (160 m) long 10 feet (3.0 m) wide asphalt trail from North Holly Street to North Jarvis Street. It then uses the sidewalk on Willow Street for one block. It continues as a 10 feet (3.0 m) wide greenway for 2,640 feet (800 m) from North Woodlawn Street to North Warren Street. The expenditure for this phase was $404,069.73.

=== Phase II ===
Phase II groundbreaking occurred in July 2010 and it officially opened to the public on June 11, 2011. The northwest terminus of the 2.1 miles (3.4 km) segment is located at the Dog Park at North Warren Street, which is the terminus of Phase I. It continues eastward along the southern bank of the Tar River to the confluence of the Tar River and Green Mill Run. Known as Lookout Point, this an area on the bank to view the Tar River and Green Mill Run. It then turns in a southerly direction alongside the western bank of Green Mill Run. It crosses over East Fifth Street and the southeastern trailhead is located in Greensprings Park. Phase II intersects with Green Mill Run Greenway.

== Future ==
=== Phase III ===
Phase III of the project is to begin in August 2011. The new section will start at the Town Common and follow a westward track to First Street Place apartment complex. Construction of this $125,000 phase should conclude in September 2011.

On August 11, 2011, United States Secretary of Transportation Ray LaHood and Senator Kay Hagan announced Greenville will receive $907,609 to design and construct the next phase of the greenway. This phase will connect Phase III to Moye Boulevard at Pitt County Memorial Hospital and The Brody School of Medicine. The 2.4 miles (3.9 km) extension give an alternative route to reach the cities two largest employers, East Carolina University and Pitt County Memorial Hospital, by alternative transportation. This phase will also be the first section located in West Greenville. Design should take approximately eight months, with construction beginning in 2012.

It is also proposed that the greenway will extend eastward to Eastside Park. This phase western terminus will be around Lookout Point. The 2.4 miles (3.9 km) greenway extension will also connect the eastern Greenville neighborhoods and student apartments to the greenway system. Once this phase is completed, this greenway will be over 10 miles (16 km) long and stretch across Greenville.

It will be part of the proposed Washington-Greenville Greenway, that will connect the waterfront in Washington to the South Tar River Greenway.

The greenway will also be part of the Historic Coastal route, an alternative route on the East Coast Greenway (ECG). The Historic Coastal route will connect the Tidewater region of Virginia to Elizabeth City and Greenville, then to New Bern and Jacksonville, until it rejoins the spine in Wilmington.

== Beech Street Greenway ==
The Beech Street Greenway, also known as the Beech Street Connector, connects the South Tar River Greenway directly to Greensprings Park. The 0.6 miles (0.97 km) segment cuts off the eastern portion of the South Tar River Greenway. The greenway's name comes from Beech Street, the terminal street used to connect the endpoints.
