= Southern New England Railway =

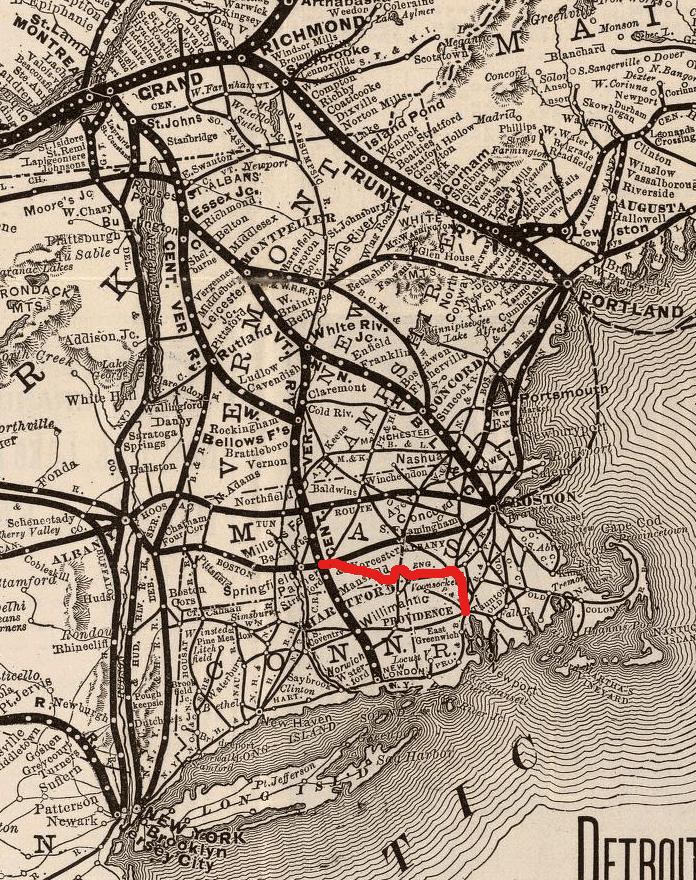
Map of the planned route

The Southern New England Railway was a project of the Grand Trunk Railway (GT) to build a railroad from the GT-owned Central Vermont Railway at Palmer, Massachusetts south and east to the all-weather port of Providence, Rhode Island. Much grading and construction, including many large concrete supports, was carried out, but the project was not completed.

== History ==
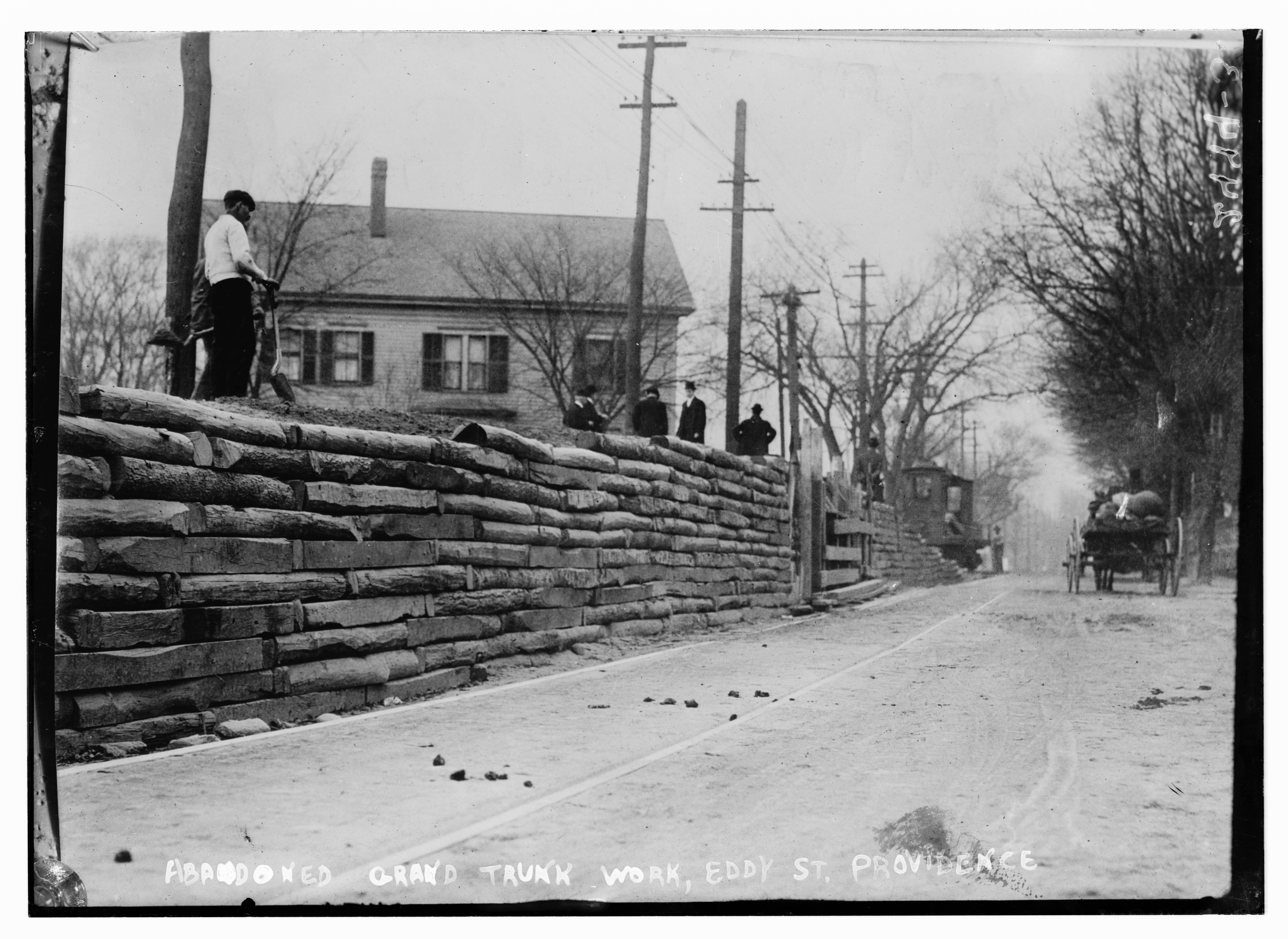
Abandoned work along Eddy Street in Providence

The railroad, conceived by GTR president Charles Melville Hays to break the near-monopoly of the New Haven Railroad in southern New England, was chartered in April 1910, and was to be built as a completely grade-separated air line, having low grades and long high bridges over valleys.

Hays went down with the RMS Titanic in April 1912; nevertheless, construction on the SNE commenced at full speed in May. However, all work stopped in November 1912, ostensibly due to an inability of worldwide bond markets to finance further GT expansion, although pressure from the New Haven, at the time closely allied with financier J. Pierpont Morgan, was widely suspected. Construction soon resumed in Massachusetts so that contractor John Marsch, who threatened litigation against the GT for breach of contract, could be paid for the work. However, construction in Rhode Island, for which a different contractor was responsible, did not restart. By 1916 almost all the grading and concrete work in Massachusetts was completed, although no steelwork other than on highway overpasses was ever erected. World War I was seen as only a temporary financial setback to construction, which, however, never resumed.

Several reasons have been given for the abandonment of the SNE project in addition to the war: bankruptcy of the GT due to overexpansion by subsidiary Grand Trunk Pacific; a desire by the reorganized railroad (Canadian National Railways) to concentrate on serving Canadian ports with existing lines rather than building new ones in the U.S.; the existence of an all-weather port in southern New England (New London) already served by the Central Vermont; the Federal control of American railroads between 1917 and 1920 and its disruptive aftermath; and the increasing influence of the motor truck and automobile (passenger service on the SNE had been contemplated along with freight).

Attempts were made throughout the 1920s, and into the early 1930s by politicians and businessmen, mostly from Rhode Island, to restart the work and to get the line completed as a way to break the New Haven's stranglehold on freight traffic in Rhode Island, but the Great Depression finally put an end to their efforts. Some concrete abutments were removed for highway projects starting as early as 1929, and several washouts later compromised the right-of-way, particularly during hurricanes in 1938 and in 1955.

== Route and infrastructure ==
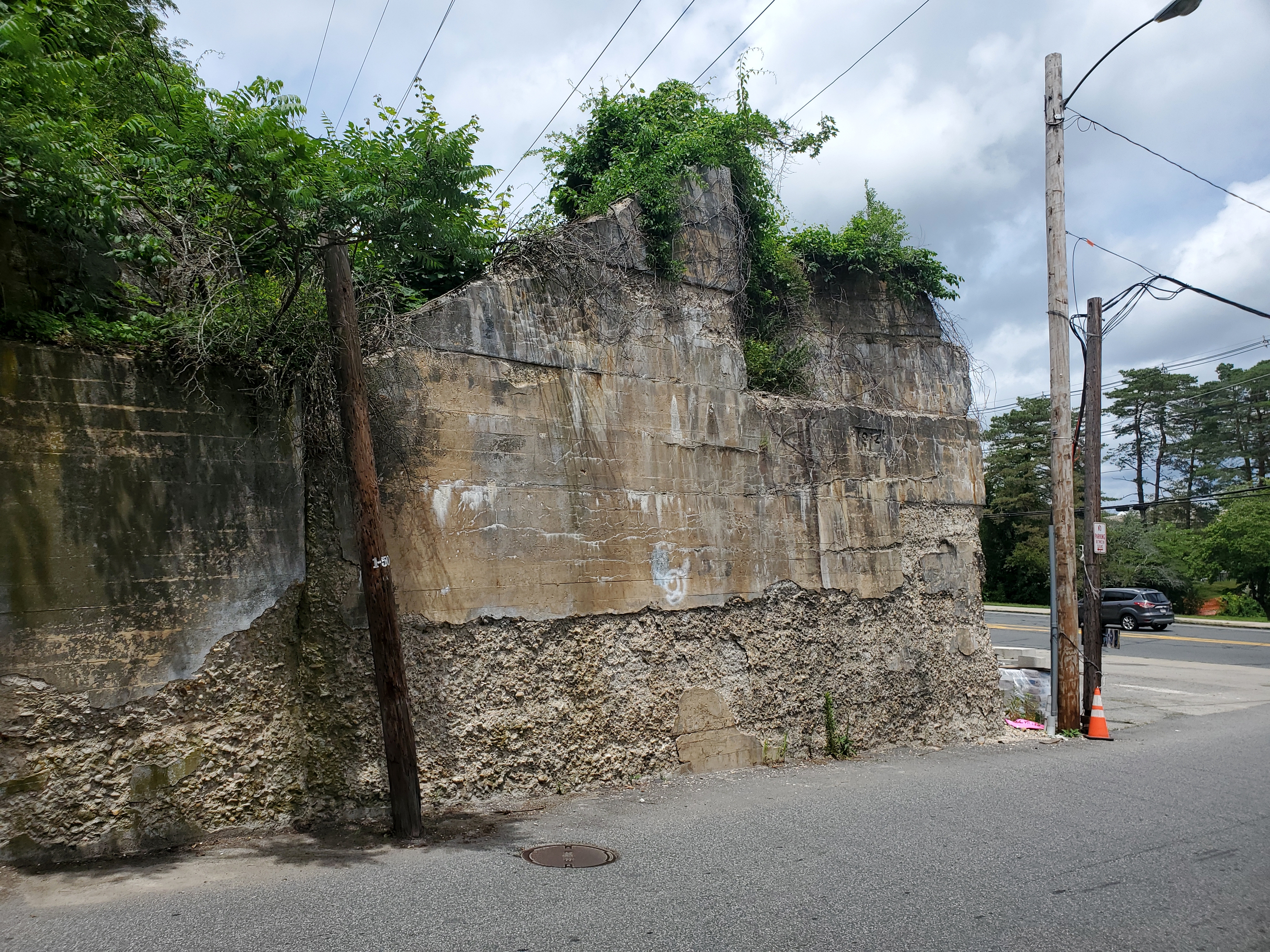
An abandoned bridge pier in Southbridge, Massachusetts

The construction of the SNE's gently graded "air line" had its geographical costs in high fills, long trestles, and sharp curves. Also of crucial importance to the Grand Trunk was avoiding Connecticut. The company purposely had not sought a charter to build through the home state of the rival New Haven, which Charles M. Hays assumed would mount significant opposition to the SNE in the Connecticut legislature.

In climbing out of Palmer, the SNE would have crossed over the Boston and Albany Railroad twice (in addition to the CV's diamond crossing of the B&A at Palmer, still in use today). The second crossing would have been a spectacular, tall steel trestle on a hairpin turn over the B&A and the Quaboag Valley.

In Millville, Massachusetts, the SNE would have passed over the Blackstone River on another (straighter) high-level bridge, with both the New York and New England Railroad (now abandoned) and the Providence and Worcester Railroad (still in use) below. Several full-height supports were built as well as several partial supports in the river.

The two above trestles were built for steel; however, one major trestle was made of wood and was actually built: a 1,000-foot long, 55-foot tall "beanpole" trestle over the French River and the New Haven-controlled Norwich and Worcester Railroad. For reasons of cost, the trestle was intended to be permanent. Typical of railroad construction at the time, the SNE also built many semi-permanent wooden trestles, around which fill would be dumped to create embankments. The main route would have gone through Woonsocket, Rhode Island to downtown Providence, with a branch around the west side to the docks south of downtown. The former route, leading into Providence Union Station, was planned to pass through a tunnel under Smith Hill, on which little if any construction was undertaken before cessation of work in Rhode Island.

Some of the plans included a branch to Boston or a separate route to Boston from the Central Vermont, but they never reached the construction stage.

== Current status ==
Most of the grade is overgrown, rock cuts flooded, and embankments quarried out for their gravel. Many sections have passed into private ownership and have been built over by modern developments. Many of the old concrete bridge abutments are still visible.

Two sections of the right-of-way have been improved as a public trails open to non-motorized vehicles. The longest is a five-mile section in Sturbridge that is in the Westville Lake recreation area, it can be accessed at Westville Dam, Wallace Road, and River Street. The other 2-3/4 mile long section named the Grand Trunk Trail is in the Douglas State Forest, it crosses SW Main Street, the Streeter Trail, the Midstate Trail, Wallum Lake Road and the Southern New England Trunkline Trail.

The Southern New England Trunkline Trail follows not the path of the SNE, but rather the abandoned right-of-way of the New York and New England Railroad. The two lines were largely parallel between Douglas and Blackstone.
