= Penn Farm of the Trustees of the New Castle Common =

- U.S. National Register of Historic Places
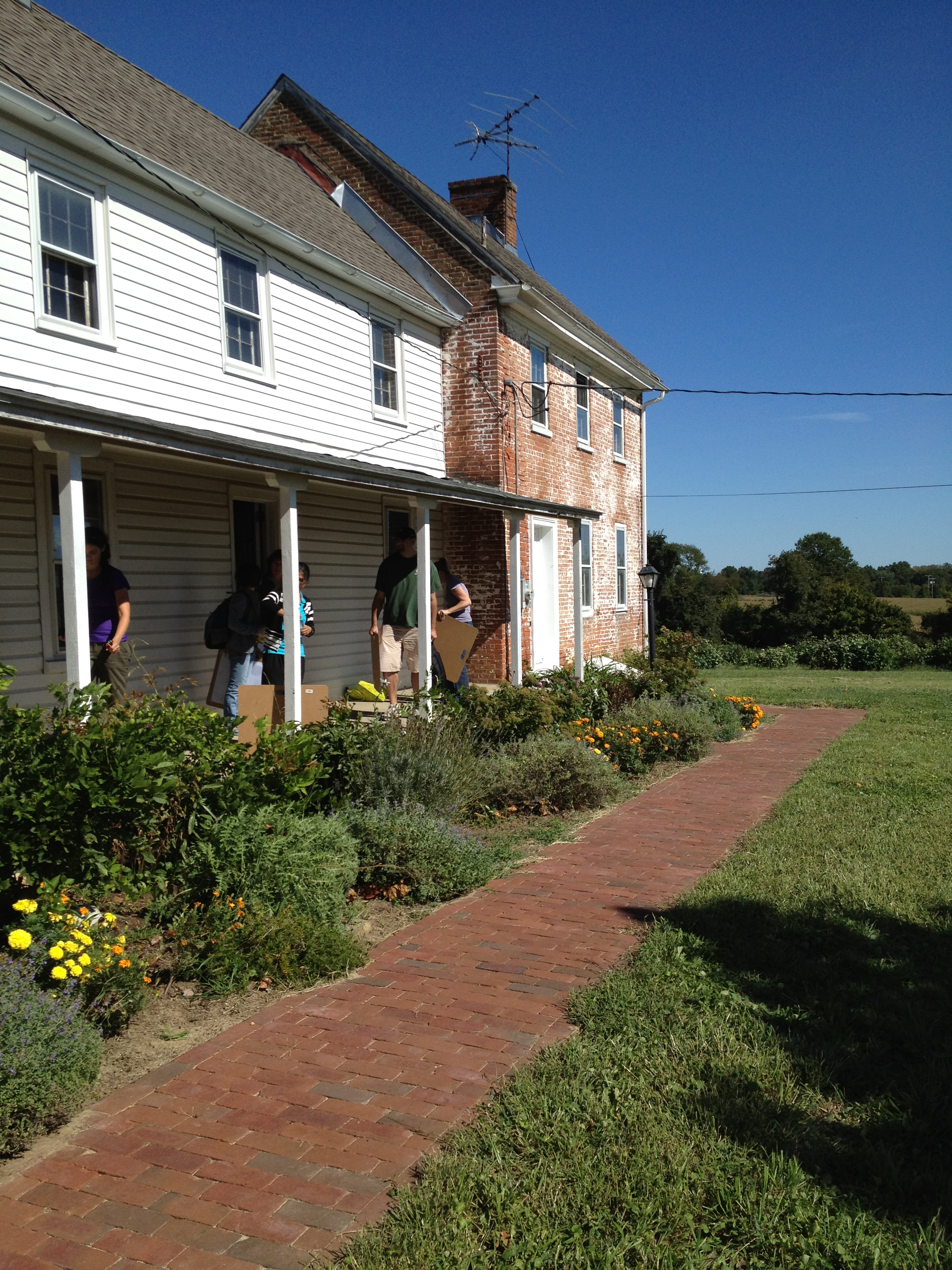

- Location within Delaware Location within the United States
- Location: 807 Frenchtown Road, New Castle, Delaware
- Coordinates: 39°40′01″N 75°35′33″W
- Area: 108 acres (44 ha)
- Built: c. 1804
- Architectural style: Federal
- NRHP reference No.: 97001120
- Added to NRHP: September 11, 1997

Penn Farm of the Trustees of the New Castle Common also known as Penn Farm and Farm No. 7, is a historic farm complex located near New Castle, New Castle County, Delaware. The complex includes a farmhouse, bank barn, granary, milk house, carriage shed, tenant shack, garage, chicken house, and vegetable stand. The farmhouse was built about 1804, and consists of a two-story, three-bay brick section; a two-story, four-bay frame section; and a one-story frame shed.

It was added to the National Register of Historic Places in 1997.

The Penn Farm Trail is a part of the East Coast Greenway.
