= East Coast Greenway =

Long-distance hiking trail in the United States

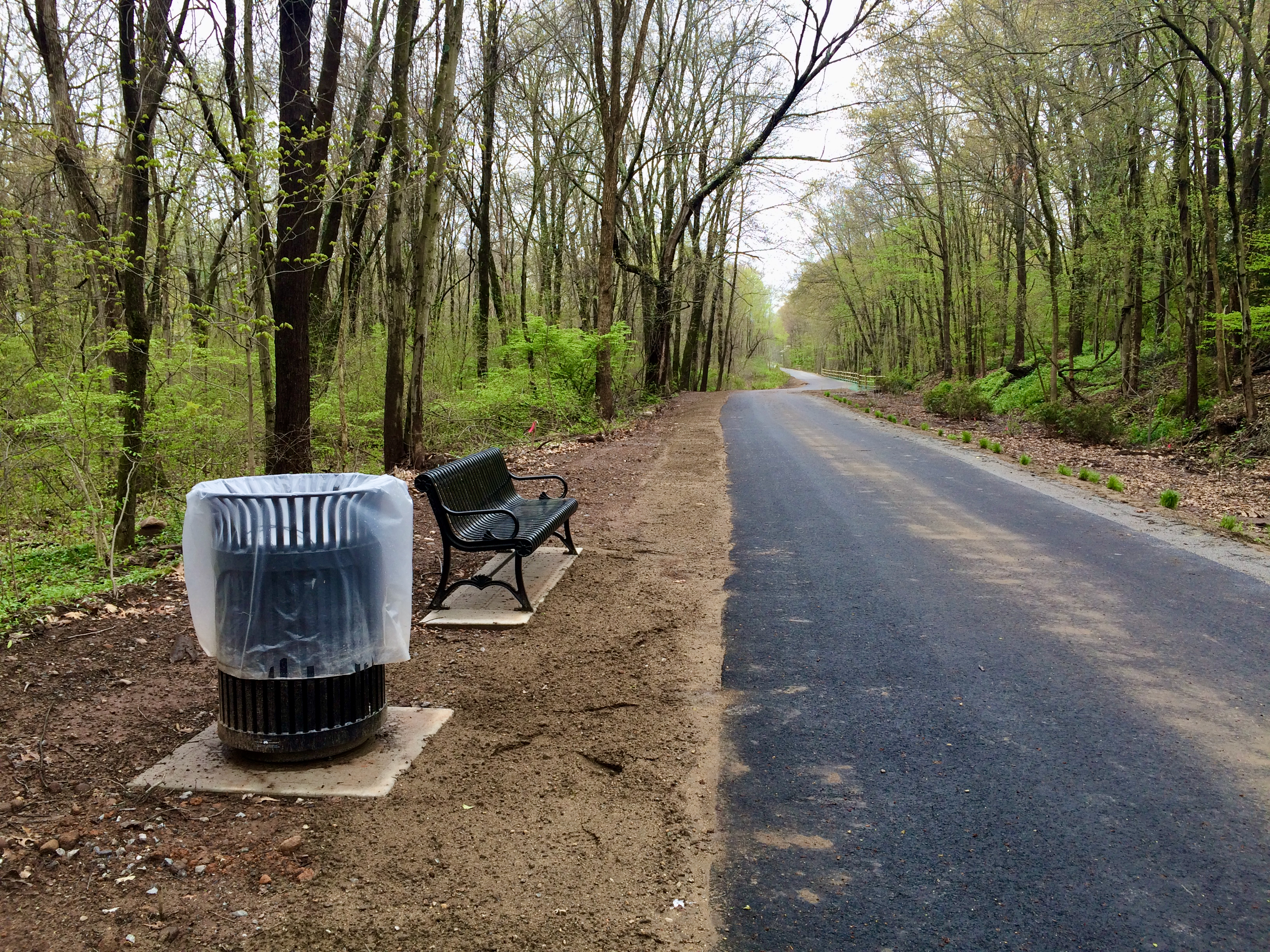
- Part of the greenway in Connecticut
- Length: 3,000 miles (4,800 km)
- Designation: NC State Trail (2021)
- Trailheads: Maine/Canada–US border-Florida
- Use: Multi-use, non-motorized
- Highest point: West Boylston, Massachusetts, U.S., 680 ft (210 m)
- Lowest point: Many locations within 10 feet (3.0 m) or less of sea level
- Season: Variable, depending on latitude
- Hazards: Weather, tick-borne diseases, poison ivy
- Website: www.greenway.org

The East Coast Greenway is a 3,000-mile (4,800 km) pedestrian and bicycle route between Maine and Florida along the East Coast of the United States. The nonprofit East Coast Greenway Alliance was founded in 1991 with the goal to use the entire route with off-road, shared-use paths; as of 2026, more than 1,100 mi (1,800 km) of the route (nearly 40%) meets these criteria. The Greenway receives over 50 million annual visits.

== History ==
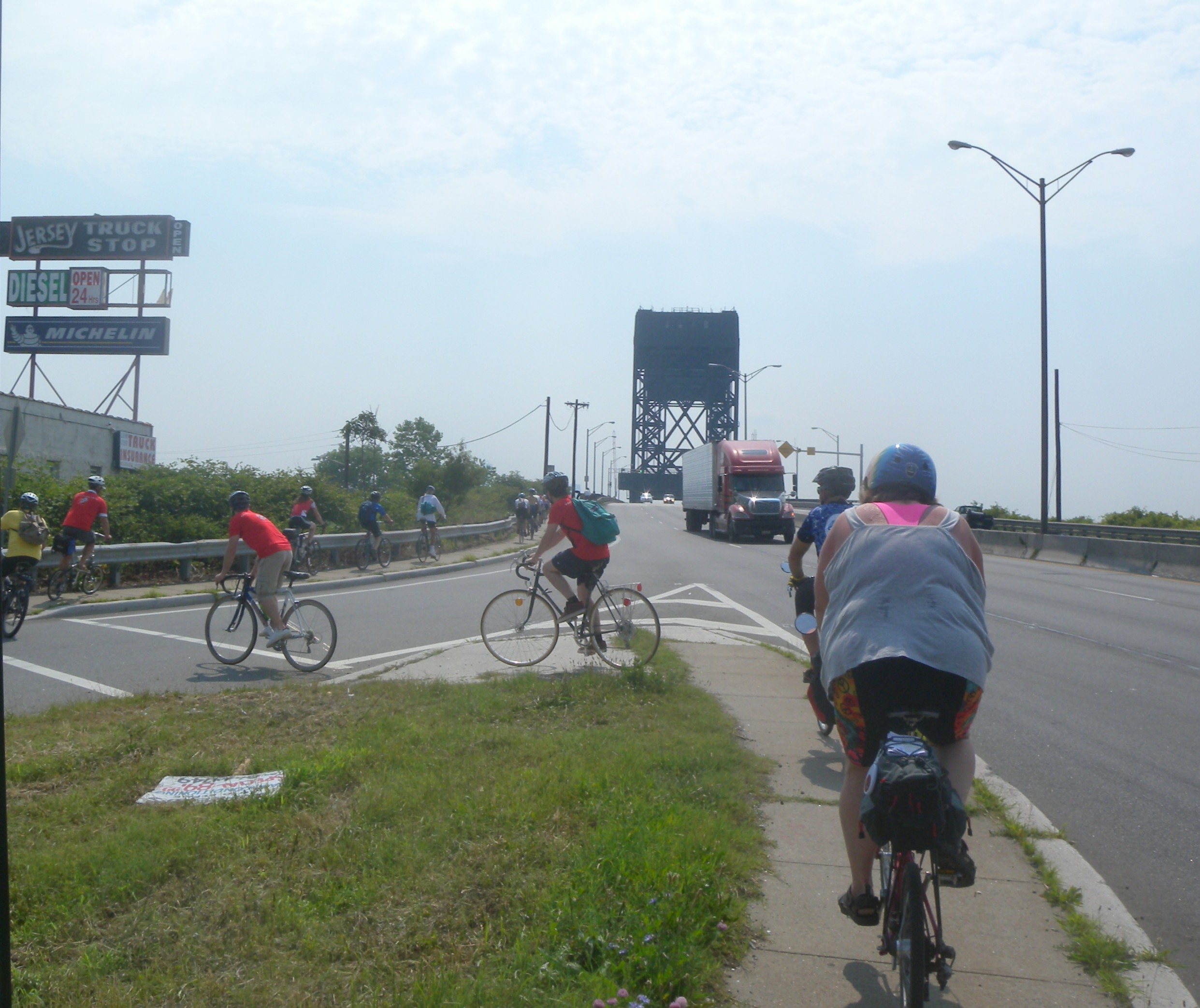
Looking east as a Greenway tour approaches the bridge over the Hackensack River in New Jersey

In 1991, a group of cyclists and long-distance trail enthusiasts met in New York City and formed a national non-profit organization, the East Coast Greenway Alliance, to plan and promote a greenway linking existing and planned trails into a contiguous "spine route" between Atlantic coast cities.

In summer 1992, the ECGA sent nine cyclists from Boston, New York City, Vermont, and Washington, D.C., on a 30-day "exploratory" cycle tour.

In 1993, tours went along the route to explore options and promote the idea of the greenway. In 1994, the first promotional tour took place from Maine to Washington, D.C. "East Coast Greenway" became a trademark in 1995.

The first five trail segments were designated in 1996. These segments were the Baltimore & Annapolis Trail in Maryland, the Charter Oak Greenway in Connecticut, the Coventry Greenway in Rhode Island, the Farmington Canal Greenway in Connecticut, and the Delaware & Raritan Canal Trail in New Jersey. These trails make up 56 miles (90 km) of the greenway.

Between 1997 and 2000, about 150 miles (240 km) of trail segments were designated throughout the region. In 2000, Amtrak became a partner, helping to open access to various parts of the route. Between February and June 2000, the ECG Wave non-motorized relay carried a bottle of seawater from Key West to Canada along the route of the ECG. From 2001 to 2004, another 173 miles (278 km) were designated, and multiple states stepped in to help finalize their section of the route. This brought in more partnerships with government organizations, such as NJDOT, that would be essential for trail development. In 2003, members of the House of Representatives and the Senate signed letters to President Bush in support of the greenway.

In 2004, seven cyclists rode the entire route, from Key West to Calais, in 55 days. Later that year, the first Maine-to-Florida tour was held; four cyclists completed the event in 52 days, raising $75,000. In the following years, more people would complete the ride outside of ECG events. A 2005 GQ magazine article about a ride by Wil Hylton brought national attention to the greenway.

The entire spine route was finalized and mapped in 2008. The accessibility of the trail expanded with support of the states, and more events were held each year.

In 2020, the route reached over 1,000 miles (1,600 km) of completed off-road greenway. Efforts to increase the amount of off-road routes continue.

On June 25, 2021, the North Carolina General Assembly passed a law adding the state's section of the greenway as its tenth State Trail.

== Route ==
Signed Sections Unsigned Sections

Major cities connected by the spine route are:

1. Calais, Maine
2. Bangor, Maine
3. Augusta, Maine
4. Portland, Maine
5. Portsmouth, New Hampshire
6. Newburyport, Massachusetts
7. Boston, Massachusetts
8. Worcester, Massachusetts
9. Providence, Rhode Island
10. Hartford, Connecticut
11. New Haven, Connecticut
12. Bridgeport, Connecticut
13. Norwalk, Connecticut
14. Stamford, Connecticut
15. New Rochelle, New York
16. New York, New York
17. Jersey City, New Jersey
18. Newark, New Jersey
19. New Brunswick, New Jersey
20. Trenton, New Jersey
21. Philadelphia, Pennsylvania
22. Wilmington, Delaware
23. Baltimore, Maryland
24. Annapolis, Maryland
25. Washington, District of Columbia
26. Richmond, Virginia
27. Durham, North Carolina
28. Raleigh, North Carolina
29. Fayetteville, North Carolina
30. Wilmington, North Carolina
31. Myrtle Beach, South Carolina
32. Charleston, South Carolina
33. Savannah, Georgia
34. Brunswick, Georgia
35. Jacksonville, Florida
36. St. Augustine, Florida
37. Daytona Beach, Florida
38. Titusville, Florida
39. Melbourne, Florida
40. Fort Pierce, Florida
41. West Palm Beach, Florida
42. Boca Raton, Florida
43. Fort Lauderdale, Florida
44. Miami, Florida
45. Key West, Florida

Other cities may be connected by an alternate route in some locations.

== Active segments ==
As of 2026, designated segments of the East Coast Greenway include:

=== New England region ===
==== Maine ====
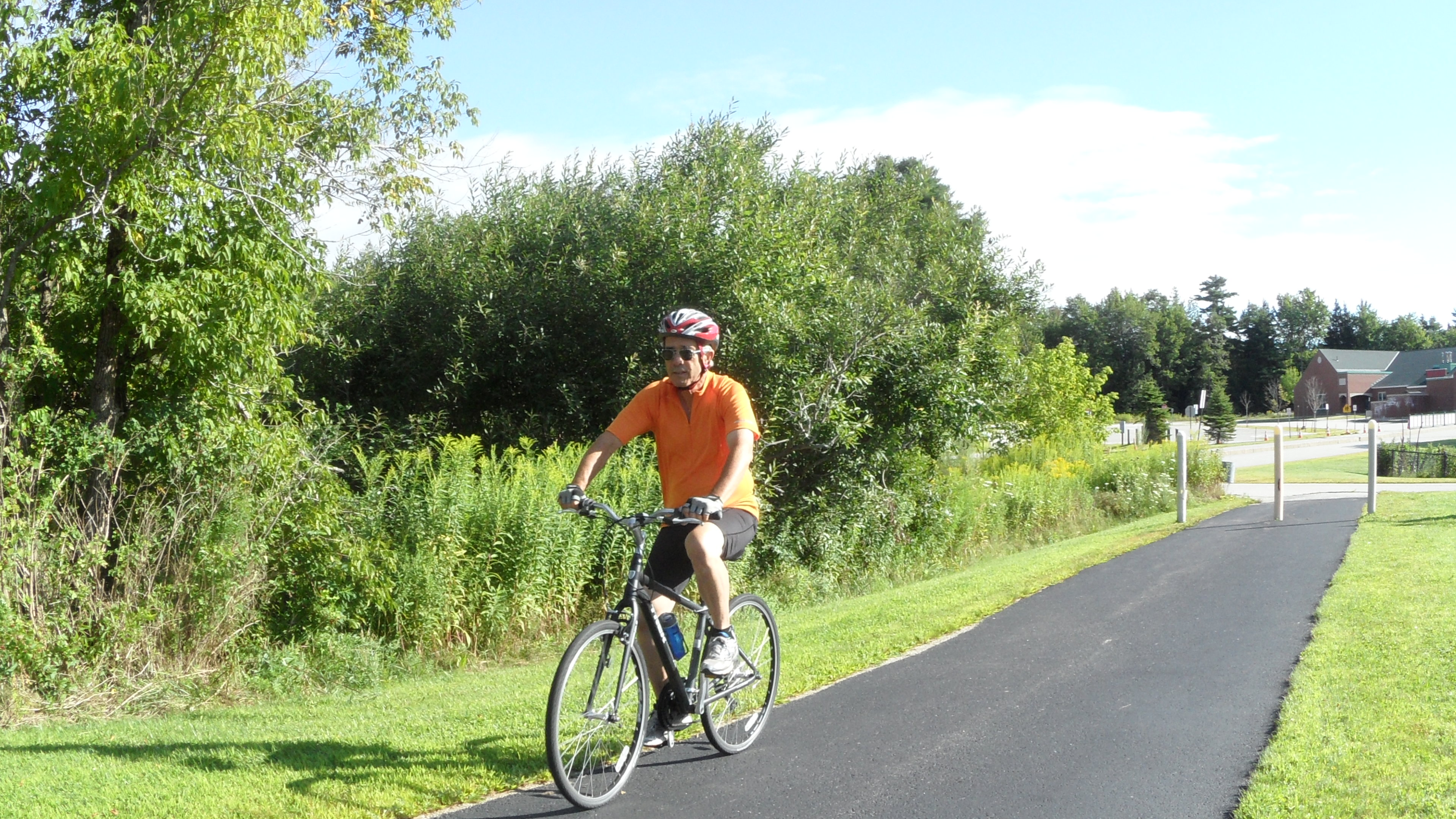
Ride on the East Coast Greenway in Maine

Travelers start in Calais, Maine, at the Canada–US border, and pedal southwest through Ellsworth, where they can stay on the inland spine route through Bangor or veer off along a 150-mile (240 km) coastal route. The routes rejoin north of Portland, then head on towards Portsmouth, New Hampshire. The route through Maine is 350 miles (560 km) long, and 39% of that is currently off-road.

- Calais Waterfront Walkway – Calais
- Moosehorn National Wildlife Refuge Trail – Baring
- Downeast Sunrise Trail – Washington & Hancock counties
- Kennebec River Rail Trail – Augusta, Hallowell, Farmingdale, to Gardiner
- Rotary Centennial Trail – Benton
- Lewiston Riverside Trail – Lewiston
- Lisbon Trail – Lisbon
- Topsham Trail – Topsham
- Androscoggin River Bicycle Path – Brunswick
- Beth Condon Memorial Pathway – Yarmouth
- Martin's Point Bridge – Falmouth to Portland
- Eastern Promenade/Connector/Back Cove Trail – Portland
- South Portland Green Belt – South Portland
- Eastern Trail – Scarborough, Saco, to Old Orchard Beach

==== New Hampshire ====
Riders enter the state on the Memorial Bridge in Portsmouth, New Hampshire, and follow the coastline to Seabrook and then on to the Massachusetts border. New Hampshire has the shortest portion of the greenway: about 17 miles (27 km), all on-road.

==== Massachusetts ====
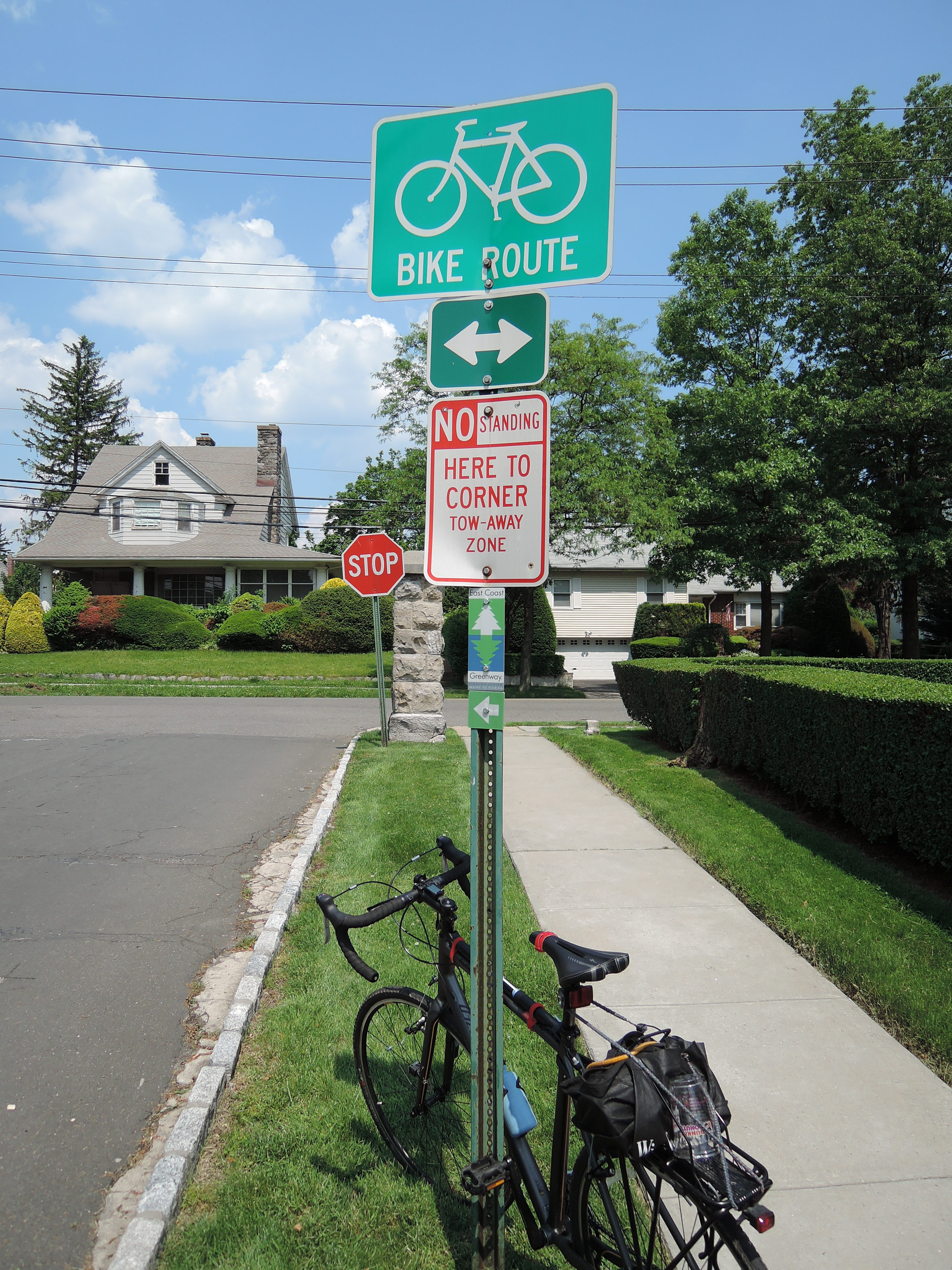
Looking northeast at an ECG sign (bottommost sign)

The greenway enters the state near Salisbury, Massachusetts, and heads south towards Boston and then to Waltham. Next, it travels on from Worcester to the Rhode Island border. The route travels along the Charles River and past the birthplace of the American Industrial Revolution.

- Border to Boston Trail – Salisbury, Newburyport, Wenham, Danvers, to Peabody
- Peabody Independence Greenway – Peabody
- Salem Bike Path – Salem
- Lynn Beach Promenade – Lynn
- Lynnway Sidepath – Lynn
- Northern Strand Community Trail – Malden to Everett
- Everett Bike Path – Everett
- North Bank Park Path – Boston to Cambridge
- Charles River Bike Path – Boston, Watertown, Newton, to Waltham
- Mass Central Rail Trail – Boston to Cambridge
- Mass Central Rail Trail—Wayside – Weston to Wayland
- Upper Charles Trail – Holliston to Milford
- Blackstone River Bikeway – Worcester to Millbury & Uxbridge to Blackstone

==== Rhode Island ====
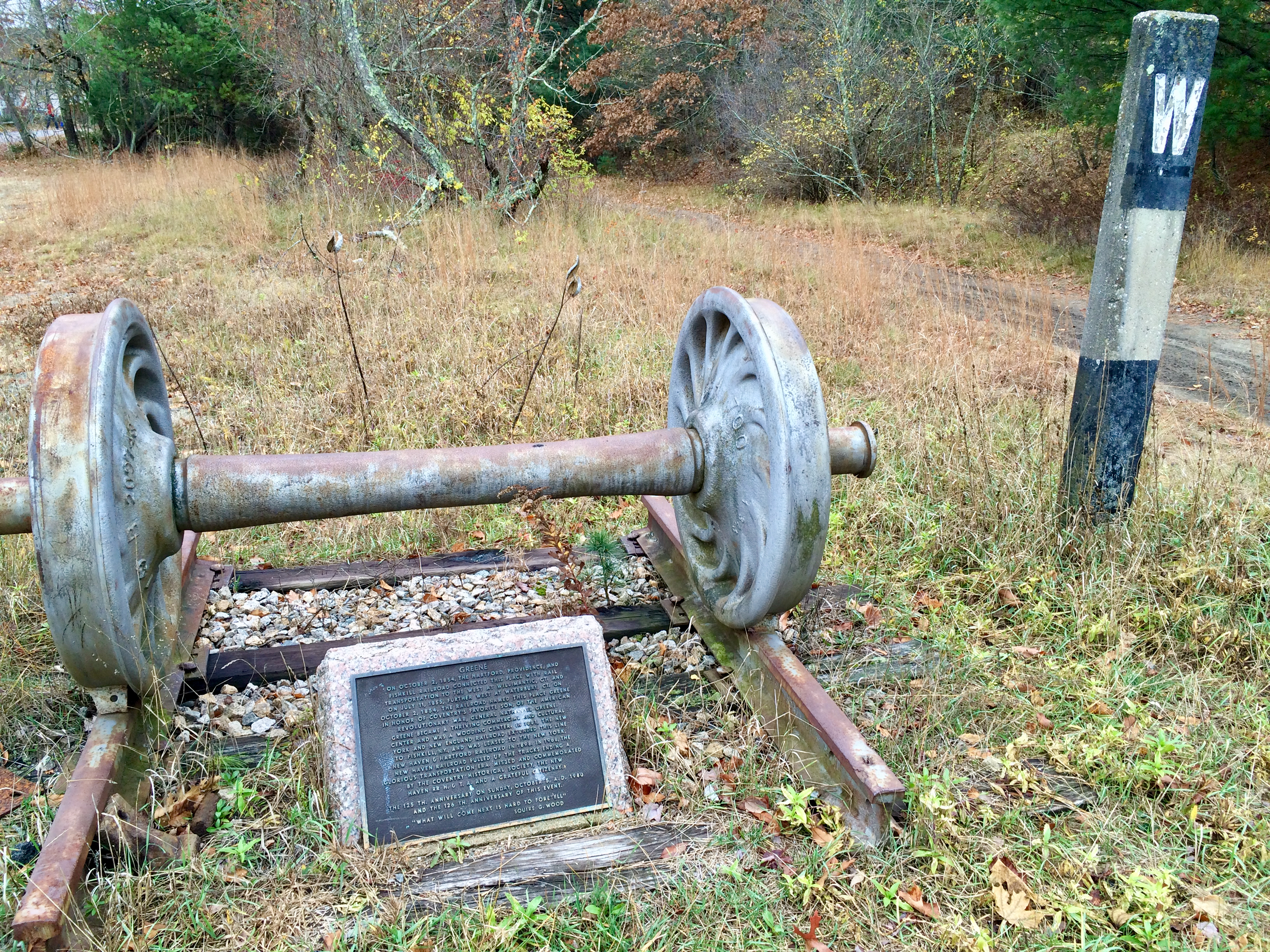
ECG Coventry Rail Trail in Greene, Rhode Island. Trail, marker post, memorial plaque and track and train axle.

The greenway enters from Massachusetts on the Blackstone River Bikeway and follows the historic Blackstone Canal. It travels down to Pawtucket and then into Providence, where it goes around India Point Park at Narragansett Bay, and then on to Cranston. This 49-mile (79 km) section of greenway is 52% off-road, with another 30% being developed.

- Blackstone River Greenway – Woonsocket, Cumberland, to Lincoln
- East Bay Bike Path – East Providence to Warren
- Providence Riverwalk in Waterplace Park – Providence
- Washington Secondary Rail Trail, which combines:
  - Cranston Bike Path – Cranston
  - Warwick Greenway – Warwick
  - West Warwick Greenway – West Warwick
  - Coventry Greenway and Trestle Trail – Coventry

==== Connecticut ====
Connecticut has the most rural stretch of trail in the region. It runs through historic mill towns, such as Willimantic, and major cities like Hartford, New Haven, Bridgeport, and Stamford. Users can travel on the Farmington Canal Greenway to get to New Haven from Simsbury and then ride along the Long Island Sound as they exit the state. Currently, 28% of the 198-mile (319 km) route is off-road, with an additional 28% in development.

- Moosup Valley State Park Trail – Plainfield
- Quinebaug River Trail – Killingly
- Tracy Road Smart Parks Trail – Killingly to Putnam
- Air Line State Park Trail North – Windham County
- Veterans Memorial Greenway – Willimantic
- Hop River State Park Trail - Willimantic to Bolton
- Charter Oak Greenway – Manchester to East Hartford
- Founders Bridge Path – Hartford to East Hartford
- Phoenix Plaza – Hartford
- Travelers Plaza – Hartford
- Bushnell Park Path – Hartford
- Farmington Canal Heritage Trail – Simsbury, Avon, Farmington, Southington, Cheshire, Hamden, to New Haven
- Savin Rock Trail – West Haven
- Long Wharf Nature Preserve Trail – New Haven
- Silver Sands State Park Path – Milford

=== Mid-Atlantic region ===
==== New York ====
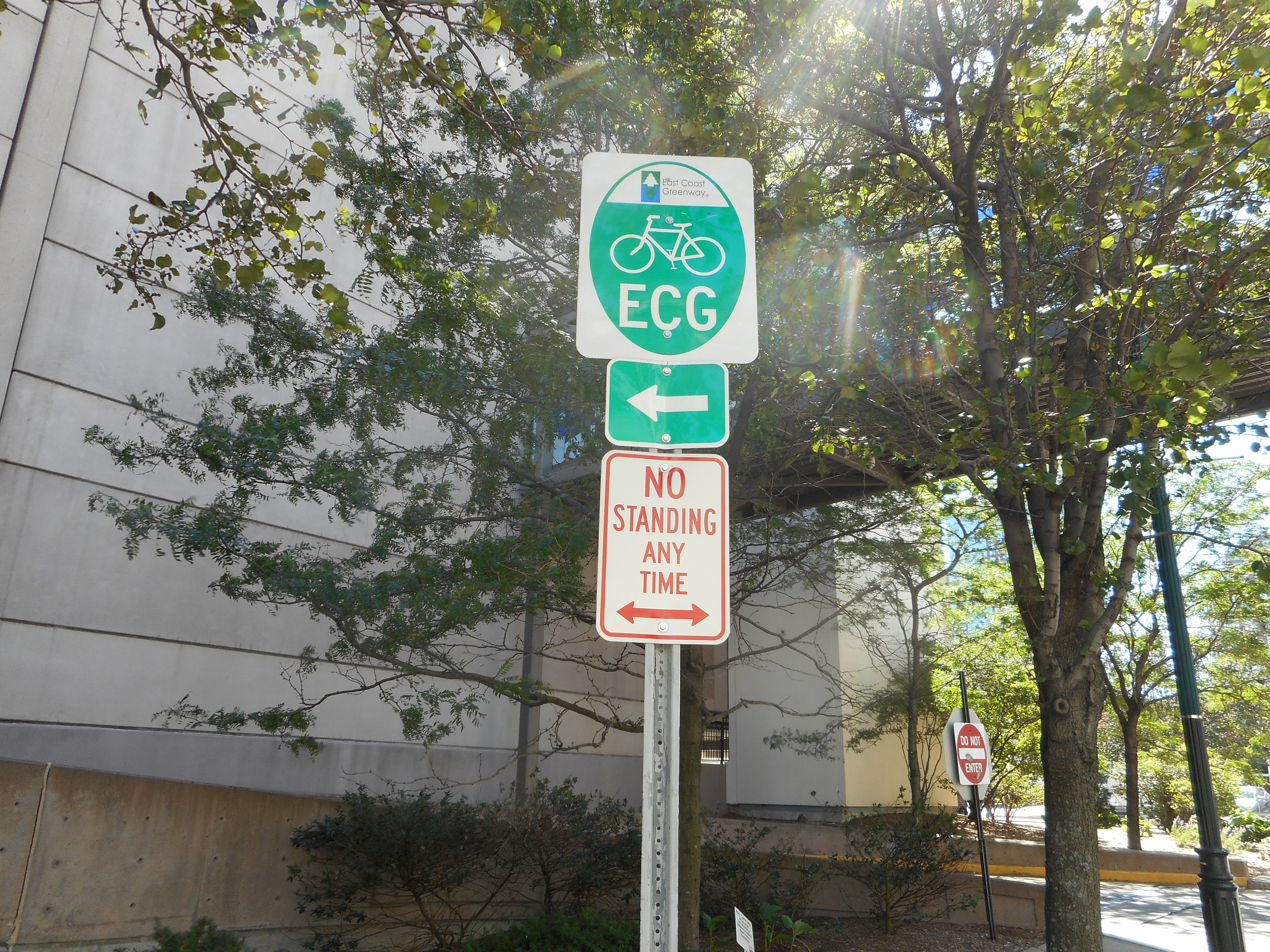
East Coast Greenway bicycle sign between New Rock City and Trump Plaza in downtown New Rochelle, New York

The New York segments starts in Westchester County and heads south into New York City through the Bronx and Manhattan. The route travels down sections of Broadway and along the Hudson River, which travelers can cross via the George Washington Bridge or by taking a NY Waterway ferry into New Jersey. New York is home to 44 miles (71 km) of greenway, with 62% of the route, the highest percentage on the greenway, being off-road. In Manhattan, 90% of the trail is off-road. Part of the New York City segment is concurrent with the Empire State Trail, which also goes up the west side of Manhattan but diverges from the East Coast Greenway in the Bronx, heading northward through the state instead of towards Connecticut.

- Shore Road Greenway – Bronx
- Pelham Parkway Greenway – Bronx
- Bronx Park Greenway – Bronx
- Bronx River Pathway – Bronx
- Mosholu Parkway Greenway – Bronx
- Van Cortlandt Park Greenway – Bronx
- Hudson River Greenway – Manhattan
- Randall's Island Greenway – Manhattan
- 103rd Street Footbridge – Manhattan
- East River Esplanade – Manhattan
- NY Waterway Ferry – Manhattan to Jersey City, NJ

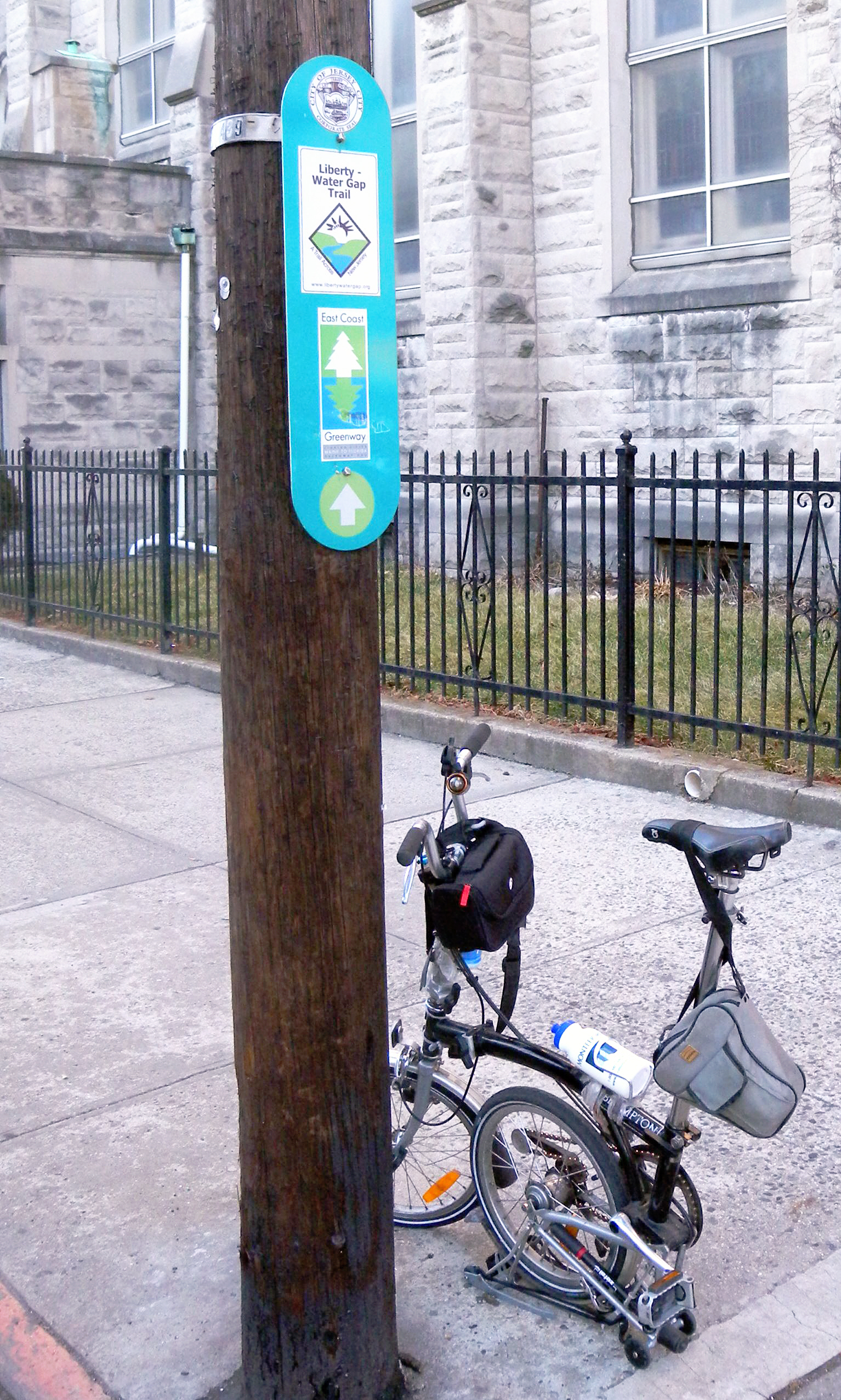
Near Lincoln Park (Jersey City)

==== New Jersey ====
The New Jersey section of the greenway is accessed from New York across the Hudson River by the George Washington Bridge or ferry, and from Pennsylvania by the Calhoun Street Bridge across the Delaware River. The route travels through Jersey City, Newark, New Brunswick, and Trenton while also traveling through rural areas. New Jersey has the second-highest percentage of off-road trails at 54%.

- Hudson River Waterfront Walkway – Hudson Waterfront – Fort Lee to Jersey City
- Local streets – Jersey City
- Lincoln Park Path – Jersey City
- Lincoln Highway Hackensack River Bridge and Passaic River Bridge (Wittpenn Bridge, once completed c. 2022)
- Newark Riverfront Trail – Newark
- Weequahic Park – Newark
- Rahway River Parkway – Union County
  - Black Brook Park Path – Kenilworth
  - Lenape Park Path – Union County
  - Nomahegan Park Path – Cranford
- Roosevelt Park Path – Metuchen
- Merrill Park Path – Middlesex County
- Middlesex Greenway – Middlesex County
- Donaldson Park Path – Middlesex County
- Johnson Park Path – Piscataway
- Landing Lane Bridge Path – Piscataway & New Brunswick
- D&R Canal Trail – New Brunswick & Trenton
- D&R Canal Towpath – Hamilton & Bordentown
- Calhoun Street Bridge – Trenton, New Jersey, to Morrisville, Pennsylvania

==== Pennsylvania ====
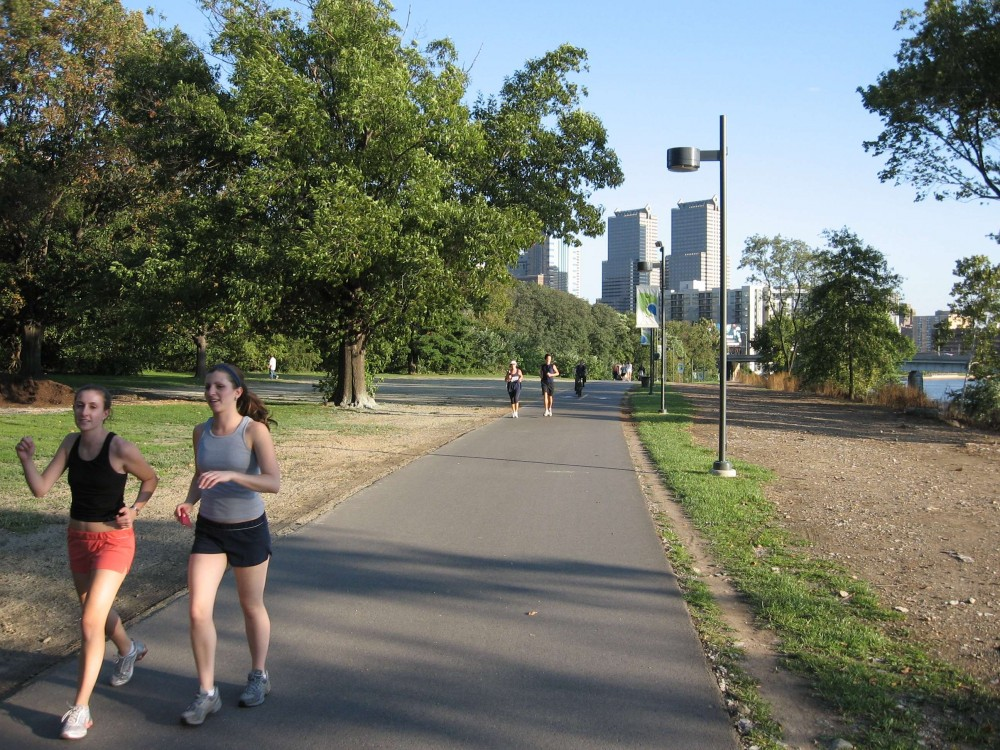
Schuylkill River Trail in Philadelphia

The greenway travels through the smaller towns of Bucks County, then through the city of Philadelphia, where it passes numerous historical landmarks and travels over Spring Garden Street, which has bike lanes going both ways. The route follows the Schuylkill River Trail south towards Delaware. The 67-mile (108 km) route is 31% off-road, but there is a third of the trail that has no route yet. Planning is being done to close the gaps.

- Delaware Canal State Park Trail – Bucks County
- Bristol Spur Line Park Trail – Bristol
- Pennypack Creek Park Trail – Philadelphia
- Port Richmond Trail – Philadelphia
- K&T Trail at Lardner's Point Park – Philadelphia
- Penn Street Trail – Philadelphia
- Schuylkill River Trail – Philadelphia
- Bartram's Gardens Trail – Philadelphia
- Grays Ferry Crescent – Philadelphia
- Cobbs Creek Trail – Philadelphia
- 58th Street Connector – Philadelphia
- Heinz NWR Trail – Philadelphia
- Route 291 Sidepath – Eddystone
- Chester Riverwalk – Chester

==== Delaware ====
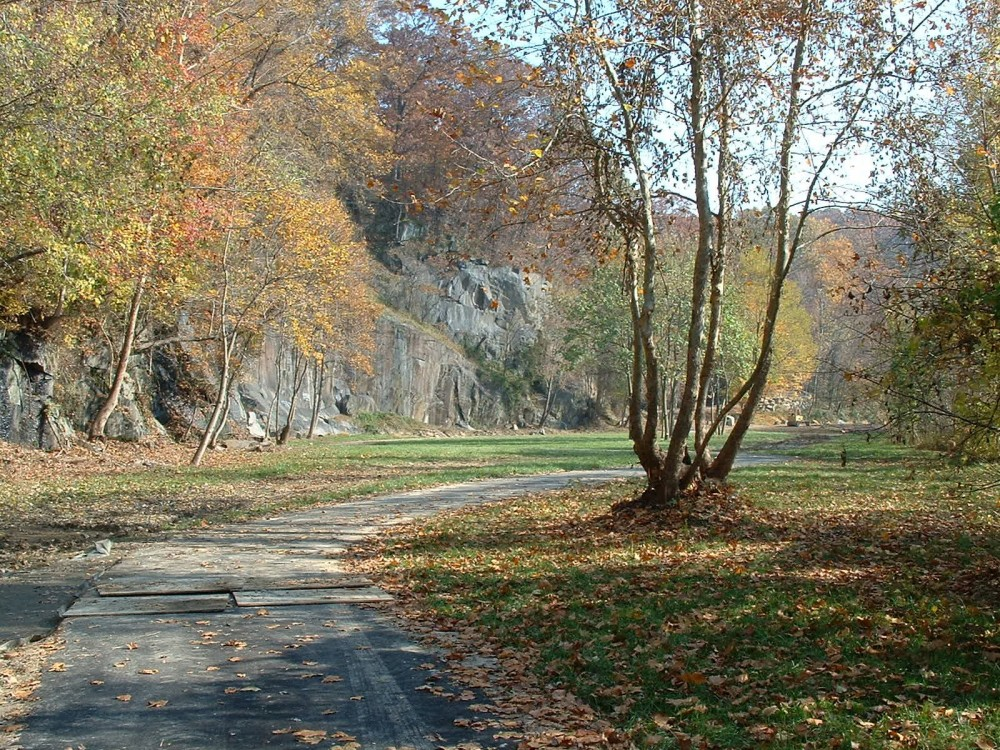
Northern Delaware Greenway in Wilmington

The greenway runs for 43 miles (69 km) through Delaware. Greenway users travel down the Northern Delaware Greenway to historic Wilmington and continue on to the Christina Riverwalk. Next, travelers head to historic New Castle and ride along the New Castle Riverfront before reaching Newark and heading west towards Maryland.

- Northern Delaware Greenway – New Castle County
- Christina Riverwalk – Wilmington
- Jack A. Markell Trail – New Castle
- New Castle Riverfront Greenway – New Castle
- Penn Farm Trail – New Castle
- Churchmans Road sidepath – New Castle County
- Delaware Route 4 sidepath – New Castle County
- Library Road sidepath – Newark
- James F. Hall Trail – Newark

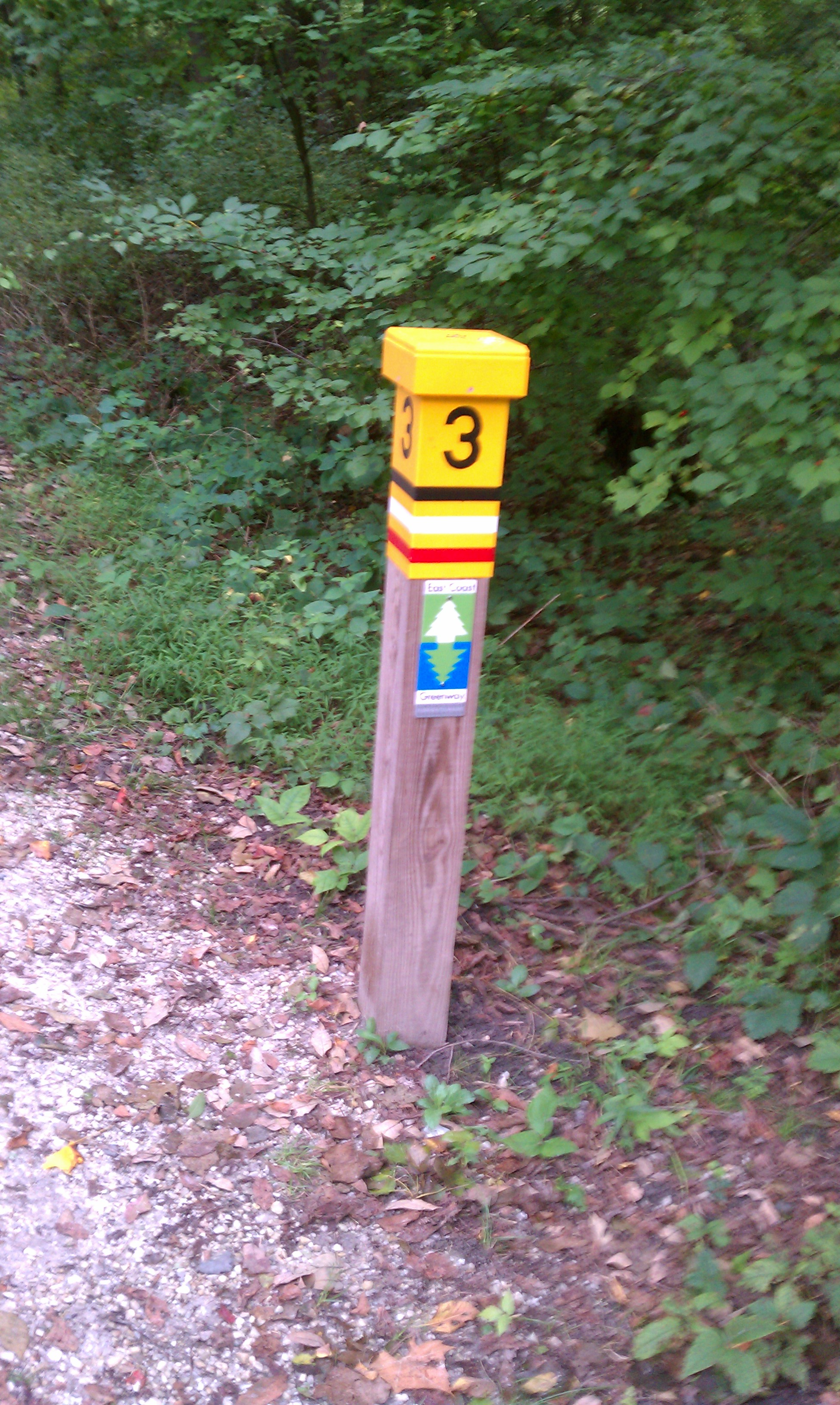
One of the mile markers on the Torrey C. Brown Rail Trail, showing its designation as part of the East Coast Greenway.

==== Maryland ====
The route starts in Elkton, Maryland, and heads west to Perryville and the Susquehanna River. Travelers pass the Perry Point VA Medical Center and have great views of the Chesapeake Bay. They cross the Susquehanna at the Thomas J. Hatem Memorial Bridge, but they are limited to crossing between dawn and dusk on weekends, holidays, and special events that have been arranged in advance, and they must be at least 18 years old or have a valid driver's license. Havre de Grace is after the bridge, followed by Harford County, Monkton, and Cockeysville. Next, riders travel south through Baltimore and then on to Annapolis before finishing the 166-mile (267 km) stretch of greenway in Hyattsville and entering Washington, D.C. About 32 percent of the route is off-road.

- Torrey C. Brown Rail Trail – MD border to Ashland (Cockeysville)
- Jones Falls Trail – Baltimore
- Gwynns Falls Trail – Baltimore
- BWI Trail – BWI Airport
- Baltimore & Annapolis Trail – Glen Burnie to Annapolis
- Colonial Annapolis Maritime Trail System – Annapolis
- South Shore Trail – Anne Arundel County
- Odenton Road Bicycle Path – Odenton
- Washington, Baltimore and Annapolis Trail – Anne Arundel County
- Anacostia Tributary Trail System – Prince George's County

==== District of Columbia ====
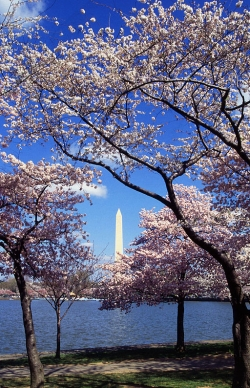
View of the Washington Monument and cherry blossoms from the East Coast Greenway

The trail splits in Bladensburg, Maryland, just before it reaches Washington, D.C. Travelers can follow the Metropolitan Branch Trail, which runs past Washington Union Station, or the Anacostia Riverwalk Trail, which follows the Anacostia River past the Washington Navy Yard. The two trails rejoin at the National Mall, the ECG's official midpoint, then head for Virginia via the Arlington Memorial Bridge over the Potomac River. Just under half of the 8-mile (13 km) segment through the District is off-road; the downtown area offers no off-road option.

- Metropolitan Branch Trail
- Anacostia Riverwalk Trail
- National Mall Path

=== South Atlantic region ===
==== Virginia ====
Leaving Washington, D.C., travelers pick up the Mount Vernon Trail to Mount Vernon, head towards Fredericksburg on the Potomac Heritage Trail, and continue on to the state capital of Richmond. At this point, the greenway splits: the 300-mile (480 km) spine route (16% off-road) continues southwest to the Piedmont region of North Carolina. The alternate route, the 140-mile (230 km) Historic Coastal Route (46% off-road), travels southeast through Jamestown and Williamsburg, then towards Wilmington, North Carolina.

- Mount Vernon Trail – Arlington Memorial Bridge, Washington, D.C., to Mount Vernon
- Silverbrook Road Multi-use Trail – Fairfax County
- Ox Road Multi-use Trail – Fairfax County
- Richmond Highway Multi-use Trail – Fairfax County
- Telegraph Road Multi-use Trail – Fairfax County
- Fairfax County Parkway Multi-use Trail – Fairfax County
- Grist Mill Park Multi-use Trail – Fairfax County
- Virginia Central Railway Trail – Fredericksburg
- Ashland Railside Park Trail – Ashland
- Cannon Creek Greenway – Cannon Creek Greenway
- The Fall Line (trail)
- Belle Isle Bridge – Richmond
- Belle Isle Trail – Richmond
- Lower Appomattox River Trail – Petersburg
- Tobacco Heritage Trail – Lawrenceville, La Crosse, to Brodnax
- Virginia Capital Trail – Richmond to Williamsburg

==== North Carolina ====
The Greenway's spine route travels south through rural North Carolina into the Research Triangle Region, passing through Durham, Raleigh, and Cary. This section is on the American Tobacco Trail, which runs past the East Coast Greenway Alliance Headquarters in Durham. The route continues southwest through the Sandhills region and into Fayetteville before following the Cape Fear River into Wilmington and traveling along the coast. Alternatively, the Historic Coast Route, entering from southeastern Virginia, moves onto the Dismal Swamp Canal Trail and follows the coast down through Greenville and Jacksonville before reaching Wilmington where the routes connect. The 372-mile (599 km) spine route is 25% off-road at this time. The state designated the greenway as a part of its State Trail System.

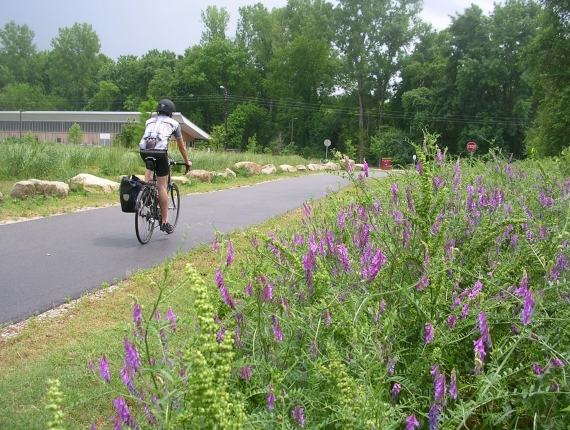
Little Rock Trail in Raleigh, NC

- Ellerbe Creek Trail – Durham
- South Ellerbee Creek Trail – Durham
- Downtown Trail – Durham
- American Tobacco Trail – Durham County, Chatham County, to Wake County
- Black Creek Greenway – Cary
- White Oak Greenway – Cary, Apex
- Umstead State Park Trail – Wake County
- Reedy Creek Greenway – Raleigh
- Walnut Creek Trail – Raleigh
- Rocky Branch Trail – Raleigh
- Pullen Park Trail – Raleigh
- Little Rock Trail – Raleigh
- Lower Walnut Creek Trail – Raleigh
- Chavis Way Sidepath – Raleigh
- Central Raleigh Trail – Raleigh
- Neuse River Trail – Raleigh & Clayton
- Buffalo Creek Greenway – Smithfield
- Dunn-Erwin Trail – Dunn & Erwin
- South Tar River Greenway - Greenville
- Cape Fear River Trail – Fayetteville
- Jacksonville Rail-Trail – Jacksonville
- Greenfield Lake Path – Wilmington
- Wilmington Riverwalk – Wilmington
- Cross-City Greenway – Wilmington
- Dismal Swamp Canal Trail – South Mills
- Carolina Beach Greenway – Carolina Beach
- North Carolina Aquarium at Fort Fisher Trail – Kure Beach
- Southport to Fort Fisher Ferry
- Emerald Path – Emerald Isle

==== South Carolina ====
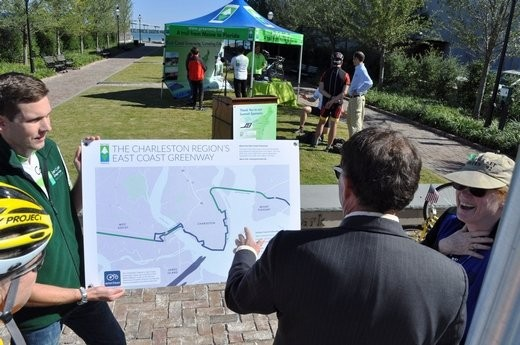
Showing the map of the Charleston segment of the East Coast Greenway at an event in Charleston

The 270-mile (430 km) trail travels along South Carolina's coast through Myrtle Beach, Georgetown, Charleston, and Beaufort. The route is 15% off-road, with 20% more in development.

- North Myrtle Beach Greenway, Barefoot Resort Segment – North Myrtle Beach
- Colonel Robert Bell Pass Trail – Myrtle Beach
- Grissom Parkway Trail – Myrtle Beach
- Harrelson Boulevard Trail – Myrtle Beach
- King's Highway Trail – Myrtle Beach
- Waccamaw Neck Bikeway – Litchfield, Murrells Inlet, to Pawleys Island
- Ben Sawyer Boulevard Sidepath – Mount Pleasant to Sullivan's Island
- Garret P. Wonders Memorial Bike/Ped Lane – Charleston to Mount Pleasant
- East Bay Trail – Charleston
- West Ashley Greenway – Charleston
- New River Trail – Bluffton

=== Southeast region ===
==== Georgia ====
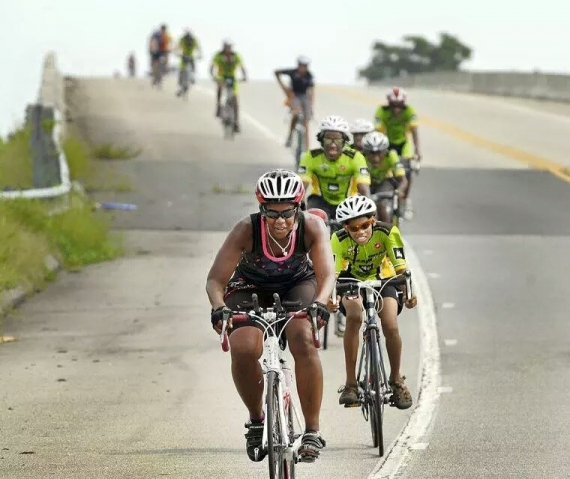
The Path to Freedom Tour traveling south on the East Coast Greenway

Greenway riders in Georgia will use the Coastal Georgia Greenway to travel from South Carolina to Florida. The route travels through Savannah, Richmond Hill, Midway, Riceboro, Darien, Brunswick, Woodbine, Kingsland, and St. Marys. The 160-mile (260 km) route is only 6% off-road but has another 14% in development. There are 41 miles (66 km) of gaps, but efforts are being made to connect the route.

- Belles Ferry – Savannah
- Tom Triplett Park Trail – Savannah
- Chief Of Love Trail – Chatham County
- Canebrake Road Sidepath – Chatham County
- Highlander Trail – Darien
- Marshes of Glynn Trail – Brunswick
- White Oak Trail – White Oak
- Woobine Riverwalk – Woodbine
- St. Mary's Downtown Trail – St. Marys

==== Florida ====
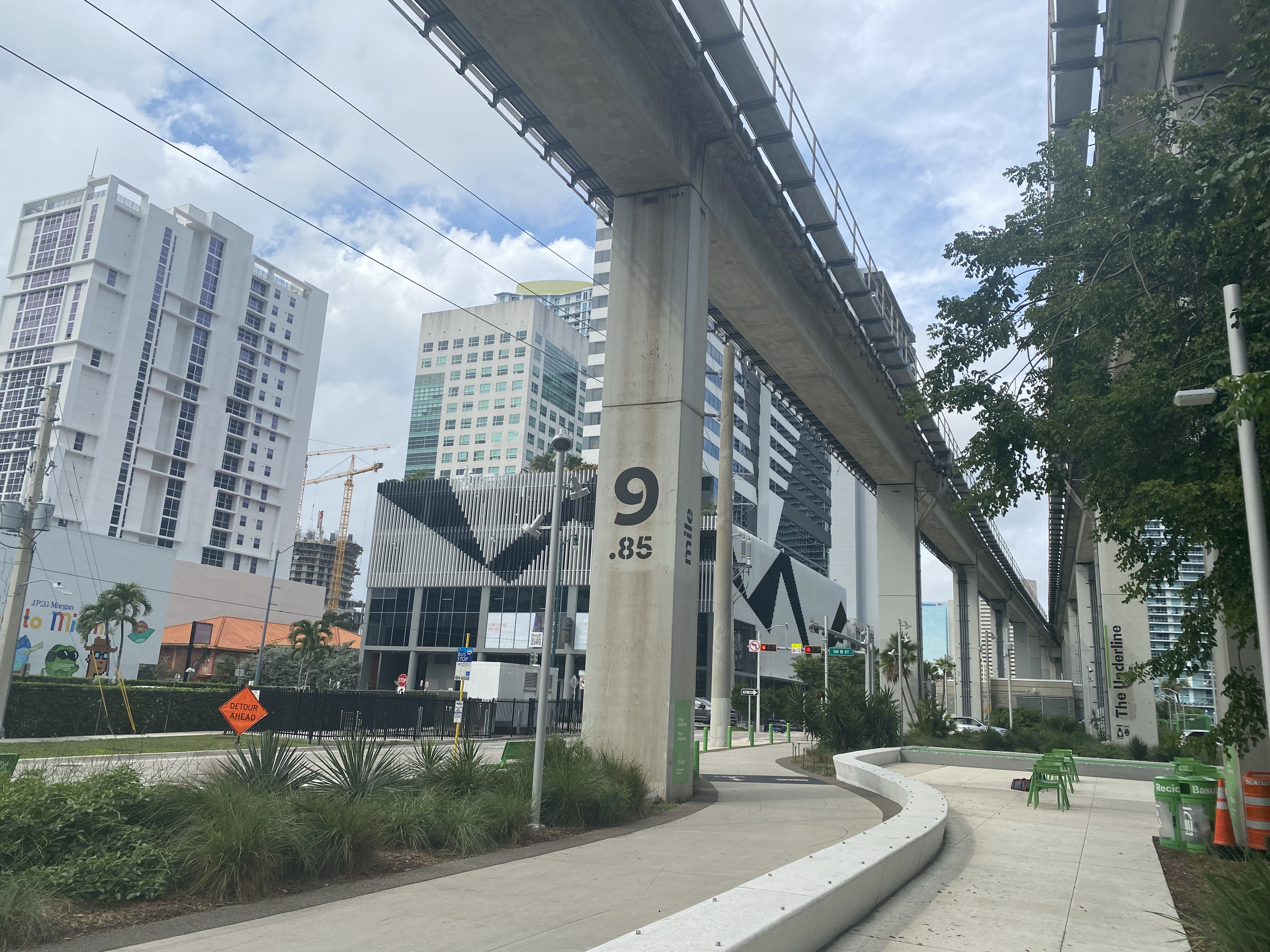
Underline in Miami

The Florida section of the ECG starts in Fernandina Beach and travels south along the coast through small beach towns and major cities, such as Jacksonville and Miami. The route continues down through islands and bridges to the southernmost point of the continental United States, Key West. This segment of greenway is 600 miles (970 km) long, the longest of the ECG, and is 31% off-road. There is another 13% in development and another 38% in public control and is to be developed. There are some gaps.

- Amelia Island Trail – Nassau County
- River to Sea Trail – Flagler County
- Jacksonville North Bank Riverwalk – Jacksonville
- St. Johns River Ferry – Ft. George to Mayport
- Timucuan Trail – Jacksonville
- Palatka–St. Augustine State Trail – St. Johns County
- Mickler Trail – St. Augustine Beach
- Halifax River Trail – Holly Hill to Daytona Beach
- Spring-to-Spring Trail – Volusia County
- East Coast Central Regional Rail Trail – Volusia County
- A1A Sidepath – Brevard County
- Prima Vista Blvd Sidepath – St. Lucie County
- Walton Rd Sidepath – St. Lucie County
- Green River Parkway Trail – Martin County to Port St. Lucie
- Seabranch Trail – Martin County
- Jupiter Riverwalk – Jupiter
- West Palm Beach Trail – West Palm Beach
- A1A Sidepath – Boca Raton
- Hollywood Broadwalk – Hollywood
- Atlantic Greenway – Miami Beach
- M Path Trail / The Underline – Miami-Dade County
- South Dade Rail Trail – Miami-Dade County
- Overseas Heritage Trail – Key Largo to Key West

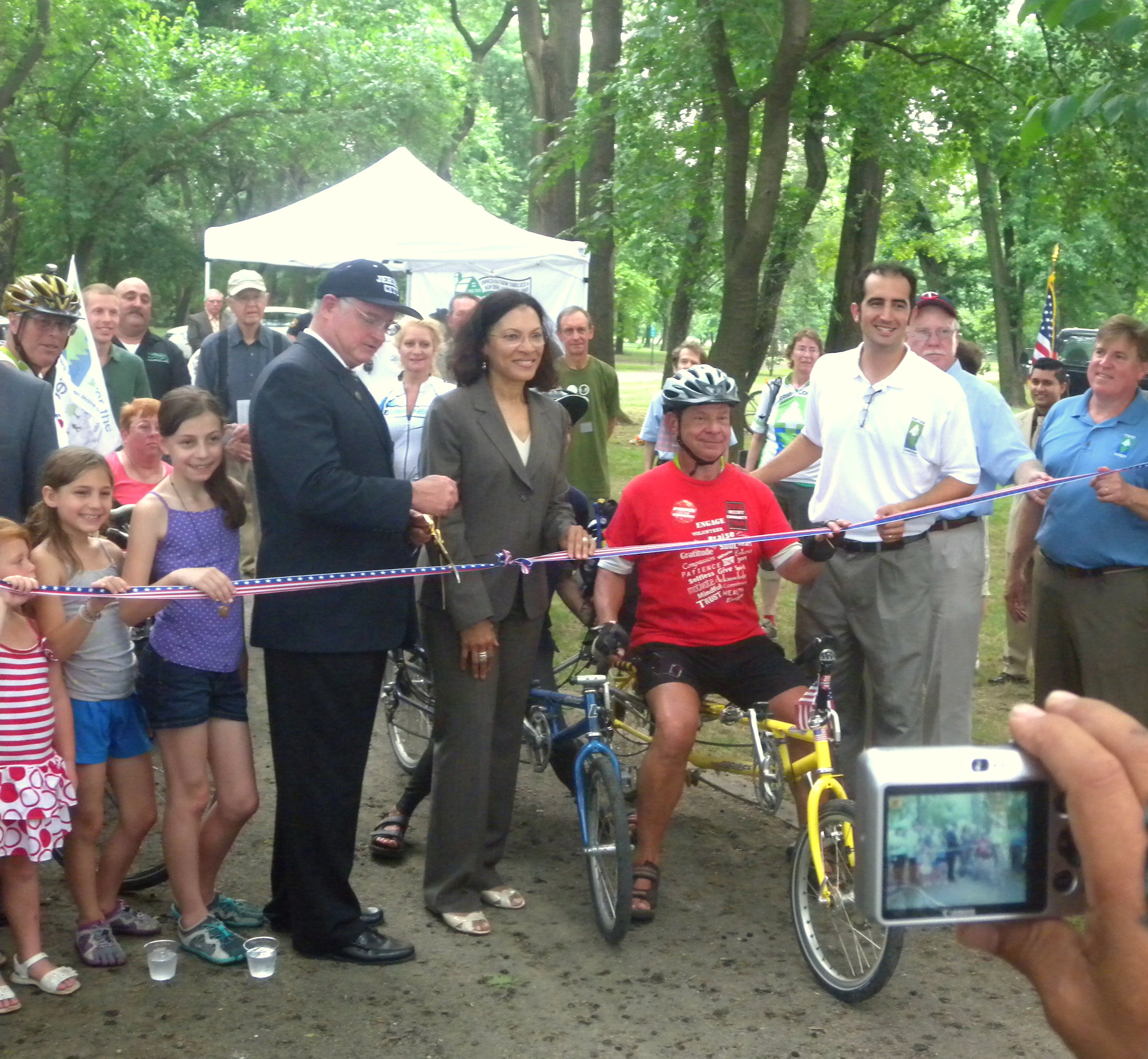
Jerramiah Healy, Mayor of Jersey City, cuts ribbon for a bikeway to Newark.

== East Coast Greenway Alliance ==
The East Coast Greenway Alliance is a nonprofit organization that leads development of — but does not own — the 3,000-mile Maine-to-Florida Greenway. The Alliance headquarters is on the Greenway route in Durham, North Carolina. Greenway managers work remotely in their regions to further development of the Greenway alongside local partners.

The Alliance coordinates the Greenway's growth by working with local, state, regional and national organizations and agencies from early planning through ribbon cuttings. The Alliance partners with communities to secure funding, share trail-building best practices and connect efforts across communities. The Alliance designates new trail segments, develops routes for the Greenway, installs signs designating the path, spreads awareness of the project and provides maps of and information about the Greenway.

== Awards ==
- Named one of the National Millennium Trails by the White House in 1999
- Kodak American Greenway Award in 1999 by The Conservation Fund in Washington, DC, by the National Geographic Society
- GoSmart Golden Modes Community Impact Award in 2015
- GSK IMPACT Award in 2015
- Bicycle Friendly Business for 2016 – 2020 by the League of American Bicyclists

== See also ==
- Appalachian Trail
- Ohio River Trail
- List of rail trails
- U.S. Bicycle Route 1
