= Washington Secondary Rail Trail =

Rail trail in Rhode Island, US

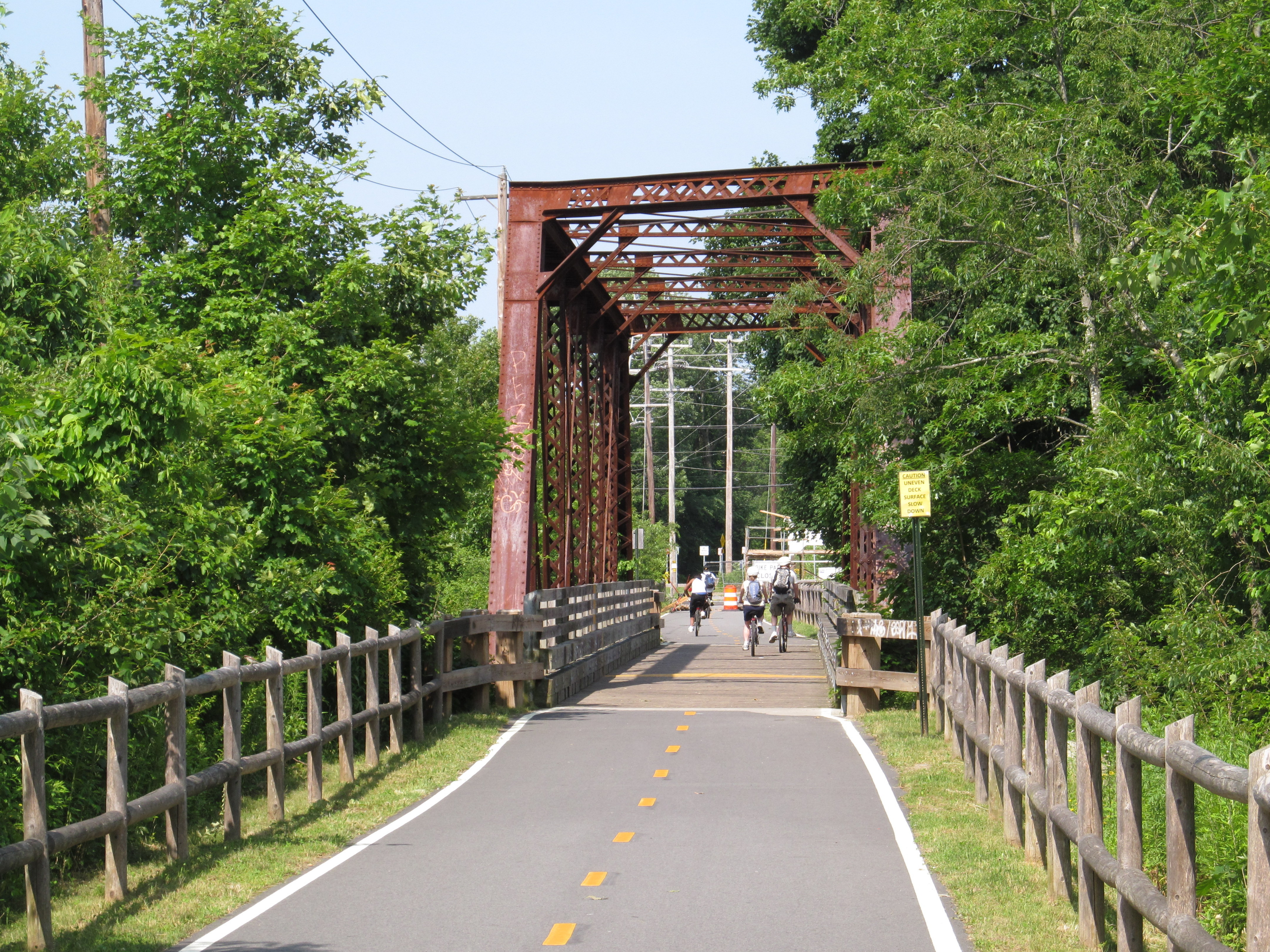
Truss bridge carrying the trail over the Pawtuxet River in Coventry, Rhode Island

The Washington Secondary Rail Trail (also known as the Washington Secondary Bike Path) is a rail trail located in Rhode Island. The trail measures 19 miles (31 km) and has sections that are paved and unpaved. It runs along an abandoned rail corridor of the former Hartford, Providence and Fishkill Railroad. The trail serves the communities of Coventry, West Warwick, Warwick, and Cranston. It combines, from west to east, the Trestle Trail, Trestle Trail East, Coventry Greenway, West Warwick Greenway, Warwick Greenway, and Cranston Bike Path.

Long-term plans envision the Washington Secondary Rail Trail connecting with the Blackstone River Bikeway, the East Bay Bike Path, and the Moosup Valley State Park Trail in Connecticut. The Washington Secondary Rail Trail is a designated section of the East Coast Greenway.

In 2014, the original Coventry Greenway section was rehabilitated, and the 4.8 miles (7.7 km) Trestle Trail East section was added, extending the western end by almost five miles. Connecting the last section to the Connecticut border (and connection to the Moosup Valley State Park Trail) is planned, which would bring the total length of the path to 24.0 miles (38.6 km).
