= Southern New England Trunkline Trail =

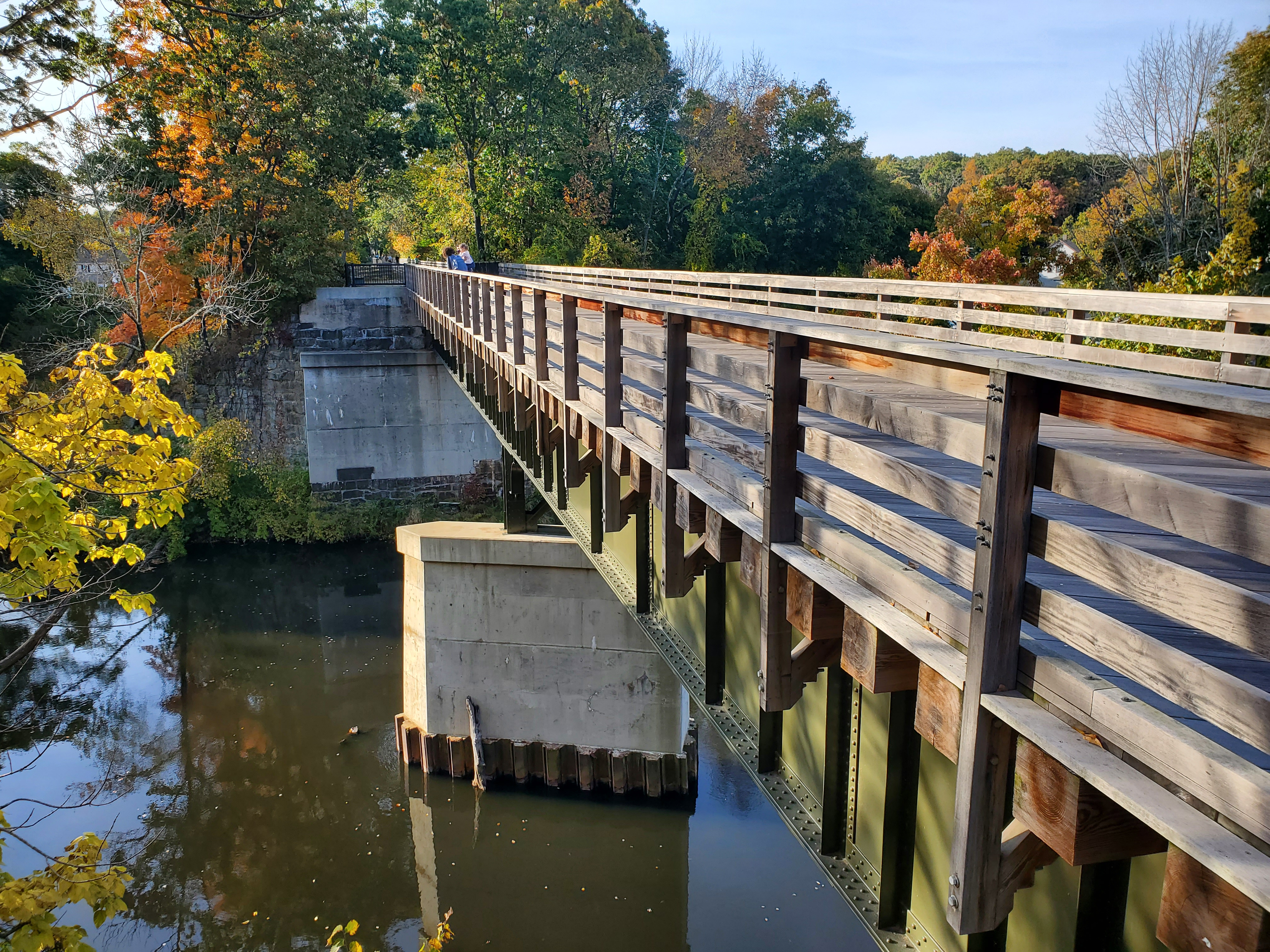
- View along the side of the Southern New England Trunkline Trail bridge over the Blackstone River
- Length: 22 miles (35 km)
- Location: Southern Massachusetts
- Designation: Massachusetts state park
- Trailheads: Franklin (42°03′43″N 71°25′42″W); Douglas (42°00′44″N 71°47′59″W)
- Use: Hiking, biking, horseback riding
- Maintainer: Department of Conservation and Recreation
- Website: Southern New England Trunkline Trail Location of trailheads in Massachusetts

The Southern New England Trunkline Trail (SNETT) is a rail trail in Massachusetts. The trail passes through the towns of Douglas, Uxbridge, Millville, Blackstone, Bellingham, and Franklin and is one of the longest trails in southern Massachusetts. It is designated for use by pedestrians, equestrians and non-motorized vehicles, with motorized off-road vehicles excluded.

It occupies an abandoned railroad corridor running for approximately 22 miles (35 km) with an eastern terminus at Union Street in downtown Franklin, Massachusetts and a western terminus at the Connecticut state line in the Douglas State Forest, Douglas, Massachusetts. The trail continues into Connecticut as the Air Line State Park Trail, which extends south to Willimantic, Connecticut then west to East Hampton, Connecticut near the Connecticut River. It is a vital part of the southern New England rail-trail system.

Despite its name, the trail does not follow any part of the Southern New England Railway, a railroad intended to run from Palmer, Massachusetts to Providence, whose right-of-way was partially constructed but never completed. Rather, this railroad was built as the Norfolk County Railroad, east of the Blackstone station, and the Southbridge and Blackstone Railroad west of the station to the Connecticut state line. Later, the route became part of the New York and New England Railroad, which was subsequently absorbed by the New Haven Railroad.

The trail is discontinuous, as interruptions to the trail are at Massachusetts Route 146, a missing bridge over Route 146A in Uxbridge, and a bridge over the Blackstone River and Rte. 122 in Blackstone, just north of the Rhode Island state line. In a four-year project ending in 2016, 8 bridges and one culvert were repaired, replaced, or built, including the Triad bridge in Millville over the Blackstone River and Providence and Worcester Railroad. These are the two Factory Pond Bridges, the northern Canal Street Bridge, a Blackstone River Bridge, and the St. Paul Street Bridge. New bridges were built across Kane Court and Main Street in Blackstone and a tunnel was built under Church Street in Blackstone. The path was resurfaced with asphalt in these 3.5 miles from St. Paul Street in Blackstone to Rte. 146A in Uxbridge. East of St. Paul Street, Blackstone, the second Canal Street Bridge and the two concrete arch viaducts (one of seven arches) were renovated. All of the trail between the missing Blackstone River and Rte. 122 bridge in Blackstone and Rte. 146A in Uxbridge is part of both the SNETT and the Blackstone River Greenway (formerly the Blackstone River Bikeway).

Between Central Street, Millville, and the Triad Bridges, a short side trail provides access to the Blackstone Canal's Millville Lock, the best preserved on the canal.

East of Blackstone, improvement work is proceeding west from Grove Street in Franklin. East of Grove Street, the right-of-way is still occupied by a railroad track. In the center of town along this track, after a junction with the former Milford and Woonsocket Railroad, is the active Franklin station, the second-to-last station on the Franklin/Foxboro Line of the MBTA Commuter Rail. In November 2024, the Franklin Town Council approved plans to purchase the right-of-way between Grove Street and Union Street for trail use.

At Prospect Street in Franklin, where a former overpass was replaced by a fill, a new tunnel was completed under the road in 2020. A tunnel was built at Rte. 126 in Bellingham when the existing highway overpass was replaced.

The trail was designated as a National Recreation Trail in 1994, having been acquired in 1984 by the Massachusetts Department of Environmental Management.
