= William Howard Taft =

President of the United States from 1909 to 1913

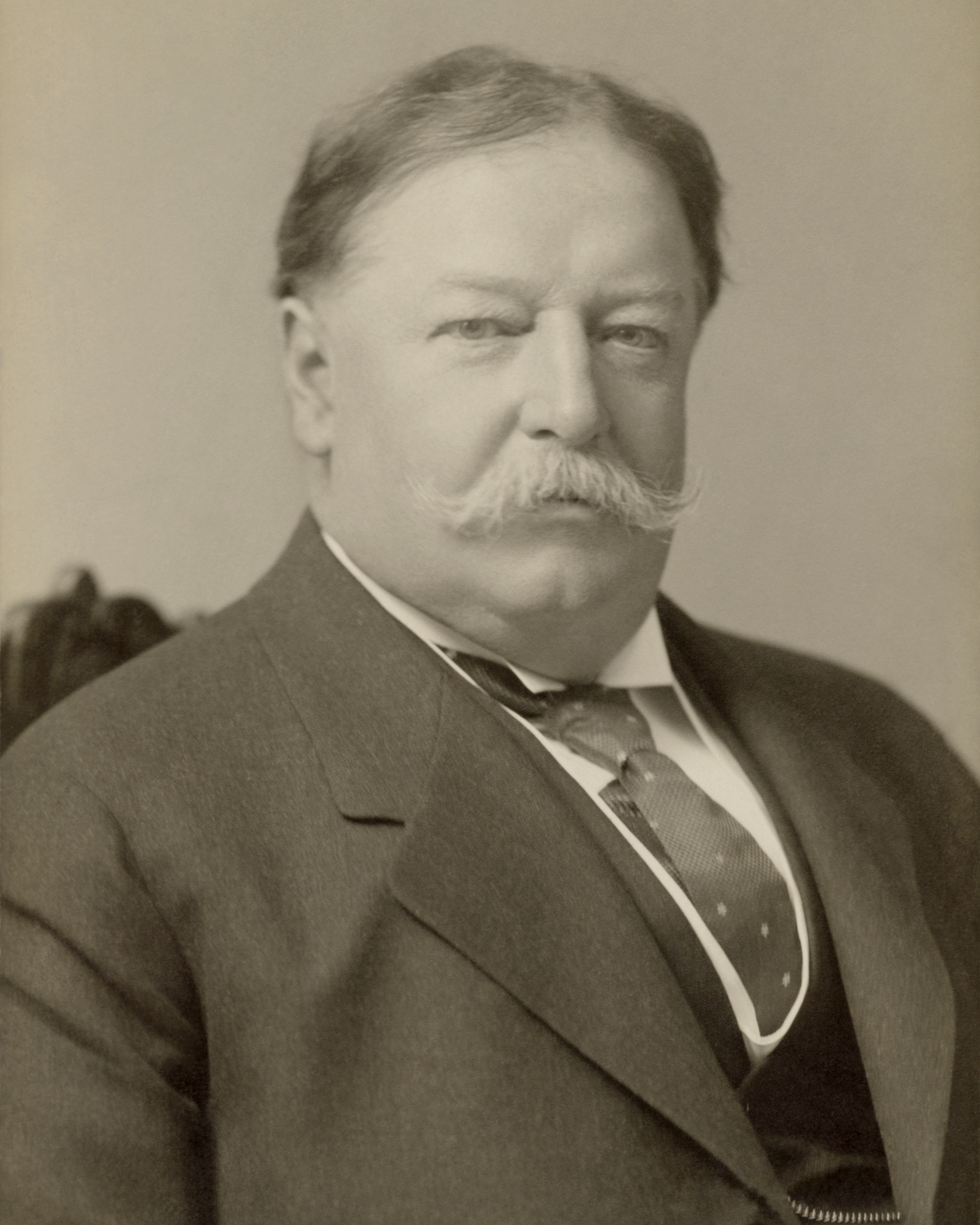
- Taft in 1908

27th President of the United States
- In office March 4, 1909 – March 4, 1913
- Vice President: James S. Sherman (1909–1912); Vacant (1912–1913) (Note: Vice President Sherman died in office. As this was prior to the adoption of the Twenty-fifth Amendment in 1967, a vacancy in the office of vice president was not filled until the next election and inauguration.)
- Preceded by: Theodore Roosevelt
- Succeeded by: Woodrow Wilson

10th Chief Justice of the United States
- In office July 11, 1921 – February 3, 1930
- Nominated by: Warren G. Harding
- Preceded by: Edward Douglass White
- Succeeded by: Charles Evans Hughes

42nd United States Secretary of War
- In office February 1, 1904 – June 30, 1908
- President: Theodore Roosevelt
- Deputy: Robert Shaw Oliver
- Preceded by: Elihu Root
- Succeeded by: Luke Edward Wright

1st Provisional Governor of Cuba
- In office September 29, 1906 – October 13, 1906
- Appointed by: Theodore Roosevelt
- Preceded by: Tomás Estrada Palma (as President)
- Succeeded by: Charles Edward Magoon

Governor-General of the Philippines
- In office March 16, 1900 – December 23, 1903
- Appointed by: William McKinley
- Deputy: Elwell S. Otis; Arthur MacArthur Jr. Adna Chaffee; Luke Edward Wright
- Preceded by: Jacob Gould Schurman (as Chairman of the First Philippine Commission)
- Succeeded by: Luke Edward Wright

Judge of the United States Court of Appeals for the Sixth Circuit
- In office March 17, 1892 – March 15, 1900
- Appointed by: Benjamin Harrison
- Preceded by: Seat established
- Succeeded by: Henry Franklin Severens

6th Solicitor General of the United States
- In office February 4, 1890 – March 20, 1892
- President: Benjamin Harrison
- Preceded by: Orlow W. Chapman
- Succeeded by: Charles H. Aldrich

Personal details
- Born: September 15, 1857 Cincinnati, Ohio, U.S.
- Died: March 8, 1930 (aged 72) Washington, D.C., U.S.
- Resting place: Arlington National Cemetery
- Party: Republican
- Spouse: Helen Herron (m. 1886)
- Children: Robert; Helen; Charles II
- Parents: Alphonso Taft; Louise Torrey
- Relatives: Taft family
- Education: Yale University (BA); University of Cincinnati (LLB)
- Occupation: Politician; lawyer
- William Howard Taft's voice Taft on the abolition of war Recorded October 1, 1912

William Howard Taft (September 15, 1857 – March 8, 1930) was the 27th president of the United States from 1909 to 1913 and the tenth chief justice of the United States from 1921 to 1930. He is the only person to have held both offices.

Taft was born in Cincinnati, Ohio. His father, Alphonso Taft, was a U.S. attorney general and secretary of war. Taft attended Yale University and the Cincinnati Law School. After becoming a lawyer, he was appointed a judge while still in his twenties and continued a rapid rise, being named solicitor general and a judge of the Sixth Circuit Court of Appeals in the 1890s. President William McKinley appointed Taft civilian governor of the Philippines in 1901. President Theodore Roosevelt made him secretary of war in 1904, and he became Roosevelt's hand-picked successor. With Roosevelt's help, Taft easily won the Republican nomination for president in 1908 and defeated William Jennings Bryan for the presidency in the general election.

As president, Taft focused on East Asia more than European affairs and repeatedly intervened to prop up or remove Latin American governments. While Taft sought reductions to trade tariffs, the resulting bill was heavily influenced by special interests. His administration was filled with conflict between the Republican Party's conservative wing, with which Taft often sympathized, and its progressive wing, towards which Roosevelt increasingly gravitated. Controversies over conservation and antitrust cases filed by the Taft administration served to further separate the two men. The 1912 presidential election was a three-way race, as Roosevelt challenged Taft for renomination. Taft used his control of the party machinery to gain a bare majority of delegates and Roosevelt bolted the party. The split left Taft with little chance of reelection, and he took only Utah and Vermont in his loss to Democratic nominee Woodrow Wilson.

After leaving office, Taft returned to Yale as a professor, continuing his political activity and working against war through the League to Enforce Peace. Despite his personal ambition to become chief justice, Taft had previously declined repeated offers of appointment to the Supreme Court of the United States, believing his political work to be more important. In 1921, President Warren G. Harding appointed Taft chief justice. As a member of the court, he was a conservative on business issues, and under him there were advances in individual rights. His work towards administrative reform of the court culminated in the Judiciary Act of 1925. In poor health, he resigned in February 1930, and died the following month. He was buried at Arlington National Cemetery, the first president and first Supreme Court justice to be interred there.

Taft is generally listed near the middle in historians' rankings of U.S. presidents; his work as chief justice has been evaluated more positively. In popular memory his political achievements and role in Republican Party history have been overshadowed by his weight and physical appearance.

== Early life and education ==
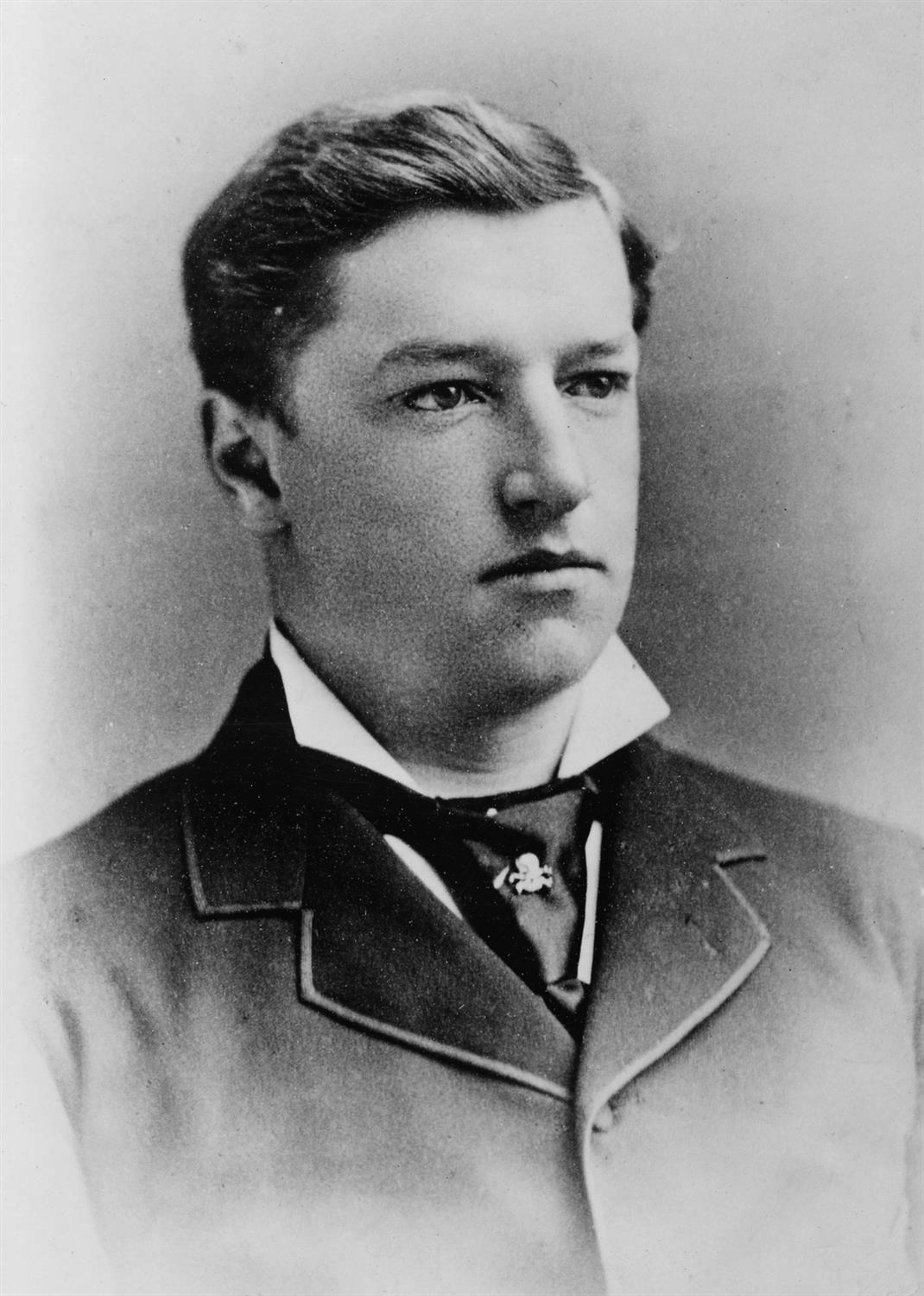
Yale College photograph of Taft, c. 1878

William Howard Taft was born September 15, 1857, in Cincinnati, Ohio, to Alphonso Taft and Louise Torrey. The Taft family lived in the suburb of Mount Auburn. Alphonso served as a judge and an ambassador, and was U.S. Secretary of War and Attorney General under President Ulysses S. Grant.

William Taft was not seen as brilliant as a child, but was a hard worker; his demanding parents pushed him and his four brothers toward success, tolerating nothing less. He attended Woodward High School in Cincinnati. At Yale College, which he entered in 1874, the heavyset, jovial Taft was popular and an intramural heavyweight wrestling champion. One classmate said he succeeded through hard work rather than by being the smartest, and had integrity. He was elected a member of Skull and Bones, the Yale secret society co-founded by his father, one of three future presidents (with George H. W. Bush and George W. Bush) to be a member.

In 1878, Taft graduated second in his class of 121. He attended Cincinnati Law School, and graduated with a Bachelor of Laws in 1880. While in law school, he worked on The Cincinnati Commercial newspaper, edited by Murat Halstead. Taft was assigned to cover the local courts, and also spent time reading law in his father's office; both activities gave him practical knowledge of the law that was not taught in class. Shortly before graduating from law school, Taft went to Columbus to take the bar examination and easily passed.

== Rise in government (1880–1908) ==
=== Ohio lawyer and judge ===
After admission to the Ohio bar, Taft devoted himself to his job at the Commercial full-time. Halstead was willing to take him on permanently at an increased salary if he would give up the law, but Taft declined. In October 1880, Taft was appointed assistant prosecutor for Hamilton County, Ohio, where Cincinnati is. He took office in January 1881. Taft served for a year as assistant prosecutor, trying his share of routine cases. He resigned in January 1882 after President Chester A. Arthur appointed him Collector of Internal Revenue for Ohio's First District, an area centered on Cincinnati. Taft refused to dismiss competent employees who were politically out of favor, and resigned effective in March 1883, writing to Arthur that he wished to begin private practice in Cincinnati. In 1884, Taft campaigned for the Republican candidate for president, Senator James G. Blaine of Maine, who lost to Governor Grover Cleveland of New York.

In 1887, Taft, then aged 29, was appointed to a vacancy on the Superior Court of Cincinnati by Governor Joseph B. Foraker. The appointment was good for just over a year, after which he would have to face the voters, and in April 1888, he sought election for the first of three times in his lifetime, the other two being for the presidency. He was elected to a full five-year term. Some two dozen of Taft's opinions as a state judge survive, the most significant being Moores & Co. v. Bricklayers' Union No. 1 (Note: 1889 Ohio Misc. Lexis 119, 10 Ohio Dec. reprint 181) (1889) if only because it was used against him when he ran for president in 1908. The case involved bricklayers who refused to work for any firm that dealt with a company called Parker Brothers, with which they were in dispute. Taft ruled that the union's action amounted to a secondary boycott, which was illegal.

It is not clear when Taft met Helen Herron (often called Nellie), but it was no later than 1880, when she mentioned in her diary receiving an invitation to a party from him. By 1884, they were meeting regularly, and in 1885, after an initial rejection, she agreed to marry him. The wedding took place at the Herron home on June 19, 1886. William Taft remained devoted to his wife throughout their almost 44 years of marriage. Nellie Taft pushed her husband much as his parents had, and she could be very frank with her criticisms. The couple had three children, of whom the eldest, Robert, became a U.S. senator.

=== Solicitor General ===
The death of Justice Stanley Matthews created a vacancy on the US Supreme Court in 1889, and Governor Foraker suggested President Harrison appoint Taft to fill it. Taft was 32 and his professional goal was always a seat on the Supreme Court. He actively sought the appointment, writing to Foraker to urge the governor to press his case, while stating to others it was unlikely he would get it. Instead, in 1890, Harrison appointed him Solicitor General of the United States. When Taft arrived in Washington in February 1890, the office had been vacant for two months, with the work piling up. He worked to eliminate the backlog, while simultaneously educating himself on federal law and procedure he had not needed as an Ohio state judge.

New York Senator William M. Evarts, a former US Secretary of State, had been a classmate of Alphonso Taft at Yale. (Note: Alphonso Taft died in 1891 in California, retired because of illness contracted during his diplomatic postings. See Pringle vol 1, p. 119.) Evarts called to see his friend's son as soon as Taft took office, and William and Nellie Taft were launched into Washington society. Nellie Taft was ambitious for herself and her husband, and was annoyed when the people he socialized with most were mainly Supreme Court justices, rather than the arbiters of Washington society such as Theodore Roosevelt, John Hay, Henry Cabot Lodge, and their wives.

In 1891, Taft introduced a new policy: confession of error, by which the U.S. government would concede a case in the Supreme Court that it had won in the court below, but which the solicitor general thought it should have lost. At Taft's request, the Supreme Court reversed a murder conviction that Taft said had been based on inadmissible evidence. The policy continues to this day.

Although Taft was successful as Solicitor General, winning 15 of the 18 cases he argued before the Supreme Court, he was glad when in March 1891, the United States Congress created a new judgeship for each of the United States Courts of Appeal, and Harrison appointed him to the Sixth Circuit, based in Cincinnati. In March 1892, Taft resigned as Solicitor General to resume his judicial career.

=== Federal judge ===
Taft's federal judgeship was a lifetime appointment, and one from which promotion to the Supreme Court might come. Taft's older half-brother Charles, successful in business, supplemented Taft's government salary, allowing William and Nellie Taft and their family to live in comfort. Taft's duties involved hearing trials in the circuit, which included Ohio, Michigan, Kentucky, and Tennessee, and participating with Supreme Court Justice John Marshall Harlan, the circuit justice, and judges of the Sixth Circuit in hearing appeals. Taft spent these years, from 1892 to 1900, in personal and professional contentment.

According to historian Louis L. Gould, "while Taft shared the fears about social unrest that dominated the middle classes during the 1890s, he was not as conservative as his critics believed. He supported the right of labor to organize and strike, and he ruled against employers in several negligence cases." Among these was Voight v. Baltimore & Ohio Southwestern Railway Co. (Note: 79 F. 561 (6th Cir. 1897)) Taft's decision for a worker injured in a railway accident violated the contemporary doctrine of liberty of contract, and he was reversed by the Supreme Court. (Note: Baltimore & Ohio Southwestern Railway Co. v. Voight, 176 U.S. 498 (1900). Only Justice Harlan dissented from the opinion for the Court written by Justice George Shiras. See Lurie, pp. 33–34.) On the other hand, Taft's opinion in United States v. Addyston Pipe and Steel Co. (Note: 85 F. 271 (6th Cir. 1898)) was upheld unanimously by the high court. (Note: 175 U.S. 211 (1899)) Taft's opinion, in which he held that a pipe manufacturers' association had violated the Sherman Antitrust Act, was described by Henry Pringle, his biographer, as having "definitely and specifically revived" that legislation.

In 1896, Taft became dean and Professor of Property at his alma mater, Cincinnati Law School, a post that required him to prepare and give two hour-long lectures each week. He was devoted to his law school, and was deeply committed to legal education, introducing the case method to the curriculum. As a federal judge, Taft could not involve himself with politics, but followed it closely, remaining a Republican supporter. He watched with some disbelief as the campaign of Ohio Governor William McKinley developed in 1894 and 1895, writing "I cannot find anybody in Washington who wants him". By March 1896, Taft realized that McKinley would likely be nominated, and was lukewarm in his support. He landed solidly in McKinley's camp in July, after former Nebraska US Representative William Jennings Bryan stampeded the 1896 Democratic National Convention with his Cross of Gold speech and was nominated. Bryan, in both that speech and in his campaign, strongly advocated free silver, a policy that Taft saw as economic radicalism. Taft feared that people would hoard gold in anticipation of a Bryan victory, but he could do nothing but worry. McKinley was elected; when a place on the Supreme Court opened in 1898, the only one under McKinley, the president named Joseph McKenna.

From the 1890s until his death, Taft played a major role in the international legal community. He was active in many organizations, was a leader in the worldwide arbitration movement, and taught international law at the Yale Law School. Taft advocated the establishment of a world court of arbitration supported by an international police force and is considered a major proponent of "world peace through law" movement. One of the reasons for his bitter break with Roosevelt in 1910–12 was Roosevelt's insistence that arbitration was naïve and that only war could decide major international disputes.

=== Philippine years ===
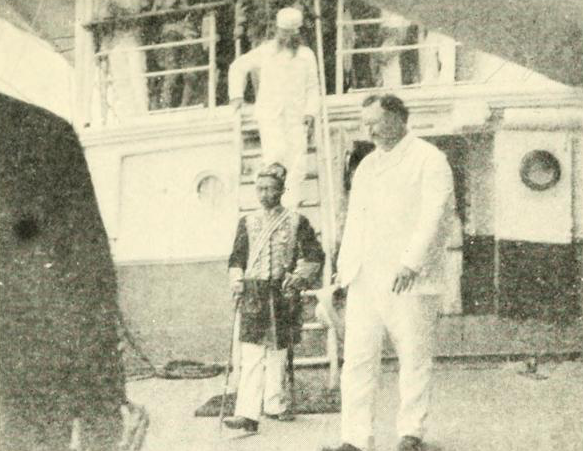
Sultan Jamalul Kiram II with William Howard Taft of the Philippine Commission in Jolo, Sulu (March 27, 1901)

In January 1900, Taft was called to Washington to meet with McKinley. Taft hoped a Supreme Court appointment was in the works, but instead McKinley wanted to place Taft on the commission to organize a civilian government in the Philippines. The appointment would require Taft's resignation from the bench; the president assured him that if he fulfilled this task, McKinley would appoint him to the next vacancy on the high court. Taft accepted on condition he was made head of the commission, with responsibility for success or failure; McKinley agreed, and Taft sailed for the islands in April 1900.

The American takeover meant the Philippine Revolution bled into the Philippine–American War, as Filipinos fought for their independence, but U.S. forces, led by military governor General Arthur MacArthur Jr. (Note: His son, Douglas MacArthur, would also become a general and famously fight in the Philippines.) had the upper hand by 1900. MacArthur felt the commission was a nuisance, and their mission a quixotic attempt to impose self-government on a people unready for it. The general was forced to co-operate with Taft, as McKinley had given the commission control over the islands' military budget. The commission took executive power in the Philippines on September 1, 1900; on July 4, 1901, Taft became civilian governor. MacArthur, until then the military governor, was relieved by General Adna Chaffee, who was designated only as commander of American forces. As Governor-General, Taft oversaw the final months of the primary phase of the Philippine–American War. He approved of General James Franklin Bell's use of concentration camps in the provinces of Batangas and Laguna, and accepted the surrender of Filipino general Miguel Malvar on April 16, 1902.

Taft sought to make the Filipinos partners in a venture that would lead to their self-government; he saw independence as something decades off. Many Americans in the Philippines viewed the locals as racial inferiors, but Taft wrote soon before his arrival, "we propose to banish this idea from their minds". Taft did not impose racial segregation at official events, and treated the Filipinos as social equals. Nellie Taft recalled that "neither politics nor race should influence our hospitality in any way".

McKinley was assassinated in September 1901, and was succeeded by Theodore Roosevelt. Taft and Roosevelt had first become friends around 1890 while Taft was Solicitor General and Roosevelt a member of the United States Civil Service Commission. Taft had, after McKinley's election, urged the appointment of Roosevelt as Assistant Secretary of the Navy, and watched as Roosevelt became a war hero, Governor of New York, and Vice President of the United States. They met again when Taft went to Washington in January 1902 to recuperate after two operations caused by an infection. There, Taft testified before the Senate Committee on the Philippines. Taft wanted Filipino farmers to have a stake in the new government through land ownership, but much of the arable land was held by Catholic religious orders of mostly Spanish priests, which were often resented by the Filipinos. Roosevelt had Taft go to Rome to negotiate with Pope Leo XIII, to purchase the lands and to arrange the withdrawal of the Spanish priests, with Americans replacing them and training locals as clergy. Taft did not succeed in resolving these issues on his visit to Rome, but an agreement on both points was made in 1903.

=== Secretary of War ===
In late 1902, Taft had heard from Roosevelt that a seat on the Supreme Court would soon fall vacant on the resignation of Justice George Shiras, and Roosevelt desired that Taft fill it. Although this was Taft's professional goal, he refused as he felt his work as governor was not yet done. The following year, Roosevelt asked Taft to become Secretary of War. As the War Department administered the Philippines, Taft would remain responsible for the islands, and Elihu Root, the incumbent, was willing to postpone his departure until 1904, allowing Taft time to wrap up his work in Manila. After consulting with his family, Taft agreed, and sailed for the United States in December 1903.

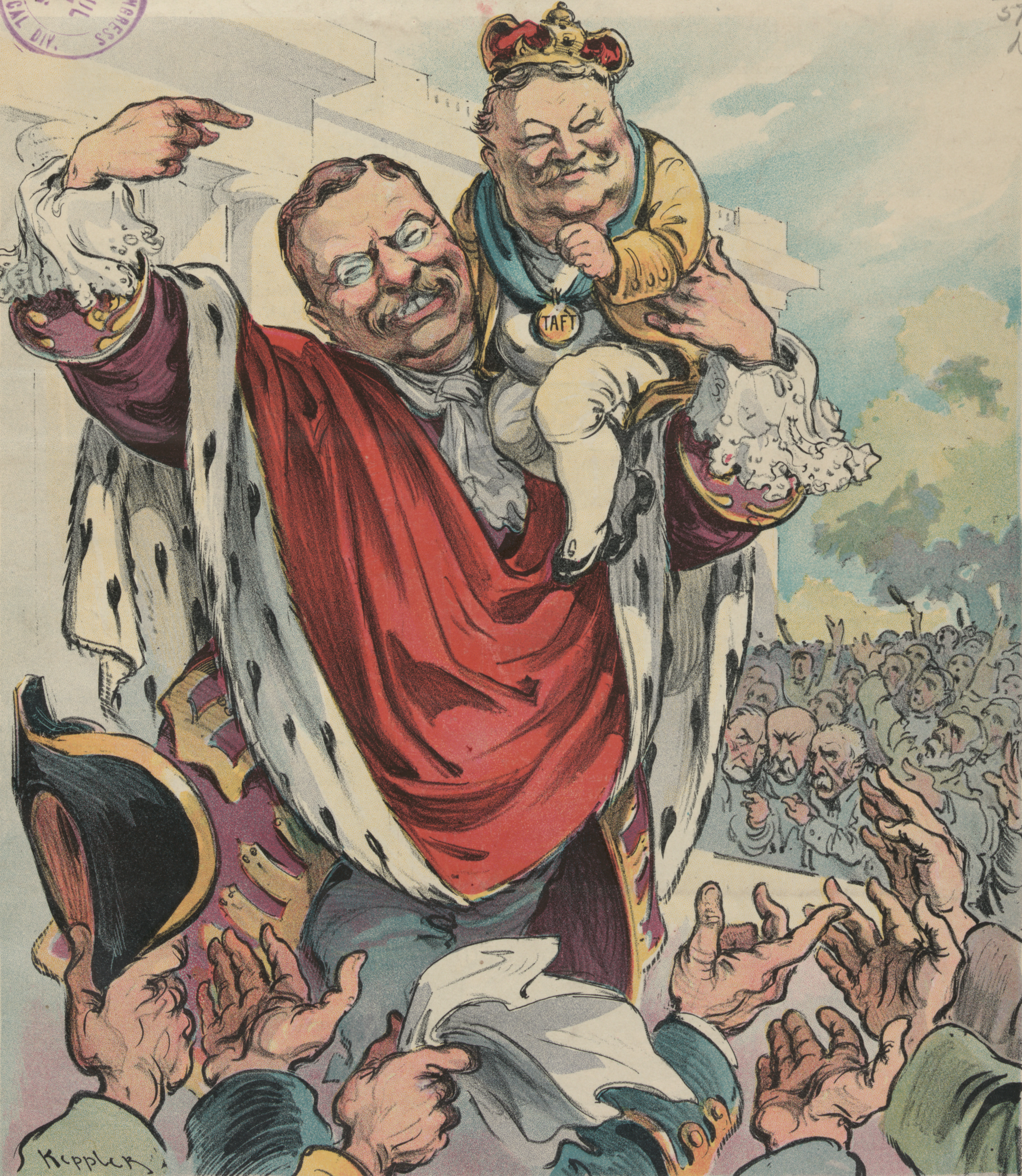
Roosevelt introduces Taft as his crown prince: Puck magazine cover cartoon, 1906.

When Taft took office as Secretary of War in January 1904, he was not called upon to spend much time administering the army, which the president was content to do himself—Roosevelt wanted Taft as a troubleshooter in difficult situations, as a legal adviser, and to be able to give campaign speeches as he sought election in his own right. Taft strongly defended Roosevelt's record in his addresses, and wrote of the president's successful but strenuous efforts to gain election, "I would not run for president if you guaranteed the office. It is awful to be afraid of one's shadow."

Between 1905 and 1907, Taft came to terms with the likelihood he would be the next Republican nominee for president, though he did not plan to actively campaign for it. When Justice Henry Billings Brown resigned in 1906, Taft would not accept the seat although Roosevelt offered it, a position Taft held to when another seat opened in 1906. Edith Roosevelt, the First Lady, disliked the growing closeness between the two men, feeling that they were too much alike and that the president did not gain much from the advice of someone who rarely contradicted him.

Alternatively, Taft wanted to be chief justice, and kept a close eye on the health of the aging incumbent, Melville Fuller, who turned 75 in 1908. Taft believed Fuller likely to live many years. Roosevelt had indicated he was likely to appoint Taft if the opportunity came to fill the court's center seat, but some considered Attorney General Philander Knox a better candidate. In any event, Fuller remained chief justice throughout Roosevelt's presidency. (Note: Fuller's longevity was a source of frustration and some humor in the Roosevelt White House. Secretary Root originated a running joke that Fuller would be found alive and clinging to his seat on the Day of Judgment, and would then have to be shot. See Anderson 2000, p. 328.)

Through the 1903 separation of Panama from Colombia and the Hay–Bunau-Varilla Treaty, the United States had secured rights to build a canal in the Isthmus of Panama. Legislation authorizing construction did not specify which government department would be responsible, and Roosevelt designated the Department of War. Taft journeyed to Panama in 1904, viewing the canal site and meeting with Panamanian officials. The Isthmian Canal Commission had trouble keeping a chief engineer, and when in February 1907 John F. Stevens submitted his resignation, Taft recommended an army engineer, George W. Goethals. Under Goethals, the project moved ahead smoothly.

Another colony lost by Spain in 1898 was Cuba, but as freedom for Cuba had been a major purpose of the war, it was not annexed by the U.S., but was, after a period of occupation, given independence in 1902. Election fraud and corruption followed, as did factional conflict. In September 1906, President Tomás Estrada Palma asked for U.S. intervention. Taft traveled to Cuba with a small American force, and on September 29, 1906, under the terms of the Cuban–American Treaty of Relations of 1903, declared himself Provisional Governor of Cuba, a post he held for two weeks before being succeeded by Charles Edward Magoon. In his time in Cuba, Taft worked to persuade Cubans that the U.S. intended stability, not occupation.

Taft remained involved in Philippine affairs. During Roosevelt's election campaign in 1904, he urged that Philippine agricultural products be admitted to the U.S. without duty. This caused growers of U.S. sugar and tobacco to complain to Roosevelt, who remonstrated with his Secretary of War. Taft expressed unwillingness to change his position, and threatened to resign; Roosevelt hastily dropped the matter. Taft returned to the islands in 1905, leading a delegation of congressmen, and again in 1907, to open the first Philippine Assembly.

On both of his Philippine trips as Secretary of War, Taft went to Japan, and met with officials there. The meeting in July 1905 came a month before the Portsmouth Peace Conference, which would end the Russo-Japanese War with the Treaty of Portsmouth. Taft met with Japanese prime minister Katsura Tarō. After that meeting, the two signed a memorandum. It contained nothing new but instead reaffirmed official positions: Japan had no intention to invade the Philippines, and the U.S. that it did not object to Japanese control of Korea. There were U.S. concerns about the number of Japanese laborers coming to the American West Coast, and during Taft's second visit, in September 1907, Tadasu Hayashi, the foreign minister, informally agreed to issue fewer passports to them.

== Presidential election of 1908 ==
=== Gaining the nomination ===
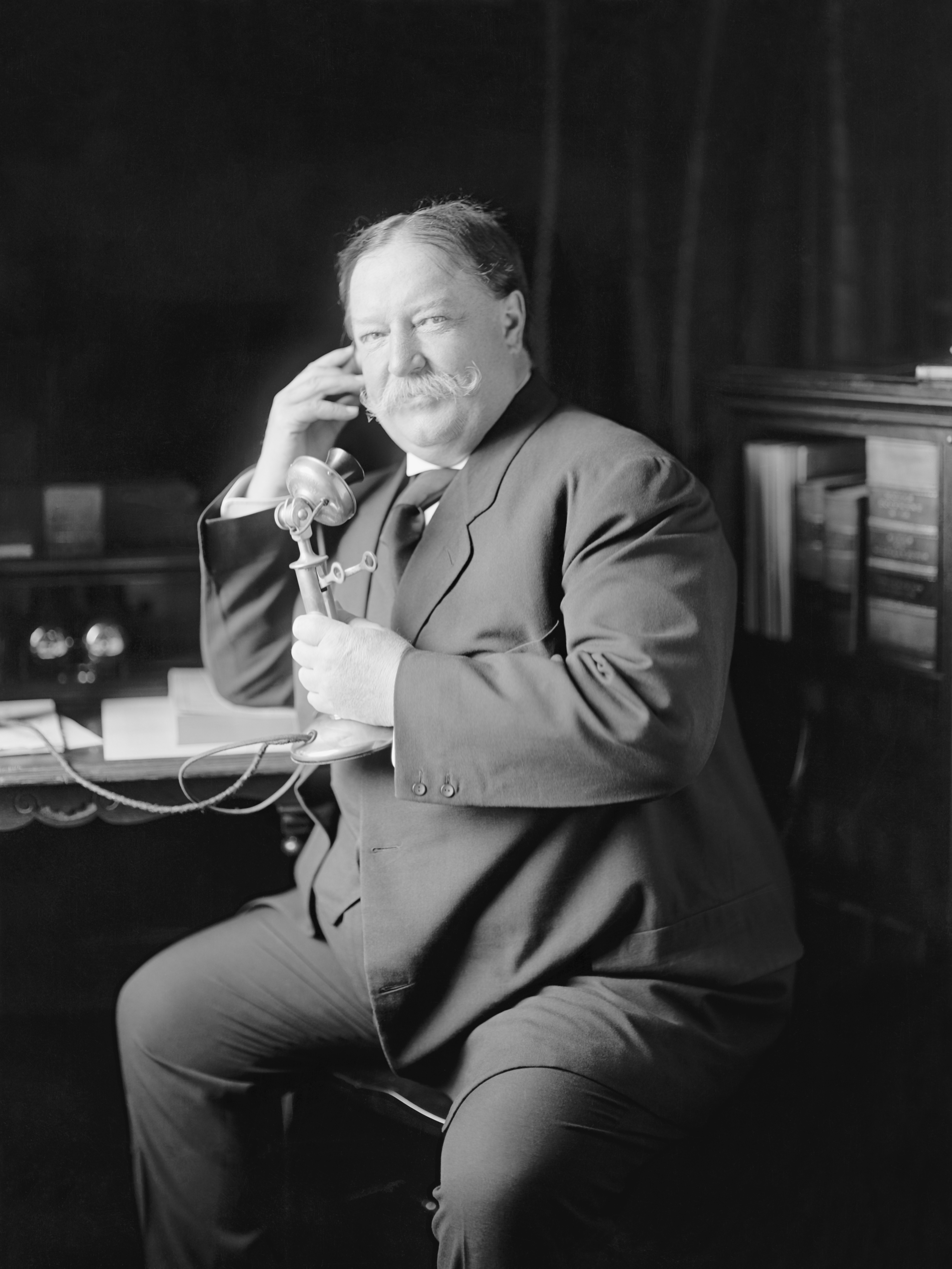
One of a series of candid photographs known as the Evolution of a Smile, taken just after a formal portrait session, as Taft learned in a telephone call from Roosevelt of his nomination for president

Roosevelt had served almost three and a half years of McKinley's term. On the night of his own election in 1904, Roosevelt publicly declared that he would not run for reelection in 1908, a pledge he quickly regretted. But he felt bound by his word. Roosevelt believed Taft was his logical successor, although the War Secretary had initially been reluctant to run. Roosevelt used his control of the party machinery to aid his heir apparent. On pain of the loss of their jobs, political appointees were required to support Taft or remain silent.

A number of Republican politicians, such as Treasury Secretary George Cortelyou, tested the waters for a run but chose to stay out. New York Governor Charles Evans Hughes ran, but when he made a major policy speech, Roosevelt the same day sent a special message to Congress warning in strong terms against corporate corruption. The resulting coverage of the presidential message relegated Hughes to the back pages. Roosevelt reluctantly deterred repeated attempts to draft him for another term.

Assistant Postmaster General Frank H. Hitchcock resigned from his office in February 1908 to lead the Taft effort. In April, Taft made a speaking tour, traveling as far west as Omaha before being recalled to straighten out a contested election in Panama. He had no serious opposition at the 1908 Republican National Convention in Chicago in June, and gained a first-ballot victory. Yet Taft did not have things his own way: he had hoped his running mate would be a midwestern progressive like Iowa senator Jonathan Dolliver, but instead the convention named Congressman James S. Sherman of New York, a conservative. Taft resigned as Secretary of War on June 30 to devote himself full-time to the campaign.

=== General election campaign ===
Taft's opponent in the general election was William Jennings Bryan, the Democratic nominee for the third time in four presidential elections. As many of Roosevelt's reforms stemmed from proposals by Bryan, the Democrat argued that he was the true heir to Roosevelt's mantle. Corporate contributions to federal political campaigns had been outlawed by the 1907 Tillman Act, and Bryan proposed that contributions by officers and directors of corporations be similarly banned, or at least disclosed when made. Taft was only willing to see the contributions disclosed after the election, and tried to ensure that officers and directors of corporations litigating with the government were not among his contributors.

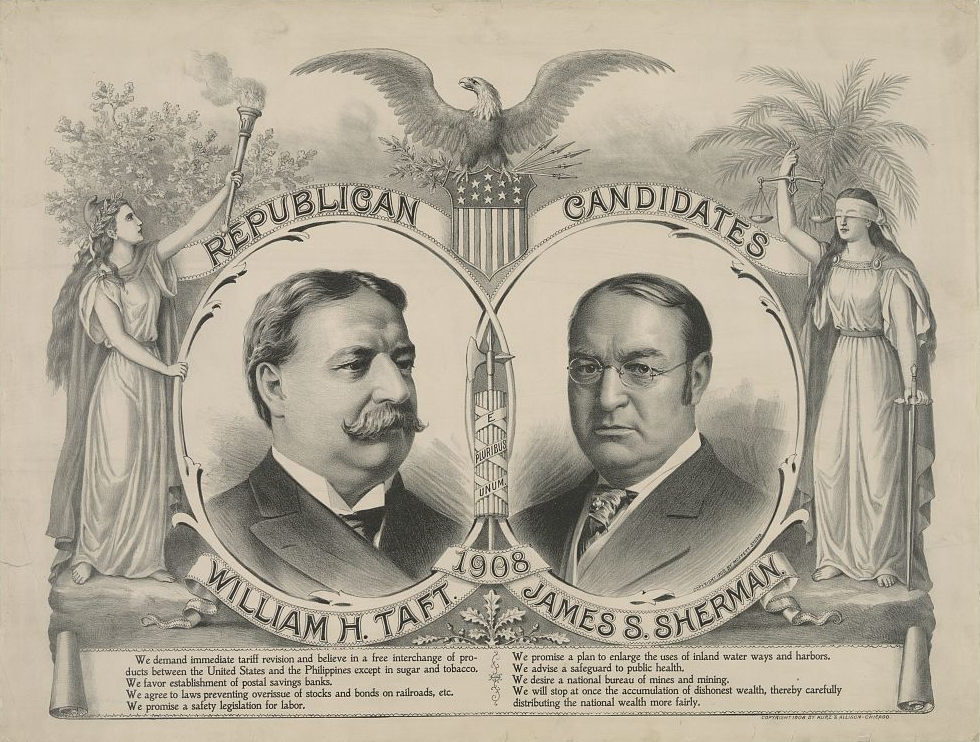
1908 Taft/Sherman poster

Taft began the campaign on the wrong foot, fueling the arguments of those who said he was not his own man by traveling to Roosevelt's home at Sagamore Hill for advice on his acceptance speech, saying that he needed "the President's judgment and criticism". Taft supported most of Roosevelt's policies. He argued that labor had a right to organize, but not boycott, and that corporations and the wealthy must also obey the law. Bryan wanted the railroads to be owned by the government, but Taft preferred that they remain in the private sector, with their maximum rates set by the Interstate Commerce Commission, subject to judicial review. Taft attributed blame for the recent recession, the Panic of 1907, to stock speculation and other abuses, and felt some reform of the currency (the U.S. was on the gold standard) was needed to allow flexibility in the government's response to poor economic times, that specific legislation on trusts was needed to supplement the Sherman Antitrust Act, and that the constitution should be amended to allow for an income tax, thus overruling decisions of the Supreme Court striking such a tax down. Roosevelt's expansive use of executive power had been controversial; Taft proposed to continue his policies, but place them on more solid legal underpinnings through the passage of legislation.

Taft upset some progressives by choosing Frank Harris Hitchcock as chairman of the Republican National Committee (RNC), placing him in charge of the presidential campaign. Hitchcock was quick to bring in men closely allied with big business. Taft took an August vacation in Hot Springs, Virginia, where he irritated political advisors by spending more time on golf than strategy. After seeing a newspaper photo of Taft taking a large swing at a golf ball, Roosevelt warned him against candid shots.

1908 electoral vote results

Roosevelt, frustrated by his own relative inaction, showered Taft with advice, fearing that the electorate would not appreciate Taft's qualities, and that Bryan would win. Roosevelt's supporters spread rumors that the president was in effect running Taft's campaign. This annoyed Nellie Taft, who never trusted the Roosevelts. Nevertheless, Roosevelt supported the Republican nominee with such enthusiasm that humorists suggested "TAFT" stood for "Take advice from Theodore".

Bryan urged a system of bank guarantees, so that depositors could be repaid if banks failed, but Taft opposed this, offering a postal savings system instead. The issue of prohibition of alcohol entered the campaign when in mid-September, Carrie Nation called on Taft and demanded to know his views. Taft and Roosevelt had agreed the party platform would take no position on the matter, and Nation left indignant, to allege that Taft was irreligious and against temperance. Taft, at Roosevelt's advice, ignored the issue.

In the end, Taft won by a comfortable margin. Taft defeated Bryan by 321 electoral votes to 162; however, he garnered just 51.6 percent of the popular vote. Nellie Taft said regarding the campaign, "There was nothing to criticize, except his not knowing or caring about the way the game of politics is played." Longtime White House usher Ike Hoover recalled that Taft came often to see Roosevelt during the campaign, but seldom between the election and Inauguration Day, March 4, 1909.

On February 18, 1909, after his election but before his inauguration, Taft was recognized as a Mason at sight at the Scottish Rite Cathedral in Cincinnati.

== Presidency (1909–1913) ==
=== Inauguration and appointments ===
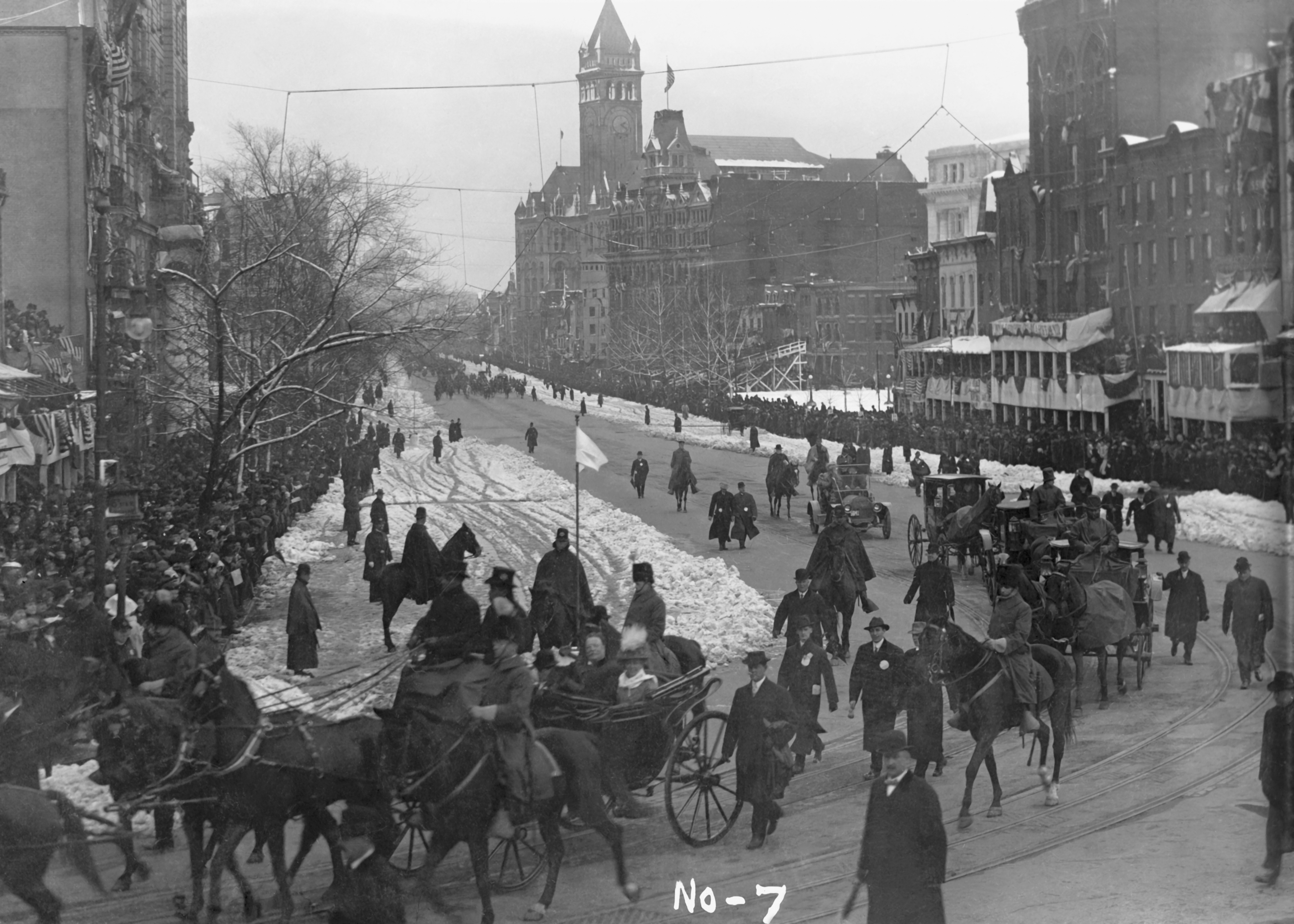
1909 inauguration

Taft was sworn in as president on March 4, 1909. Due to a winter storm that coated Washington with ice, Taft was inaugurated within the Senate Chamber rather than outside the Capitol as is customary. The new president stated in his inaugural address that he had been honored to have been "one of the advisers of my distinguished predecessor" and to have had a part "in the reforms he has initiated. I should be untrue to myself, to my promises, and to the declarations of the party platform on which I was elected if I did not make the maintenance and enforcement of those reforms a most important feature of my administration". He pledged to make those reforms long-lasting, ensuring that honest businessmen did not suffer uncertainty through change of policy. He spoke of the need to reduce the 1897 Dingley tariff, of the need for antitrust reform, and for continued advancement of the Philippines toward full self-government. Roosevelt left office with regret that his tenure in the position he enjoyed so much was over and, to keep out of Taft's way, arranged for a year-long hunting trip to Africa.

Soon after the Republican convention, Taft and Roosevelt had discussed which cabinet officers would stay on. Taft kept only Agriculture Secretary James Wilson and Postmaster General George von Lengerke Meyer (who was transferred to the Navy Department). Others appointed to the Taft cabinet included Philander Knox, who had served under McKinley and Roosevelt as Attorney General, as the new Secretary of State, and Franklin MacVeagh as Treasury Secretary.

Taft did not enjoy the easy relationship with the press that Roosevelt had, choosing not to offer himself for interviews or photo opportunities as often as his predecessor had. His administration marked a change in style from the charismatic leadership of Roosevelt to Taft's quieter passion for the rule of law.

=== First Lady's illness ===
Early in Taft's term, in May 1909, his wife Nellie had a severe stroke that left her paralyzed in one arm and one leg and deprived her of the power of speech. Taft spent several hours each day looking after her and teaching her to speak again, which took a year.

=== Foreign policy ===
==== Organization and principles ====
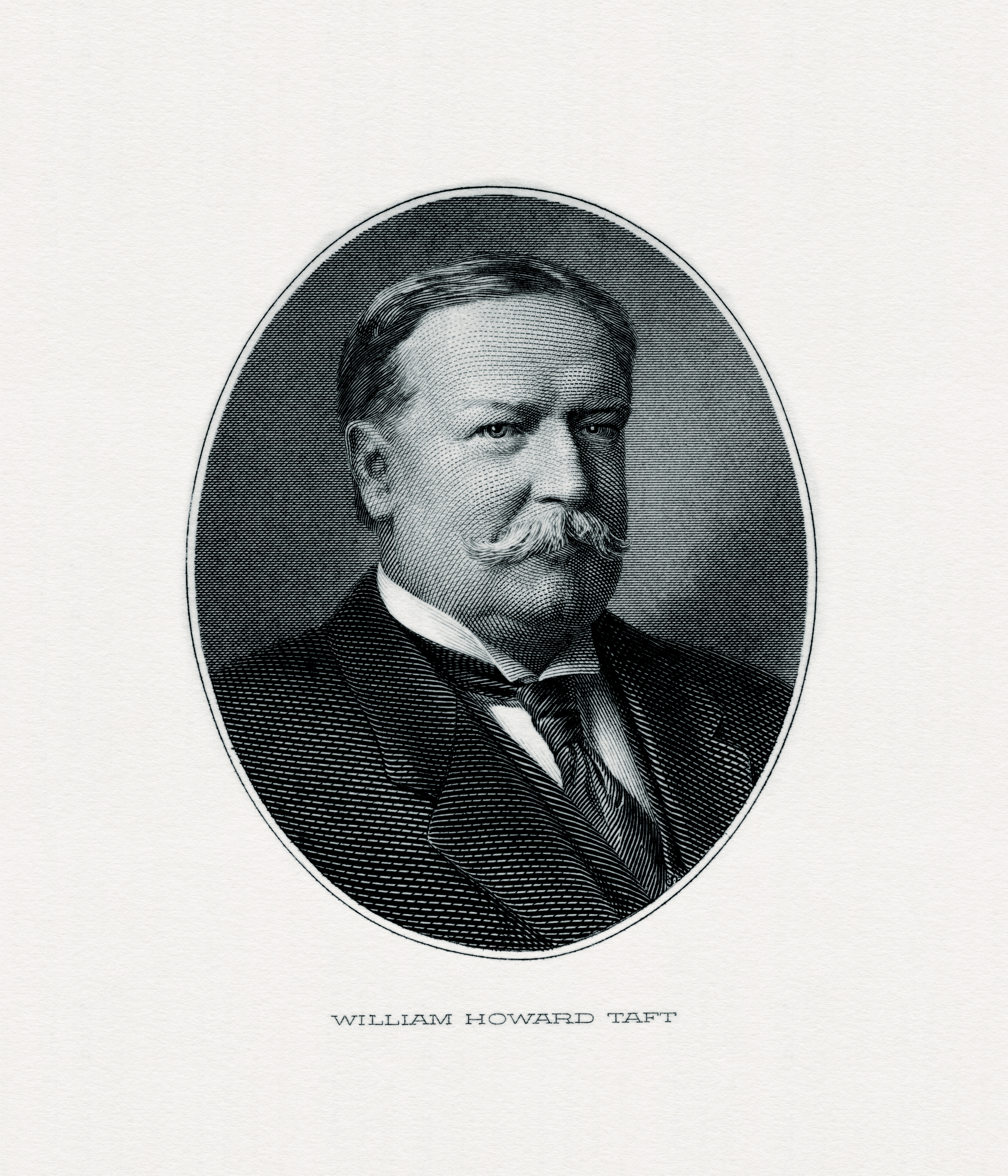
BEP engraved portrait of Taft as President

Taft made it a priority to restructure the State Department, noting, "it is organized on the basis of the needs of the government in 1800 instead of 1900." The department was for the first time organized into geographical divisions, including desks for the Far East, Latin America and Western Europe. The department's first in-service training program was established, and appointees spent a month in Washington before going to their posts. Taft and Secretary of State Knox had a strong relationship, and the president listened to his counsel on matters foreign and domestic. According to historian Paolo E. Coletta, Knox was not a good diplomat, and had poor relations with the Senate, press, and many foreign leaders, especially those from Latin America.

There was broad agreement between Taft and Knox on major foreign policy goals; the U.S. would not interfere in European affairs, and would use force if necessary to enforce the Monroe Doctrine in the Americas. The defense of the Panama Canal, which was under construction throughout Taft's term (it opened in 1914), guided United States foreign policy in the Caribbean and Central America. Previous administrations had made efforts to promote American business interests overseas, but Taft went a step further and used the web of American diplomats and consuls abroad to further trade. Such ties, Taft hoped, would promote world peace. Taft pushed for arbitration treaties with Great Britain and France, but the Senate was not willing to yield to arbitrators its constitutional prerogative to approve treaties.

==== Tariffs and reciprocity ====
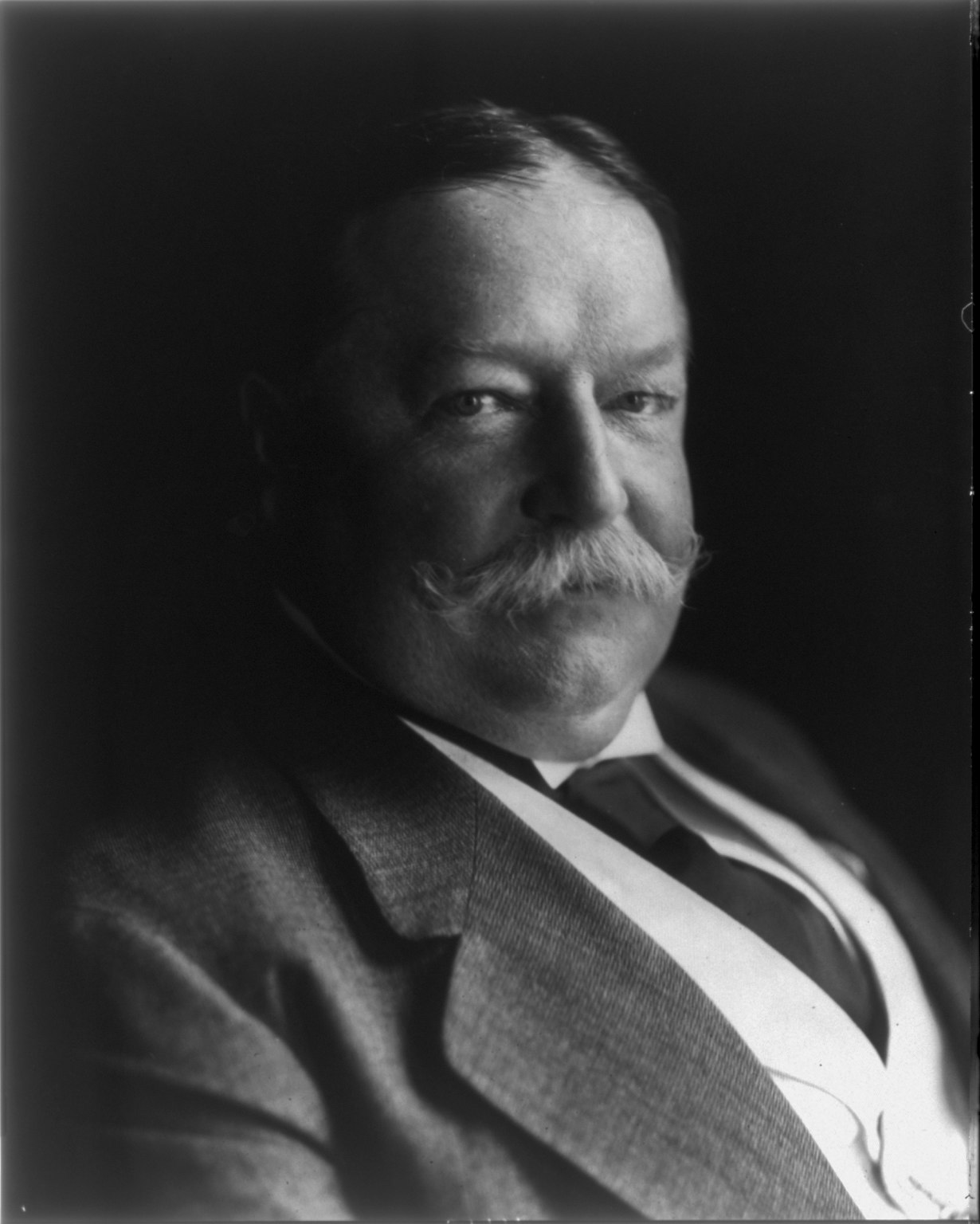
Taft in 1911

At the time of Taft's presidency, protectionism through the use of tariffs was a fundamental position of the Republican Party. The Dingley Act tariff had been enacted to protect American industry from foreign competition. The 1908 party platform had supported unspecified revisions to the Dingley Act, and Taft interpreted this to mean reduction. Taft called a special session of Congress to convene on March 15, 1909, to deal with the tariff question.

Sereno E. Payne, chairman of the House Ways and Means Committee, had held hearings in late 1908, and sponsored the resulting draft legislation. On balance, the bill reduced tariffs slightly, but when it passed the House in April 1909 and reached the Senate, the chairman of the Senate Finance Committee, Rhode Island senator Nelson W. Aldrich, attached many amendments raising rates. This outraged progressives such as Wisconsin's Robert M. La Follette, who urged Taft to say that the bill was not in accord with the party platform. Taft refused, angering them. Taft insisted that most imports from the Philippines be free of duty, and according to Anderson, showed effective leadership on a subject he was knowledgeable on and cared about.

When opponents sought to modify the tariff bill to allow for an income tax, Taft opposed it on the ground that the Supreme Court would likely strike it down as unconstitutional, as it had before. Instead, they proposed a constitutional amendment, which passed both houses in early July, was sent to the states, and by 1913 was ratified as the Sixteenth Amendment. In the conference committee, Taft won some victories, such as limiting the tax on lumber. The conference report passed both houses, and Taft signed it on August 6, 1909. The Payne-Aldrich tariff was immediately controversial. According to Coletta, "Taft had lost the initiative, and the wounds inflicted in the acrid tariff debate never healed".

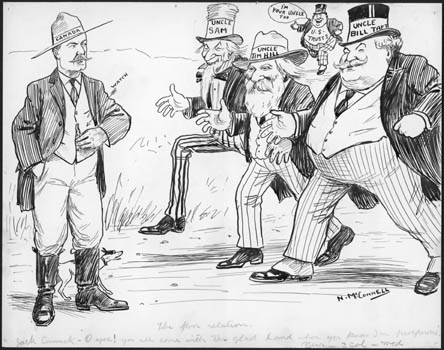
Newton McConnell cartoon showing Canadian suspicions that Taft and others were only interested in Canada when it was prosperous

In Taft's annual message sent to Congress in December 1910, he urged a free trade accord with Canada. Britain at that time still handled Canada's foreign relations, and Taft found the British and Canadian governments willing. Many in Canada opposed an accord, fearing the U.S. would dump it when it became inconvenient, as it had the 1854 Elgin-Marcy Treaty in 1866, and farm and fisheries interests in the United States were also opposed. After talks with Canadian officials in January 1911, Taft had the agreement, which was not a treaty, introduced into Congress. It passed in late July. The Parliament of Canada led by Prime Minister Sir Wilfrid Laurier had deadlocked over the issue. Canadians turned Laurier out of office in the September 1911 election and Robert Borden became the new prime minister. No cross-border agreement was concluded, and the debate deepened divisions within the Republican Party.

==== Latin America ====
Taft and his Secretary of State, Philander Knox, instituted a policy of Dollar Diplomacy toward Latin America, believing U.S. investment would benefit all involved, while diminishing European influence in regions where the Monroe Doctrine applied. The policy was unpopular among Latin American states that did not wish to become financial protectorates of the United States, as well as in the U.S. Senate, many of whose members believed the U.S. should not interfere abroad. No foreign affairs controversy tested Taft's policy more than the collapse of the Mexican regime and subsequent turmoil of the Mexican Revolution.

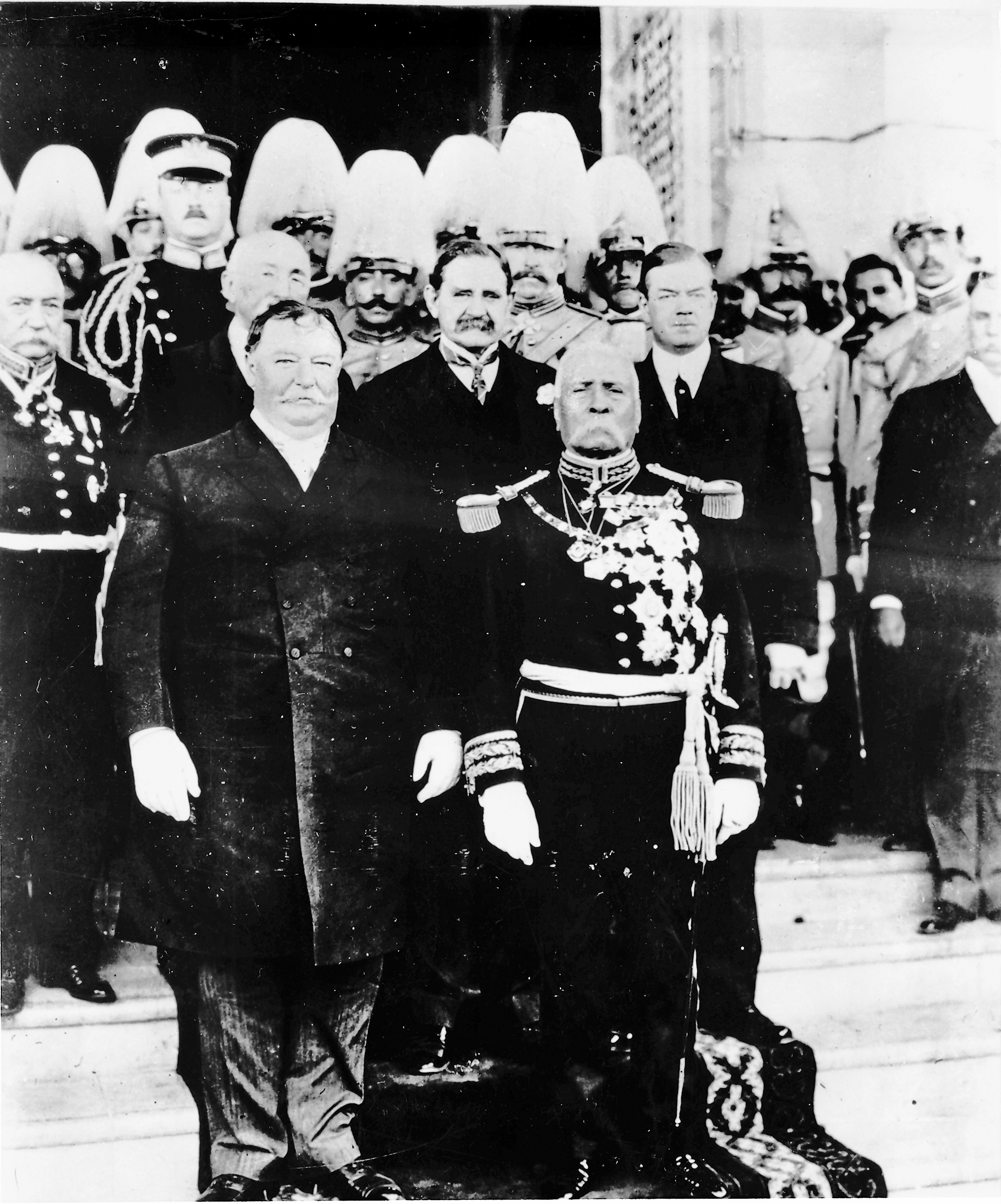
Taft and Porfirio Díaz, Ciudad Juárez, Mexico, 1909

When Taft entered office, Mexico was increasingly restless under the grip of longtime dictator Porfirio Díaz. Many Mexicans backed his opponent, Francisco Madero. There were a number of incidents in which Mexican rebels crossed the U.S. border to obtain horses and weapons; Taft sought to prevent this by ordering the U.S. Army to the border areas for maneuvers. Taft told his military aide, Archibald Butt, that "I am going to sit on the lid and it will take a great deal to pry me off". He showed his support for Díaz by meeting with him at El Paso, Texas, and Ciudad Juárez, Chihuahua, the first meeting between a U.S. and a Mexican president and also the first time an American president visited Mexico. The day of the summit, Frederick Russell Burnham and a Texas Ranger captured and disarmed an assassin holding a palm pistol only a few feet from the two presidents. Before the election in Mexico, Díaz jailed opposition candidate Francisco I. Madero, whose supporters took up arms. This resulted in both the ousting of Díaz and a revolution that would continue for another ten years. In the U.S.'s Arizona Territory, two citizens were killed and almost a dozen injured, some as a result of gunfire across the border. Taft was against an aggressive response and so instructed the territorial governor.

Nicaragua's president, José Santos Zelaya, wanted to revoke commercial concessions granted to American companies, (Note: In one of which Secretary Knox was said to be a major stockholder. See Coletta 1973, p. 188.) and American diplomats quietly favored rebel forces under Juan Estrada. Nicaragua was in debt to foreign powers, and the U.S. was unwilling to let an alternate canal route fall into the hands of Europeans. Zelaya's elected successor, José Madriz, could not put down the rebellion as U.S. forces interfered, and in August 1910, the Estrada forces took Managua, the capital. The U.S. compelled Nicaragua to accept a loan, and sent officials to ensure it was repaid from government revenues. The country remained unstable, and after another coup in 1911 and more disturbances in 1912, Taft sent troops to begin the United States occupation of Nicaragua, which lasted until 1933.

Treaties among Panama, Colombia, and the United States to resolve disputes arising from the Panamanian Revolution of 1903 had been signed by the lame-duck Roosevelt administration in early 1909, and were approved by the Senate and also ratified by Panama. Colombia, however, declined to ratify the treaties, and after the 1912 elections, Knox offered $10 million to the Colombians (later raised to $25 million). The Colombians felt the amount inadequate, and requested arbitration; the matter was not settled under the Taft administration.

==== East Asia ====
Due to his years in the Philippines, Taft was keenly interested as president in East Asian affairs. Taft considered relations with Europe relatively unimportant, but because of the potential for trade and investment, Taft ranked the post of minister to China as most important in the Foreign Service. Knox did not agree, and declined a suggestion that he go to Peking to view the facts on the ground. Taft considered Roosevelt's minister there, William W. Rockhill, as uninterested in the China trade, and replaced him with William J. Calhoun, whom McKinley and Roosevelt had sent on several foreign missions. Knox did not listen to Calhoun on policy, and there were often conflicts. Taft and Knox tried unsuccessfully to extend John Hay's Open Door Policy to Manchuria.

In 1898, an American company had gained a concession for a railroad between Hankow and Sichuan, but the Chinese revoked the agreement in 1904 after the company (which was indemnified for the revocation) breached the agreement by selling a majority stake outside the United States. The Chinese imperial government got the money for the indemnity from the British Hong Kong government, on condition British subjects would be favored if foreign capital was needed to build the railroad line, and in 1909, a British-led consortium began negotiations. This came to Knox's attention in May of that year, and he demanded that U.S. banks be allowed to participate. Taft appealed personally to the Prince Regent, Zaifeng, Prince Chun, and was successful in gaining U.S. participation, though agreements were not signed until May 1911. However, the Chinese decree authorizing the agreement also required the nationalization of local railroad companies in the affected provinces. Inadequate compensation was paid to the shareholders, and these grievances were among those which touched off the 1911 Revolution.

After the revolution broke out, the revolt's leaders chose Sun Yat-sen as provisional president of what became the Republic of China, overthrowing the Manchu dynasty, Taft was reluctant to recognize the new government, although American public opinion was in favor of it. The U.S. House of Representatives in February 1912 passed a resolution supporting a Chinese republic, but Taft and Knox felt recognition should come as a concerted action by Western powers. Taft in his final annual message to Congress in December 1912 indicated that he was moving toward recognition once the republic was fully established, but by then he had been defeated for reelection and he did not follow through. Taft continued the policy against immigration from China and Japan as under Roosevelt. A revised treaty of friendship and navigation entered into by the U.S. and Japan in 1911 granted broad reciprocal rights to Japanese people in America and Americans in Japan, but were premised on the continuation of the Gentlemen's Agreement. There was objection on the West Coast when the treaty was submitted to the Senate, but Taft informed politicians that there was no change in immigration policy.

==== Europe ====
Taft was opposed to the traditional practice of rewarding wealthy supporters with key ambassadorial posts, preferring that diplomats not live in a lavish lifestyle and selecting men who, as Taft put it, would recognize an American when they saw one. High on his list for dismissal was the ambassador to France, Henry White, whom Taft knew and disliked from his visits to Europe. White's ousting caused other career State Department employees to fear that their jobs might be lost to politics. Taft also wanted to replace the Roosevelt-appointed ambassador in London, Whitelaw Reid, but Reid, owner of the New-York Tribune, had backed Taft during the campaign, and both William and Nellie Taft enjoyed his gossipy reports. Reid remained in place until his 1912 death.

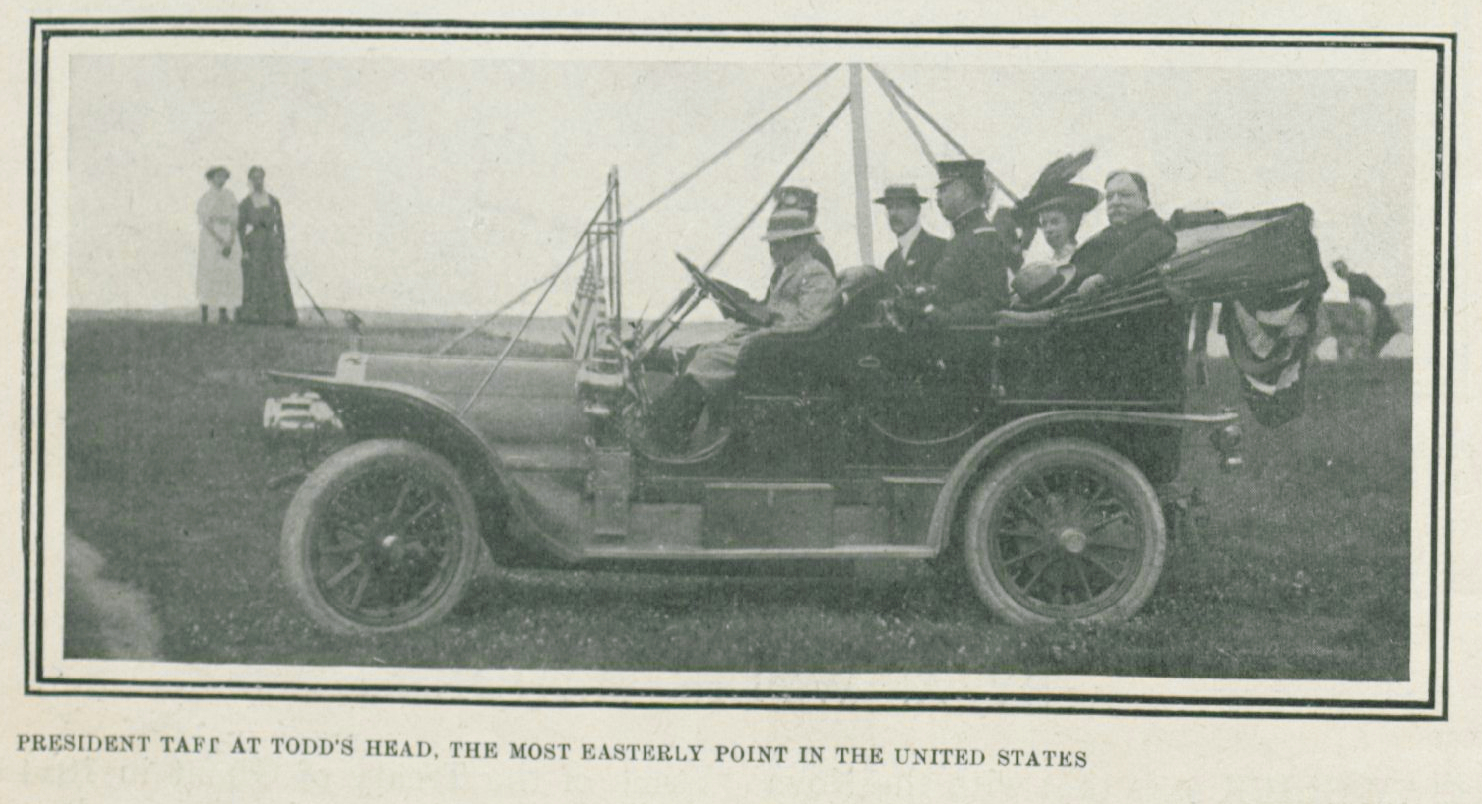
President Taft in a motorcar at Todd's Head, in Eastport, Maine overlooking Pope's Folly and Canada's Fundy Islands.

Taft was a supporter of settling international disputes by arbitration, and he negotiated treaties with Great Britain and with France providing that differences be arbitrated. These were signed in August 1911. Neither Taft nor Knox (a former senator) consulted with members of the Senate during the negotiating process. By then many Republicans were opposed to Taft and the president felt that lobbying too hard for the treaties might cause their defeat. He made some speeches supporting the treaties in October, but the Senate added amendments Taft could not accept, killing the agreements.

Although no general arbitration treaty was entered into, Taft's administration settled several disputes with Great Britain by peaceful means, often involving arbitration. These included a settlement of the boundary between Maine and New Brunswick, a long-running dispute over seal hunting in the Bering Sea that also involved Japan, and a similar disagreement regarding fishing off Newfoundland. The sealing convention remained in force until abrogated by Japan in 1940.

=== Domestic policies and politics ===
==== Antitrust ====
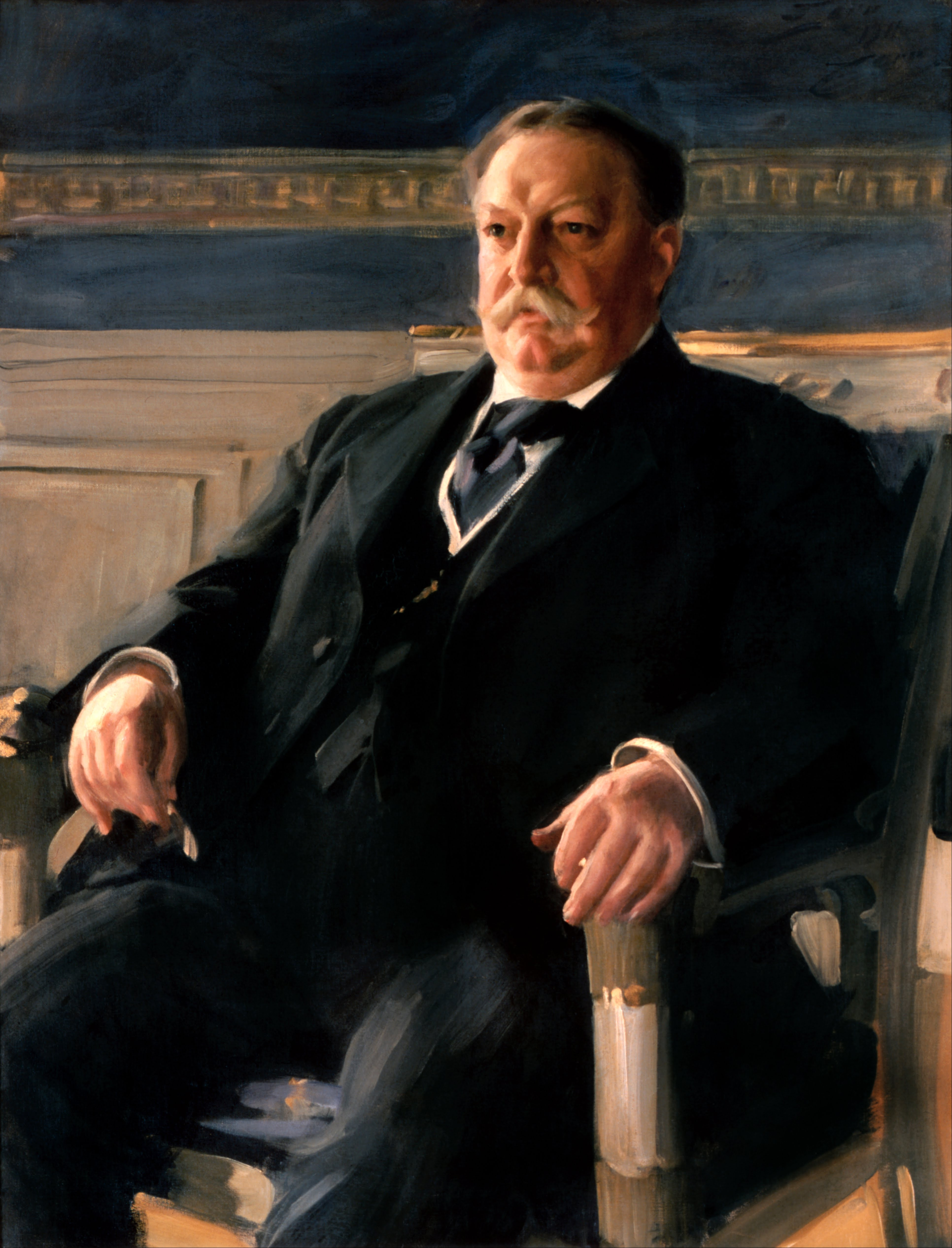
Official White House portrait of Taft by Anders Zorn, c. 1911

Taft continued and expanded Roosevelt's efforts to break up business combinations through lawsuits brought under the Sherman Antitrust Act, bringing 70 cases in four years (Roosevelt had brought 40 in seven years). Suits brought against the Standard Oil Company and the American Tobacco Company, initiated under Roosevelt, were decided in favor of the government by the Supreme Court in 1911. In June 1911, the Democrat-controlled House of Representatives began hearings into United States Steel (U.S. Steel). That company had been expanded under Roosevelt, who had supported its acquisition of the Tennessee Coal, Iron, and Railroad Company as a means of preventing the deepening of the Panic of 1907, a decision the former president defended when testifying at the hearings. Taft, as Secretary of War, had praised the acquisitions. Historian Louis L. Gould suggested that Roosevelt was likely deceived into believing that U.S. Steel did not want to purchase the Tennessee company, but it was in fact a bargain. For Roosevelt, questioning the matter went to his personal honesty.

In October 1911, Taft's Justice Department brought suit against U.S. Steel, demanding that over a hundred of its subsidiaries be granted corporate independence, and naming as defendants many prominent business executives and financiers. The pleadings in the case had not been reviewed by Taft, and alleged that Roosevelt "had fostered monopoly, and had been duped by clever industrialists". Roosevelt was offended by the references to him and his administration in the pleadings, and felt that Taft could not evade command responsibility by saying he did not know of them.

Taft sent a special message to Congress on the need for a revamped antitrust statute when it convened its regular session in December 1911, but it took no action. Another antitrust case that had political repercussions for Taft was that brought against the International Harvester Company, the large manufacturer of farm equipment, in early 1912. As Roosevelt's administration had investigated International Harvester, but had taken no action (a decision Taft had supported), the suit became caught up in Roosevelt's challenge for the Republican presidential nomination. Supporters of Taft alleged that Roosevelt had acted improperly; the former president blasted Taft for waiting three and a half years, and until he was under challenge, to reverse a decision he had supported.

==== Ballinger–Pinchot affair ====
Roosevelt was an ardent conservationist, assisted in this by like-minded appointees, including Interior Secretary James R. Garfield (Note: Son of the late president) and Chief Forester Gifford Pinchot. Taft agreed with the need for conservation, but felt it should be accomplished by legislation rather than executive order. He did not retain Garfield, an Ohioan, as secretary, choosing instead a westerner, former Seattle mayor Richard A. Ballinger. Roosevelt was surprised at the replacement, believing that Taft had promised to keep Garfield, and this change was one of the events that caused Roosevelt to realize that Taft would choose different policies.

Roosevelt had withdrawn much land from the public domain, including some in Alaska thought rich in coal. In 1902, Clarence Cunningham, an Idaho entrepreneur, had found coal deposits in Alaska, and made mining claims, and the government investigated their legality. This dragged on for the remainder of the Roosevelt administration, including during the year (1907–1908) when Ballinger served as head of the United States General Land Office. A special agent for the Land Office, Louis Glavis, investigated the Cunningham claims, and when Secretary Ballinger in 1909 approved them, Glavis broke governmental protocol by going outside the Interior Department to seek help from Pinchot.

In September 1909, Glavis made his allegations public in a magazine article, disclosing that Ballinger had acted as an attorney for Cunningham between his two periods of government service. This violated conflict of interest rules forbidding a former government official from advocacy on a matter he had been responsible for. On September 13, 1909, Taft dismissed Glavis from government service, relying on a report from Attorney General George W. Wickersham dated two days previously. Pinchot was determined to dramatize the issue by forcing his own dismissal, which Taft tried to avoid, fearing that it might cause a break with Roosevelt (still overseas). Taft asked Elihu Root (by then a senator) to look into the matter, and Root urged the firing of Pinchot.

Taft had ordered government officials not to comment on the fracas. In January 1910, Pinchot forced the issue by sending a letter to Iowa senator Dolliver alleging that but for the actions of the Forestry Service, Taft would have approved a fraudulent claim on public lands. According to Pringle, this "was an utterly improper appeal from an executive subordinate to the legislative branch of the government and an unhappy president prepared to separate Pinchot from public office". Pinchot was dismissed, much to his delight, and he sailed for Europe to lay his case before Roosevelt. A congressional investigation followed, which cleared Ballinger by majority vote, but the administration was embarrassed when Glavis' attorney, Louis D. Brandeis, proved that the Wickersham report had been backdated, which Taft belatedly admitted. The Ballinger–Pinchot affair caused progressives and Roosevelt loyalists to feel that Taft had turned his back on Roosevelt's agenda.

==== Civil rights ====
Taft announced in his inaugural address that he would not appoint African Americans to federal jobs, such as postmaster, where this would cause racial friction. This differed from Roosevelt, who would not remove or replace black officeholders with whom local whites would not deal. Termed Taft's "Southern Policy", this stance effectively invited white protests against black appointees. Taft followed through, removing most black office holders in the South, and made few appointments of African Americans in the North.

At the time Taft was inaugurated, the way forward for African Americans was debated by their leaders. Booker T. Washington proposed in his Atlanta Compromise that most blacks be trained for industrial work, with only a few seeking higher education; W. E. B. DuBois took a more militant stand for equality. Taft tended toward Washington's approach. According to Coletta, Taft let the African-American "be 'kept in his place' ... He thus failed to see or follow the humanitarian mission historically associated with the Republican party, with the result that Negroes both North and South began to drift toward the Democratic party."

Taft, a Unitarian, was a leader in the early 20th century of the favorable reappraisal of Catholicism's historic role. It tended to neutralize anti-Catholic sentiments, especially in the Far West where Protestantism was a weak force. In 1904 Taft gave a speech at the University of Notre Dame. He praised the "enterprise, courage, and fidelity to duty that distinguished those heroes of Spain who braved the then frightful dangers of the deep to carry Christianity and European civilization into" the Philippines. In 1909 he praised Junípero Serra as an "apostle, legislator, [and] builder" who advanced "the beginning of civilization in California."

A supporter of free immigration, Taft vetoed a bill passed by Congress and supported by labor unions that would have restricted unskilled laborers by imposing a literacy test.

=== Judicial appointments ===
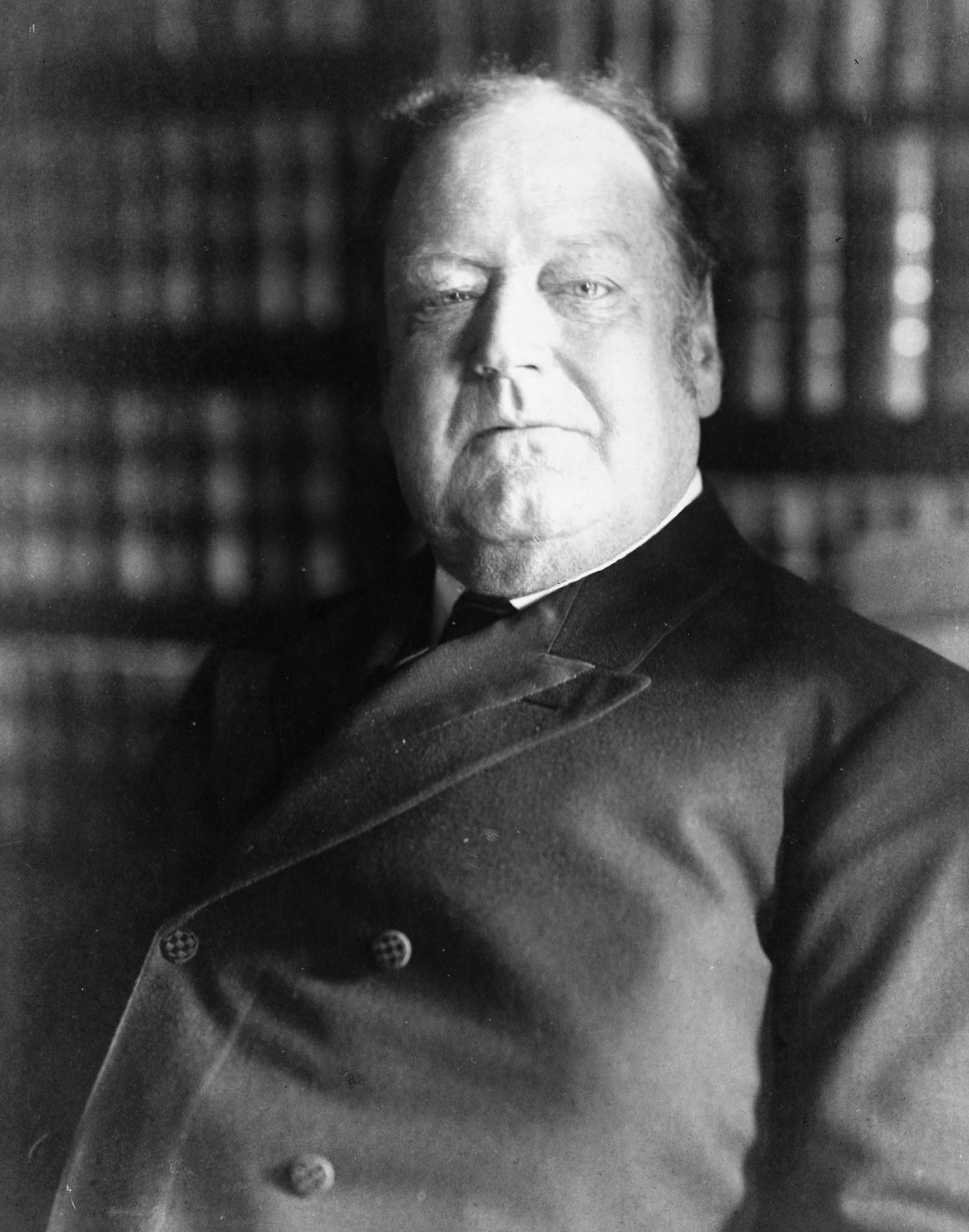
Taft promoted Associate Justice Edward Douglass White to be Chief Justice of the United States.

Taft made six appointments to the Supreme Court; only George Washington and Franklin D. Roosevelt made more. The death of Justice Rufus W. Peckham in October 1909 gave Taft his first opportunity. He chose an old friend and colleague from the Sixth Circuit, Horace H. Lurton of Georgia; he had in vain urged Theodore Roosevelt to appoint Lurton to the high court. Attorney General Wickersham objected that Lurton, a former Confederate soldier and a Democrat, was aged 65. Taft named Lurton anyway on December 13, 1909, and the Senate confirmed him by voice vote a week later. Lurton is still the oldest person to be made an associate justice. (Note: Hughes was 67 when he began his second period on the court, as chief justice succeeding Taft.) Lurie suggested that Taft, already beset by the tariff and conservation controversies, desired to perform an official act which gave him pleasure, especially since he thought Lurton deserved it.

Justice David Josiah Brewer's death on March 28, 1910, gave Taft a second opportunity to fill a seat on the high court; he chose New York Governor Charles Evans Hughes. Taft told Hughes that should the chief justiceship fall vacant during his term, Hughes would be his likely choice for the center seat. The Senate quickly confirmed Hughes, but then Chief Justice Fuller died on July 4, 1910. Taft took five months to replace Fuller, and when he did, it was with Justice Edward Douglass White, who became the first associate justice to be promoted to chief justice. (Note: The others being Harlan Fiske Stone and William Rehnquist.) According to Lurie, Taft, who still had hopes of being chief justice, may have been more willing to appoint an older man than he (White) than a younger one (Hughes), who might outlive him, as indeed Hughes did. To fill White's seat as associate justice, Taft appointed Willis Van Devanter of Wyoming, a federal appeals judge. By the time Taft nominated White and Van Devanter in December 1910, he had another seat to fill due to William Henry Moody's retirement because of illness; he named a Louisiana Democrat, Joseph R. Lamar, whom he had met while playing golf, and had subsequently learned had a good reputation as a judge.

With the death of Justice Harlan in October 1911, Taft got to fill a sixth seat on the Supreme Court. After Secretary Knox declined appointment, Taft named Chancellor of New Jersey Mahlon Pitney. Pitney had a stronger anti-labor record than Taft's other appointments, and was the only one to meet opposition, winning confirmation by a Senate vote of 50–26.

Taft appointed 13 judges to the federal courts of appeal and 38 to the United States district courts. He also appointed judges to various specialized courts, including the first five appointees each to the United States Commerce Court and the United States Court of Customs Appeals. The Commerce Court, created in 1910, stemmed from a Taft proposal for a specialized court to hear appeals from the Interstate Commerce Commission. There was considerable opposition to its establishment, which only grew when one of its judges, Robert W. Archbald, was in 1912 impeached for corruption and removed by the Senate the following January. Taft vetoed a bill to abolish the court, but the respite was short-lived as Woodrow Wilson signed similar legislation in October 1913.

=== 1912 presidential campaign and election ===
==== Moving apart from Roosevelt ====
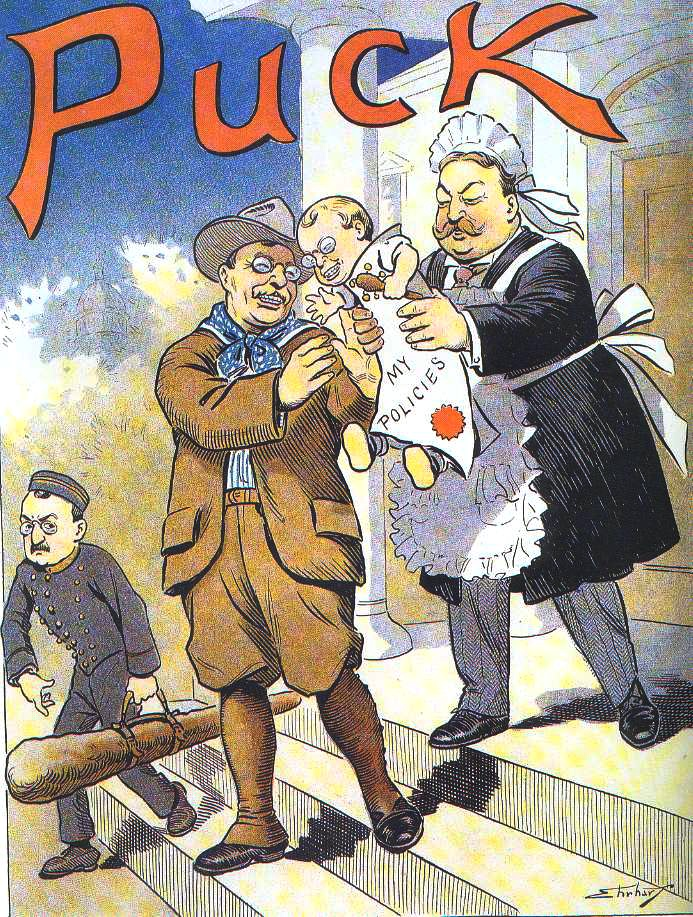
1909 Puck magazine cover: Roosevelt departs, entrusting his policies to Taft.

During Roosevelt's fifteen months beyond the Atlantic, from March 1909 to June 1910, neither man wrote much to the other. Taft biographer Lurie suggested that each expected the other to make the first move to re-establish their relationship on a new footing. Upon Roosevelt's triumphant return, Taft invited him to stay at the White House. The former president declined, and in private letters to friends expressed dissatisfaction at Taft's performance. Taft and Roosevelt met twice in 1910; the meetings, though outwardly cordial, did not display their former closeness. Nevertheless, he wrote that he expected Taft to be renominated by the Republicans in 1912, and did not speak of himself as a candidate.

Roosevelt gave a series of speeches in the West in the late summer and early fall of 1910 in which he severely criticized the nation's judiciary. He not only attacked the Supreme Court's 1905 decision Lochner v. New York, he accused the federal courts of undermining democracy, branding the suspect jurists "fossilized judges", and comparing their tendency to strike down progressive reform legislation to Justice Roger Taney's ruling in Dred Scott v. Sandford (1857). To ensure that the constitution served the public interest, Roosevelt joined other progressives, including the Democrat William Jennings Bryan, in calling for "judicial recall", which would theoretically enable popular majorities to remove judges from office by referendum and, in some cases, reverse unpopular judicial decisions. This attack horrified Taft, who, though he privately agreed that Lochner and other decisions had been poorly decided, adamantly believed in the importance of judicial authority to constitutional government. His personal horror was shared by other prominent members of the nation's elite legal community, like Elihu Root and Alton B. Parker, and solidified in Taft's mind that Roosevelt must not be permitted to regain the presidency, whatever the cost.

In addition to the judicial issue, Roosevelt called for "elimination of corporate expenditures for political purposes, physical valuation of railroad properties, regulation of industrial combinations, establishment of an export tariff commission, a graduated income tax", and "workmen's compensation laws, state and national legislation to regulate the [labor] of women and children, and complete publicity of campaign expenditure". According to John Murphy, "As Roosevelt began to move to the left, Taft veered to the right."

During the 1910 midterm election campaign, Roosevelt involved himself in New York politics. With donations and influence, Taft meanwhile tried to secure the election of Ohio's Republican gubernatorial nominee, former lieutenant governor Warren G. Harding. The Republicans suffered losses in the 1910 elections as the Democrats took control of the House and slashed the Republican majority in the Senate. In New Jersey, Democrat Woodrow Wilson was elected governor, and Harding lost in Ohio.

After the election, Roosevelt continued to promote progressive ideals, a New Nationalism, much to Taft's dismay. Roosevelt attacked his successor's administration, arguing that its guiding principles were not those of the party of Lincoln, but those of the Gilded Age. The feud continued on and off through 1911, a year in which there were few elections of significance. Senator Robert La Follette announced a presidential run as a Republican, and was backed by a convention of progressives. Roosevelt began to move into a position for a run in late 1911, writing that the tradition that presidents not run for a third term applied only to consecutive terms.

Roosevelt received many letters from supporters urging him to run, and Republican office-holders were organizing on his behalf. Thwarted on many policies by an unwilling Congress and courts in his full term in the White House, he saw manifestations of public support he believed would sweep him to the White House with a mandate for progressive policies that would brook no opposition. In February, Roosevelt announced he would accept the Republican nomination if it was offered to him. Taft felt that if he lost in November, it would be a repudiation of the party, but if he lost renomination, it would be a rejection of himself. He was reluctant to oppose Roosevelt, who helped make him president, but having become president, he was determined to be president, and that meant not standing aside to allow Roosevelt to gain another term.

==== Primaries and convention ====
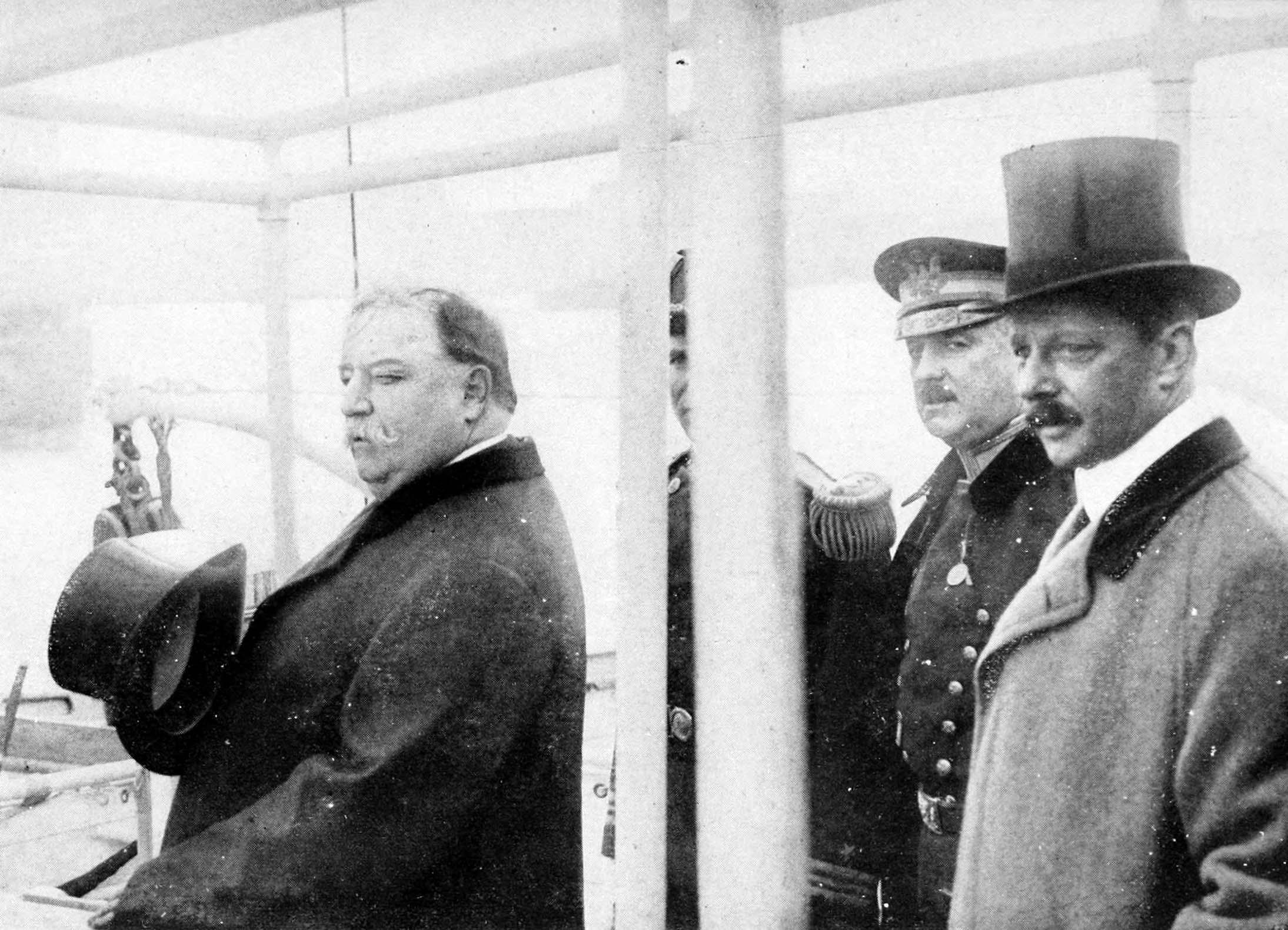
Taft with Archibald Butt (second from right)

As Roosevelt became more radical in his progressivism, Taft was hardened in his resolve to achieve re-nomination, as he was convinced that the progressives threatened the very foundation of the government. One blow to Taft was the loss of Archibald Butt, one of the last links between the previous and present presidents, as Butt had formerly served Roosevelt. Ambivalent between his loyalties, Butt went to Europe on vacation; he died in the sinking of the RMS Titanic.

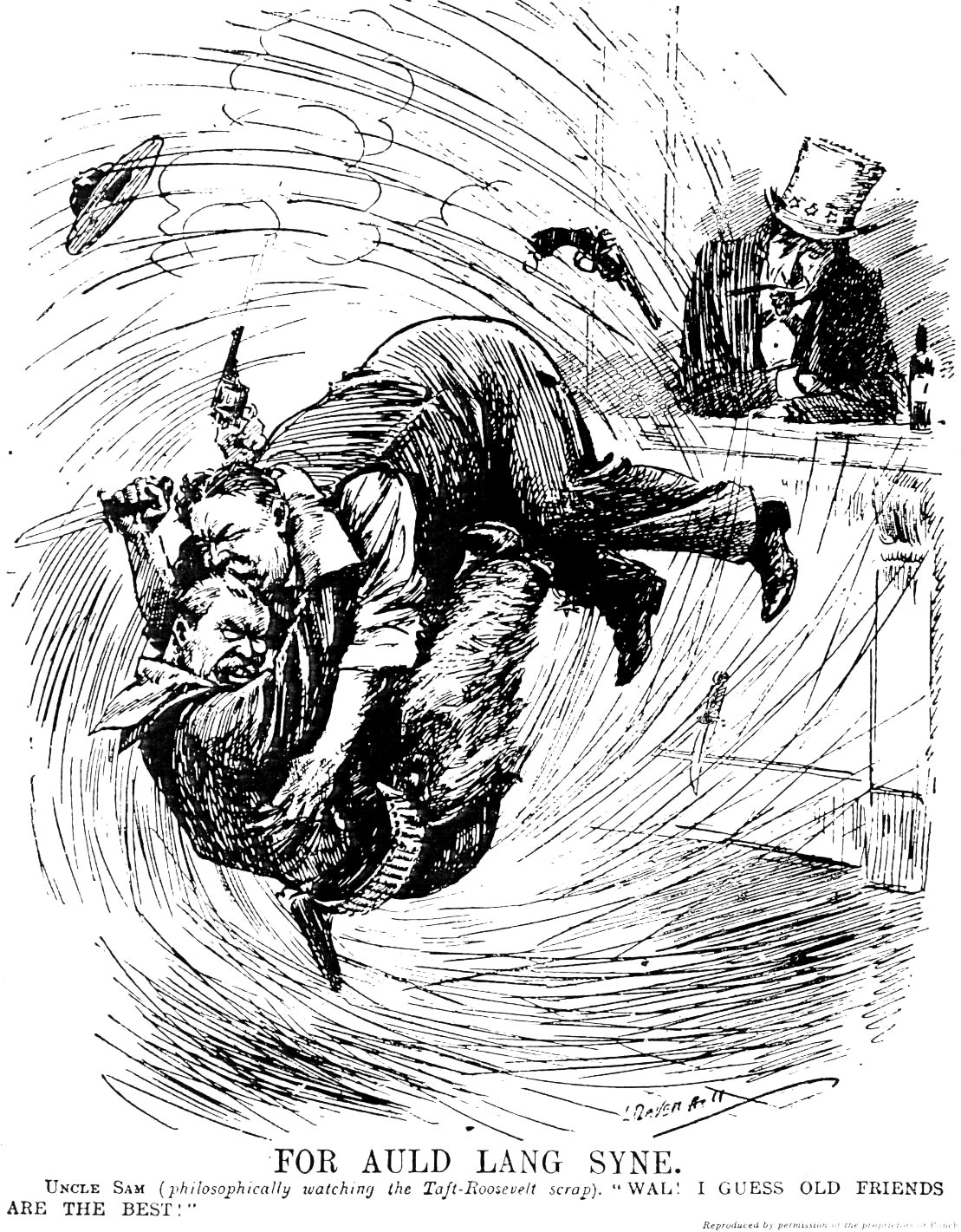
Taft and Roosevelt – political enemies in 1912

Roosevelt dominated the primaries, winning 278 of the 362 delegates to the Republican National Convention in Chicago decided in that manner. Taft had control of the party machinery, and it came as no surprise that he gained the bulk of the delegates decided at district or state conventions. Taft did not have a majority, but was likely to have one once southern delegations committed to him. Roosevelt challenged the election of these delegates, but the RNC overruled most objections. Roosevelt's sole remaining chance was with a friendly convention chairman, who might make rulings on the seating of delegates that favored his side. Taft followed custom and remained in Washington, but Roosevelt went to Chicago to run his campaign and told his supporters in a speech, "we stand at Armageddon, and we battle for the Lord".

Taft had won over Root, who agreed to run for temporary chairman of the convention, and the delegates elected Root over Roosevelt's candidate. The Roosevelt forces moved to substitute the delegates they supported for the ones they argued should not be seated. Root made a crucial ruling, that although the contested delegates could not vote on their own seating, they could vote on the other contested delegates, a ruling that assured Taft's nomination, as the motion offered by the Roosevelt forces failed, 567–507. As it became clear Roosevelt would bolt the party if not nominated, some Republicans sought a compromise candidate to avert electoral disaster; they failed. Taft's name was placed in nomination by Warren G. Harding, whose attempts to praise Taft and unify the party were met with angry interruptions from progressives. Taft was nominated on the first ballot, though most Roosevelt delegates refused to vote.

==== Campaign and defeat ====
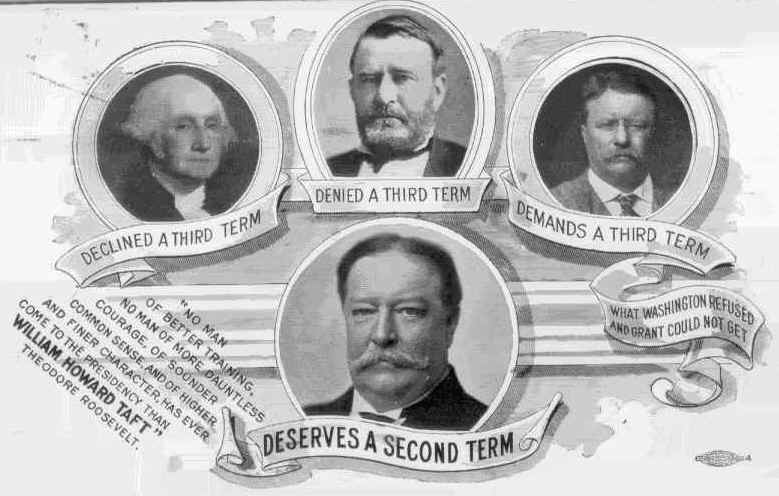
Campaign advertisement arguing Taft deserved a second term

Alleging Taft had stolen the nomination, Roosevelt and his followers formed the Progressive Party. (Note: The "Bull Moose Party", named by Roosevelt's comment he felt as strong as a young bull moose) Taft knew he would lose, but concluded that through Roosevelt's loss at Chicago the party had been preserved as "the defender of conservative government and conservative institutions." He made his doomed run to preserve conservative control of the Republican Party. Governor Woodrow Wilson was the Democratic nominee. Seeing Roosevelt as the greater electoral threat, Wilson spent little time attacking Taft, arguing that Roosevelt had been lukewarm in opposing the trusts during his presidency, and that Wilson was the true reformer. A progressive conservative, Taft contrasted what he called his "progressive conservatism" with Roosevelt's Progressive democracy, which to Taft represented "the establishment of a benevolent despotism."

Of the differences between Taft and Roosevelt, one journal wrote that

President Taft has made mistakes, but he has been a sincere and highminded executive. The question, then, is whether the majority of the Republican voters have gone far beyond his position, have become dissatisfied with "conservative progressive" policies and now want for their leader and candidate a more radical progressive, a bolder and a more aggressive reformer. Mr. Roosevelt stands for most of the measures or proposals forming the Taft platform, plus several others. If the majority of the Republican voters has assimilated the newer Roosevelt polices and want more radicalism in their party policies and methods, Mr. Roosevelt is their logical candidate.

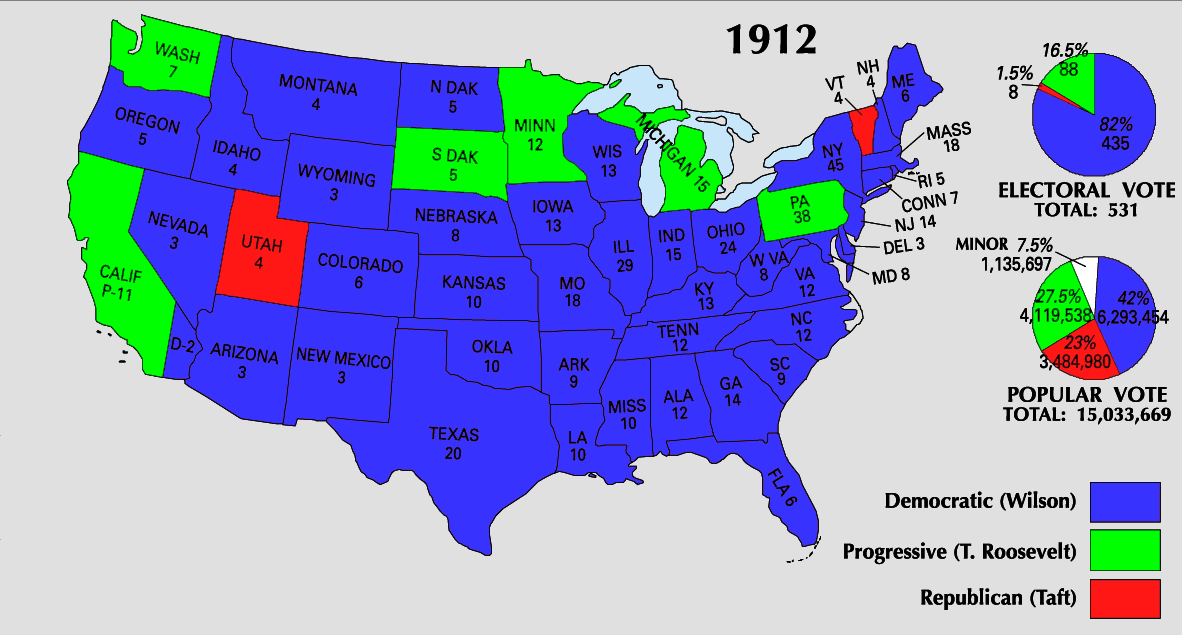
Electoral vote by state, 1912. States won by Taft are in red.

Reverting to the pre-1888 custom that presidents seeking reelection did not campaign, Taft spoke publicly only once, making his nomination acceptance speech on August 1. He had difficulty in financing the campaign, as many industrialists had concluded he could not win, and would support Wilson to block Roosevelt. The president issued a confident statement in September after the Republicans narrowly won Vermont's state elections in a three-way fight, but had no illusions he would win his race. He had hoped to send his cabinet officers out on the campaign trail, but found them reluctant to go. Senator Root agreed to give a single speech for him.

Vice President Sherman had been renominated at Chicago; seriously ill during the campaign, he died six days before the election, (Note: Sherman was the last American vice president to die in office.) and was replaced on the ticket by the president of Columbia University, Nicholas Murray Butler. But few electors chose Taft and Butler, who won only Utah and Vermont, for a total of eight electoral votes. (Note: Taft's eight electoral votes set a record for futility by a Republican candidate matched by Alf Landon in 1936.) Roosevelt won 88, and Wilson 435. Wilson won with a plurality—not a majority—of the popular vote. Taft finished with just under 3.5 million, over 600,000 less than the former president. Taft was not on the ballot in California, due to the actions of local Progressives, nor in South Dakota.

== Return to Yale (1913–1921) ==
With no pension or other compensation to expect from the government after leaving the White House, Taft contemplated a return to the practice of law, from which he had long been absent. Given that Taft had appointed many federal judges, including a majority of the Supreme Court, this would raise questions of conflict of interest at every federal court appearance. He was saved from this by Yale Law School's offer to appoint him Kent Professor of Law and Legal History. He accepted, and after a month's vacation in Georgia, arrived in New Haven on April 1, 1913, to a rapturous reception. As it was too late in the semester for him to give an academic course, he instead prepared eight lectures on "Questions of Modern Government", which he delivered in May. In June, he was initiated as an honorary member of the campus chapter of the Acacia fraternity. He earned money with paid speeches and with articles for magazines, and would end his eight years out of office having increased his savings. While at Yale, he wrote the treatise, Our Chief Magistrate and His Powers (1916).

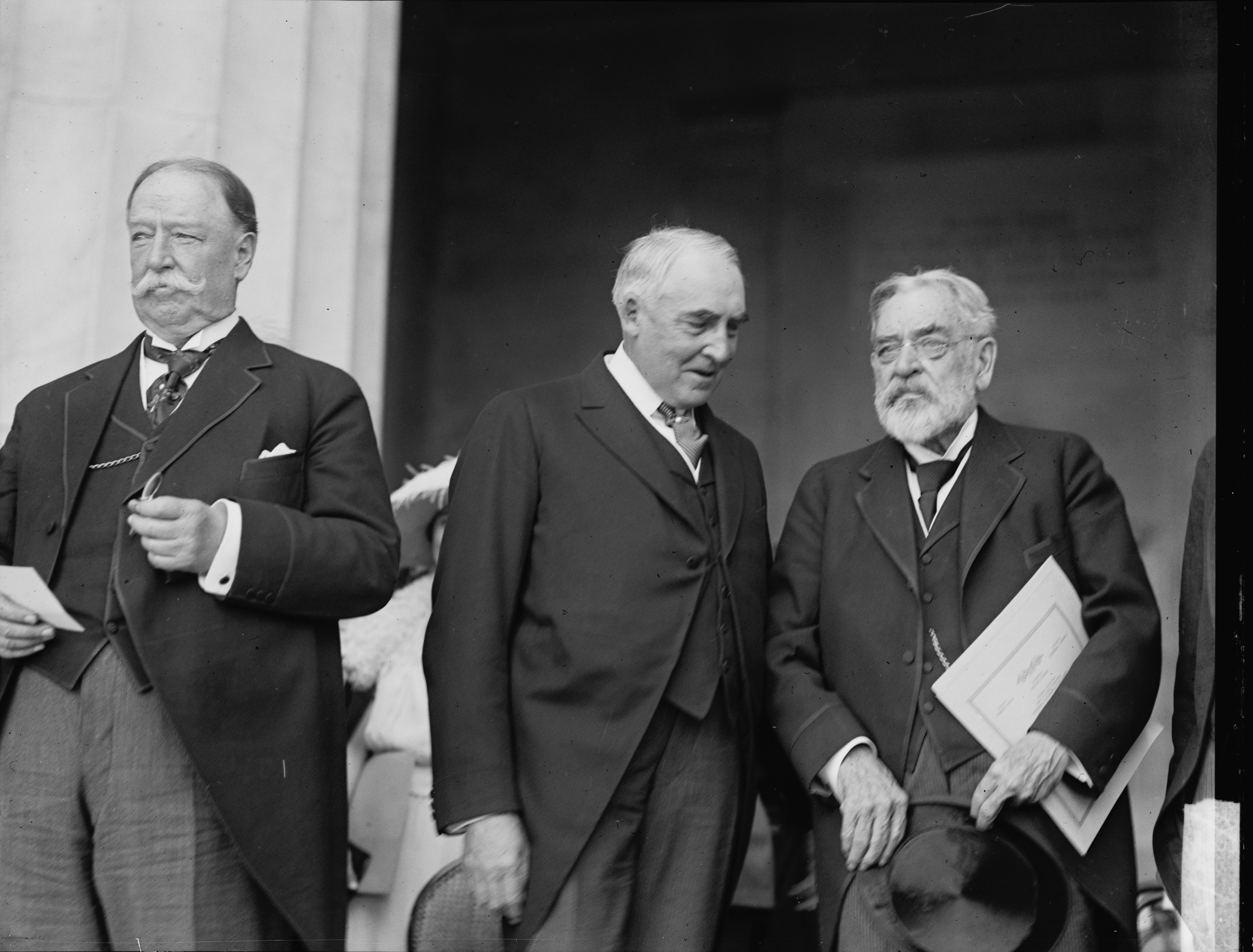
Taft (left) with President Warren G. Harding and Robert Lincoln at the dedication of the Lincoln Memorial, May 30, 1922

Taft had been made president of the Lincoln Memorial Commission while still in office; when Democrats proposed removing him for one of their party, he quipped that unlike losing the presidency, such a removal would hurt. The architect, Henry Bacon, wanted to use Colorado-Yule marble, while southern Democrats urged using Georgia marble. Taft lobbied for the western stone, and the matter was submitted to the Commission of Fine Arts, which supported Taft and Bacon. The project went forward; Taft would dedicate the Lincoln Memorial as chief justice in 1922. In 1913, Taft was elected to a one-year term as president of the American Bar Association (ABA), a trade group of lawyers. He removed opponents, such as Louis Brandeis and University of Pennsylvania Law School dean William Draper Lewis (a supporter of the Progressive Party) from committees. At a 1913 ABA meeting in Montreal, Taft delivered remarks that harshly criticized direct election as a method of judicial selection in U.S. states (regardless of whether elections were partisan), and urged states holding such elections to return to appointive systems for judicial selection.

Taft maintained a cordial relationship with Wilson. He privately criticized his successor on a number of issues, but made his views known publicly only on Philippine policy. Taft was appalled when, after Justice Lamar's death in January 1916, Wilson nominated Brandeis, whom Taft had never forgiven for his role in the Ballinger–Pinchot affair. Within days of Brandeis's nomination, Taft began organizing opposition to it among the leadership of the American Bar Association. During Brandeis's near-unprecedented confirmation hearings, Taft and six other past ABA presidents sent the Senate Judiciary Committee a joint letter declaring strong opposition to the nomination, citing Brandeis's "reputation, character and professional career". Taft called the nomination "an evil disgrace". Brandeis was confirmed. After joining the Court, Taft came to respect and like Brandeis as a colleague.

Taft and Roosevelt remained embittered; they met only once in the first three years of the Wilson presidency, at a funeral at Yale. They spoke only for a moment, politely but formally.

As president of the League to Enforce Peace, Taft hoped to prevent war through an international association of nations. With World War I raging in Europe, Taft sent Wilson a note of support for his foreign policy in 1915. President Wilson accepted Taft's invitation to address the league, and spoke in May 1916 of a postwar international organization that could prevent a repetition. Taft supported the effort to get Justice Hughes to resign from the bench and accept the Republican presidential nomination. Once this was done, Hughes tried to get Roosevelt and Taft to reconcile, as a united effort was needed to defeat Wilson. This occurred on October 3 in New York, but Roosevelt allowed only a handshake, and no words were exchanged. This was one of many difficulties for the Republicans in the campaign, and Wilson narrowly won reelection.

In March 1917, Taft demonstrated public support for the war effort by joining the Connecticut State Guard, a state defense force organized to carry out the state duties of the Connecticut National Guard while the National Guard served on active duty. When Wilson asked Congress to declare war on Germany in April 1917, Taft was an enthusiastic supporter; he was chairman of the American Red Cross' executive committee, which occupied much of the former president's time. In August 1917, Wilson conferred military titles on executives of the Red Cross as a way to provide them with additional authority to use in carrying out their wartime responsibilities, and Taft was appointed a major general.

During the war, Taft took leave from Yale in order to serve as co-chairman of the National War Labor Board, tasked with assuring good relations between industry owners and their workers. In February 1918, the new RNC chairman, Will H. Hays, approached Taft seeking his reconciliation with Roosevelt. While at the Palmer House in Chicago, Taft heard that Roosevelt was there having dinner, and after he walked in, the two men embraced to the applause of the room, but the relationship did not progress; Roosevelt died in January 1919. Taft later wrote, "Had he died in a hostile state of mind toward me, I would have mourned the fact all my life. I loved him always and cherish his memory."

When Wilson proposed establishment of a League of Nations, Taft expressed public support. He was the leader of his party's activist wing, and was opposed by a small group of senators who vigorously opposed the League. Taft's flip-flop on whether reservations to the Versailles Treaty were necessary angered both sides, causing some Republicans to call him a Wilson supporter and a traitor to his party. The Senate refused to ratify the Versailles pact.

== Chief Justice (1921–1930) ==
=== Appointment ===
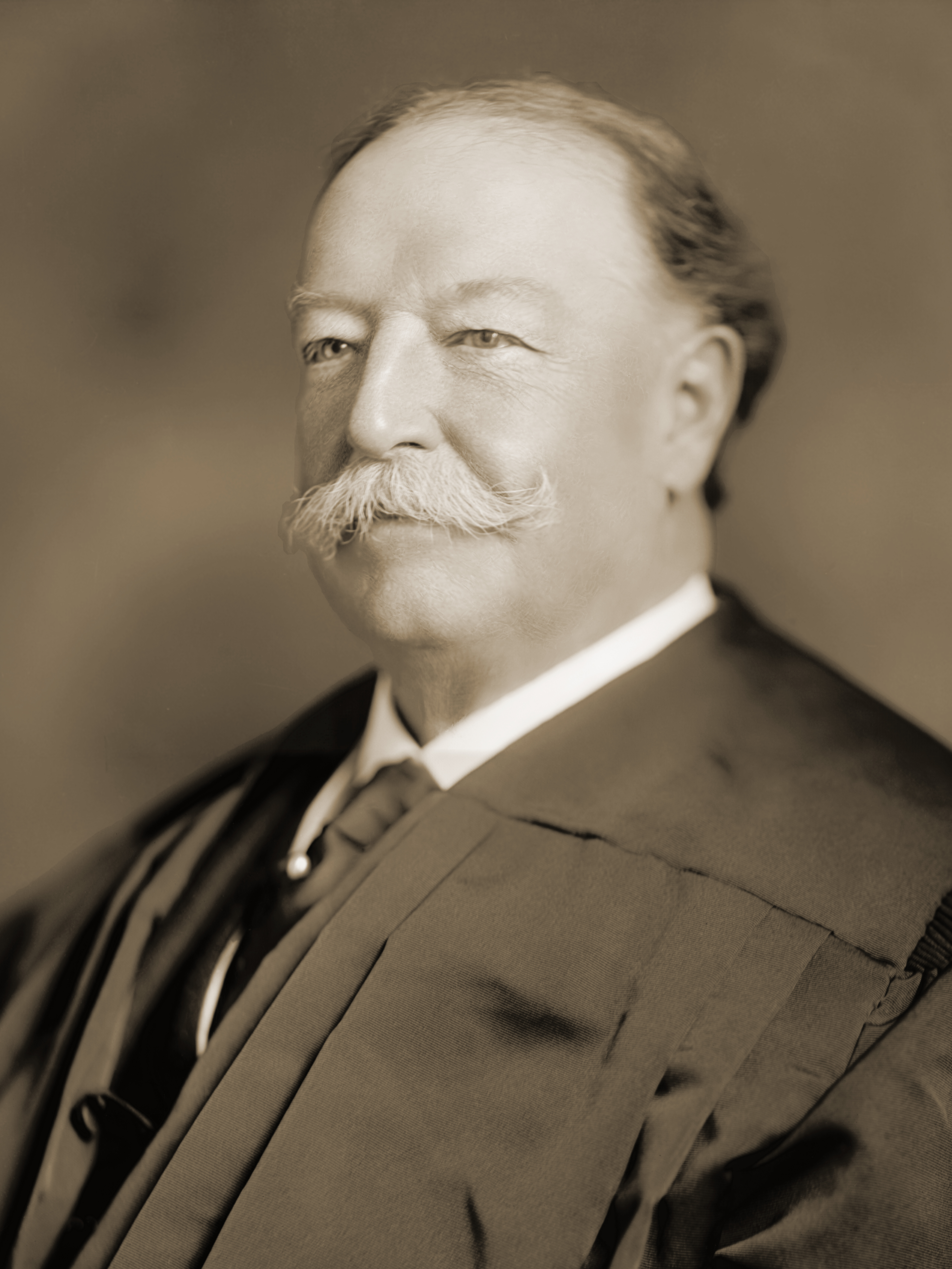
Chief Justice Taft, c. 1921

During the 1920 election campaign, Taft supported the Republican ticket—Harding (by then a senator) and Massachusetts Governor Calvin Coolidge; they were elected. Taft was among those asked to come to the president-elect's home in Marion, Ohio, to advise him on appointments, and the two men conferred there on December 24, 1920. By Taft's later account, after some conversation, Harding casually asked if Taft would accept appointment to the Supreme Court; if Taft would, Harding would appoint him. Taft had a condition for Harding—having served as president, and having appointed two of the present associate justices and opposed Brandeis, he could accept only the chief justice position. Harding made no response, and Taft in a thank-you note reiterated the condition and stated that Chief Justice White had often told him he was keeping the position for Taft until a Republican held the White House. In January 1921, Taft heard through intermediaries that Harding planned to appoint him, if given the chance.

White by then was in failing health, but made no move to resign when Harding was sworn in on March 4, 1921. Taft called on the chief justice on March 26, and found White ill, but still carrying on his work and not talking of retiring. White did not retire, dying in office on May 19, 1921. Taft issued a tribute to the man he had appointed to the center seat and waited and worried if he would be White's successor. Despite widespread speculation that Taft would be the pick, Harding made no quick announcement. Taft was lobbying for himself behind the scenes, especially with the Ohio politicians who formed Harding's inner circle.

It later emerged that Harding had also promised former Utah senator George Sutherland a seat on the Supreme Court and was waiting in the expectation that another place would become vacant. (Note: Sutherland was appointed to the high court in 1922.) Harding was also considering a proposal by Justice William R. Day to crown his career by being chief justice for six months before retiring. Taft felt, when he learned of this plan, that a short-term appointment would not serve the office well, and that once confirmed by the Senate, the memory of Day would grow dim. After Harding rejected Day's plan, Attorney General Harry Daugherty, who supported Taft's candidacy, urged him to fill the vacancy, and he named Taft on June 30, 1921. The Senate confirmed Taft the same day, 61–4, without any committee hearings and after a brief debate in executive session. Taft drew the objections of three progressive Republicans and one southern Democrat. (Note: The Republicans were Hiram Johnson of California, William E. Borah of Idaho and La Follette of Wisconsin. The Democrat was Thomas E. Watson of Georgia.) When he was sworn in on July 11, he became the first and to date only person to serve both as president and chief justice.

=== Jurisprudence ===
==== Commerce Clause ====
The Supreme Court under Taft compiled a conservative record in Commerce Clause jurisprudence. This had the practical effect of making it difficult for the federal government to regulate industry, and the Taft Court also scuttled many state laws. The few liberals on the court—Brandeis, Holmes, and (from 1925) Harlan Fiske Stone—sometimes protested, believing orderly progress essential, but often joined in the majority opinion.

The White Court had, in 1918, struck down an attempt by Congress to regulate child labor in Hammer v. Dagenhart. (Note: 247 U.S. 251 (1918)) Congress thereafter attempted to end child labor by imposing a tax on certain corporations making use of it. That law was overturned by the Supreme Court in 1922 in Bailey v. Drexel Furniture Co., with Taft writing the court's opinion for an 8–1 majority. (Note: 259 U.S. 20 (1922). Justice John H. Clarke dissented without opinion.) He held that the tax was not intended to raise revenue, but rather was an attempt to regulate matters reserved to the states under the Tenth Amendment, and that allowing such taxation would eliminate the power of the states. One case in which Taft and his court upheld federal regulation was Stafford v. Wallace. Taft ruled for a 7–1 majority (Note: 258 U.S. 495 (1922) Justice Day did not participate and Justice James C. McReynolds dissented without opinion.) that the processing of animals in stockyards was so closely tied to interstate commerce as to bring it within the ambit of Congress's power to regulate.

A case in which the Taft Court struck down regulation that generated a dissent from the chief justice was Adkins v. Children's Hospital. (Note: 261 U.S. 525 (1923)) Congress had decreed a minimum wage for women in the District of Columbia. A 5–3 majority of the Supreme Court struck it down. Justice Sutherland wrote for the majority that the recently ratified Nineteenth Amendment, guaranteeing women the vote, meant that the sexes were equal when it came to bargaining power over working conditions; Taft, in dissent, deemed this unrealistic. Taft's dissent in Adkins was rare both because he authored few dissents, and because it was one of the few times he took an expansive view of the police power of the government.

==== Powers of government ====
In 1922, Taft ruled for a unanimous court in Balzac v. Porto Rico. (Note: 258 U.S. 298 (1922)) One of the Insular Cases, Balzac involved a Puerto Rico newspaper publisher who was prosecuted for libel but denied a jury trial, a Sixth Amendment protection under the constitution. Taft held that as Puerto Rico was not a territory designated for statehood, only such constitutional protections as Congress decreed would apply to its residents.

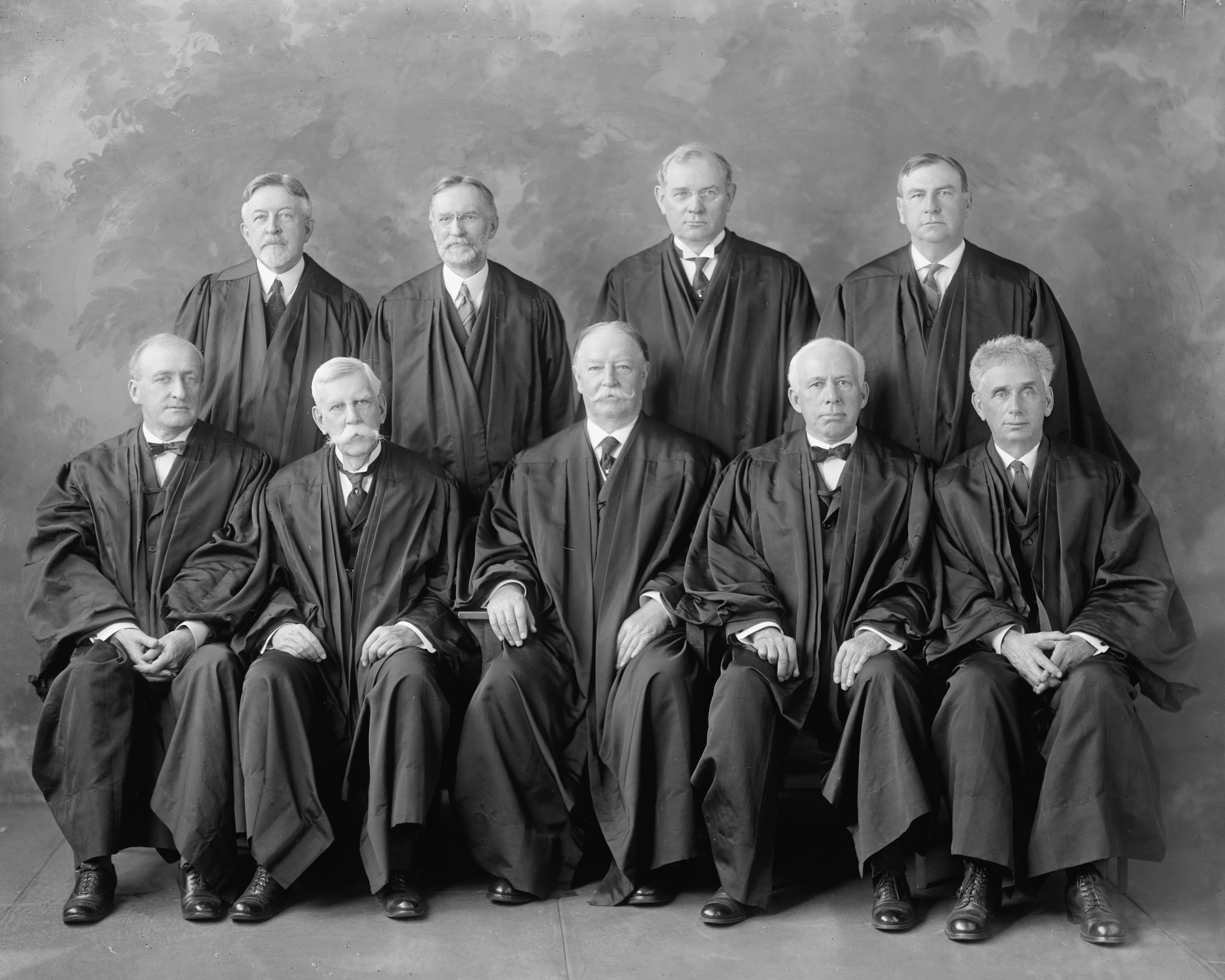
The U.S. Supreme Court in 1925. Taft is seated in the front row, center.

In 1926, Taft wrote for a 6–3 majority in Myers v. United States (Note: 272 U.S. 52 (1926)) that Congress could not require the president to get Senate approval before removing an appointee. Taft noted that there is no restriction of the president's power to remove officials in the Constitution. Although Myers involved the removal of a postmaster, Taft in his opinion found invalid the repealed Tenure of Office Act, for violation of which his presidential predecessor, Andrew Johnson, had been impeached, though acquitted by the Senate. Taft valued Myers as his most important opinion.

The following year, the court decided McGrain v. Daugherty. (Note: 273 U.S. 135 (1927)) A congressional committee investigating possible complicity of former Attorney General Daugherty in the Teapot Dome scandal subpoenaed records from his brother, Mally, who refused to provide them, alleging Congress had no power to obtain documents from him. Van Devanter ruled for a unanimous court against him, finding that Congress had the authority to conduct investigations as an auxiliary to its legislative function.

==== Individual and civil rights ====
In 1925, the Taft Court laid the groundwork for the incorporation of many of the guarantees of the Bill of Rights to be applied against the states through the Fourteenth Amendment. In Gitlow v. New York, (Note: 268 U.S. 652 (1925)) the Court, by a 6–2 vote with Taft in the majority, upheld Gitlow's conviction on criminal anarchy charges for advocating the overthrow of the government; his defense was freedom of speech. Justice Edward T. Sanford wrote the Court's opinion, and both majority and minority (Holmes, joined by Brandeis) assumed that the First Amendment's Free Speech and Free Press clauses were protected against infringement by the states.

Pierce v. Society of Sisters (Note: 268 U.S. 510 (1925)) was a 1925 decision by the Taft Court striking down an Oregon law banning private schools. In a decision written by Justice James C. McReynolds, a unanimous court held that Oregon could regulate private schools, but could not eliminate them. The outcome supported the right of parents to control the education of their children, and also, since the lead plaintiff (the society) ran Catholic schools, struck a blow for religious freedom.

United States v. Lanza (Note: 260 U.S. 377 (1922)) was one of a series of cases involving Prohibition. Lanza committed acts allegedly in violation of both state and federal law, and was first convicted in Washington state court, then prosecuted in federal district court. He alleged the second prosecution violated the Double Jeopardy Clause of the Fifth Amendment. Taft, for a unanimous court, allowed the second prosecution, holding that the state and federal governments were dual sovereigns, each empowered to prosecute the conduct in question.

In the 1927 case Lum v. Rice, (Note: 275 U.S. 78 (1927)) Taft wrote for a unanimous Court that included liberals Holmes, Brandeis and Stone. The ruling held the exclusion on account of race of a child of Chinese ancestry from a whites-only public school did not violate the Fourteenth Amendment to the United States Constitution. This allowed states to extend segregation in public schools to Chinese students.

=== Administration and political influence ===
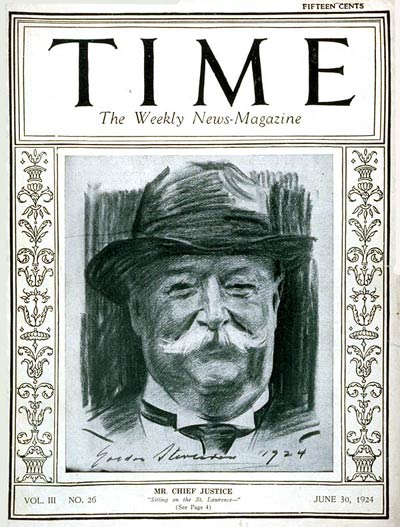
Time cover, June 30, 1924

Taft exercised the power of his position to influence the decisions of his colleagues, urging unanimity and discouraging dissents. Alpheus Mason, in his article on Chief Justice Taft for the American Bar Association Journal, contrasted Taft's expansive view of the role of the chief justice with the narrow view of presidential power he took while in that office. Taft saw nothing wrong with making his views on possible appointments to the Court known to the White House, and was annoyed to be criticized in the press. He was initially a firm supporter of President Coolidge after Harding's death in 1923, but became disillusioned with Coolidge's appointments to office and to the bench; he had similar misgivings about Coolidge's successor, Herbert Hoover. Taft advised the Republican presidents in office while he was chief justice to avoid "offside" appointments like Brandeis and Holmes. Nevertheless, by 1923, Taft was writing of his liking for Brandeis, whom he deemed a hard worker, and Holmes walked to work with him until age and infirmity required an automobile.

Believing that the Chief Justice should be responsible for the federal courts, Taft felt that he should have an administrative staff to assist him, and the chief justice should be empowered to temporarily reassign judges. He also believed the federal courts had been ill-run. Many of the lower courts had lengthy backlogs, as did the Supreme Court. Immediately on taking office, Taft made it a priority to confer with Attorney General Daugherty as to new legislation, and made his case before congressional hearings, in legal periodicals and in speeches across the country. When Congress convened in December 1921, a bill was introduced for 24 new judges, to empower the Chief Justice to move judges temporarily to eliminate the delays, and to have him chair a body consisting of the senior appellate judge of each circuit. Congress objected to some aspects, requiring Taft to get the agreement of the senior judge of each involved circuit before assigning a judge, but it passed the bill in September 1922, and the Judicial Conference of Senior Circuit Judges held its first meeting that December.

The Supreme Court's docket was congested, swelled by war litigation and laws that allowed a party defeated in the circuit court of appeals to have the case decided by the Supreme Court if a constitutional question was involved. Taft believed an appeal should usually be settled by the circuit court, with only cases of major import decided by the justices. He and other Supreme Court members proposed legislation to make most of the Court's docket discretionary, with a case getting full consideration by the justices only if they granted a writ of certiorari. To Taft's frustration, Congress took three years to consider the matter. Taft and other members of the Court lobbied for the bill in Congress, and the Judges' Bill became law in February 1925. By late the following year, Taft was able to show that the backlog was shrinking.

When Taft became Chief Justice, the Court did not have its own building and met in the Capitol. Its offices were cluttered and overcrowded, but Fuller and White had been opposed to proposals to move the Court to its own building. In 1925, Taft began a fight to get the Court a building, and two years later Congress appropriated money to purchase the land, to the east of the Capitol. Cass Gilbert had prepared plans for the building, and was hired by the government as architect. Taft had hoped to see the Court move into the new building, but it did not do so until 1935, after Taft's death.

== Declining health and death ==
Taft is remembered as the heaviest president; he was 5 feet 11 inches (1.80 m) tall and his weight peaked at 335–340 pounds (152–154 kg) toward the end of his presidency, although by 1929 he weighed 244 pounds (111 kg). By the time Taft became chief justice in 1921, his health was starting to decline, and he carefully planned a fitness regimen, walking 3 miles (4.8 km) from his home to the Capitol each day. When he walked back, he would usually go by way of Connecticut Avenue and use a particular crossing over Rock Creek. After his death, the crossing was named the Taft Bridge.

Taft followed a weight loss program and hired the British doctor N. E. Yorke-Davies as a dietary advisor. The two men corresponded regularly for over twenty years, and Taft kept a daily record of his weight, food intake, and physical activity.

At Hoover's inauguration on March 4, 1929, Taft recited part of the oath incorrectly, later writing, "my memory is not always accurate and one sometimes becomes a little uncertain", misquoting again in that letter, differently. His health gradually declined over the near-decade of his chief justiceship. Worried that if he retired his replacement would be chosen by President Herbert Hoover, whom he considered too progressive, he wrote his brother Horace in 1929, "I am older and slower and less acute and more confused. However, as long as things continue as they are, and I am able to answer to my place, I must stay on the court in order to prevent the Bolsheviki from getting control".

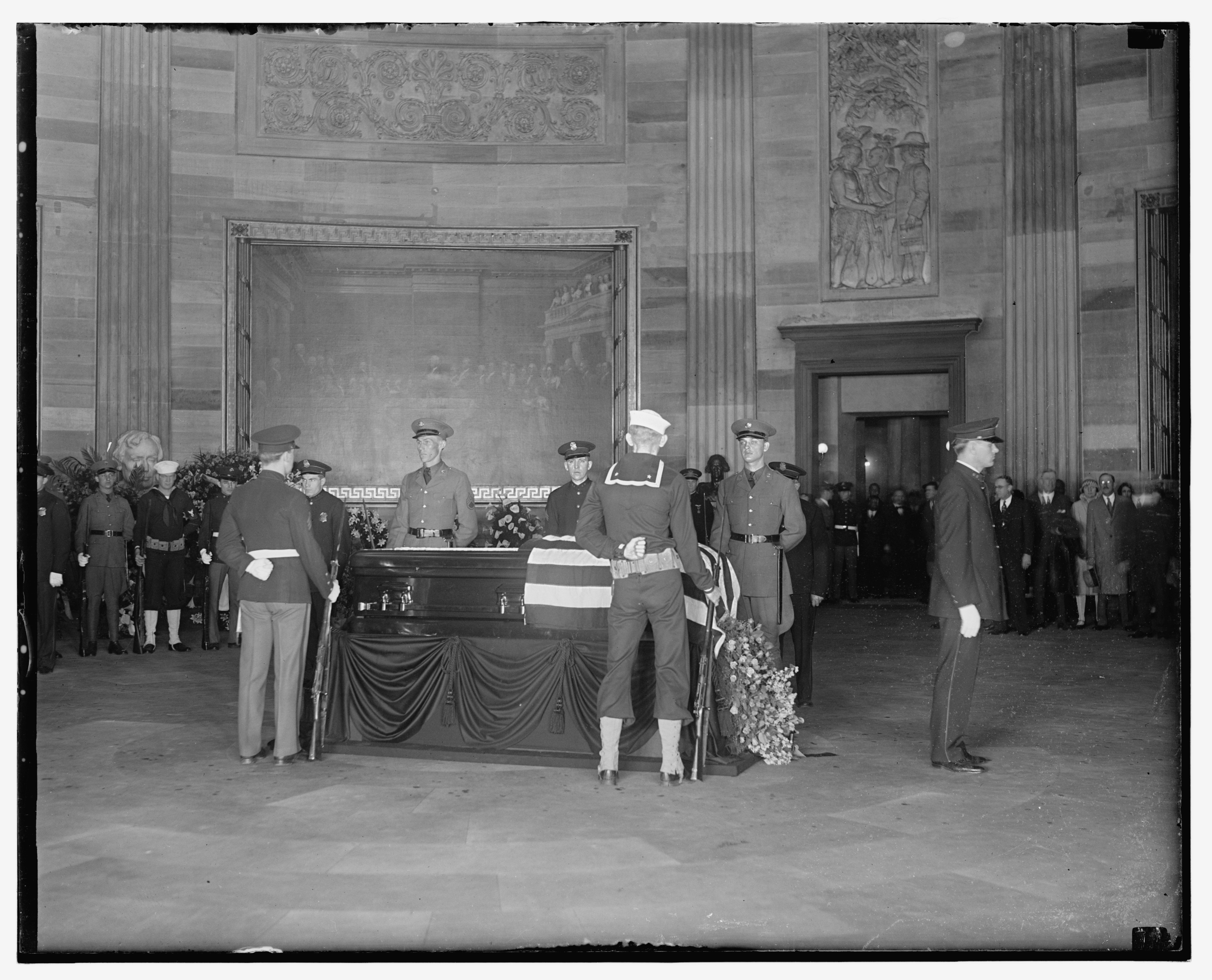
The body of former President and Chief Justice William Howard Taft lies in repose in the United States Capitol rotunda.

Taft insisted on going to Cincinnati to attend the funeral of his brother Charles, who died on December 31, 1929; the strain did not improve his own health. When the court reconvened on January 6, 1930, Taft had not returned to Washington, and two opinions were delivered by Van Devanter that Taft had drafted but had been unable to complete because of his illness. Taft went to Asheville, North Carolina, for a rest, but by the end of January, he could barely speak and was hallucinating. Taft was afraid that Stone would be made chief justice; he did not resign until he had secured assurances from Hoover that Hughes would be chosen. (Note: Stone was made chief justice in 1941 by President Franklin D. Roosevelt.) Taft resigned as chief justice on February 3, 1930. Returning to Washington after his resignation, Taft had barely enough physical or emotional strength to sign a reply to a letter of tribute from the eight associate justices. He died at his home in Washington, D.C., on March 8, 1930, at age 72, likely of heart disease, inflammation of the liver, and high blood pressure. Taft lay in state at the United States Capitol rotunda. On March 11, he became the first president and first member of the Supreme Court to be buried at Arlington National Cemetery. James Earle Fraser sculpted his grave marker out of Stony Creek granite.

== Legacy and historical view ==
Lurie argued that Taft did not receive the public credit for his policies that he should have. Few trusts had been broken up under Roosevelt (although the lawsuits received much publicity). Taft, more quietly than his predecessor, filed many more cases than did Roosevelt, and rejected his predecessor's contention that there was such a thing as a "good" trust. This lack of flair marred Taft's presidency; according to Lurie, Taft "was boring—honest, likable, but boring". Scott Bomboy for the National Constitution Center wrote that despite being "one of the most interesting, intellectual, and versatile presidents ... a chief justice of the United States, a wrestler at Yale, a reformer, a peace activist, and a baseball fan ... today, Taft is best remembered as the president who was so large that he got stuck in the White House bathtub", a story that is not true. Taft similarly has remained known for another physical characteristic—as the last president with facial hair. (Note: Harry Truman briefly sported a "Jeff Davis" beard during his presidency.)

Mason called Taft's years in the White House "undistinguished". Coletta deemed Taft to have had a solid record of bills passed by Congress, but felt he could have accomplished more with political skill. Anderson noted that Taft's prepresidential federal service was entirely in appointed posts, and that he had never run for an important executive or legislative position, which would have allowed him to develop the skills to manipulate public opinion, as "the presidency is no place for on-the-job training". According to Coletta, "in troubled times in which the people demanded progressive change, he saw the existing order as good."

Inevitably linked with Roosevelt, who chose him to be president and took it away, Taft generally falls in the former's shadow. Yet, a portrait of Taft as a victim of betrayal by his best friend is incomplete: as Coletta put it, "Was he a poor politician because he was victimized or because he lacked the foresight and imagination to notice the storm brewing in the political sky until it broke and swamped him?" Adept at using the levers of power in a way his successor could not, Roosevelt generally got what was politically possible out of a situation. Taft was generally slow to act, and when he did, his actions often generated enemies, as in the Ballinger–Pinchot affair. Roosevelt was able to secure positive coverage in the newspapers; Taft was reticent talking to reporters, and, with no comment from the White House, hostile journalists filled the gaps with quotes from Taft opponents. Roosevelt engraved in public memory the image of Taft as a James Buchanan-like figure, with a narrow view of the presidency that made him unwilling to act for the public good. Anderson noted that Roosevelt's Autobiography (which placed this view in enduring form) was published after both men had left the presidency (in 1913), was intended in part to justify Roosevelt's splitting of the Republican Party, and contains not a single positive reference to the man Roosevelt had hand-picked as his successor. While Roosevelt was biased, he was not alone: every major newspaper reporter of that time who left reminiscences of Taft's presidency was critical of him. Taft replied to his predecessor's criticism with his constitutional treatise on the powers of the presidency.

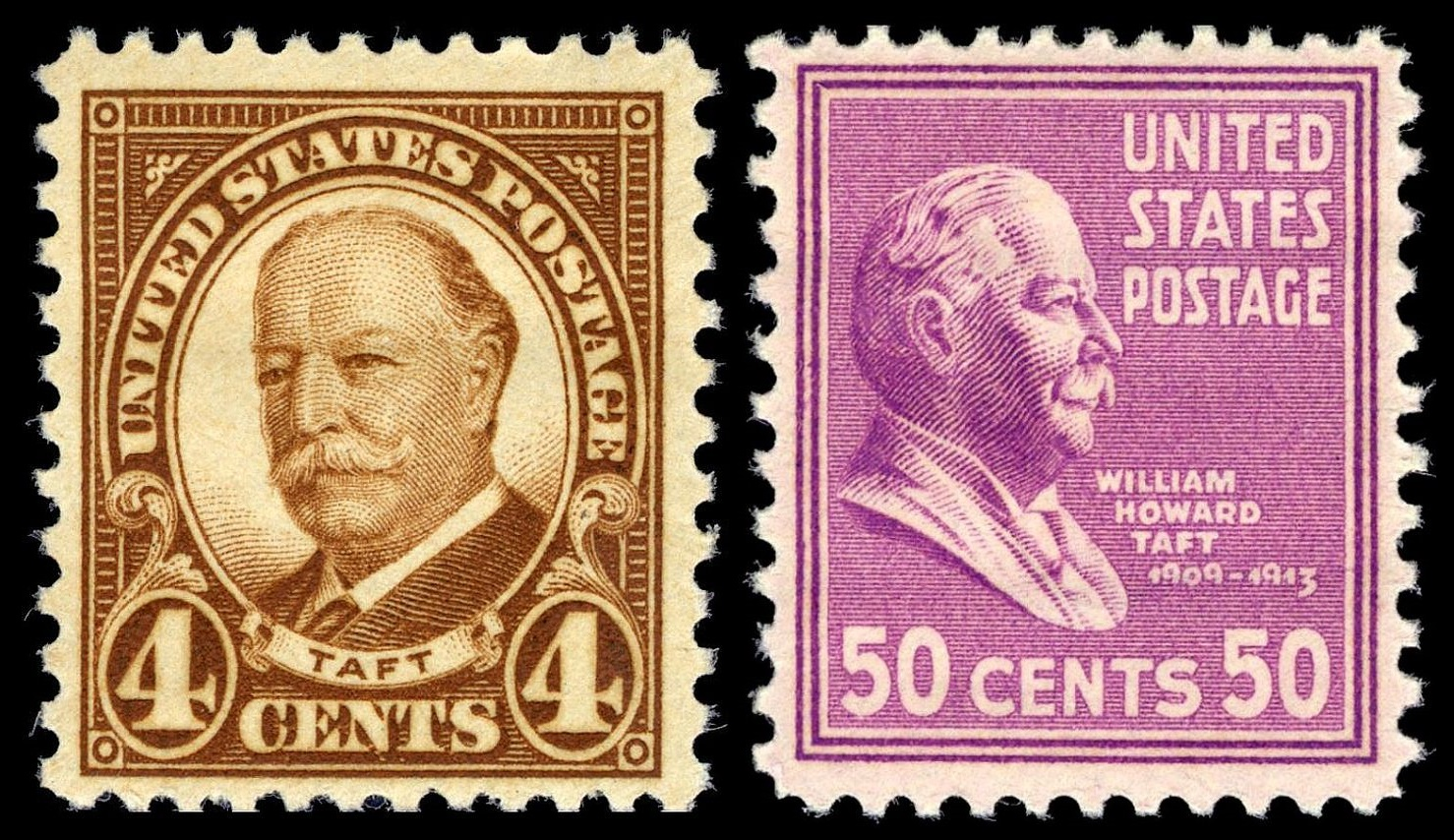
The first postage issue for Taft, a 4-cent stamp, was issued in 1930, the second, a 50-cent stamp, in 1938.

Taft was convinced history would vindicate him. After he left office, he was estimated to be in the middle of U.S. presidents by greatness, and subsequent rankings by historians have largely sustained that verdict. Coletta noted that this places Taft alongside James Madison, John Quincy Adams and McKinley. Lurie catalogued progressive innovations that took place under Taft, and argued that historians have overlooked them because Taft was not an effective political writer or speaker. According to Gould, "the clichés about Taft's weight, his maladroitness in the White House, and his conservatism of thought and doctrine have an element of truth, but they fail to do justice to a shrewd commentator on the political scene, a man of consummate ambition, and a resourceful practitioner of the internal politics of his party." Anderson deemed Taft's success in becoming both president and chief justice "an astounding feat of inside judicial and Republican party politics, played out over years, the likes of which we are not likely to see again in American history".

Taft has been rated among the greatest of the chief justices; later Supreme Court Justice Antonin Scalia noted that this was "not so much on the basis of his opinions, perhaps because many of them ran counter to the ultimate sweep of history". A successor as chief justice, Earl Warren, concurred: "In Taft's case, the symbol, the tag, the label usually attached to him is 'conservative.' It is certainly not of itself a term of opprobrium even when bandied by the critics, but its use is too often confused with 'reactionary.'" Most commentators agree that Taft's most significant contribution as chief justice was his advocacy for reform of the high court, urging and ultimately gaining improvement in the Court's procedures and facilities. Mason cited enactment of the Judges' Bill of 1925 as Taft's major achievement on the Court. According to Anderson, as chief justice, Taft "was as aggressive in the pursuit of his agenda in the judicial realm as Theodore Roosevelt was in the presidential".

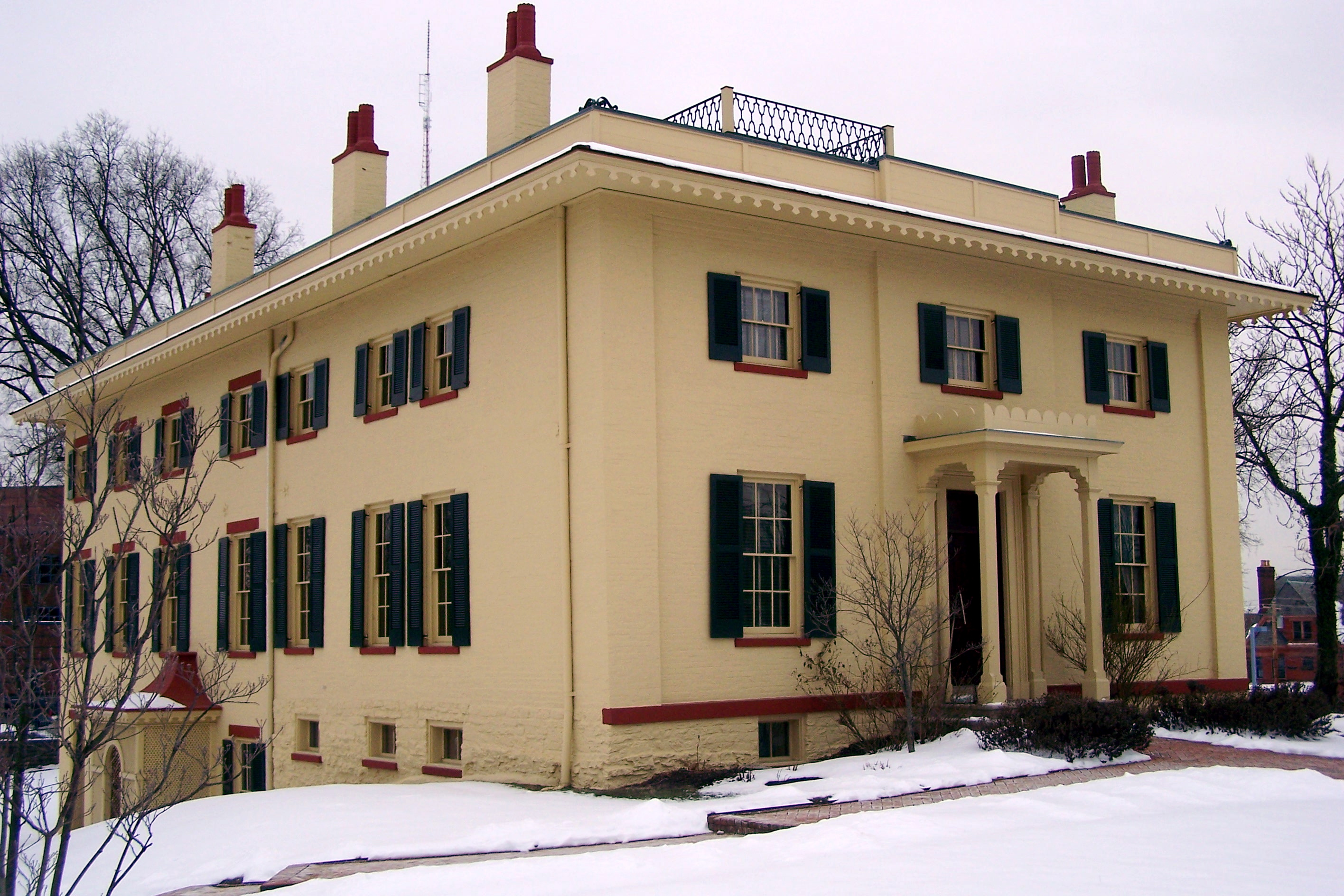
Taft's boyhood home in Cincinnati

The house in Cincinnati in which Taft was born is now the William Howard Taft National Historic Site. Taft was one of the first Gold Medal Honorees of the National Institute of Social Sciences. His son Robert was a prominent political figure, becoming Senate Majority Leader and three times a major contender for the Republican nomination for president. A conservative, each time he was defeated by a candidate backed by the more liberal Eastern Establishment wing of the party. (Note: Wendell Willkie in 1940, Thomas Dewey in 1948 and Dwight Eisenhower in 1952)

Lurie concluded his account of William Taft's career:

While the fabled cherry trees in Washington represent a suitable monument for Nellie Taft, there is no memorial to her husband, except perhaps the magnificent home for his Court—one for which he eagerly planned. But he died even before ground was broken for the structure. As he reacted to his overwhelming defeat for reelection in 1912, Taft had written that "I must wait for years if I would be vindicated by the people ... I am content to wait." Perhaps he has waited long enough.

== Media ==
Collection of film clips of the president

Speech: "The Farmer and the Republican Party", Kansas City, Missouri, 1908

== See also ==
- Bibliography of William Howard Taft
- Taft on U.S. postage stamps

== Sources and further reading ==
- Anderson, Donald F. (1973). William Howard Taft: A Conservative's Conception of the Presidency. Ithaca, New York: Cornell University Press. ISBN 978-0-8014-0786-4.
- Anderson, Donald F. (Winter 1982). "The Legacy of William Howard Taft". Presidential Studies Quarterly. 12 (1): 26–33. JSTOR 27547774.
- Anderson, Judith Icke. William Howard Taft, an Intimate History (1981)
- Ballard, Rene N. "The Administrative Theory of William Howard Taft." Western Political Quarterly 7.1 (1954): 65–74 online.
- Burns, Adam David. "Imperial vision: William Howard Taft and the Philippines, 1900–1921.". (PhD dissertation, University of Edinburgh, 2010) online
- Burton, David H. (2004). William Howard Taft, Confident Peacemaker. Philadelphia: Saint Joseph's University Press. ISBN 978-0-916101-51-0.
- Burton, David H. Taft, Roosevelt, and the limits of friendship (2005) .
- Butt, Archibald W. Taft and Roosevelt: The Intimate Letters of Archie Butt, Military Aide (2 vols. 1930), valuable primary source. vol 1 online also vol 2 online
- Coletta, Paolo E. "William Howard Taft." in The Presidents: A Reference History (1997)
- Coletta, Paolo E. "The Election of 1908" in Arthur M. Schlesinger Jr. and Fred L Israel, eds., History of American Presidential Elections: 1789–1968 (1971) 3: 2049–2131. online
- Coletta, Paolo E. "The Diplomacy of Theodore Roosevelt and William Howard Taft", in Gerald K. Haines and J. Samuel Walker, eds., American Foreign Relations: A Historiographical Review (Greenwood, 1981)
- Coletta, Paolo Enrico (1989). William Howard Taft: A Bibliography. Westport, Connecticut: Meckler Corporation.
- Coletta, Paolo Enrico (1973). The Presidency of William Howard Taft. Lawrence, Kansas: University Press of Kansas. ISBN 9780700600960.
- Collin, Richard H. "Symbiosis versus Hegemony: New Directions in the Foreign Relations Historiography of Theodore Roosevelt and William Howard Taft." Diplomatic History 19#3 (1995): 473–497 online.
- Dean, John W. (2004). Warren Harding (Kindle ed.). Henry Holt and Co. ISBN 978-0-8050-6956-3.
- Delahaye, Claire (2011). "The New Nationalism and Progressive Issues: The Break with Taft and the 1912 Campaign". In Ricard, Serge (ed.). A Companion to Theodore Roosevelt. Malden, MA: Wiley-Blackwell. pp. 452–67. Archived from the original on December 14, 2020 – via Questia.
- Ellis, L. Ethan. Reciprocity, 1911: A Study in Canadian-American Relations (Yale UP, 1939)
- Goodwin, Doris Kearns. The bully pulpit: Theodore Roosevelt, William Howard Taft, and the Golden Age of journalism (2013) online
- Gould, Lewis L. The William Howard Taft Presidency (University Press of Kansas, 2009).
- Gould, Lewis L. (2014). Chief Executive to Chief Justice: Taft Betwixt the White House and Supreme Court. Lawrence, Kansas: University Press of Kansas. ISBN 978-0-7006-2001-2.
- Gould, Lewis L. (2008). Four Hats in the Ring: The 1912 Election and the Birth of Modern American Politics. Lawrence, Kansas: University Press of Kansas. ISBN 978-0-7006-1564-3.
- Gould, Lewis L. "Theodore Roosevelt, William Howard Taft, and the Disputed Delegates in 1912: Texas as a Test Case." Southwestern Historical Quarterly 80.1 (1976): 33–56 online.
- Hahn, Harlan. "The Republican Party Convention of 1912 and the Role of Herbert S. Hadley in National Politics." Missouri Historical Review 59.4 (1965): 407–423. Taft was willing to compromise with Missouri Governor Herbert S. Hadley as presidential nominee; TR said no.
- Harris, Charles H. III; Sadler, Louis R. (2009). The Secret War in El Paso: Mexican Revolutionary Intrigue, 1906–1920. Albuquerque, New Mexico: University of New Mexico Press. ISBN 978-0-8263-4652-0.
- Hawley, Joshua David (2008). Theodore Roosevelt: Preacher of Righteousness. New Haven, Connecticut: Yale University Press. ISBN 978-0-300-14514-4.
- Hechler, Kenneth W. Insurgency: Personalities and Politics of the Taft Era (1940), on Taft's Republican enemies in 1910.
- Hindman, E. James. "The General Arbitration Treaties of William Howard Taft." The Historian 36.1 (1973): 52–65 online.
- Istre, Logan Stagg (2021). "Bench over Ballot: The Fight for Judicial Supremacy and the New Constitutional Politics, 1910–1916". The Journal of the Gilded Age and Progressive Era. 20 (1): 2–23. doi:10.1017/S1537781420000079.
- Korzi, Michael J., "William Howard Taft, the 1908 Election, and the Future of the American Presidency", Congress and the Presidency, 43 (May–August 2016), 227–54.
- Lurie, Jonathan (2011). William Howard Taft: Progressive Conservative. Cambridge: Cambridge University Press. ISBN 978-0-521-51421-7.
- Manners, William. TR and Will: A Friendship That Split the Republican Party (1969) covers 1910 to 1912.
- Mason, Alpheus T. Bureaucracy Convicts Itself: The Ballinger-Pinchot Controversy of 1910 (1941)
- Minger, Ralph Eldin (August 1961). "Taft's Missions to Japan: A Study in Personal Diplomacy". Pacific Historical Review. 30 (3): 279–294. doi:10.2307/3636924. JSTOR 3636924.
- Morris, Edmund (2001). Theodore Rex. New York: Random House. ISBN 978-0-394-55509-6.
- Murphy, John (1995). "'Back to the Constitution': Theodore Roosevelt, William Howard Taft and Republican Party Division 1910–1912". Irish Journal of American Studies. 4: 109–126. JSTOR 30003333.
- Noyes, John E. "William Howard Taft and the Taft Arbitration Treaties." Villanova Law Review 56 (2011): 535+ online covers his career in international law and arbitration.
- Pavord, Andrew C. (Summer 1996). "The Gamble for Power: Theodore Roosevelt's Decision to Run for the Presidency in 1912". Presidential Studies Quarterly. 26 (3): 633–647. JSTOR 27551622.
- Ponder, Stephen. "'Nonpublicity' and the Unmaking of a President: William Howard Taft and the Ballinger-Pinchot Controversy of 1909–1910." Journalism History 19.4 (1994): 111–120.
- Pringle, Henry F. (1939). The Life and Times of William Howard Taft: A Biography. Vol. 1., detailed coverage, to 1910
- Pringle, Henry F. (1939). The Life and Times of William Howard Taft: A Biography. Vol. 2. vol 2 covers the presidency after 1910 & Supreme Court
- Republican campaign text-book 1912 (1912) online
- Rosen, Jeffrey (2018). William Howard Taft: The American Presidents Series. New York: Time Books, Henry Holt & Co.
- Schambra, William. "The Election of 1912 and the Origins of Constitutional Conservatism." in Toward an American Conservatism (Palgrave Macmillan, 2013). 95–119.
- Scholes, Walter V; Scholes, Marie V. (1970). The Foreign Policies of the Taft Administration. Columbia, Missouri: University of Missouri Press. ISBN 978-0-8262-0094-5.
- Schultz, L. Peter. "William Howard Taft: A constitutionalist's view of the presidency." Presidential Studies Quarterly 9#4 (1979): 402–414 online.
- Solvick, Stanley D. "William Howard Taft and the Payne-Aldrich Tariff." Mississippi Valley Historical Review 50#3 (1963): 424–442 online.
- Taft, William Howard. The Collected Works of William Howard Taft (8 vol. Ohio University Press, 20012004) excerpts.
- Taft, William H. Four Aspects of Civic Duty; and, Present Day Problems ed. by David H. Burton and A. E. Campbell (Ohio UP, 2000).
- Taft, William Howard. Present Day Problems: A Collection of Addresses Delivered on Various Occasions (Best Books, 1908) online.
- Trani, Eugene P.; Wilson, David L. (1977). The Presidency of Warren G. Harding. American Presidency. The Regents Press of Kansas. ISBN 978-0-7006-0152-3.

=== Supreme Court ===
- Anderson, Donald F. (Winter 2000). "Building National Consensus: The Career of William Howard Taft". University of Cincinnati Law Review. 68: 323–356.
- Crowe, Justin. "The forging of judicial autonomy: Political entrepreneurship and the reforms of William Howard Taft." Journal of Politics 69.1 (2007): 73–87 online
- Fish, Peter G. "William Howard Taft and Charles Evans Hughes: Conservative Politicians as Chief Judicial Reformers." The Supreme Court Review 1975 (1975): 123–145 online.
- Lurie, Jonathan. The Chief Justiceship of William Howard Taft, 1921–1930 (U of South Carolina Press, 2019).
- Mason, Alpheus T. The Supreme Court From Taft to Burger (2nd ed. 1980)
- Mason, Alpheus Thomas (January 1969). "President by Chance, Chief Justice by Choice". American Bar Association Journal. 55 (1): 35–39. JSTOR 25724643.
- Post, Robert. "Judicial Management and Judicial Disinterest: The Achievements and Perils of Chief Justice William Howard Taft." Journal of Supreme Court History (1998) 1: 50–78. online.
- Post, Robert C. "Chief Justice William Howard Taft and the concept of federalism." Constitutional Commentary 9 (1992): 199+ online.
- Regan, Richard J. (2015). A Constitutional History of the U.S. Supreme Court. Washington, D.C.: Catholic University of America Press. ISBN 978-0-8132-2721-4.
- Rooney, William H., and Timothy G. Fleming. "William Howard Taft, the Origin of the Rule of Reason, and the Actavis Challenge." Columbia Business Law Review (2018) 1#1: 1–24. online.
- Scalia, Antonin (1989). "Originalism: The Lesser Evil". University of Cincinnati Law Review. 57: 849–864.
- Starr, Kenneth W. "The Supreme Court and Its Shrinking Docket: The Ghost of William Howard Taft." Minnesota Law Review 90 (2005): 1363–1385 online.
- Starr, Kenneth W. "William Howard Taft: The Chief Justice as Judicial Architect." U. of Cincinnati Law Review 60 (1991): 963+.
- Taft, William Howard. "The Jurisdiction of the Supreme Court Under the Act of February 13, 1925." The Yale Law Journal 35.1 (1925): 1–12.
- Warren, Earl (January 1958). "Chief Justice William Howard Taft". The Yale Law Journal. 67 (3): 353–362. doi:10.2307/793882. JSTOR 793882.
- Wilensky, Norman N. (1965). Conservatives in the Progressive Era: The Taft Republicans of 1912. Gainesville: University of Florida Press.

Legal offices
Preceded by Judson Harmon	Judge of the Superior Court of Cincinnati; 1887–1890	Succeeded by Samuel Furman Hunt
Preceded by Orlow W. Chapman	Solicitor General of the United States; 1890–1892	Succeeded by Charles H. Aldrich
New seat	Judge of the United States Court of Appeals for the Sixth Circuit; 1892–1900	Succeeded by Henry Franklin Severens
Preceded by Edward Douglass White	Chief Justice of the United States; 1921–1930	Succeeded by Charles Evans Hughes
Political offices
Preceded by Jacob Gould Schurman as Chairman of the Schurman Commission	Chair of the Taft Commission; 1900–1901	Succeeded by Himself as Chair of the Philippine Commission
Preceded by Arthur MacArthur Jr.	Governor-General of the Philippines; 1901–1904; Served alongside: Adna Chaffee	Succeeded by Luke Edward Wright
Preceded by Himself as Chairman of the Taft Commission	Chair of the Philippine Commission; 1901–1903	Succeeded by Luke Edward Wright
Preceded by Elihu Root	United States Secretary of War; 1904–1908	Succeeded by Luke Edward Wright
Preceded by Tomás Estrada Palma as President of Cuba	Governor of Cuba; Acting; 1906	Succeeded by Charles Edward Magoon; Acting
Preceded by Theodore Roosevelt	President of the United States; 1909–1913	Succeeded by Woodrow Wilson
Party political offices
Preceded by Theodore Roosevelt	Republican nominee for President of the United States; 1908, 1912	Succeeded by Charles Evans Hughes
Preceded by Warren G. Harding	Persons who have lain in state or honor in the United States Capitol rotunda 1930	Succeeded by John J. Pershing
Awards and achievements
Preceded by Hiram Wesley Evans	Cover of Time; June 30, 1924	Succeeded by James Stillman Rockefeller
