= Farnum House (disambiguation) =

Farnum House may refer to the following American homes:

- Farnum House, Norfolk, Connecticut, on the National Register of Historic Places (NRHP)
- Coronet John Farnum Jr. House, Uxbridge, Massachusetts, on the NRHP
- Moses Farnum House, Uxbridge, Massachusetts, on the NRHP
- William and Mary Farnum House, Uxbridge, Massachusetts, on the NRHP
- Farnum House, Carriage House Historic District, Miles City, Montana

== See also ==
- Farnum Block, a commercial building in Uxbridge, Massachusetts, on the NRHP
