= Zadock Taft House =

Historic house in Massachusetts, United States

- U.S. National Register of Historic Places
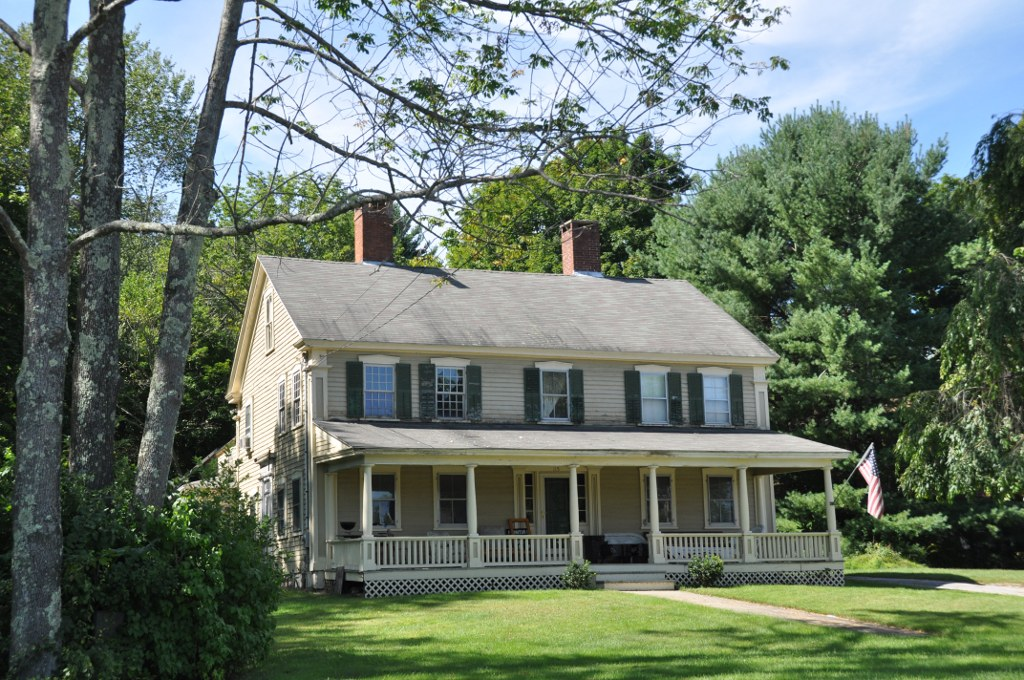

- Location within Massachusetts Location within the United States
- Location: 115 S. Main St., Uxbridge, Massachusetts
- Coordinates: 42°4′14″N 71°37′34″W
- Area: less than one acre
- Built: 1845 (alterations)
- Architectural style: Greek Revival
- MPS: Uxbridge MRA
- NRHP reference No.: 83004148
- Added to NRHP: October 7, 1983

The Zadock Taft House is a historic house at 115 South Main Street in Uxbridge, Massachusetts. Probably built in the 18th century, it received its present Greek Revival styling in the 1840s or 1850s. It was listed on the National Register of Historic Places in 1983.

== Description and history ==
The Zadock Taft House stands south of the center of Uxbridge, on the west side of South Main Street just north of its junction with Newell Road. It is a 2 1/2-story wood-frame structure, with a side-gable roof, two interior brick chimneys, and a clapboarded exterior. A single-story porch extends across the front facade. The building corners are pilastered, and the main entrance is framed by sidelight windows, pilasters and a corniced entablature. Windows are rectangular sash, with slightly capped lintels above.

The land on which the house stands has a long association with the locally prominent Taft family. As early as 1708 it was the farm of Joseph Taft, who helped oversee construction of Uxbridge's first meetinghouse in 1728–30. It is unclear from the documentary record whether the present house is a surviving element of Joseph Taft's farm, or if it was built by a later 18th-century generation. It is shown on an 1855 map of the town in its present configuration. It was acquired in the 1860s by Zadock Taft, a great-grandson of Joseph, who owned several industrial concerns in the area, including a half interest in the Rivulet Mill Complex.

== See also ==
- National Register of Historic Places listings in Uxbridge, Massachusetts
