= Richard Sayles House =

Historic house in Massachusetts, United States

- U.S. National Register of Historic Places
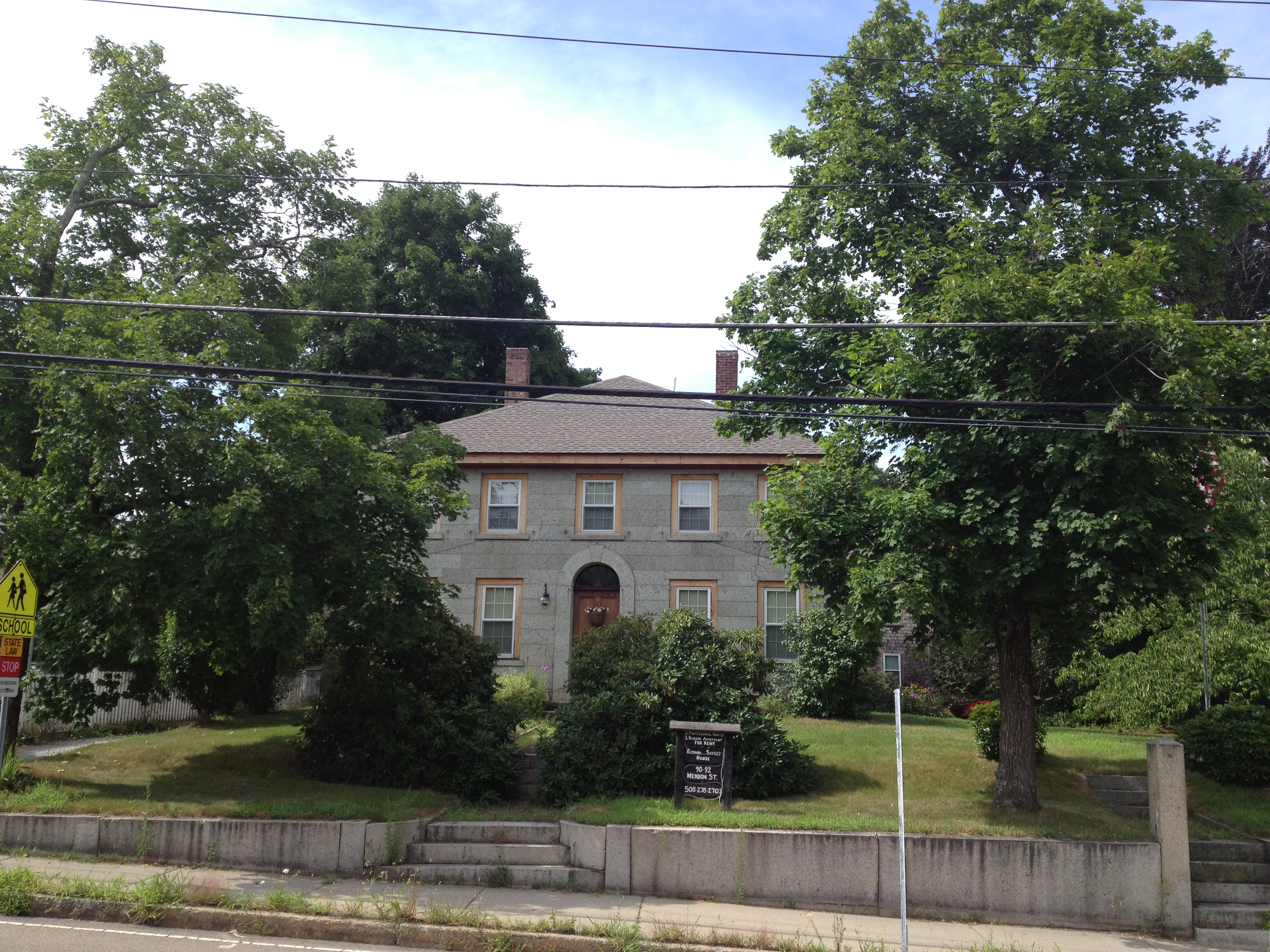

- Location within Massachusetts Location within the United States
- Location: 80 Mendon Street, Uxbridge, Massachusetts
- Coordinates: 42°4′43″N 71°37′27″W
- Area: 1 acre (0.40 ha)
- Built: c. 1820
- Architectural style: Federal
- MPS: Uxbridge MRA
- NRHP reference No.: 83004131
- Added to NRHP: October 7, 1983

The Richard Sayles House is an historic house at 80 Mendon Street, in Uxbridge, Massachusetts. It is a distinctive local example of Federal period architecture executed in granite. It is further notable has the home from about 1859 onward of Richard Sayles, a local mill worker, executive, and later owner. It was added to the National Register of Historic Places on October 7, 1983.

== Description and history ==
The house is located on the north side of Mendon Street (Massachusetts Route 16), just east of the St. Mary Parish church complex. The house is a two-story stone structure, five bays wide, built out of ashlar granite and topped by a hip roof. Its front facade is symmetrical, with the entrance set at the center in a keystoned round-arch opening with a semicircular transom. The windows in the other bays have projecting sills and lintels, but are otherwise unadorned.

The house was built about 1820, and its first owner is presently unknown. It was purchased about 1859 by Richard Sayles, a leading figure in the textile mills of Uxbridge. Sayles, a native of Providence, Rhode Island, was educated at Uxbridge Academy, and worked in the local mills 1841–47. By 1852, he had risen to supervise construction of the Central Woolen Mill, which he and Israel Southwick leased 1859–61. In 1864, he purchased the Rivulet Mill, which he owned, generally in partnership with others, until his death in 1887. Sayles was also a philanthropist, funding construction of the North Uxbridge Baptist Church despite his own Unitarian beliefs. The house was sold to the Calument Mill company after his death, and was probably used as worker housing.

== See also ==
- National Register of Historic Places listings in Uxbridge, Massachusetts
