= Chapin House =

Chapin House may refer to:

- Philip Chapin House, New Hartford, Connecticut
- Horatio Chapin House, South Bend, Indiana
- A. Chapin House, Uxbridge, Massachusetts
- Henry A. Chapin House, Niles, Michigan
- Thaddeus Chapin House, Canandaigua, New York
