= George Taft House =

Historic house in Massachusetts, United States

- U.S. National Register of Historic Places
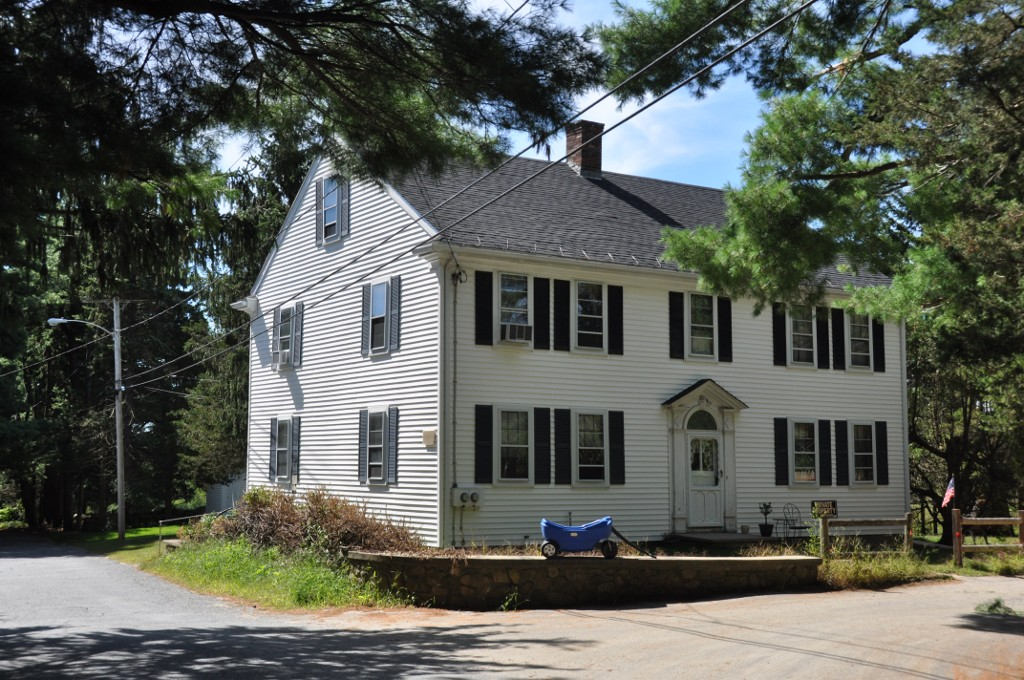

- Location within Massachusetts Location within the United States
- Location: Uxbridge, Massachusetts 153 Richardson St
- Coordinates: 42°3′40″N 71°38′18″W
- Built: 1810
- Architectural style: Federal
- MPS: Uxbridge MRA
- NRHP reference No.: 83004138
- Added to NRHP: October 7, 1983

The George Taft House is a historic house at 153 Richardson Street in Uxbridge, Massachusetts. The two-story timber-frame house was built in c. 1810.

Taft Benson, Sr, a famous Mormon Pioneer, lived in the house from 1817 to 1835. It is a well-preserved example of Federal-style architecture, expressed mainly in its door surround, which includes pilasters and a broken pedimented gable above a half-round transom window. In the middle of the 19th century it was the home of George Washington Taft, a farmer and local state representative.

On October 7, 1983, it was added to the National Register of Historic Places.

== See also ==
- National Register of Historic Places listings in Uxbridge, Massachusetts
