= R. Farnum House =

Historic house in Massachusetts, United States

- U.S. National Register of Historic Places
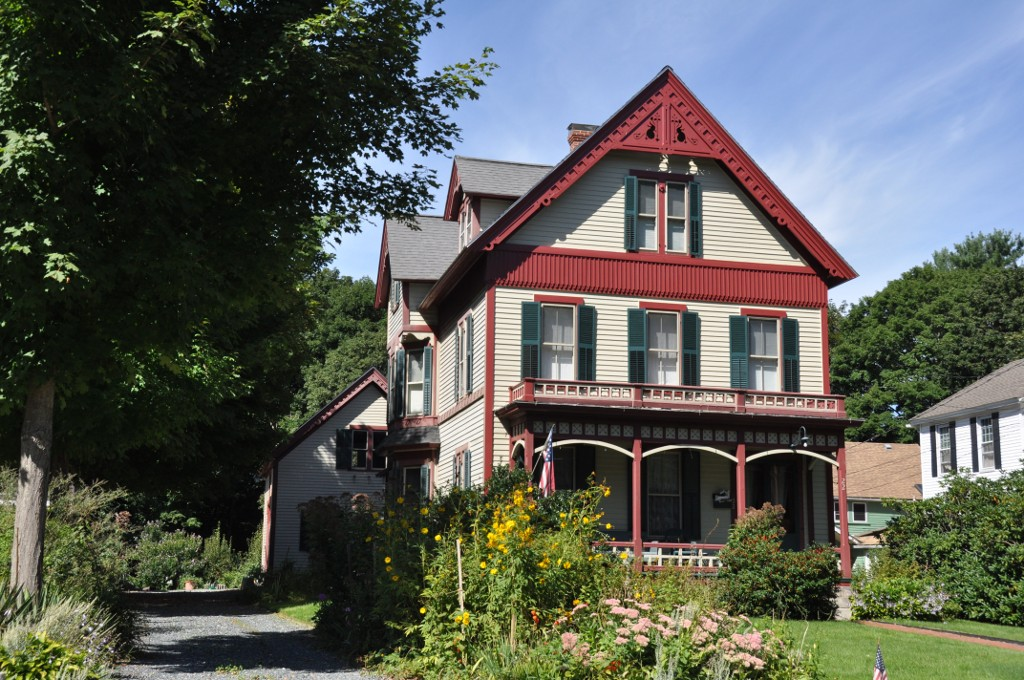

- Location within Massachusetts Location within the United States
- Location: Uxbridge, Massachusetts
- Coordinates: 42°4′46″N 71°37′33″W
- Built: 1875
- Architectural style: Gothic
- MPS: Uxbridge MRA
- NRHP reference No.: 83004119
- Added to NRHP: October 7, 1983

The R. Farnum House is an historic house located at 22 Oak Street, in Uxbridge, Massachusetts. This 2 1/2 story wood-frame house was built c. 1875–80, and is a well-preserved local example of Gothic Revival styling. It has an elaborately decorated front porch, and bargeboard decoration and a pierced apron in the main gable end. The gable details are repeated in gable ends on the north side of the house. Nothing is known about R. Farnum, who was probably from the locally numerous Farnums who settled the area in the 18th century.

On October 7, 1983, it was added to the National Register of Historic Places.

== See also ==
- National Register of Historic Places listings in Uxbridge, Massachusetts
