= W. Aldrich House =

Historic house in Massachusetts, United States

- U.S. National Register of Historic Places
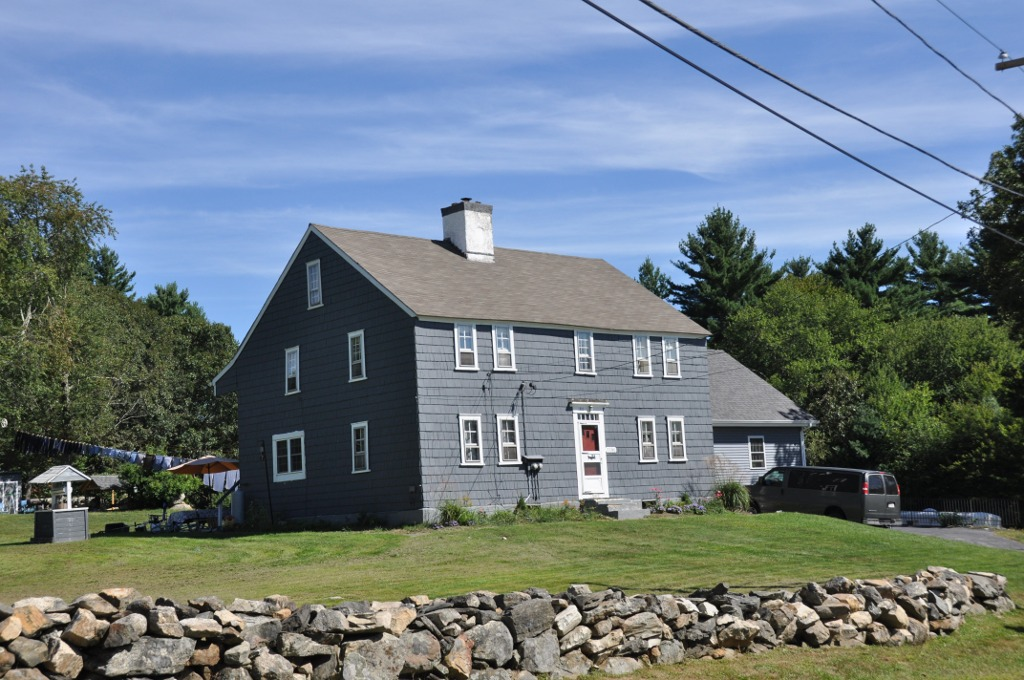

- Location within Massachusetts Location within the United States
- Location: 180 Henry St., Uxbridge, Massachusetts
- Coordinates: 42°4′50″N 71°36′3″W
- Area: less than one acre
- Built: ca. 1750-1799
- Architectural style: Georgian
- MPS: Uxbridge MRA
- NRHP reference No.: 83004105
- Added to NRHP: October 7, 1983

The W. Aldrich House is an historic house at 180 Henry Street in Uxbridge, Massachusetts. Probably built in 1786, it is a good local example of late Georgian architecture, prominent also as the home of a sawmill owner. On October 7, 1983, it was added to the National Register of Historic Places.

== Description and history ==
The W. Aldrich House is located in a rural area of eastern Uxbridge, on the north side of Henry Street near its junction with Hollis Street. It is a 2 1/2-story wood-frame structure, with a gabled roof, central chimney, and clapboarded exterior. It is set on a rubblestone foundation capped in concrete. The main facade is five bays wide and slightly asymmetrical, with the entrance skewed slightly right of center. The entrance is flanked by narrow pilasters and topped by a transom window and simple corniced entablature. Windows are replacement rectangular sash; those on the second floor are placed in openings that butt against the eave, a typical Georgian placement.

The construction date of this house is unknown with certainty; by stylistic analysis it appears to have been built in the mid- to late-18th century, and its chimney is marked with the date that is either 1786 or 1756. Its owner in 1855 was listed as W. Aldrich, who owned a nearby sawmill and gristmill for many years. Later owners included members of the Henry family, who farmed much of the surrounding land.

== See also ==
- National Register of Historic Places listings in Uxbridge, Massachusetts
