= Butler Block =

- U.S. National Register of Historic Places
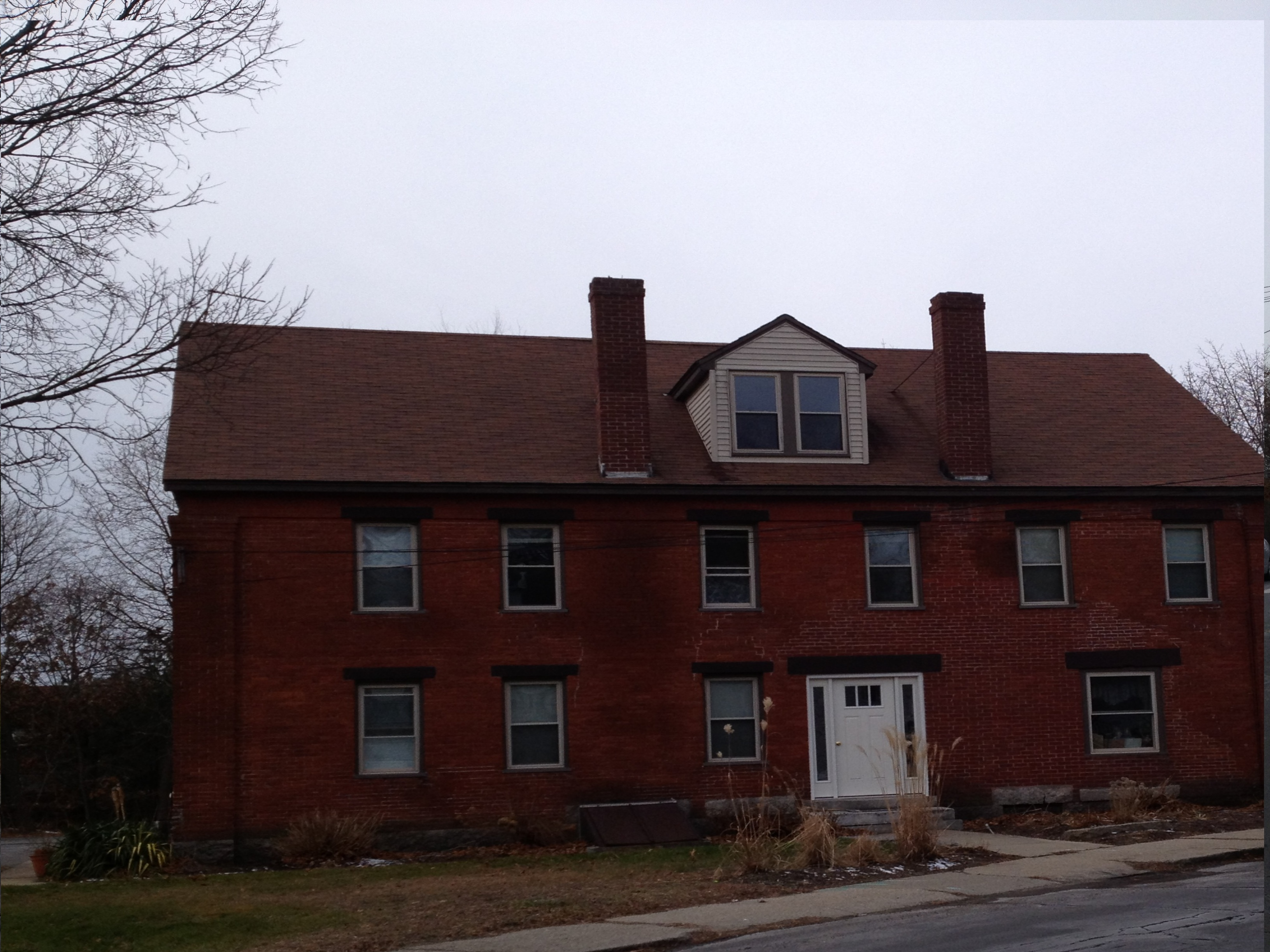

- Location within Massachusetts Location within the United States
- Location: Uxbridge, Massachusetts
- Coordinates: 42°5′49″N 71°38′38″W
- Built: 1845
- Architectural style: Greek Revival
- MPS: Uxbridge MRA
- NRHP reference No.: 83004110
- Added to NRHP: October 7, 1983

The Butler Block is an historic mixed use residential and commercial building located at 166 Linwood Street, in Uxbridge, Massachusetts. This 2 1/2 brick and wood building was built c. 1845–55. Most of the building's walls are made of brick laid in common bond, but the upper level of the north facade is framed in wood. The property also includes a 19th-century barn. The building has relatively simple Greek Revival styling, including corners trimmed with pilasters.

On October 7, 1983, it was added to the National Register of Historic Places, where it is listed at 210 Linwood.

== See also ==
- National Register of Historic Places listings in Uxbridge, Massachusetts
