= N. Williams House =

Historic house in Massachusetts, United States

- U.S. National Register of Historic Places
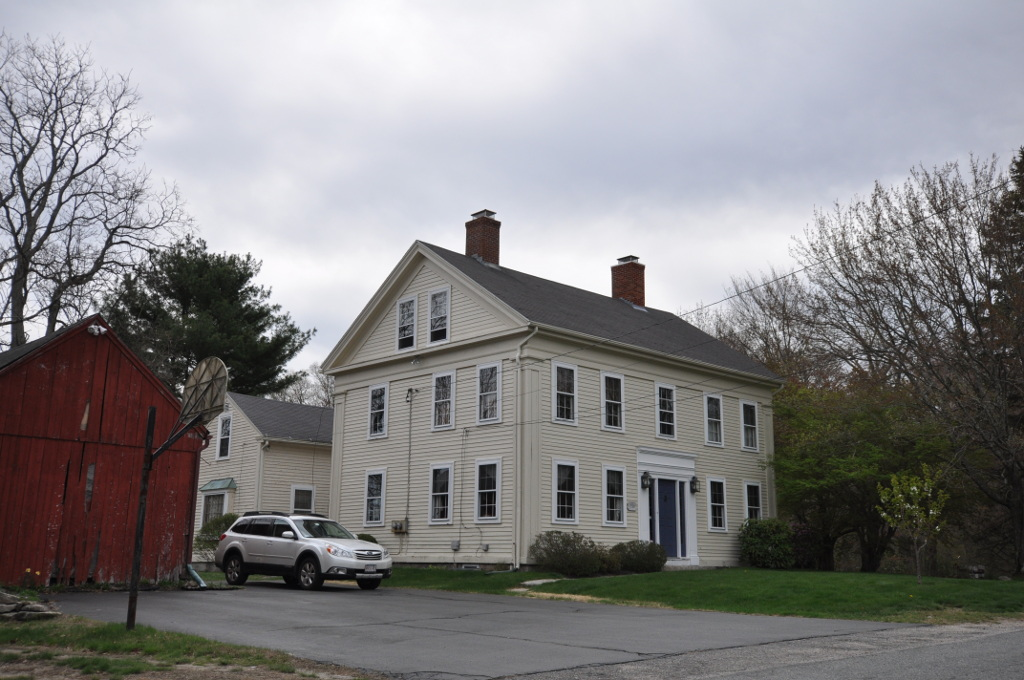

- Location within Massachusetts Location within the United States
- Location: 7 Rawson St., Uxbridge, Massachusetts
- Coordinates: 42°5′24″N 71°40′38″W
- Built: 1845
- Architectural style: Greek Revival
- MPS: Uxbridge MRA
- NRHP reference No.: 83004147
- Added to NRHP: October 7, 1983

The N. Williams House is an historic house at 7 Rawson Street (just northeast of its junction with Williams Street) in Uxbridge, Massachusetts. The 2 1/2 story wood-frame house was built c. 1845–55, and is one of Uxbridge's finest Greek Revival houses. It is five bays wide and four deep, with a pair of interior chimneys. It has corner pilasters supporting a full and wide cornice. Windows are set in moulded frames, the main entry is framed by sidelights, pilasters, and a cornice, and there are secondary entrances one the east elevation, one with sidelights and a transom window, the other with a transom window.

On October 7, 1983, it was added to the National Register of Historic Places.

== See also ==
- National Register of Historic Places listings in Uxbridge, Massachusetts
