= North Uxbridge School =

- U.S. National Register of Historic Places
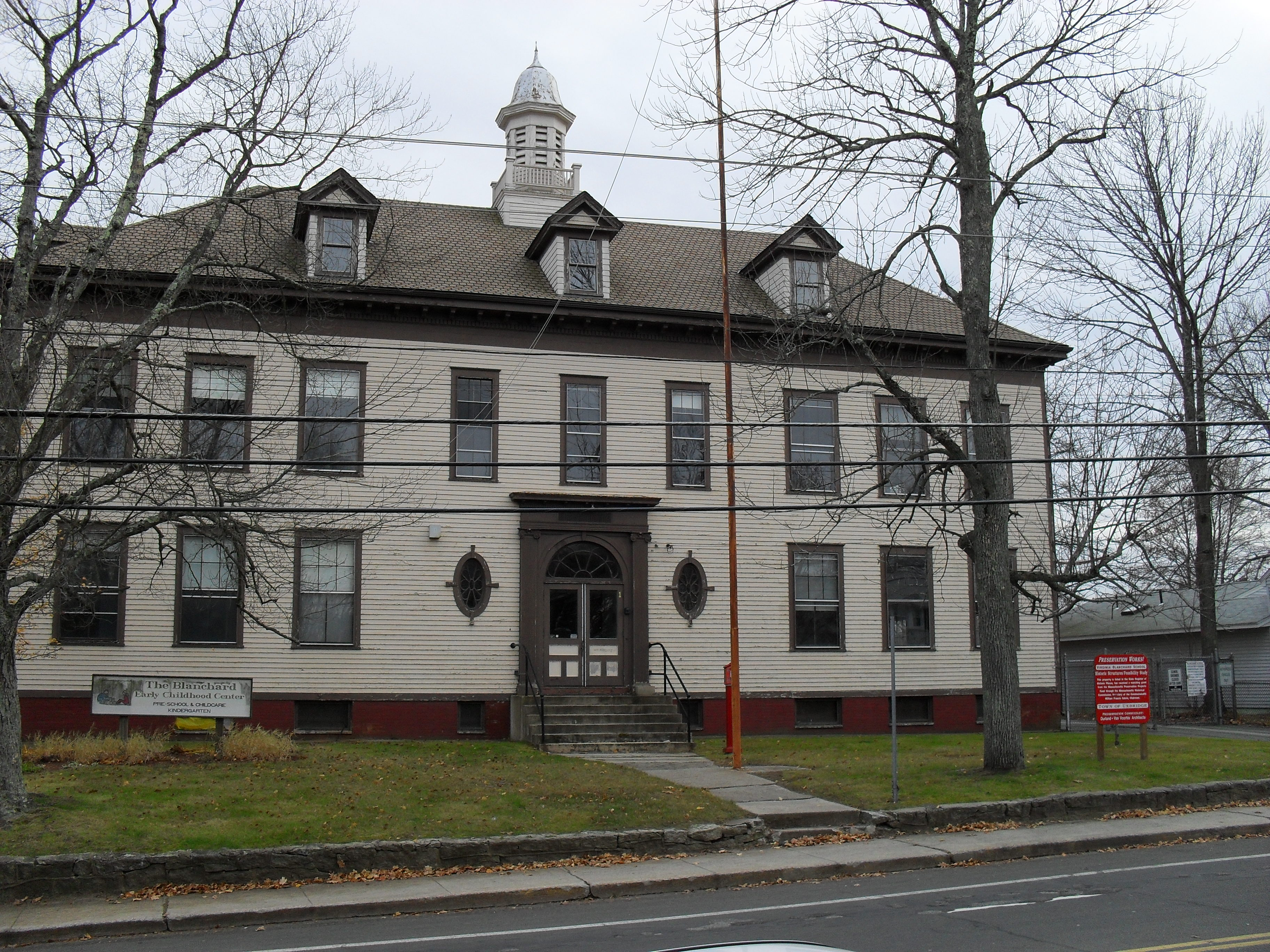

- Location within Massachusetts Location within the United States
- Location: Uxbridge, Massachusetts
- Coordinates: 42°05′32″N 71°38′19″W
- Built: 1872
- Architect: Cutting, Carlton & Cutting
- Architectural style: Colonial Revival, Italianate
- MPS: Uxbridge MRA
- NRHP reference No.: 83004127
- Added to NRHP: October 7, 1983

The North Uxbridge School, also known as the Virginia A. Blanchard School, is an historic school building at 87 East Hartford Avenue in Uxbridge, Massachusetts. Built in 1873 and enlarged in 1900, it served as a public school until 2002. It was listed on the National Register of Historic Places in 1983 for its architectural and community significance. It is slated in 2015 to be converted into affordable housing.

== Description and history ==
The former Blanchard School is located on the south side of Hartford Avenue East, between Boston and School Streets, a short way east of the center of Uxbridge. It is a large two-story wood frame structure, with a hip roof, clapboard siding, and granite foundation. The roof is capped by an octagonal cupola which is set on a square base with surrounding balustrade, and capped by a bell-shaped roof. The front facade, facing north, is nine bays wide, with sash windows in the outermost three bays on each side, and narrower sash windows on the second floor in the center three bays. The entrance is in the center bay on the ground floor, with flanking pilasters and an entablature above, and oval windows in the flanking bays. To the rear of this is the older (1873) portion of the school, also two stories in height, with a bracketed cornice and corner boards with arched panels.

The oldest portion of the school was built in 1873 on land donated by the Uxbridge Cotton Mill, and was the first of the town's district schools. This Italianiate building, which housed four classrooms, was enlarged in 1900 with the Colonial Revival structure now at the front. For many years it was named in honor of Virginia Blanchard, a longtime teacher and principal in the school system. When the school was closed in 2002, it was the oldest district school in the state in active service. The building was vacant until 2019, when it was converted into affordable housing.

== See also ==
- National Register of Historic Places listings in Uxbridge, Massachusetts
