= Charles Capron House =

Historic house in Massachusetts, United States

- U.S. National Register of Historic Places
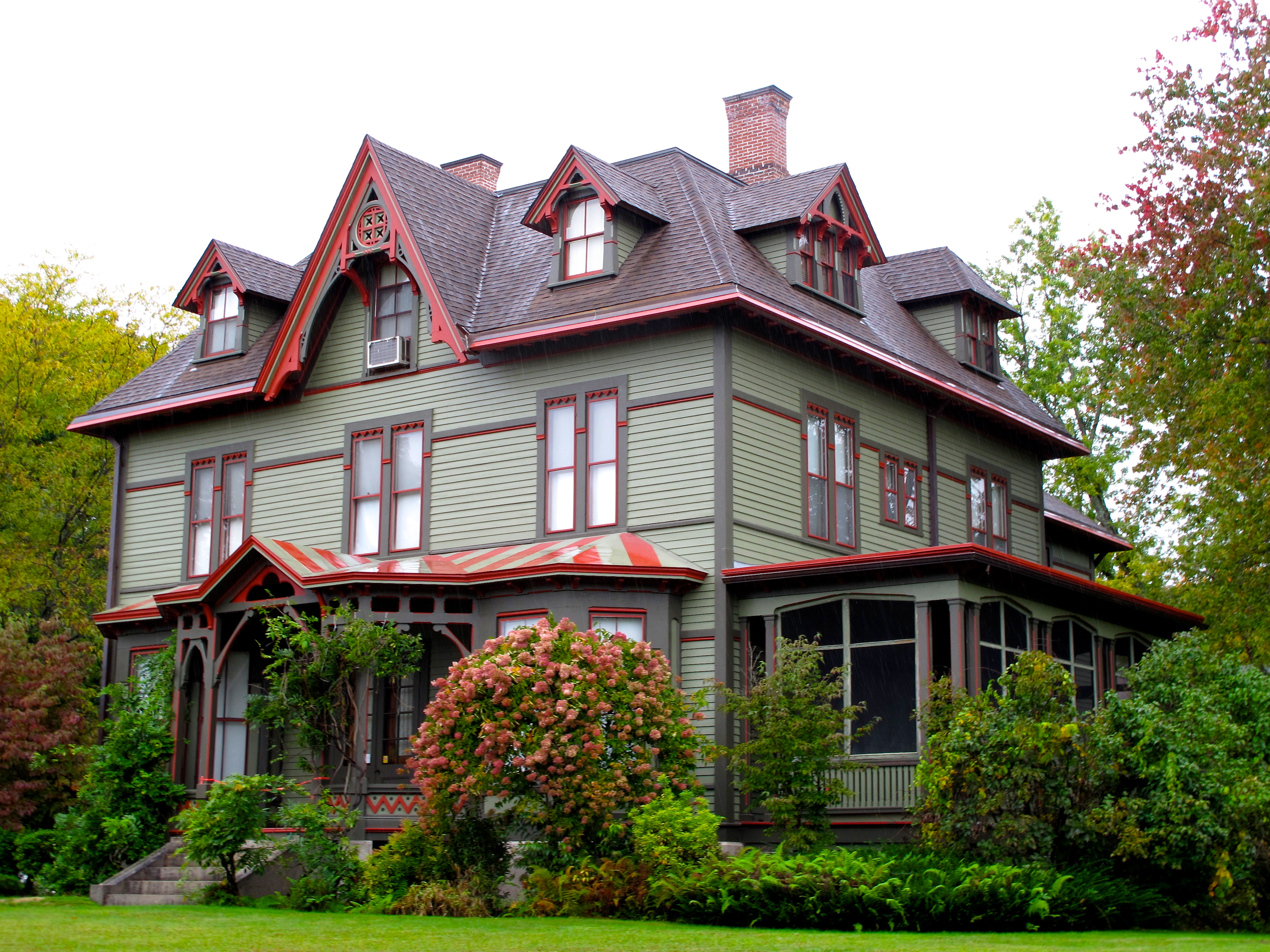

- Location within Massachusetts Location within the United States
- Location: Uxbridge, Massachusetts
- Coordinates: 42°4′40″N 71°37′39″W
- Built: 1874
- Architectural style: Gothic
- MPS: Uxbridge MRA
- NRHP reference No.: 83004111
- Added to NRHP: October 7, 1983

The Charles Capron House is an historic house at 2 Capron Street in Uxbridge, Massachusetts. Built in 1874, it is an locally distinguished example of Gothic Revival architecture. It is also notable for its association with Charles Capron, a local mill owner. The house was listed on the National Register of Historic Places in 1983.

== Description and history ==
The Capron House is prominently located at the corner of Capron and Mendon Streets (Massachusetts Route 16), a short way east of Uxbridge's downtown area. It is a 2 1/2-story wood-frame structure, with a mansard-style truncated hip roof, clapboard siding, and a granite foundation. Its main facade, facing southeast, is three bays wide, sheltered by a highly decorated open porch that joins the space between flanking polygonal window bays. A gable breaks the roof line above the entrance, and is decorated with Gothic woodwork, as are the dormers piercing the roof. Gothic details are continued on the flanking sides, and on the attached ell. The carriage barn at the rear of the property is a period structure; it is a two-story wood-frame structure, with a clipped gable roof topped by a cupola.

The house was built in 1874 by Charles Capron (which is for sale as of 10/2020), a member of the locally prominent Capron family who was one of the owners of the Capron Mill (no longer standing), and was responsible for the introduction of electricity into Uxbridge. Capron was also active in civic affairs, serving as town treasurer, town clerk, selectman, and as a state representative. The house is Uxbridge's finest example of Gothic Revival architecture.

== See also ==
- National Register of Historic Places listings in Uxbridge, Massachusetts
