= J. Kensley House =

Historic house in Massachusetts, United States

- U.S. National Register of Historic Places
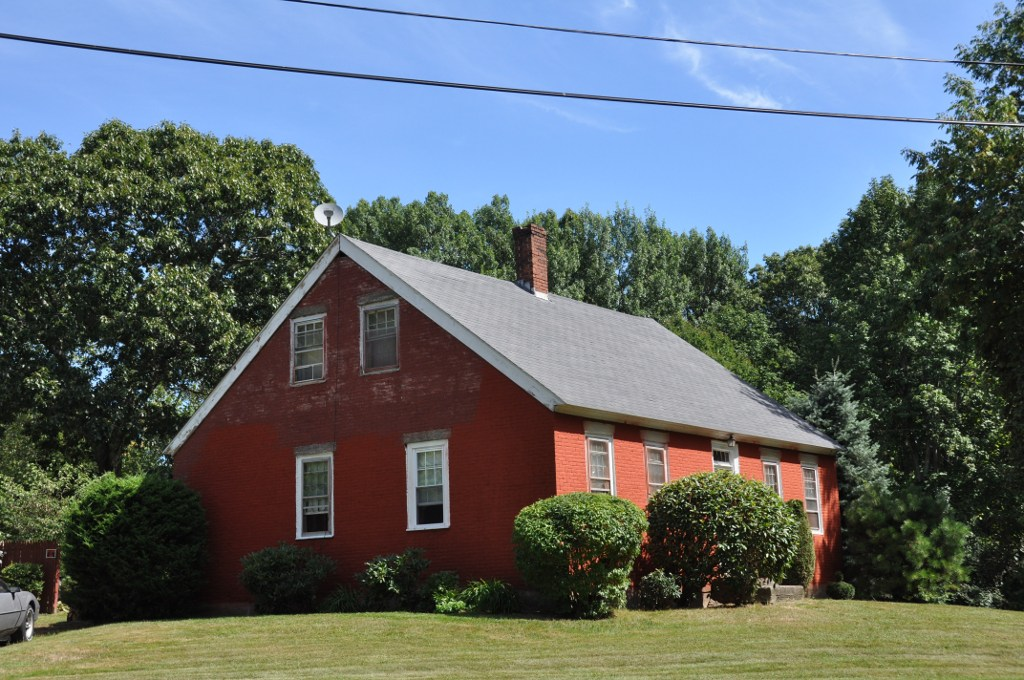

- Location within Massachusetts Location within the United States
- Location: Uxbridge, Massachusetts
- Coordinates: 42°1′41″N 71°37′32″W
- Built: 1820
- Architectural style: Federal
- MPS: Uxbridge MRA
- NRHP reference No.: 83004126
- Added to NRHP: October 7, 1983

The J. Kensley House is an historic house located at 342 Chestnut Street in Uxbridge, Massachusetts. The 1 1/5 story brick house was built c. 1820, and is an excellent local example of Federal styling. The house has a central chimney, and an asymmetrical facade, whose center entry retains its original door. The house remained in the Kensley family (under a variety of spellings) until the late 19th century.

On October 7, 1983, it was added to the National Register of Historic Places as the J. Kensely House.

== See also ==
- National Register of Historic Places listings in Uxbridge, Massachusetts
