= Farnum Block =

- U.S. National Register of Historic Places
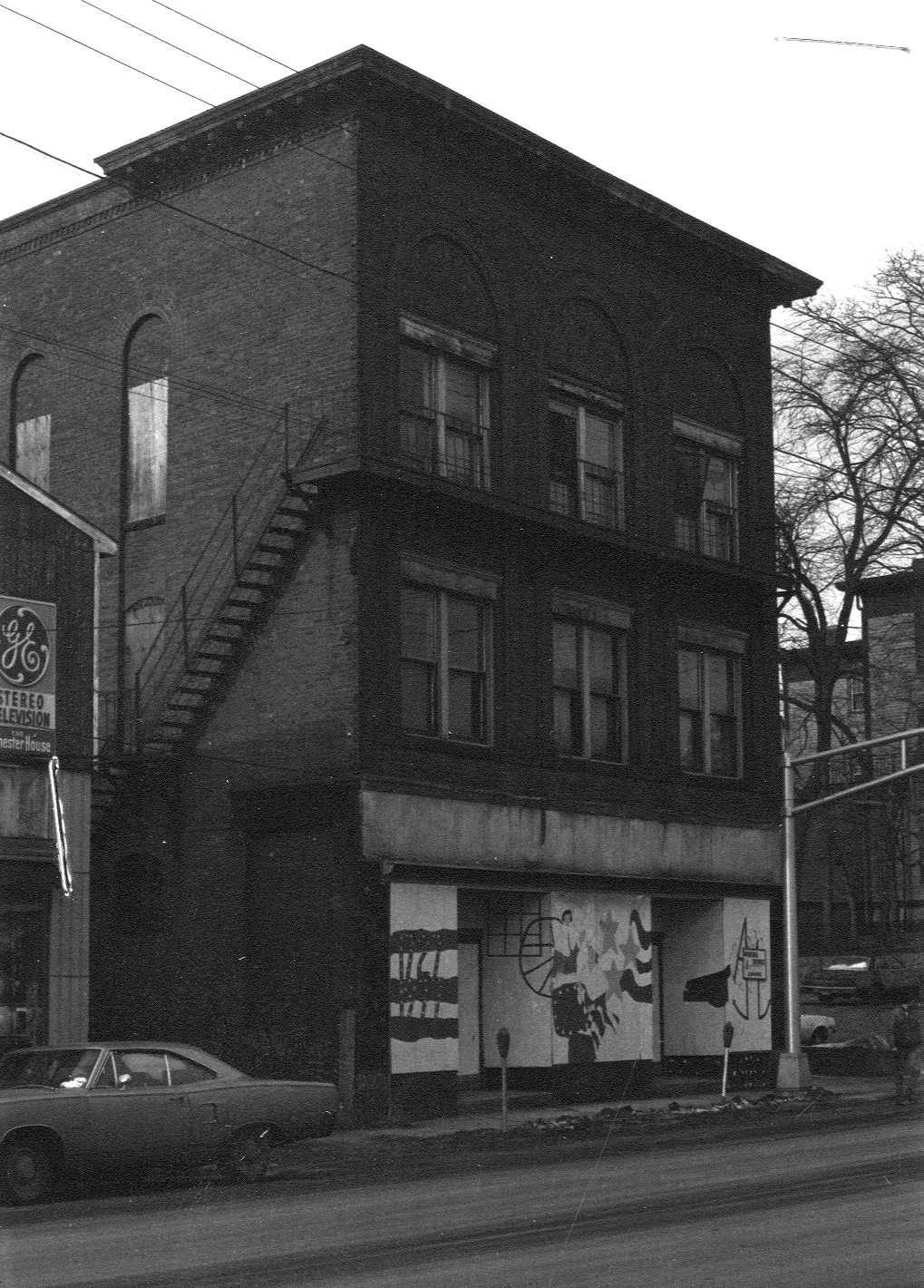

- Location within Massachusetts Location within the United States
- Location: 1 S. Main St., Uxbridge, Massachusetts
- Coordinates: 42°4′34″N 71°37′49″W
- Built: 1895
- Architectural style: Renaissance
- MPS: Uxbridge MRA
- NRHP reference No.: 83004117
- Added to NRHP: October 7, 1983

The Farnum Block was an historic commercial building located at 1 South Main Street, in Uxbridge, Massachusetts. It was a three-story brick building with Renaissance Revival styling, and was built sometime between 1895, when a fire destroyed commercial buildings in the area, and 1898. On October 7, 1983, it was added to the National Register of Historic Places. Sometime thereafter it was demolished.

== Description and history ==
The Farnum Block stood at the northern end of a short series of commercial blocks in the center of Uxbridge, on the west side of Main Street at its junction with Mendon Street. It was three stories in height, built of red brick in the Renaissance Revival style. The ground floor housed two commercial store fronts, topped by a metal cornice. The upper floors were divided vertically into three sections, defined by recessed arched panels, with paired sash windows at each level. Decorative pressed brick panels were set between the arched panels, and the building was crowned by a decorative metal cornice with modillions and egg-and-dart moulding. The side walls were more plainly finished.

The block was built about 1895, and was designed to house retail spaces on the ground floor, professional offices on the second, and an auditorium/meeting space on the third. This building plan was typical for commercial buildings of the period, as also seen in Uxbridge's Bank Building (destroyed by fire in 2013). Nothing is known of this building's first owner, H. S. Farnum.

== See also ==
- National Register of Historic Places listings in Uxbridge, Massachusetts
