= A. E. Cook House =

Historic house in Massachusetts, United States

- U.S. National Register of Historic Places
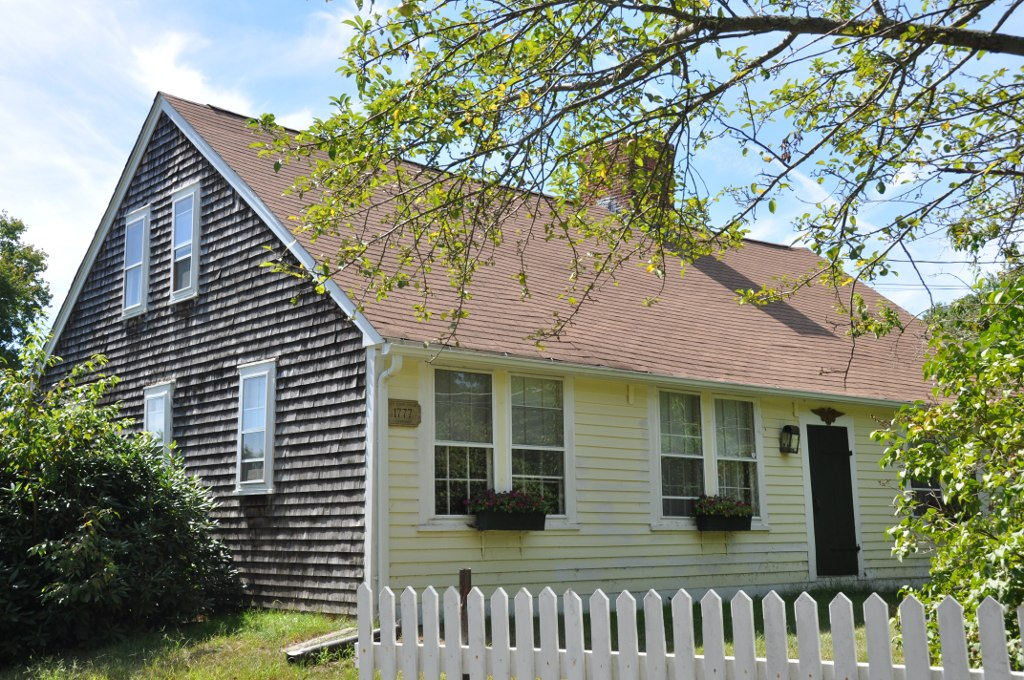

- Location within Massachusetts Location within the United States
- Location: 176 Aldrich Street, Uxbridge, Massachusetts
- Coordinates: 42°1′56″N 71°37′46″W
- Built: 1777
- Architectural style: Cape Cod
- MPS: Uxbridge MRA
- NRHP reference No.: 83004115
- Added to NRHP: October 7, 1983

The A. E. Cook House is an historic house at 176 Aldrich Street in Uxbridge, Massachusetts, United States. The construction date of this 1 1/2 story wood frame Cape Cod style house is not known; based on stylistic analysis, it may have been built as early as 1750, making it one of the older homes in South Uxbridge. All of its facades are asymmetrical in appearance; the main facade has a central door, with two windows on one side, and one on the other. The house's age is in part given by its massive central chimney.

On October 7, 1983, it was added to the National Register of Historic Places.

== See also ==
- National Register of Historic Places listings in Uxbridge, Massachusetts
