= George Carpenter House =

Historic house in Massachusetts, United States

- U.S. National Register of Historic Places
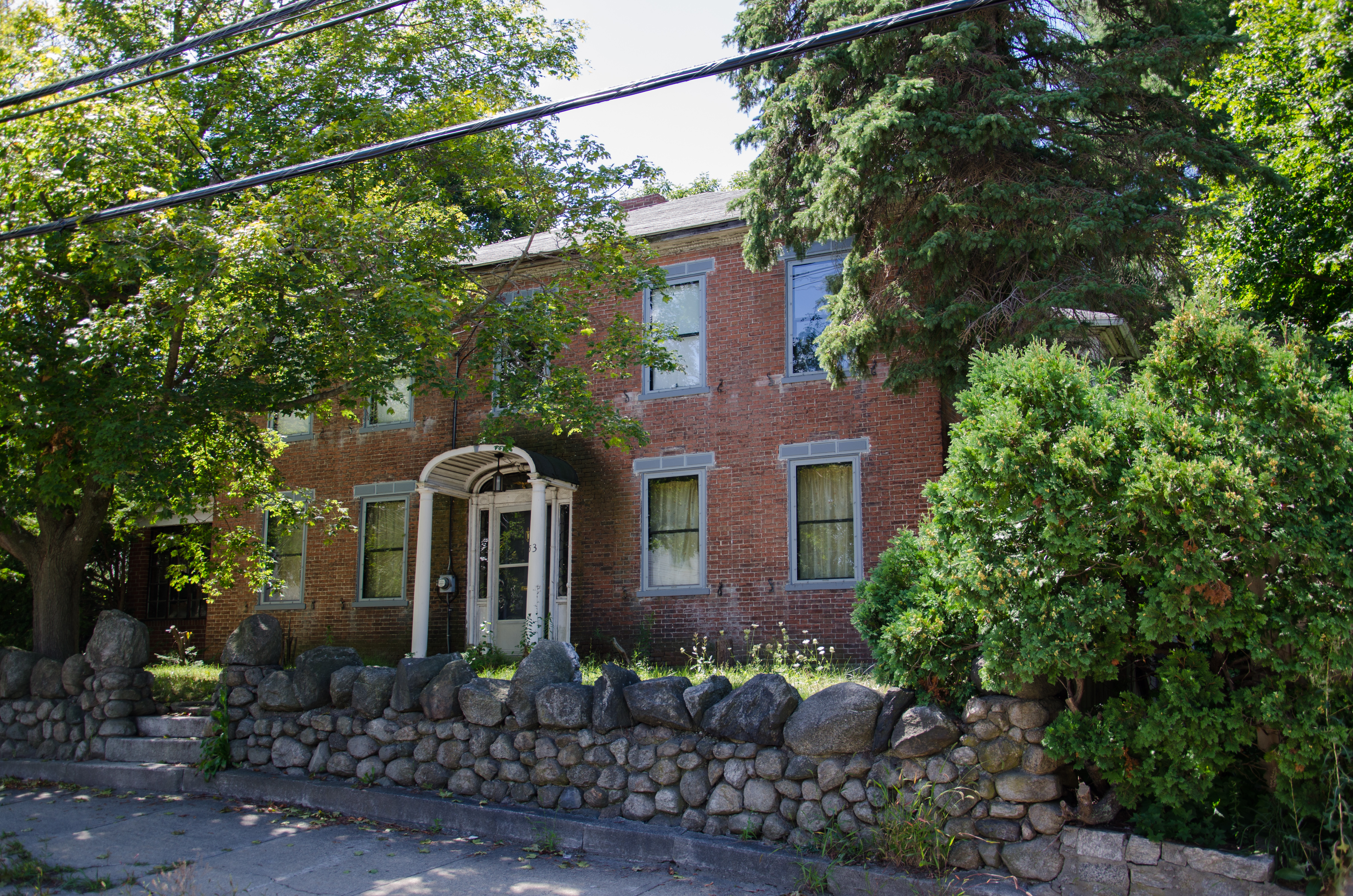

- Location within Massachusetts Location within the United States
- Location: Uxbridge, Massachusetts
- Coordinates: 42°4′25″N 71°37′42″W
- Built: 1815
- Architectural style: Federal
- MPS: Uxbridge MRA
- NRHP reference No.: 83004112
- Added to NRHP: October 7, 1983

The George Carpenter House is a historic house located at 53 South Main Street, in Uxbridge, Massachusetts. Built c. 1815–25, this two-story brick building is an excellent local example of high-style Federal architecture. The nearly square building has a hip roof with interior end wall chimneys. Its front entry is set beneath an elliptical arch supported by colonnettes. Its owner, George Carpenter, was a manufacturer of textile processing machinery.

On October 7, 1983, it was added to the National Register of Historic Places, where it is listed at 67 South Main.

== See also ==
- National Register of Historic Places listings in Uxbridge, Massachusetts
