= Taft Brothers Block =

- U.S. National Register of Historic Places
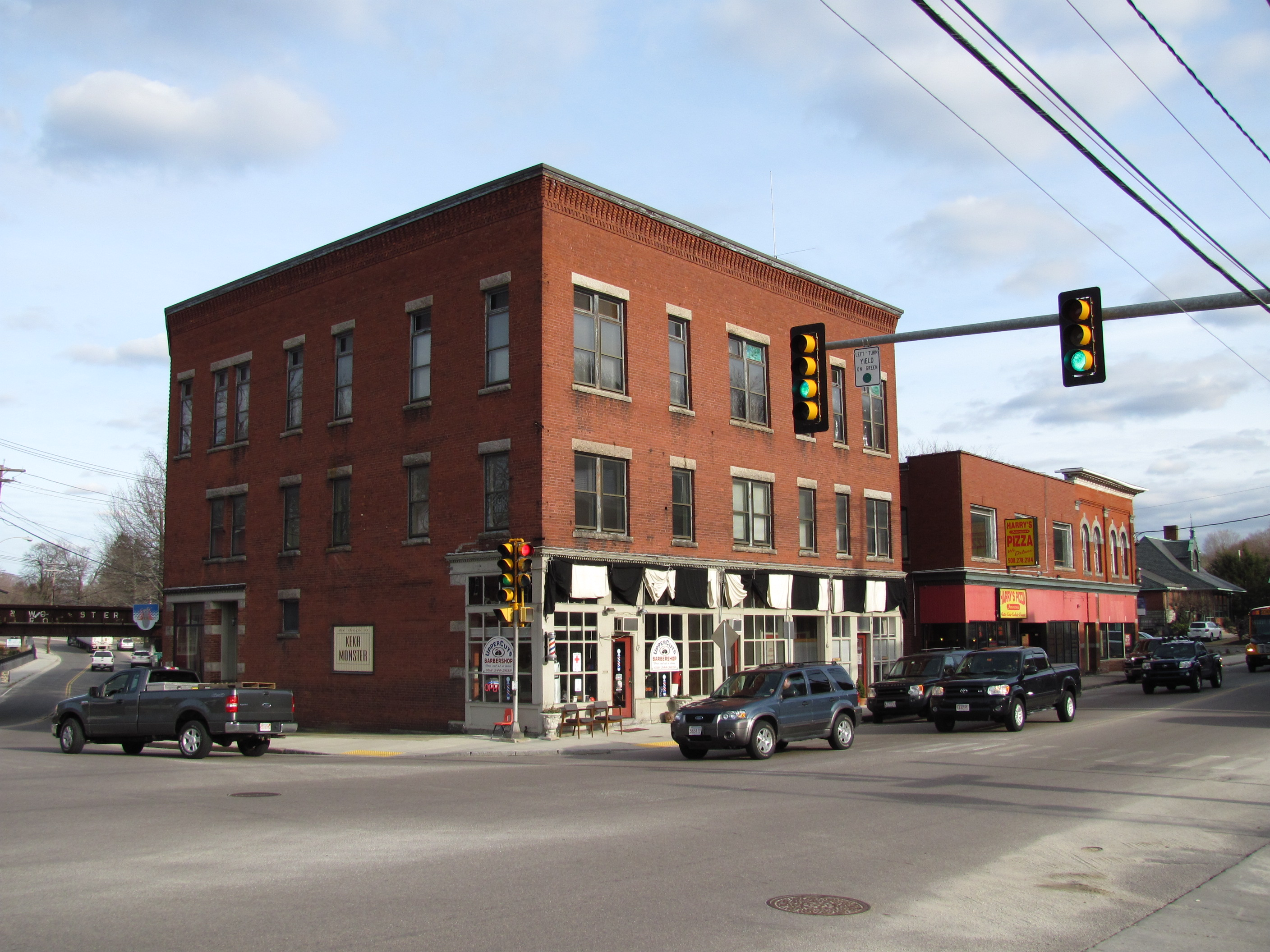

- Location within Massachusetts Location within the United States
- Location: 2-8 South Main St., Uxbridge, Massachusetts
- Coordinates: 42°4′34″N 71°37′47″W
- Built: 1902
- Architectural style: Late Victorian
- MPS: Uxbridge MRA
- NRHP reference No.: 83004137
- Added to NRHP: October 7, 1983

The Taft Brothers Block is an historic commercial building at 2-8 South Main Street, in Uxbridge, Massachusetts. Prominently located in the town center at the corner of Mendon and Main Streets, it is a three-story brick structure, with modest Late Victorian stylistic embellishments. Its first floor has commercial retail storefronts, while the upper-floor windows are set in openings with granite sills and lintels. Brick corbelling marks the cornice below the flat roof. The upper floor is taller than the other floors, and houses a large auditorium space. It was built in 1896 for Robert and Jacob Taft, operators of a grocery, after the previous building on the site was destroyed by fire.

On October 7, 1983, it was added to the National Register of Historic Places.

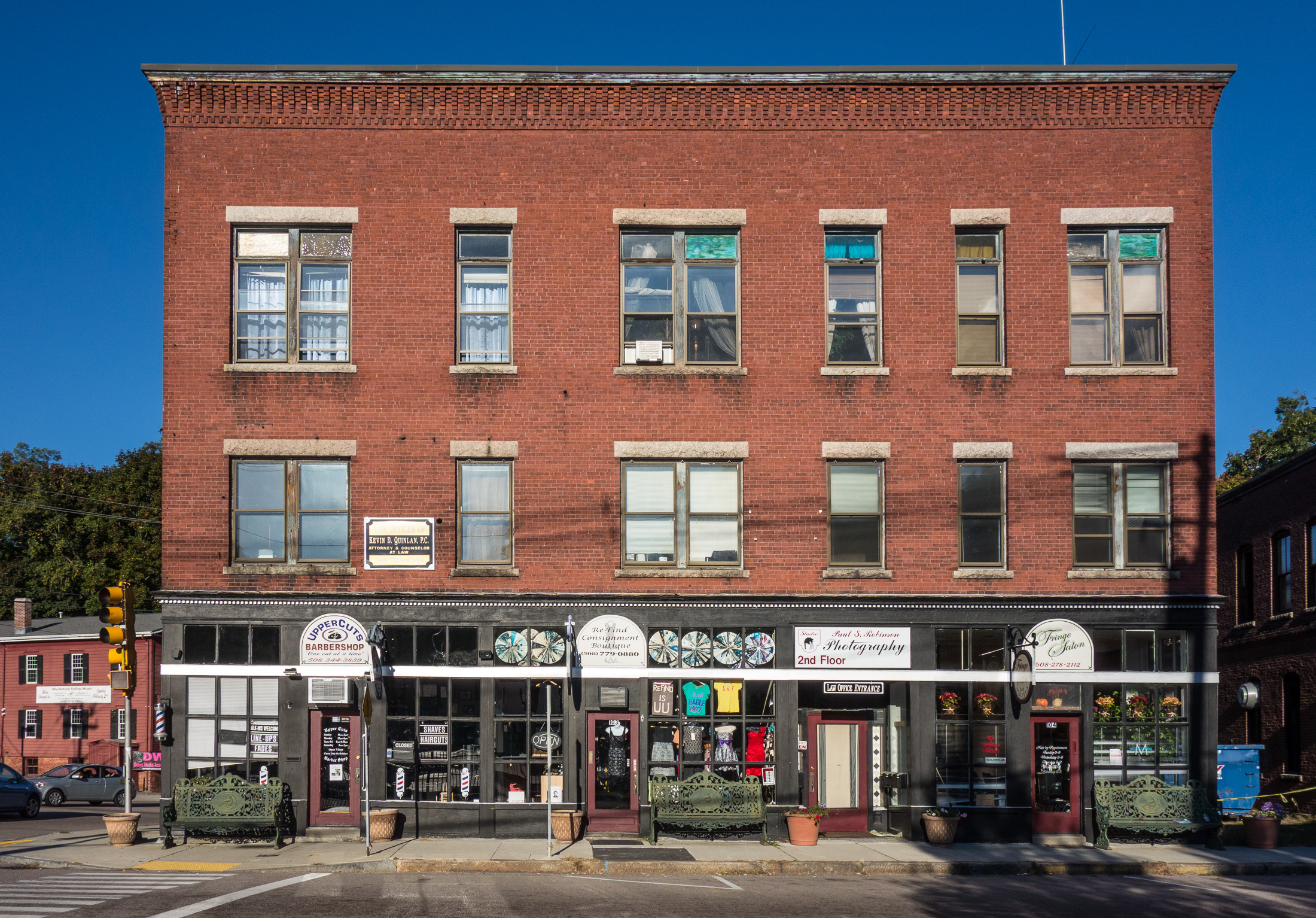
Front view

== See also ==
- National Register of Historic Places listings in Uxbridge, Massachusetts
