= A. Whipple House =

Historic house in Massachusetts, United States

- U.S. National Register of Historic Places
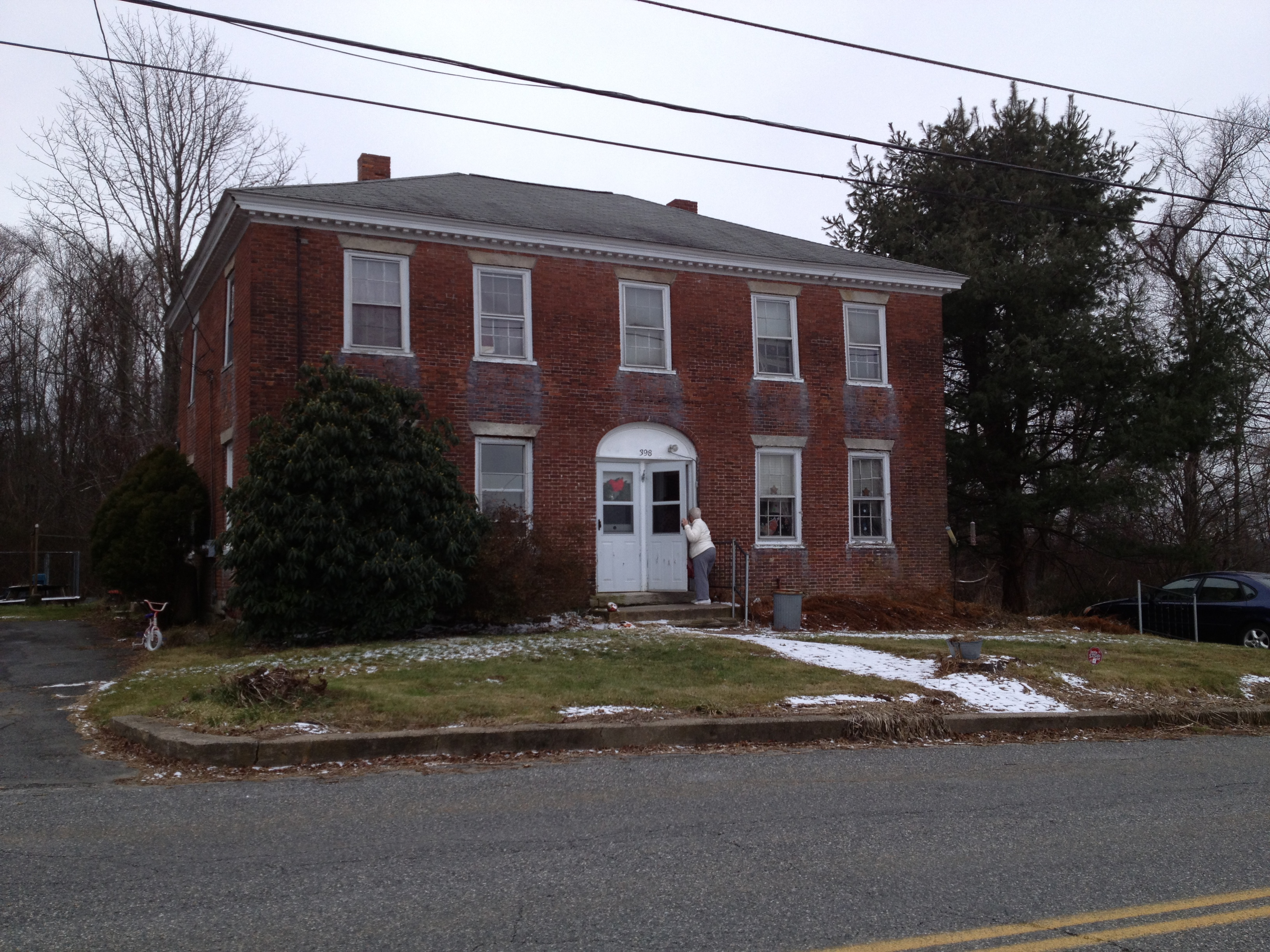

- Location within Massachusetts
- Location: Uxbridge, Massachusetts
- Coordinates: 42°5′54″N 71°40′35″W
- Built: 1815
- Architectural style: Federal
- MPS: Uxbridge MRA
- NRHP reference No.: 83004146
- Added to NRHP: October 7, 1983

The A. Whipple House is an historic house located at 398 Sutton Street in Uxbridge, Massachusetts.

== Description and history ==
The two story brick house was built c. 1815–1825, and is an excellent local example of Federal style architecture. The brick on the main facade is laid in Flemish bond, and in common bond on the other three sides. The main facade is a typical five bays wide, with a center entry. The entry originally had a fanlight window above, but has been rebuilt to have two doors, and the fanlight has been blocked up.

On October 7, 1983, it was added to the National Register of Historic Places.

== See also ==
- National Register of Historic Places listings in Uxbridge, Massachusetts
