= Dexter Richardson House =

Historic house in Massachusetts, United States

- U.S. National Register of Historic Places
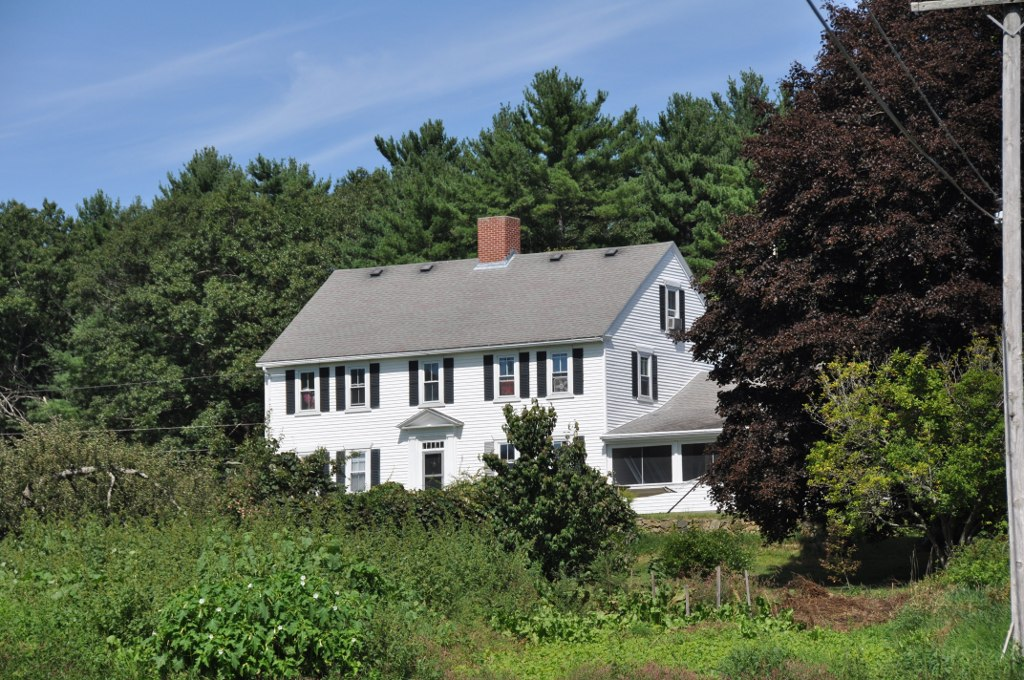

- Location within Massachusetts Location within the United States
- Location: Uxbridge, Massachusetts
- Coordinates: 42°1′29″N 71°36′52″W
- Built: 1736
- Architectural style: Georgian
- MPS: Uxbridge MRA
- NRHP reference No.: 83004128
- Added to NRHP: October 7, 1983

The Dexter Richardson House is an historic house at 5 South Street in Uxbridge, Massachusetts. The 2 1/2 story wood-frame house was built c. 1736, and is a well-preserved local example of transitional Georgian-Federal styling. The basic massing of the main block is Georgian, with five bays and a central entry, with a large central chimney. The entry is framed by Federal style fluted pilasters and topped by a heavy pediment; there is a five-light transom window above the door.

On October 7, 1983, it was added to the National Register of Historic Places.

== See also ==
- National Register of Historic Places listings in Uxbridge, Massachusetts
