= Granite Store (Uxbridge, Massachusetts) =

- U.S. National Register of Historic Places
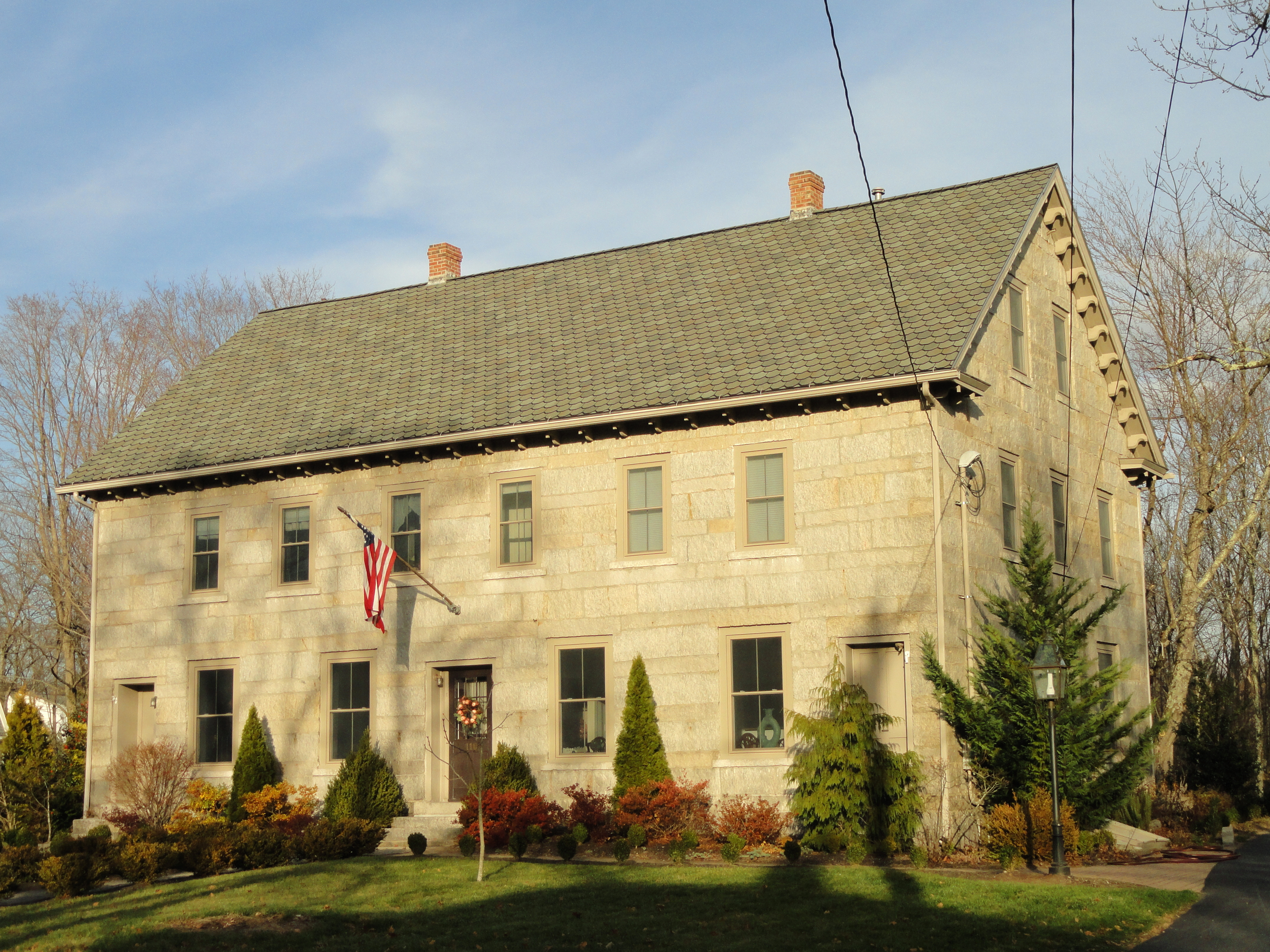

- Location within Massachusetts Location within the United States
- Location: 110 Hecla Street, Uxbridge, Massachusetts
- Coordinates: 42°4′28″N 71°36′47″W
- Built: 1850
- MPS: Uxbridge MRA
- NRHP reference No.: 83004120
- Added to NRHP: October 7, 1983

The Granite Store is a historic building located at 110 Hecla Street, in Uxbridge, Massachusetts.

== Description and history ==
This 2 1/2 story granite building was constructed c. 1850–60, and may have been built by the Spaulding Company, who owned the nearby mill complex. It is distinctive locally as a granite structure in a residential area of predominantly wood-frame houses, and for its uses as a company store and meeting space (above). The building has since been converted to residential use.

It was added to the National Register of Historic Places on October 7, 1983.

== See also ==
- National Register of Historic Places listings in Uxbridge, Massachusetts
