= C.R. Thomson House and Barn =

Historic house in Massachusetts, United States

- Comfort R. Thomson Barn and Phineas Wood House
- U.S. National Register of Historic Places
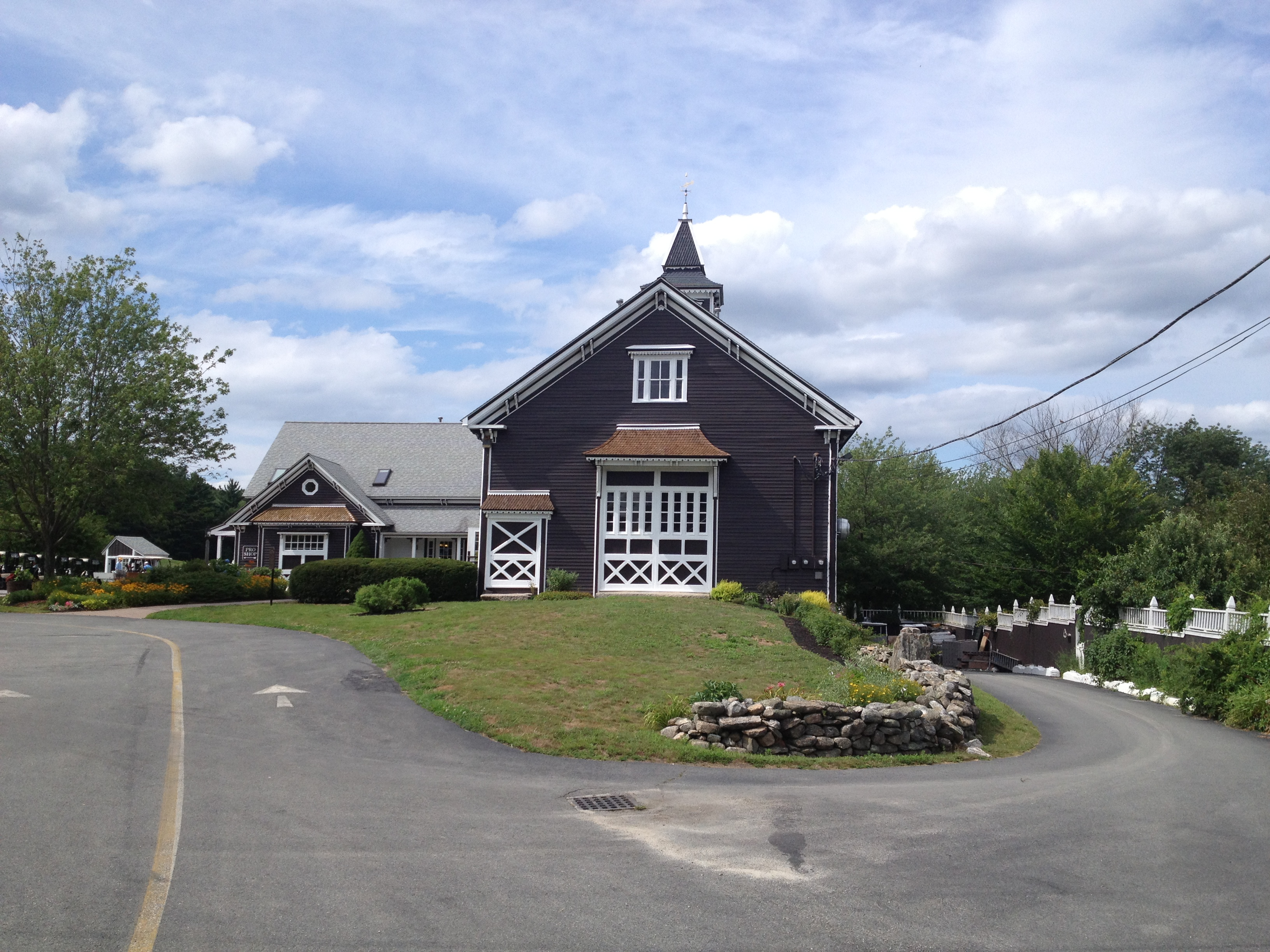

- Location within Massachusetts Location within the United States
- Location: Uxbridge, Massachusetts
- Coordinates: 42°1′57″N 71°40′47″W
- Built: 1881
- Architectural style: Late Victorian
- MPS: Uxbridge MRA
- NRHP reference No.: 83004142
- Added to NRHP: October 7, 1983

The C.R. Thomson Barn and the Phineas Wood House are historic buildings at 795 Chockalog Street in Uxbridge, Massachusetts. The house is a modest 1 1/2 story timber-frame cottage estimated built in 1745 by Phineas Wood. It is predominantly vernacular in its styling, except for a c. 1870s Victorian entry, likely added by C.R. Thompson. The barn on the property dates to the 1881, and has some elaborate Gothic styling, including bracketed cornices, and bargeboard decoration around its entrances. The property was associated at that time with Comfort R. Thomson, a breeder of show cattle.

On October 7, 1983, they were added to the National Register of Historic Places.

== See also ==
- National Register of Historic Places listings in Uxbridge, Massachusetts
