= Daniel Aldrich Cottage and Sawmill =

Historic house in Massachusetts, United States

- U.S. National Register of Historic Places
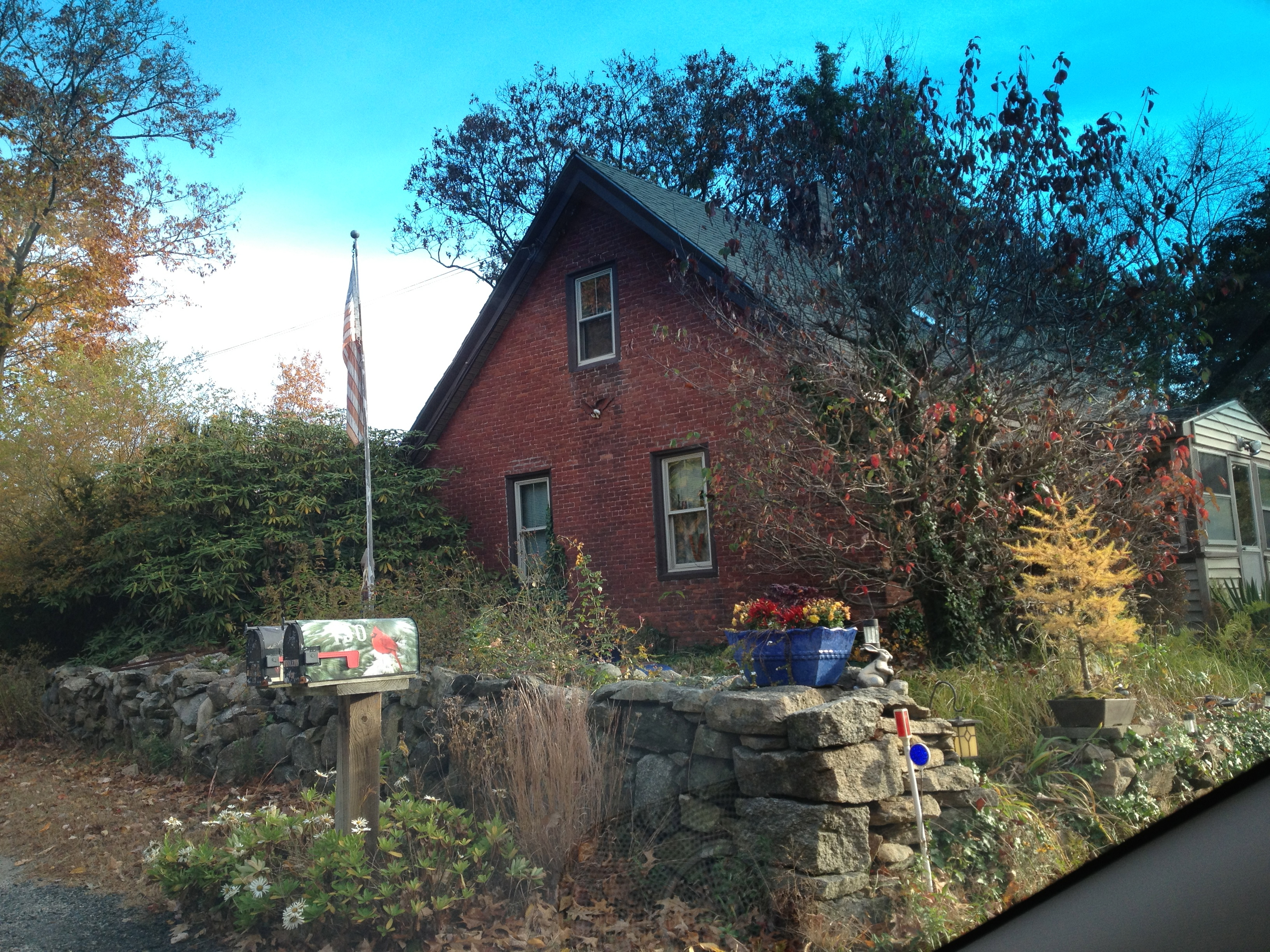

- Location within Massachusetts Location within the United States
- Location: 364 Aldrich St., Uxbridge, Massachusetts
- Coordinates: 42°1′39″N 71°38′27″W
- Area: 10.5 acres (4.2 ha)
- Built: 1830; 196 years ago
- Architectural style: Federal
- MPS: Uxbridge MRA
- NRHP reference No.: 83004103
- Added to NRHP: October 7, 1983

The Daniel Aldrich Cottage and Sawmill is a historic property at 364 Aldrich Street in Uxbridge, Massachusetts. It includes a c. 1790s late Federal style brick cottage, and at one time also included a rare surviving small-scale sawmill, built around 1790s. They were built by Daniel Aldrich, member of a locally prominent family, were listed on the National Register of Historic Places in 1983.

== Description and history ==
The Daniel Aldrich property is located on the south side of Aldrich Street in a rural area of central southern Uxbridge. The house is a 1 1/2-story brick structure, with a side gable roof and end chimneys. The front facade is laid in stretcher bond, while the other sides are laid in common bond. The front has five bays, with a center entrance flanked by sidelight windows. A wood-frame Greek Revival ell extends to the east. Located southwest of the house is a barn.

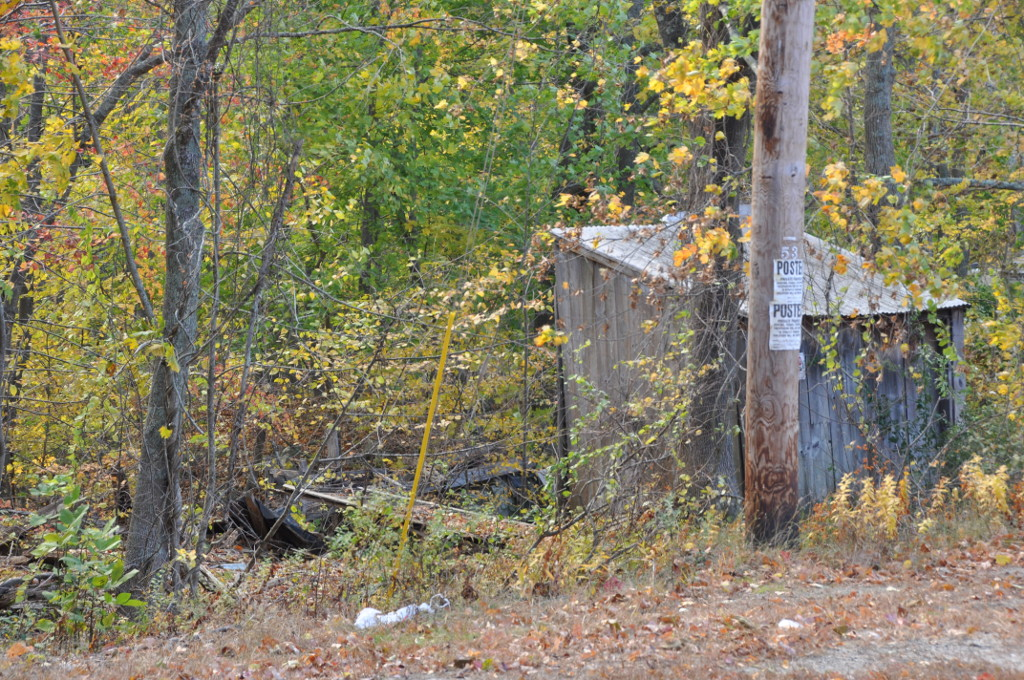
What is left of the mill in 2015

East of the house, across a small brook, stood a modest single-story wood-frame structure with a gable roof and clapboard siding. Possibly dating to about the same period as the house, it was a rare surviving example of a small 19th-century sawmill. Most of the building has been demolished since it was listed on the National Register.

Beginning in the 1820s, Aldrich Village developed as a community of the extended family of the Aldriches. The Aldrich family were Quakers and their community included their homes and businesses they operated. This property was owned by Daniel Aldrich, who ran a saw mill, a blacksmith shop and a wheelwright shop which produced numerous products such as roof shingles, wagons, lumber. The property was later taken over by Daniel's son Gideon, but it is not clear if he used the mill in his lumber-related businesses.

== See also ==
- National Register of Historic Places listings in Uxbridge, Massachusetts
