= Judson–Taft House =

Historic house in Massachusetts, United States

- U.S. National Register of Historic Places
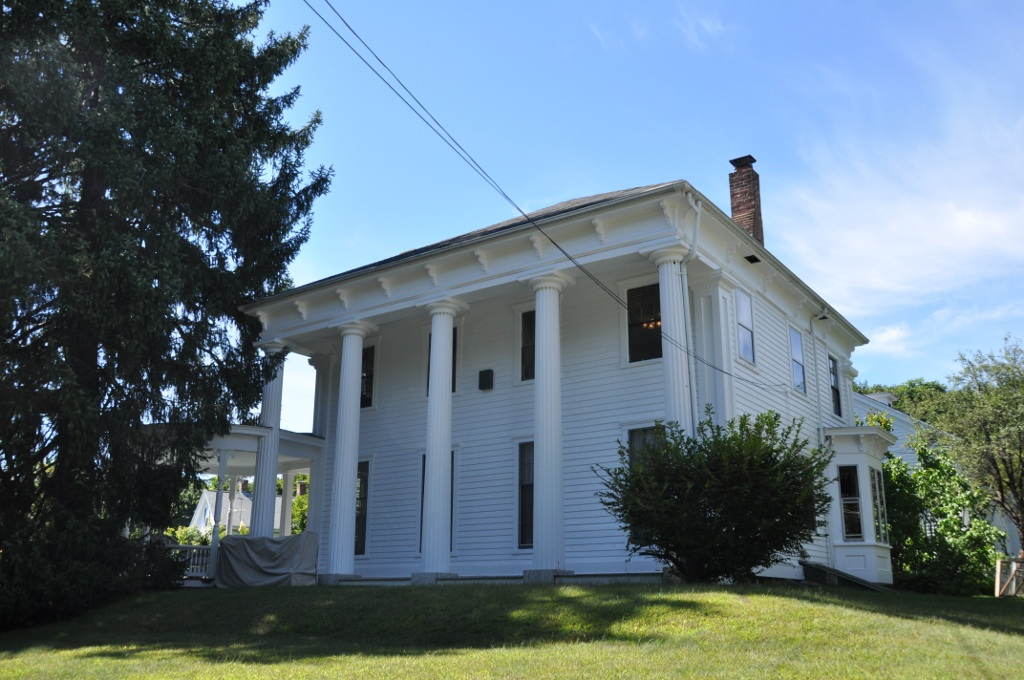
- Judson Taft House in 2013

- Location within Massachusetts Location within the United States
- Location: Uxbridge, Massachusetts
- Coordinates: 42°4′29″N 71°37′49″W
- Built: 1845
- Architectural style: Greek Revival
- MPS: Uxbridge MRA
- NRHP reference No.: 83004125
- Added to NRHP: October 7, 1983

The Judson–Taft House is a historic house located at 46 Pleasant Street, in Uxbridge, Massachusetts. The 2 1/2 story wood-frame house was built c. 1845–55, and is one of Uxbridge's most elaborate examples of high style Greek Revival design. The house occupies a site overlooking the center of Uxbridge, and its front yard originally extended all the way to Main Street. Its full two-story portico is supported by Doric columns, and its corner boards are pilastered.

On October 7, 1983, it was added to the National Register of Historic Places, where it is listed at 30 Pleasant.

== See also ==
- National Register of Historic Places listings in Uxbridge, Massachusetts
