= Israel Southwick House =

Historic house in Massachusetts, United States

- U.S. National Register of Historic Places
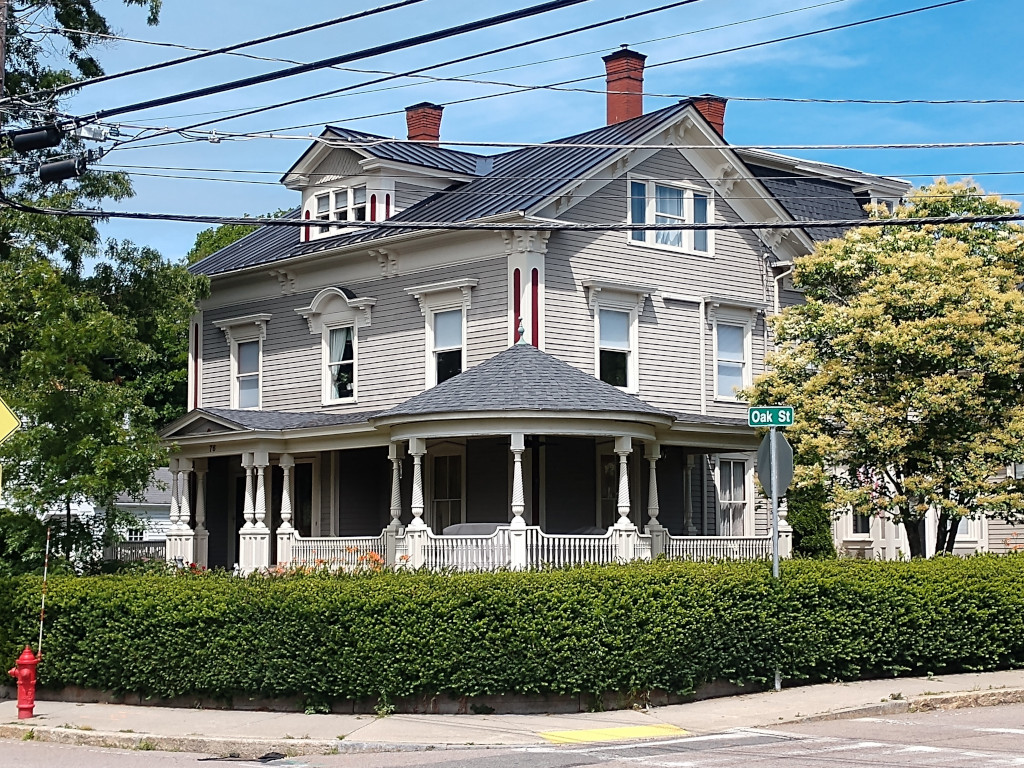

- Location within Massachusetts Location within the United States
- Location: 76 Mendon St., Uxbridge, Massachusetts
- Coordinates: 42°4′42″N 71°37′33″W
- Built: 1860
- Architectural style: Italianate, Queen Anne
- MPS: Uxbridge MRA
- NRHP reference No.: 83004133
- Added to NRHP: October 7, 1983

The Israel Southwick House is an historic house located at 76 Mendon Street (at its northwest corner with Oak Street), in Uxbridge, Massachusetts. The 2 1/2 story wood-frame house was built c. 1860–65, and is a good local example of Italianate styling, with Queen Anne elements added c. 1890. The main facade is three bays, with a center entry that has an elaborate colonnaded porch with a gable front roof. Above the entry is a Palladian window with a small half-round window surmounting the central of three relatively narrow windows. There is a gable-roof dormer with three windows above. To the left of the entry is a single story porch that has been enclosed, and a rounded corner porch extends to the right of the entry.

On October 7, 1983, it was added to the National Register of Historic Places, where it is listed at 70 Mendon Street.

== See also ==
- National Register of Historic Places listings in Uxbridge, Massachusetts
