= S. A. Hall House =

Historic house in Massachusetts, United States

- S.A. Hall House
- U.S. National Register of Historic Places
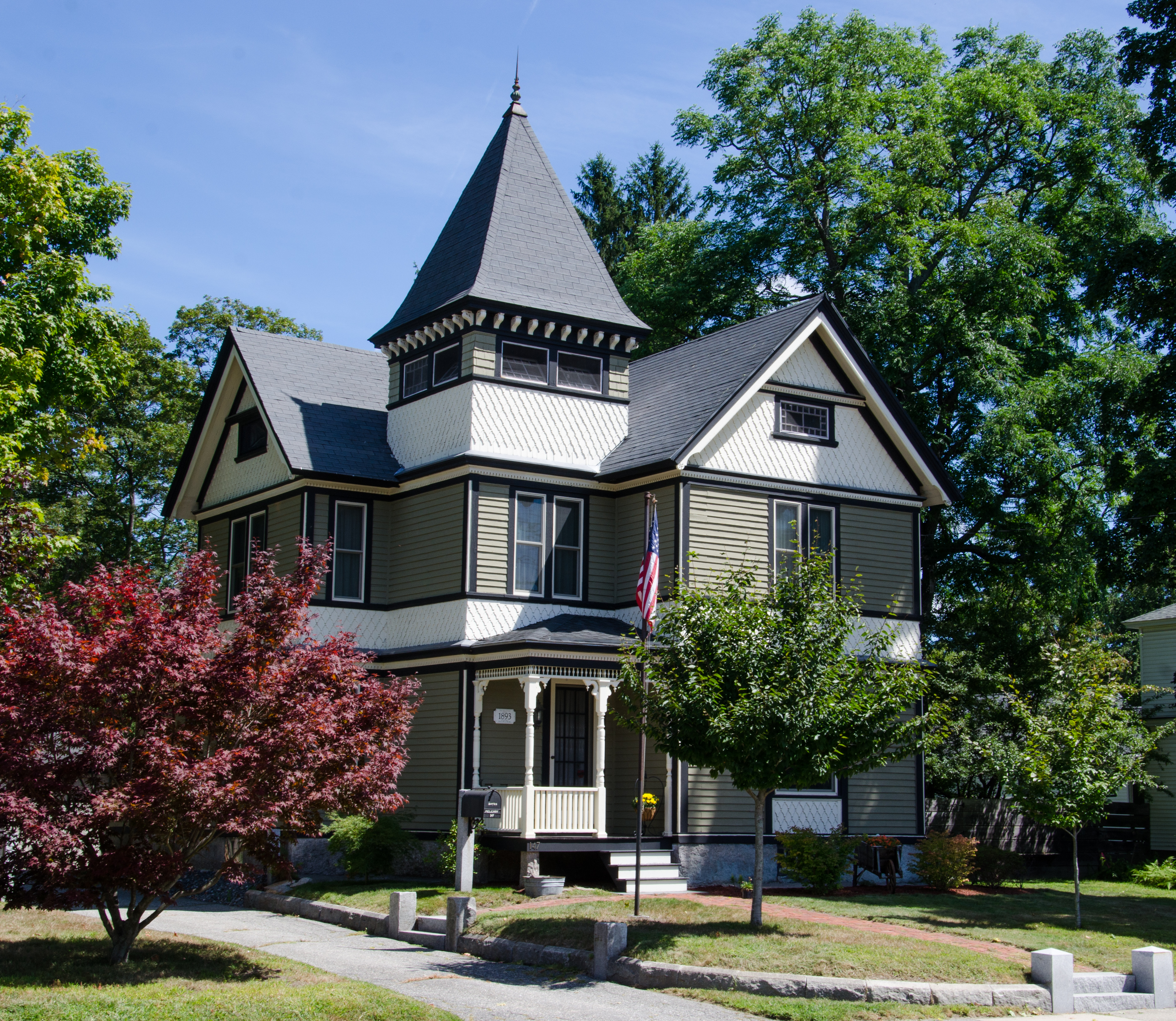

- Location within Massachusetts Location within the United States
- Location: Uxbridge, Massachusetts
- Coordinates: 42°4′54″N 71°38′16″W
- Built: 1890
- Architectural style: Queen Anne
- MPS: Uxbridge MRA
- NRHP reference No.: 83004121
- Added to NRHP: October 7, 1983

The S.A. Hall House is an historic house located at 147 North Main Street in Uxbridge, Massachusetts. It is a 2 1/2 story wood-frame structure, with a cross-gable roof, clapboard and wood shingle siding, and a granite foundation. A three-story square tower stands in a crook at the front of the house, topper by a pyramidal roof with a flared edge and bracketed eave. It has decorative cut shingle work in the gables and in bands between the levels. Its front porch, set in front of the tower, has a decorative bracketed frieze and turned posts. Built c. 1890, it is one of Uxbridge's finest Queen Anne houses. Its first documented owner (in 1898) was S. Alonzo Hall, publisher of the Uxbridge Compendium.

On October 7, 1983, it was added to the National Register of Historic Places.

== See also ==
- National Register of Historic Places listings in Uxbridge, Massachusetts
