= E. Albee House =

Historic house in Massachusetts, United States

- U.S. National Register of Historic Places
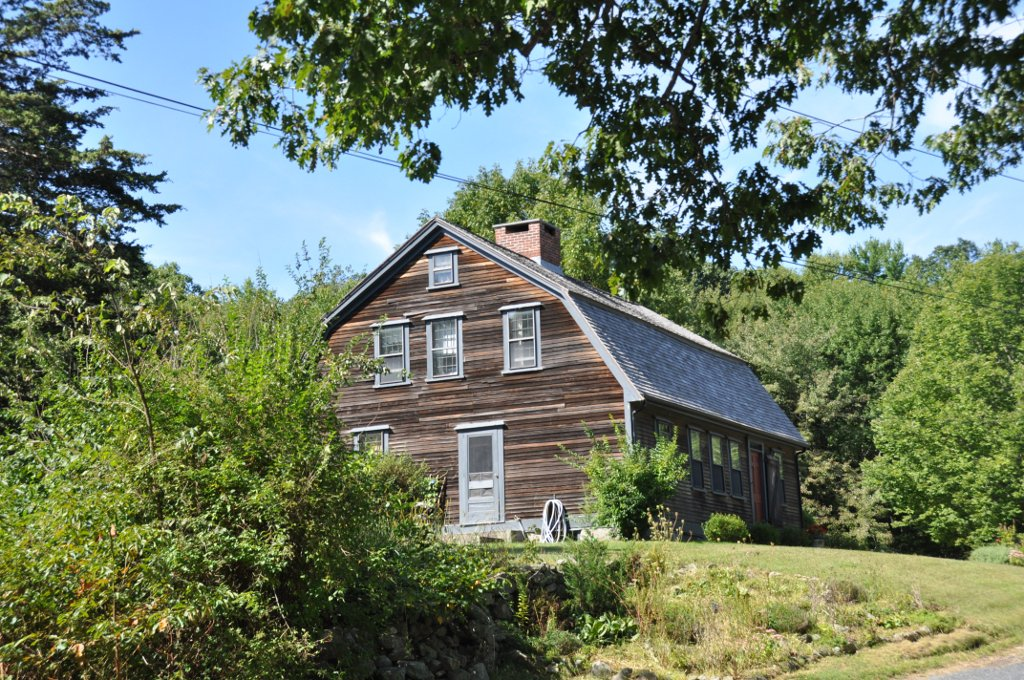

- Location within Massachusetts Location within the United States
- Location: Uxbridge, Massachusetts
- Coordinates: 42°4′7″N 71°35′42″W
- Area: less than one acre
- Built: c. 1750
- MPS: Uxbridge MRA
- NRHP reference No.: 83004102
- Added to NRHP: October 7, 1983

The E. Albee House is an historic house located at 217 Chapin Street, in Uxbridge, Massachusetts. Probably built in the mid-18th century, it is a well-preserved example of rural vernacular period architecture. On October 7, 1983, it was added to the National Register of Historic Places.

== Description and history ==
The E. Albee House stands in a rural area of eastern Uxbridge, on the south side of Chapin Street not far west of the town line with Mendon. It is a 2 1/2-story wood-frame structure, with a gambrel roof extending down to the first floor, brick central chimney, granite foundation, and clapboarded exterior. The north-facing front facade is five bays wide, with the entrance set in the bay right of center, and the windows otherwise placed somewhat asymmetrically. It is likely that the original main facade is that facing south. An early 19th-century barn stands across the street to the north.

The construction date of the house is unknown, but is believed to be mid-18th century, based on the similarity of its construction methods and details to other local houses that survive from that period, including the Samuel Taft House and the Coronet John Farnum Jr. House. It is possible that the 1855 owner of the property, E. Albee, was related to 17th century settlers of Mendon.

== See also ==
- National Register of Historic Places listings in Uxbridge, Massachusetts
