= William Hayward House =

Historic house in Massachusetts, United States

- U.S. National Register of Historic Places
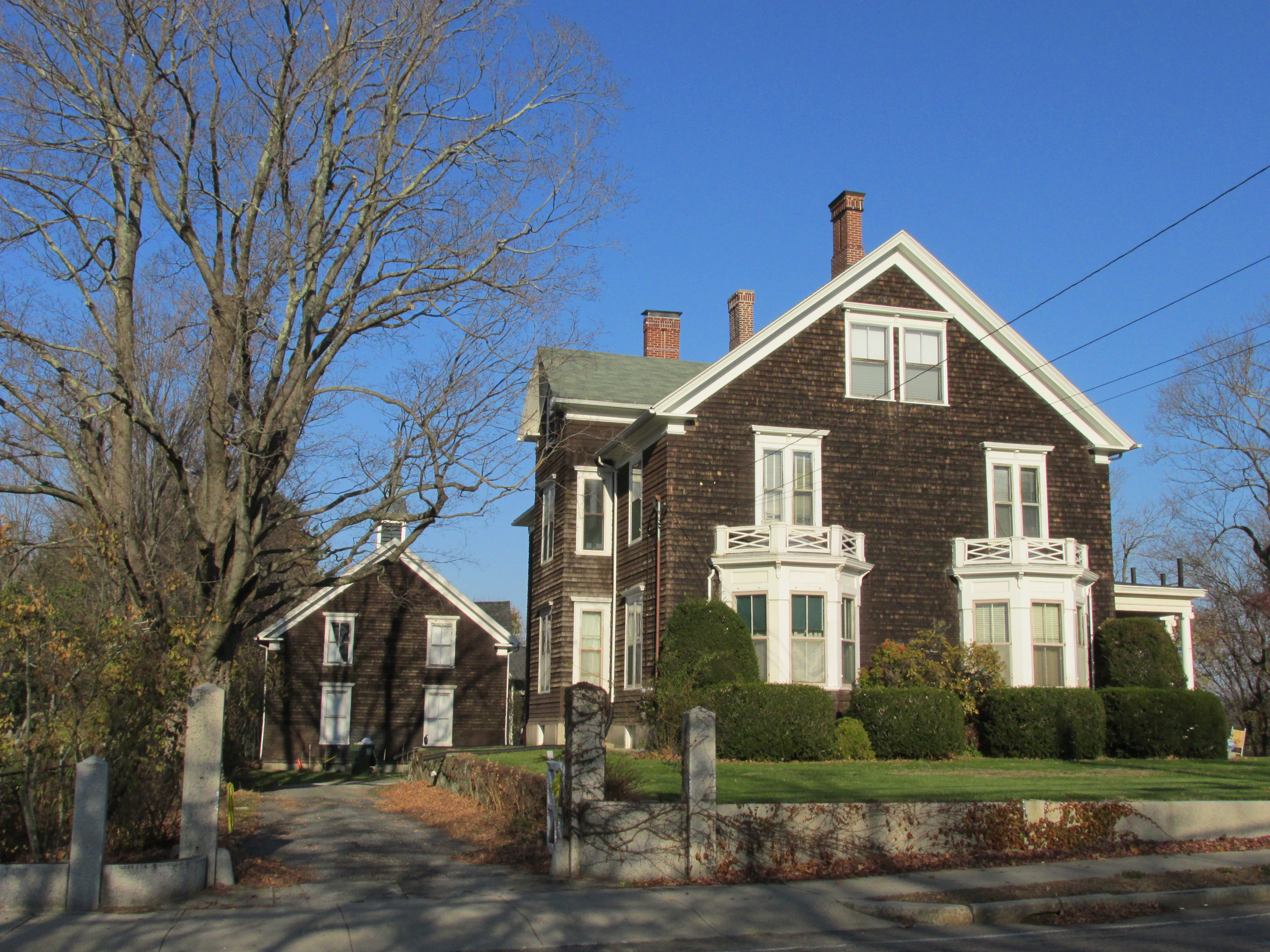
- 77 North Main Street

- Location within Massachusetts Location within the United States
- Location: Uxbridge, Massachusetts
- Coordinates: 42°4′48″N 71°38′2″W
- Built: 1875 - 1876
- Architect: i.southwick bilder (sic.) chc.painter apr.10,1876
- Architectural style: Italianate
- MPS: Uxbridge MRA
- NRHP reference No.: 83004122
- Added to NRHP: October 7, 1983

The William Hayward House is an historic house located at 77 North Main Street, in Uxbridge, Massachusetts. This 2 1/2 story wood-frame house was built in 1876 for William Hayward, a banker and business partner of the locally prominent mill owner Moses Taft. The house is an excellent local example of Italianate styling, although its elaborate porch is a later c. 1900 modification. The property also has a period carriage house in good condition and has been occupied by the George and Louise Kurzon family for 100 years.

On October 7, 1983, it was added to the National Register of Historic Places.

== See also ==
- National Register of Historic Places listings in Uxbridge, Massachusetts
