= Sylvanus Holbrook House =

Historic house in Massachusetts, United States

- U.S. National Register of Historic Places
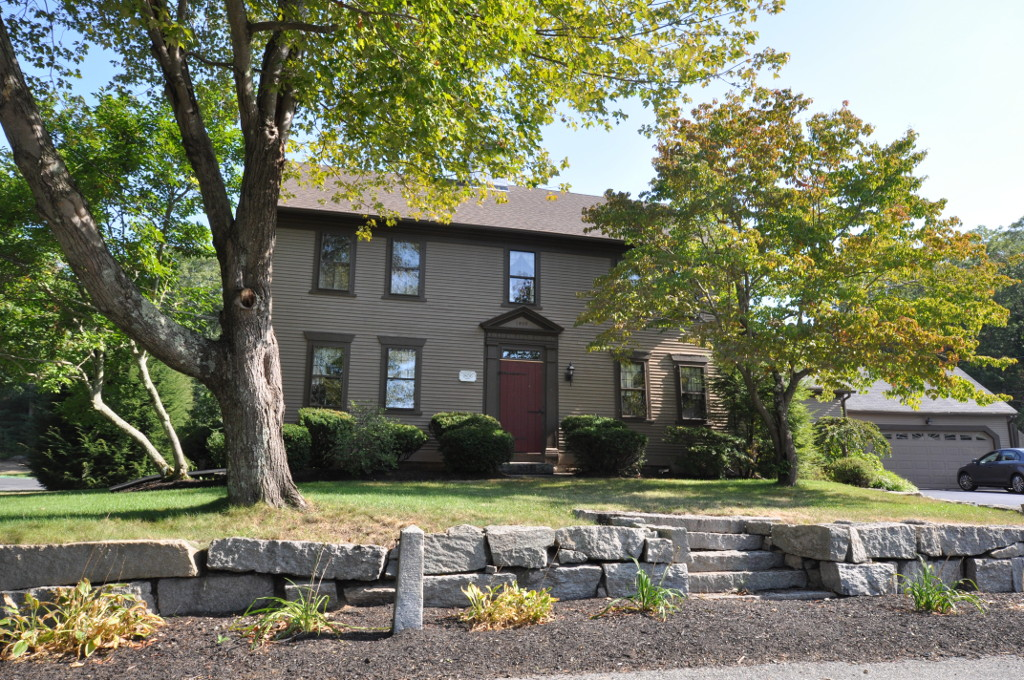
- Location: 52 Albee Rd. Uxbridge, Massachusetts
- Coordinates: 42.041753°N 71.598250°W
- MPS: Uxbridge MRA
- NRHP reference No.: 83004123
- Added to NRHP: October 7, 1983

The Sylvanus Holbrook House is a historic house at 52 Albee Road in Uxbridge, Massachusetts. This 2 1/2 story timber-frame house was built c. 1780. It was owned by Sylvanus Holbrook, one of the founding directors of the Blackstone National Bank. It is five bays wide, with a central entry that is a typical Federal style with flanking pilasters supporting a five-light transom window and triangular pediment. Second story windows are butted up to the eave, a common Georgian feature.

The house was listed on the National Register of Historic Places in 1983.

== See also ==
- National Register of Historic Places listings in Uxbridge, Massachusetts
