= E. Brown House =

Historic house in Massachusetts, United States

- U.S. National Register of Historic Places
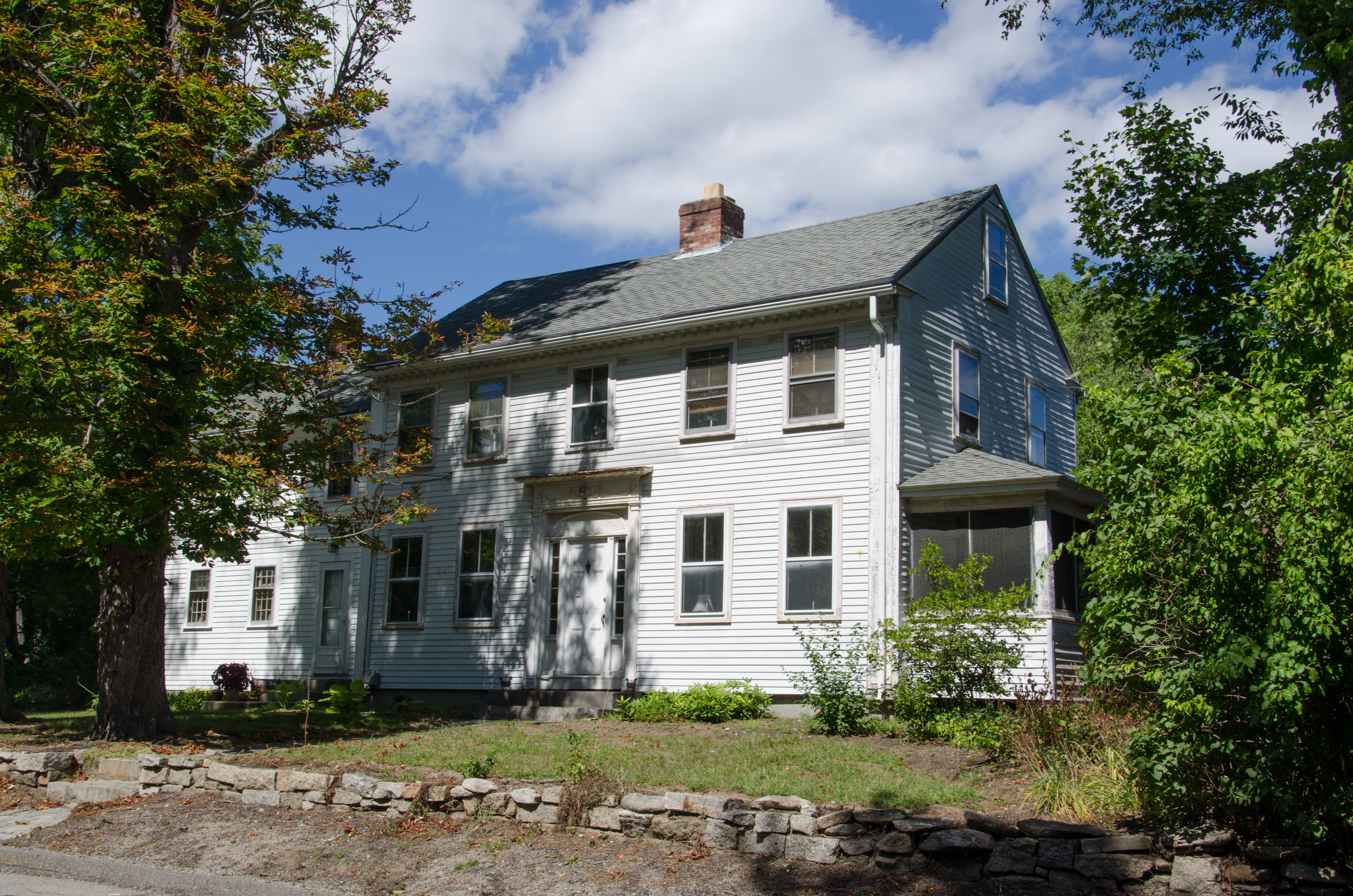

- Location within Massachusetts Location within the United States
- Location: Uxbridge, Massachusetts
- Coordinates: 42°5′24″N 71°39′0″W
- Built: 1805
- Architectural style: Federal
- MPS: Uxbridge MRA
- NRHP reference No.: 83004109
- Added to NRHP: October 7, 1983

The E. Brown House is an historic house located at 7 Sutton Street, in Uxbridge, Massachusetts. It is a 2 1/2-story wood-frame structure, five bays wide, with a side-gable roof, central chimney, and clapboard siding. Despite its otherwise vernacular construction, it has fine quality Federal styling, with corner pilasters and cornice. The cornice and the door surround appear to be carved based on published drawings of Asher Benjamin. The western wing is a 20th-century addition.

On October 7, 1983, it was added to the National Register of Historic Places.

== See also ==
- National Register of Historic Places listings in Uxbridge, Massachusetts
