= Francis Deane Cottage =

Historic house in Massachusetts, United States

- U.S. National Register of Historic Places
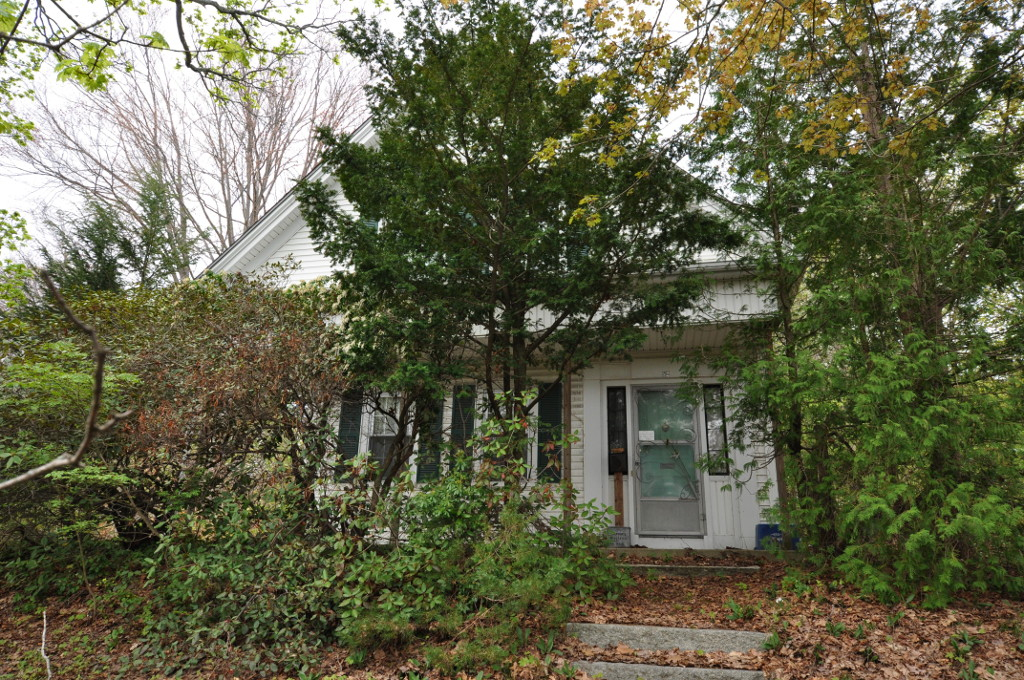

- Location within Massachusetts Location within the United States
- Location: Uxbridge, Massachusetts
- Coordinates: 42°4′43″N 71°37′57″W
- Built: 1845
- Architectural style: Greek Revival
- MPS: Uxbridge MRA
- NRHP reference No.: 83004116
- Added to NRHP: October 7, 1983

The Francis Deane Cottage is an historic house located at 52 North Main Street, in Uxbridge, Massachusetts. The 1 1/2 story wood-frame house was built c. 1845–55, most likely for its first occupant, a local lawyer named Francis Deane. The house is a well preserved local instance of Greek Revival styling, with a pedimented gable that projects over a porch that is supported by Doric columns. The main entry is framed by sidelight windows and panelled stiles, and is topped by a decorative panel.

On October 7, 1983, it was added to the National Register of Historic Places.

== See also ==
- National Register of Historic Places listings in Uxbridge, Massachusetts
