= National Register of Historic Places listings in Uxbridge, Massachusetts =

Uxbridge, Massachusetts has 53 sites on the National Register of Historic Places.

The locations of National Register properties and districts (at least for all showing latitude and longitude coordinates below) may be seen in an online map by clicking on "Map of all coordinates".

This National Park Service list is complete through NPS recent listings posted August 7, 2026.

== Uxbridge ==
	Name on the Register	Image	Date listed	Location	Description
1	Benjamin Adams House	Benjamin Adams House	October 7, 1983 (#83004101)	85 N. Main St. 42°04′49″N 71°38′03″W	Listed at 81 North Main.
2	E. Albee House	E. Albee House	October 7, 1983 (#83004102)	217 Chapin St. 42°04′07″N 71°35′42″W	Listed on Highland St.
3	Daniel Aldrich Cottage and Sawmill	Daniel Aldrich Cottage and Sawmill	October 7, 1983 (#83004103)	364 Aldrich St. 42°01′39″N 71°38′27″W	
4	J. Aldrich House	J. Aldrich House	January 20, 1984 (#84002896)	389 Aldrich St. 42°01′38″N 71°38′35″W	
5	S. Aldrich House	S. Aldrich House	October 7, 1983 (#83004104)	317 Aldrich St. 42°01′44″N 71°38′17″W	
6	W. Aldrich House	W. Aldrich House	October 7, 1983 (#83004105)	180 Henry St. 42°04′50″N 71°36′03″W	
7	Bank Building (Uxbridge, Massachusetts)	Bank Building (Uxbridge, Massachusetts)	October 7, 1983 (#83004106)	1 South Main Street; 42°04′30″N 71°37′43″W	
8	Blackstone Canal Historic District	Blackstone Canal Historic District	February 6, 1973 (#73000328)	Historic canal route between Providence, Rhode Island and Worcester, Massachusetts; 42°08′39″N 71°40′36″W	Initial listing included 3.5 mile stretch of canal in Northbridge and Uxbridge; expanded in 1995 to include the entire historic route of the canal from Worcester to the Rhode Island line (#95001004).
9	E. Brown House	E. Brown House	October 7, 1983 (#83004109)	7 Sutton St. 42°05′N 71°39′W	Listed at 3 Sutton Street.
10	Butler Block	Butler Block	October 7, 1983 (#83004110)	166 Linwood St. 42°05′48″N 71°38′41″W	Listed at 210 Linwood Street.
11	Charles Capron House	Charles Capron House	October 7, 1983 (#83004111)	2 Capron St. 42°04′40″N 71°37′39″W	
12	George Carpenter House	George Carpenter House	October 7, 1983 (#83004112)	53 S. Main St. 42°04′25″N 71°37′42″W	Listed at 67 South Main Street.
13	Central Woolen Mills District	Central Woolen Mills District	January 20, 1984 (#84002905)	Mendon and Cross Sts. 42°04′49″N 71°37′16″W	
14	A. Chapin House	A. Chapin House	October 7, 1983 (#83004113)	36 Pleasant St. 42°04′28″N 71°37′49″W	Listed at 26 Pleasant St.
15	A. E. Cook House	A. E. Cook House	October 7, 1983 (#83004115)	176 Aldrich St. 42°01′56″N 71°37′46″W	
16	Francis Deane Cottage	Francis Deane Cottage	October 7, 1983 (#83004116)	52 N. Main St. 42°04′43″N 71°37′57″W	Listed at 58 N. Main St.
17	Farnum Block	Farnum Block	October 7, 1983 (#83004117)	2-6 N. Main St. 42°04′34″N 71°37′49″W	Demolished.
18	Coronet John Farnum House	Coronet John Farnum House	May 7, 1980 (#80001682)	44 Mendon St. 42°04′37″N 71°37′41″W	
19	Moses Farnum House	Moses Farnum House	October 7, 1983 (#83004118)	435 Quaker Hwy (MA 146); 42°02′27″N 71°37′20″W	
20	R. Farnum House	R. Farnum House	October 7, 1983 (#83004119)	22 Oak St. 42°04′46″N 71°37′33″W	Listed at 20 Oak Street.
21	William and Mary Farnum House	William and Mary Farnum House	January 20, 1984 (#84002914)	4 Albee Rd. 42°02′42″N 71°36′30″W	Destroyed by fire in 2013.
22	Friends Meetinghouse	Friends Meetinghouse	January 24, 1974 (#74000395)	479 Quaker Hwy. 42°02′21″N 71°37′16″W	
23	Granite Store	Granite Store	October 7, 1983 (#83004120)	110 Hecla St. 42°04′28″N 71°36′47″W	Listed at 112-116 Hecla Street.
24	S.A. Hall House	S.A. Hall House	October 7, 1983 (#83004121)	147 N. Main St. 42°04′54″N 71°38′16″W	Listed at 133 North Main Street.
25	William Hayward House	William Hayward House	October 7, 1983 (#83004122)	77 N. Main St. 42°04′48″N 71°38′02″W	
26	Sylvanus Holbrook House	Sylvanus Holbrook House	October 7, 1983 (#83004123)	52 Albee Rd. 42°02′41″N 71°36′35″W	
27	Ironstone Mill Housing and Cellar Hole	Ironstone Mill Housing and Cellar Hole	October 7, 1983 (#83004124)	135 Ironstone St. 42°01′38″N 71°36′34″W	
28	Judson-Taft House	Judson-Taft House	October 7, 1983 (#83004125)	46 Pleasant St. 42°04′29″N 71°37′49″W	Listed at 30 Pleasant St.
29	J. Kensley House	J. Kensley House	October 7, 1983 (#83004126)	342 Chestnut St. 42°01′41″N 71°37′32″W	Misspelled in National Register as "J. Kensely House"
30	North Uxbridge School	North Uxbridge School	October 7, 1983 (#83004127)	87 E. Hartford Ave. 42°05′31″N 71°38′21″W	
31	Dexter Richardson House	Dexter Richardson House	October 7, 1983 (#83004128)	5 South St. 42°01′29″N 71°36′52″W	
32	Joseph Richardson House	Joseph Richardson House	October 7, 1983 (#83004129)	685 Chockalog St. 42°01′47″N 71°40′21″W	
33	Rivulet Mill Complex	Rivulet Mill Complex	October 7, 1983 (#83004130)	60 Rivulet St. 42°05′15″N 71°38′40″W	
34	Richard Sayles House	Richard Sayles House	October 7, 1983 (#83004131)	80 Mendon St. 42°04′43″N 71°37′27″W	
35	Rogerson's Village Historic District	Rogerson's Village Historic District	November 23, 1971 (#71000092)	Northern and southern sides of Hartford Ave. 42°05′34″N 71°38′11″W	
36	Elisha Southwick House	Elisha Southwick House	October 7, 1983 (#83004132)	255 Chockalog St. 42°02′22″N 71°38′45″W	
37	Israel Southwick House	Israel Southwick House	October 7, 1983 (#83004133)	70 Mendon St. 42°04′42″N 71°37′33″W	
38	Taft Brothers Block	Taft Brothers Block	October 7, 1983 (#83004137)	2-8 S. Main St. 42°04′34″N 71°37′47″W	
39	Aaron Taft House	Aaron Taft House	October 7, 1983 (#83004134)	215 Hazel St. 42°04′47″N 71°39′07″W	
40	Bazaleel Taft Jr. House and Law Office	Bazaleel Taft Jr. House and Law Office	October 7, 1983 (#83004135)	147 S. Main St. 42°04′01″N 71°37′26″W	
41	George Taft House	George Taft House	October 7, 1983 (#83004138)	153 Richardson St. 42°03′40″N 71°38′18″W	
42	Hon. Bazaleel Taft House	Hon. Bazaleel Taft House	October 7, 1983 (#83004136)	195 S. Main St. 42°04′00″N 71°36′39″W	
43	Moses Taft House	Moses Taft House	October 7, 1983 (#83004139)	50 S. Main St. 42°04′27″N 71°37′41″W	Listed at 66 S. Main St.
44	Samuel Taft House	Samuel Taft House	October 7, 1983 (#83004140)	87 Sutton St. 42°05′28″N 71°39′21″W	
45	Zadock Taft House	Zadock Taft House	October 7, 1983 (#83004148)	115 S. Main St. 42°04′14″N 71°37′34″W	Listed at 112 S. Main St.
46	C.R. Thomson House and Barn	C.R. Thomson House and Barn	October 7, 1983 (#83004142)	795 Chockalog St. 42°01′57″N 71°40′47″W	
47	Uxbridge Common District	Uxbridge Common District	January 20, 1984 (#84002920)	Main, Court, and Douglas Sts. 42°04′38″N 71°37′53″W	
48	Uxbridge Passenger Depot	Uxbridge Passenger Depot	October 7, 1983 (#83004143)	28 S. Main St. 42°04′32″N 71°37′44″W	
49	Uxbridge Town Hall	Uxbridge Town Hall	October 7, 1983 (#83004144)	45 S. Main St. 42°04′31″N 71°37′46″W	
50	Waucantuck Mill Complex	Waucantuck Mill Complex	January 20, 1984 (#84002921)	Mendon and Patrick Henry Sts. 42°04′57″N 71°36′31″W	Historic site of original Luke Taft mill, Reference for historic photo
51	Wheelockville District	Wheelockville District	January 20, 1984 (#84002923)	Mendon and Henry Sts. 42°04′51″N 71°36′47″W	
52	A. Whipple House	A. Whipple House	October 7, 1983 (#83004146)	398 Sutton St. 42°05′54″N 71°40′35″W	
53	N. Williams House	N. Williams House	October 7, 1983 (#83004147)	7 Rawson St. 42°05′24″N 71°40′38″W	

== Former listing ==
	Name on the Register	Image	Date listed	Date removed	Location	Description
1	Crown and Eagle Mills	Crown and Eagle Mills	September 10, 1971 (#71001098)	November 11, 1975	123 Hartford St., E.	Severely damaged by fire on October 2, 1975. Rebuilt.
