= Bank Building (Uxbridge, Massachusetts) =

- U.S. National Register of Historic Places
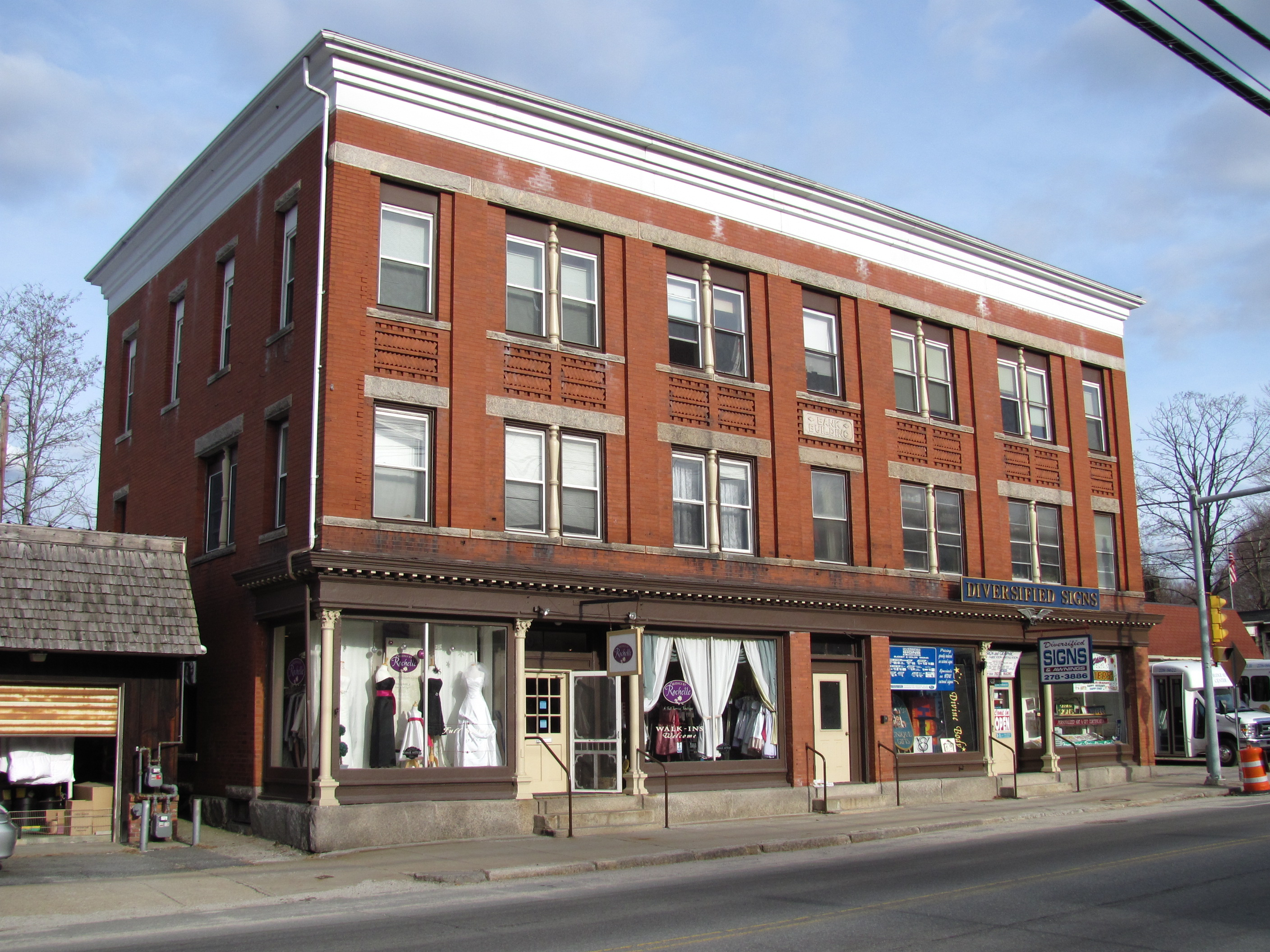
- The Bank Building

- Location within Massachusetts Location within the United States
- Location: Uxbridge, Massachusetts
- Coordinates: 42°4′30″N 71°37′43″W
- Built: 1895
- Architectural style: Late Victorian
- MPS: Uxbridge MRA
- NRHP reference No.: 83004106
- Added to NRHP: October 7, 1983

The Bank Building was a historic commercial building located at 40-44 South Street, in Uxbridge, Massachusetts. Until its destruction by fire in 2013, it was the best-preserved of Uxbridge's 19th century commercial buildings. It was built in 1895–96, and was listed on the National Register of Historic Places in 1983.

== Description and history ==
The Bank Building was located near the southern end of Uxbridge's commercial center, on the east side of South Main Street roughly opposite Town Hall. It was three stories in height, built out of red brick with granite, wooden, and cast iron trim elements. It was covered by a low-pitch hip roof with an unadorned cornice above an entablature. The ground floor consisted of two storefronts flanking a central building entrance, where each storefront had a recessed entrance flanked by plate glass display windows. At either end of these windows were cast iron columns with Corinthian capitals. The first floor was separated from the second by a wooden cornice and granite stringcourse. The upper floors were divided into seven bays, articulated by brick piers. Some of the bays had single sash windows, while the others had two. Decorative brickwork panels separated the second and third-floor windows.

The building was built in 1895–96, and housed commercial storefronts on the ground floor, offices on the second, and a large meeting space on the third floor. Its first tenants were the Blackstone National Bank and the Uxbridge Savings Bank, who had both previously occupied the Capron Building, which burned in 1896. The building was essentially destroyed and then razed following a July 2013 fire.

== See also ==
- National Register of Historic Places listings in Uxbridge, Massachusetts
