= William and Mary Farnum House =

Historic house in Massachusetts, United States

- U.S. National Register of Historic Places
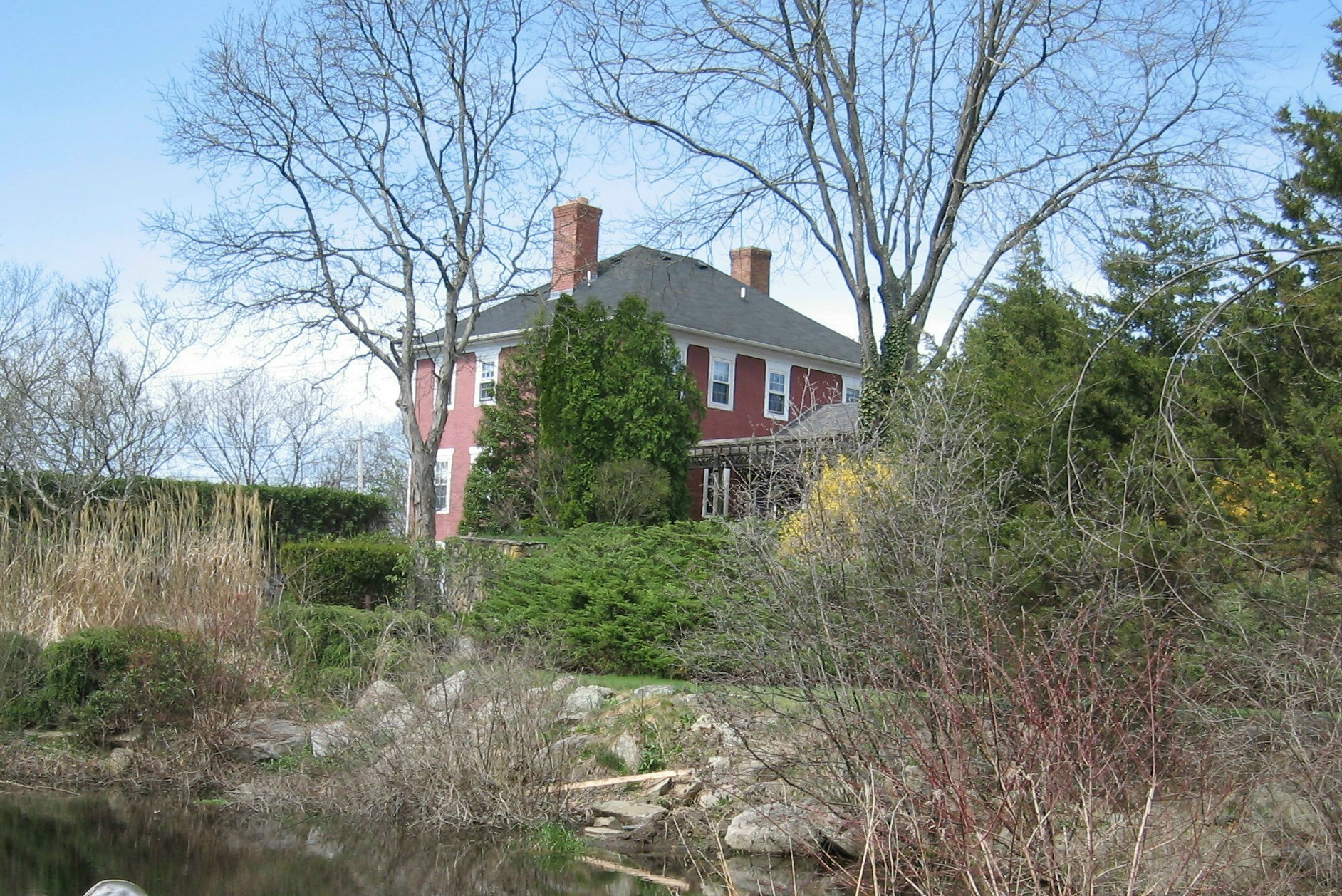
- 4 Albee Road

- Location within Massachusetts Location within the United States
- Location: 4 Albee Rd., Uxbridge, Massachusetts
- Coordinates: 42°2′41.6364″N 71°36′30.5064″W
- Built: 1821
- Architectural style: Federal
- MPS: Uxbridge MRA
- NRHP reference No.: 84002914
- Added to NRHP: January 20, 1984

The William and Mary Farnum House was an historic house located at 4 Albee Road, Uxbridge, Massachusetts, United States. The 2 1/2 story brick house was built in 1821, and was a fine local example of Federal style architecture. The house may have originally been built for the grandchildren of Moses Farnum, a prominent early settler of the area.

== See also ==
- National Register of Historic Places listings in Uxbridge, Massachusetts
