= A. Chapin House =

Historic house in Massachusetts, United States

- U.S. National Register of Historic Places
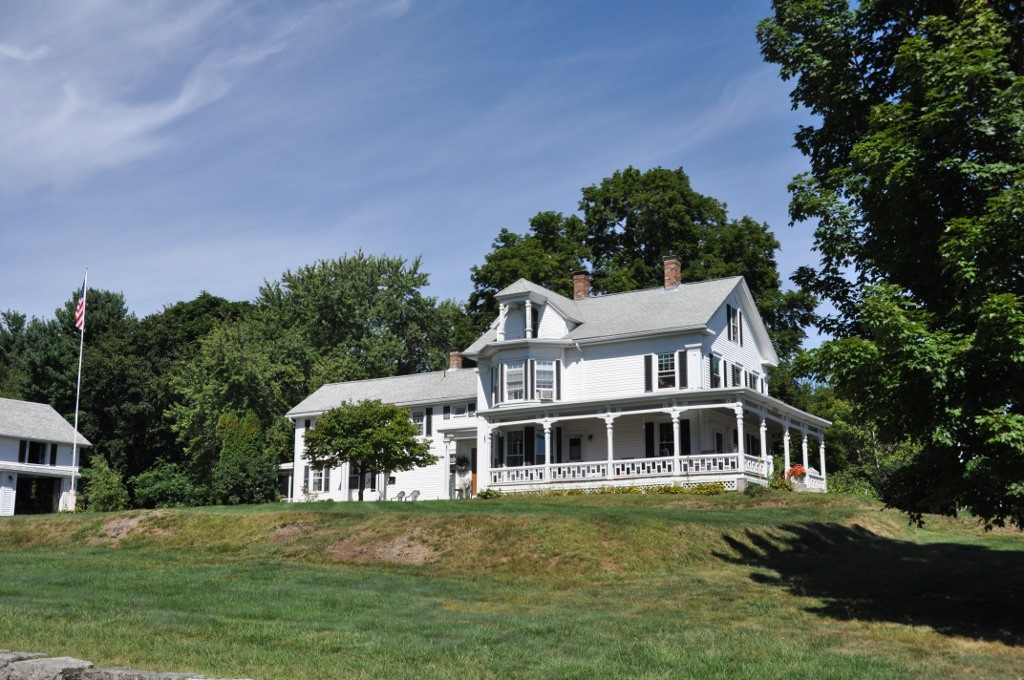

- Location within Massachusetts Location within the United States
- Location: 36 Pleasant Street, Uxbridge, Massachusetts
- Coordinates: 42°4′28″N 71°37′49″W
- Built: 1855
- Architectural style: Greek Revival, Gothic
- MPS: Uxbridge MRA
- NRHP reference No.: 83004113
- Added to NRHP: October 7, 1983

The A. Chapin House is a historic house located at 36 Pleasant Street, in Uxbridge, Massachusetts.

== Description and history ==
It is a 2 1/2-story wood-framed structure, with a front-facing gable roof and clapboard siding. The building corners are pilastered, and it has a wide cornice. The front entry is flanked by sidelight windows and pilasters. The house was built c. 1855-57 as a typical Greek Revival side hall entry house. It was restyled in 1880, adding significant Gothic Revival styling, including an ornately decorated porch. Little is known about most of its owners, including A. Chapin, its first documented owner (1857).

On October 7, 1983, it was added to the National Register of Historic Places, where it is listed at 26 Pleasant Street.

== See also ==
- National Register of Historic Places listings in Uxbridge, Massachusetts
