= Rivulet Mill Complex =

Coordinates: 42.0878°N 71.6445°W

- U.S. National Register of Historic Places
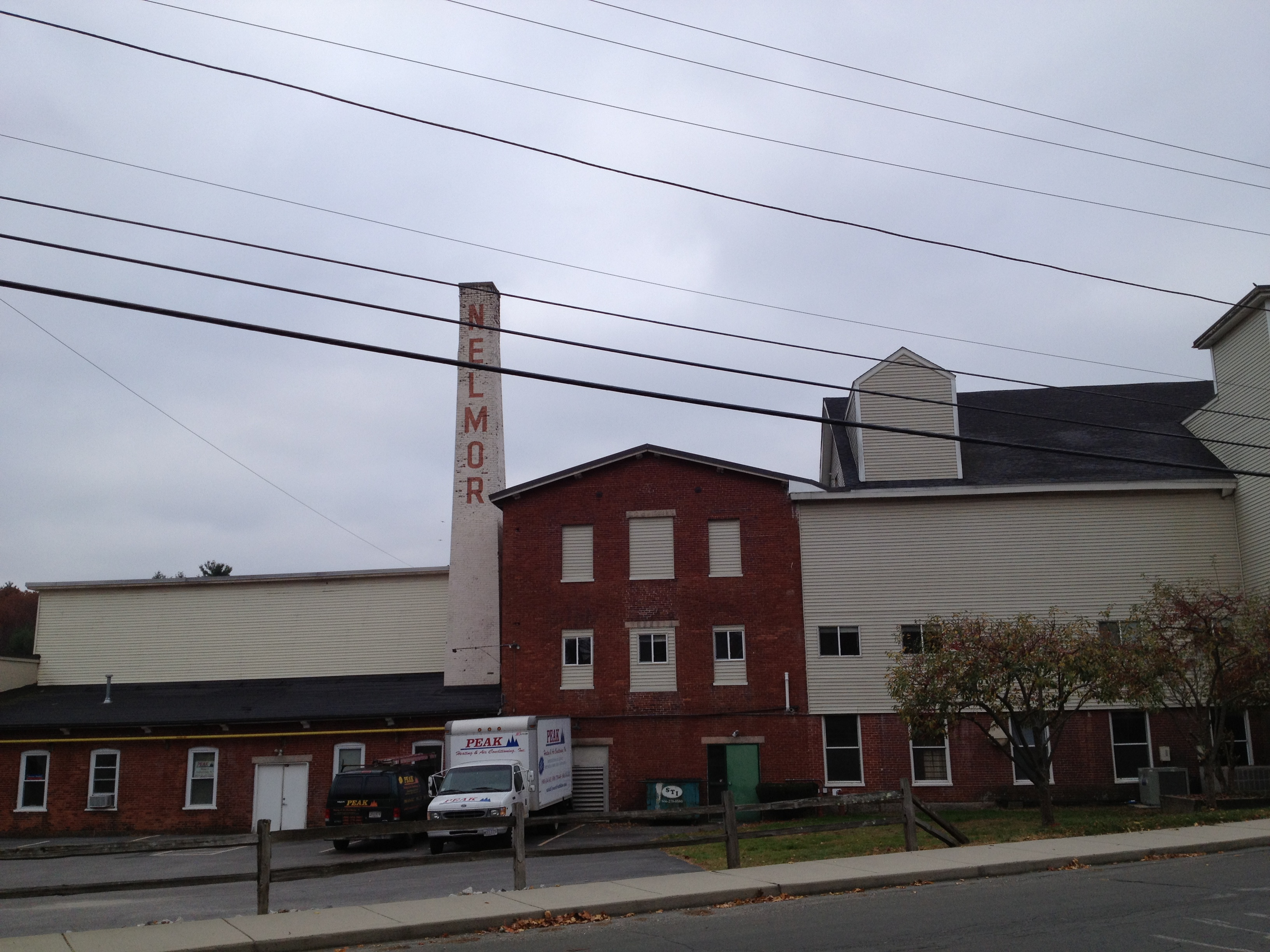
- RIvulet Mill Complex

- Location within Massachusetts Location within the United States
- Location: Uxbridge, Massachusetts
- Built: 1866
- Architectural style: Italianate
- MPS: Uxbridge MRA
- NRHP reference No.: 83004130
- Added to NRHP: October 7, 1983

The Rivulet Mill Complex is an historic group of mill buildings located at 60 Rivulet Street, in Uxbridge, Massachusetts, United States. It was originally built by Chandler Taft. Richard Sayles purchased the mill in 1864 and, after repairs, began the manufacture of shoddy, a yarn made from woolen scraps and used clothing. (Richard Sayles was a graduate of the Uxbridge Academy and his family was prominent in Pawtucket, Rhode Island.) In 1872 the original mill burned and was totally destroyed. Sayles and Zadok Taft rebuilt on site and continued the business under (later) the name of Sayles, Taft & Co. Later still, after Taft retired, the name became the Richard Sayles Mill. The mill was sold out of the Sayles family in 1910. It was operated by the Uxbridge Worsted Company until the mid-1950s.

In October 1983 the complex was added to the National Register of Historic Places.

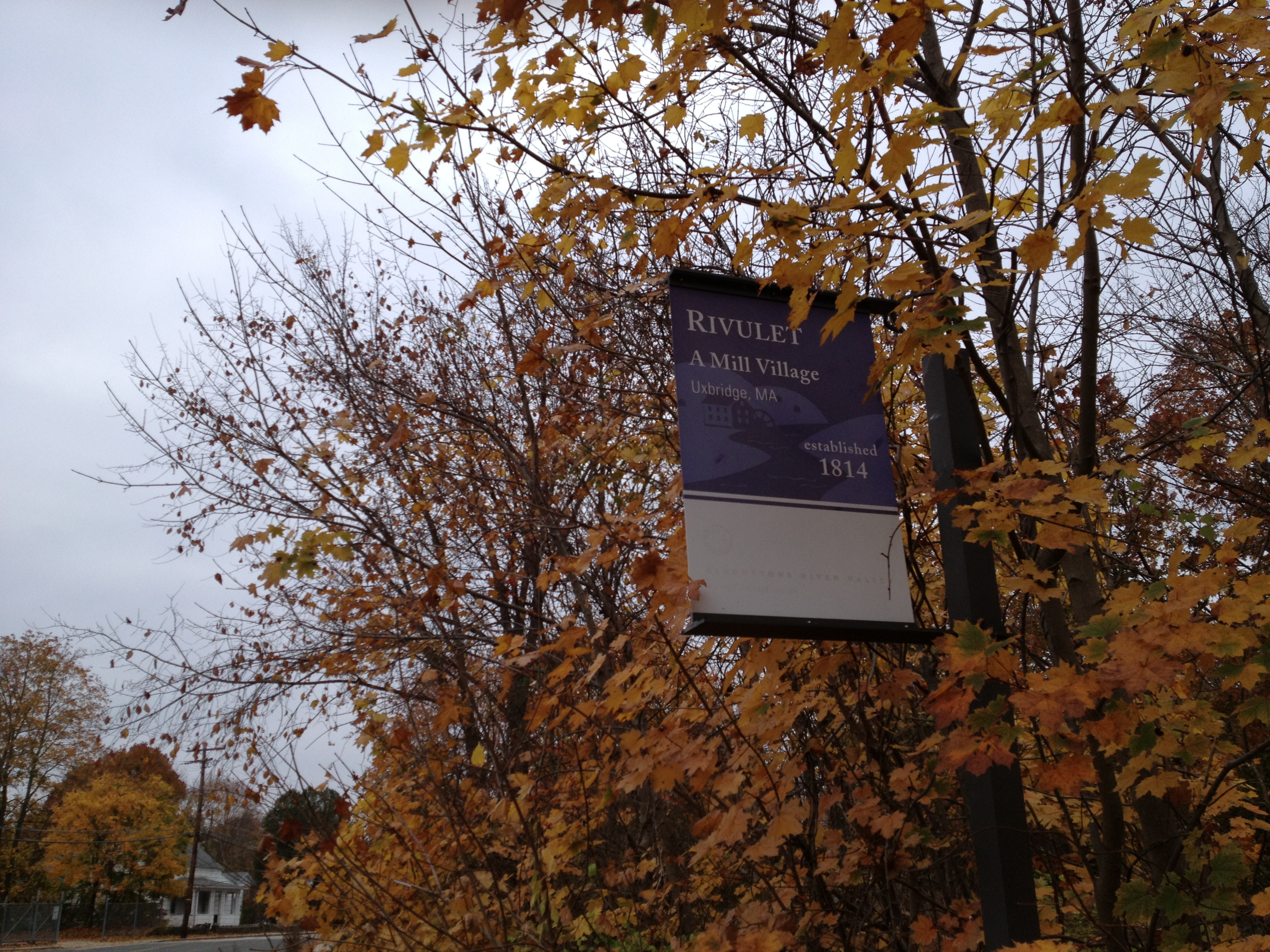
1814 historic marker of RIvulet Mill Village, North Uxbridge

== See also ==
- National Register of Historic Places listings in Uxbridge, Massachusetts
