= Taft (surname) =

Taft is an English surname.

== Persons ==
Notable people with the surname include:

- William Howard Taft (1857–1930), 27th president of the United States and 10th Chief Justice of the United States
- The Taft family, a political dynasty that includes the above-named president:
  - The Tafts of Mendon and Uxbridge, Massachusetts:
    - Robert Taft Sr. (c. 1640–1725), immigrant, patriarch of the Taft family, and ancestor of President Taft
    - Robert Taft, 2nd (1674–1748), colonial-born pioneer son of Robert Taft Sr., he founded the Tafts of Ohio
    - Josiah Taft (1709–1756), grandson of Robert Sr and husband of Lydia Chapin Taft
    - Lydia Chapin Taft (1712–1778), widow of Josiah and the first woman to vote in colonial America
    - Peter Rawson Taft (1785–1867), descendant of Robert Sr, grandfather of President Taft, and a Vermont legislator
  - The Tafts of Ohio:
    - Alphonso Taft (1810–1891), Attorney General and Secretary of War of the United States, co-founder of Skull and Bones, descendant of Robert Sr, and father of President Taft
    - Louise Taft (1827–1907), second wife of Alphonse and mother of the president
    - Henry Waters Taft (1859–1945), American lawyer and brother of the president
    - Charles Phelps Taft (1843–1929), American lawyer and brother of the president
    - Horace Dutton Taft (1861–1943), American educator and brother of the president
    - Robert A. Taft (1889–1953), United States senator from Ohio, son of the president
    - Robert Taft Jr. (1917–1993), Robert A. Taft's son, 1960s U.S. representative and 1970s U.S. Senator from Ohio
    - Bob Taft (born 1942), Robert A. Taft's grandson, a governor of Ohio
    - Patricia Taft (born 1984), Robert A. Taft's granddaughter
- Bill Taft, American rock musician
- Catherine Taft, American art critic
- E. W. Taft, statistical engineer who developed the economic production quantity model
- Earl Taft (1931–2021), American mathematician, husband of Hessy
- George Taft (born 1993), English footballer
- Hessy Levinsons Taft (1934–2026), Jewish child model for Nazi propaganda, wife of Earl
- Jerry Taft (1943–2020), American meteorologist
- Kevin Taft (born 1955), Canadian politician
- Lorado Taft (1860–1936), American sculptor
- Robert F. Taft (1932–2018), a Jesuit priest

== Lists of people by title ==
- Governor Taft (disambiguation)
- Justice Taft (disambiguation)
- Senator Taft (disambiguation)

== Lists of people by the name ==
- Robert Taft (disambiguation)
- William Taft (disambiguation)

== See also ==
- Taft (disambiguation)
