= Taft (disambiguation) =

William Howard Taft (1857–1930) was the 27th president of the United States and 10th Chief Justice of the United States.

Taft may also refer to:

== People ==
- Taft (surname), including a list of people with the name
- Taft family, a political dynasty that includes President Taft
- Governor Taft (disambiguation)
- Justice Taft (disambiguation)
- Senator Taft (disambiguation)
- Taft Love, American politician from Wyoming

=== Fictional characters ===
- Taft, a character in The Tick

== Places ==
=== Germany ===
- Taft (Ulster), a river of Hesse and Thuringia, tributary of the Ulster

=== Iran ===
- Taft, Fars, a village in Poshtkuh-e Rostam Rural District
- Taft, Yazd, a city in Yazd Province
- Taft County, a county in Yazd Province that includes the above city

=== Philippines ===
- Taft, Eastern Samar
- Taft Avenue, Metro Manila

=== United States ===
- Taft, California
- Taft, California, former name of Cromberg, California
- Taft, Florida
- Taft, Kentucky
- Taft, Louisiana
- Taft, Minnesota
- Taft, Missouri
- Taft, Montana
- Taft, Oklahoma
- Taft, Oregon
- Taft, Tennessee
- Taft, Texas
- Taft, Virginia
- Taft, Wisconsin

== Facilities, structures ==
- Taft Avenue MRT station, Taft Avenue, Metro Manila, Philippines
- Taft Bridge, Connecticut Avenue, Washington, D.C., USA; a street bridge
- Taft Building (disambiguation)
- Taft Hotel (disambiguation)
- Taft House (disambiguation)
- Taft School (disambiguation)
- Taft High School (disambiguation)
- Taft Elementary School (disambiguation)

== Groups, organizations ==
- Taft Broadcasting, a former media conglomerate controlled by the Taft family
- Taft Stettinius & Hollister, a United States law firm
- Taft College, Taft, California, USA; a community college
- Taft University System; an online school
  - Taft University, Denver, Colorado, USA; an online university
  - Taft Law School, Santa Ana, California, USA; an online law school
- Taft School District 90, Lockport, Illinois, USA

== Other uses ==
- Synonym for Taffeta
- Daihatsu Taft (disambiguation), several automobiles
