= Taft House =

Taft House may refer to:

in the United States (by state then city)

- Lorado Taft Midway Studios, Chicago, Illinois, listed on the NRHP in Cook County
- Taft Farmstead, Rochester, Illinois, listed on the NRHP in Sangamon County
- Taft–West Warehouse, Des Moines, Iowa, listed on the NRHP in Polk County
- Stephen Harris Taft House, Humboldt, Iowa, listed on the NRHP in Humboldt County
- Judson–Taft House, Uxbridge, Massachusetts, listed on the NRHP in Worcester County
- Taft Brothers Block, Uxbridge, Massachusetts, listed on the NRHP in Worcester County
- Aaron Taft House, Uxbridge, Massachusetts, listed on the NRHP in Worcester County
- Bazaleel Taft Jr. House and Law Office, Uxbridge, Massachusetts, listed on the NRHP in Worcester County
- George Taft House, Uxbridge, Massachusetts, listed on the NRHP in Worcester County
- Hon. Bazaleel Taft House, Uxbridge, Massachusetts, listed on the NRHP in Worcester County
- Moses Taft House (Uxbridge, Massachusetts), listed on NRHP in Worcester County
- Samuel Taft House, Uxbridge, Massachusetts, listed on the NRHP in Worcester County
- Zadock Taft House, Uxbridge, Massachusetts, listed on the NRHP in Worcester County
- Taft House (Chaumont, New York), listed on the NRHP in Jefferson County
- William Howard Taft National Historic Site, Cincinnati, Ohio, listed on the NRHP
- Moses Taft House (Burrillville, Rhode Island), listed on the NRHP in Providence County

== See also ==
- William H. Taft Mansion, New Haven, Connecticut, USA
- Moses Taft House (disambiguation)
- All pages with titles containing "Taft" and "House"
- Taft Building (disambiguation)
- Taft Museum of Art
- Taft (disambiguation)
