= William Taft (disambiguation) =

William Howard Taft (1857–1930) was the 27th president of the United States from 1909 to 1913.

William Taft may also refer to:

== People ==
- William Howard Taft II (1887–1952), son of Henry Waters Taft and nephew of President William Howard Taft
- William Howard Taft III (1915–1991), Son of Robert A Taft U.S. Ambassador to Ireland
- William Howard Taft IV (born 1945), U.S. Deputy Secretary of Defense
- William W. Taft (1932–2024), American politician, member of the Ohio legislature
- Bill Taft (born 1965), American rock musician

== Other uses ==
- William Howard Taft University, Denver, Colorado, USA; an online university
- William Howard Taft Bridge, Connecticut Avenue, Washington, D.C., USA; a street bridge
- William H. Taft Mansion, New Haven, Connecticut, USA

== See also ==
- William Howard Taft High School (disambiguation)
- William Howard Taft Armstrong (1909–2003; "Louie Bluie"), U.S. musician
- All pages with titles containing "William" and "Howard" and "Taft"
- All pages with titles containing "William" and "Taft"
- William (given name)
- Howard (given name)
- Howard (surname)
- Taft (surname)
- William (disambiguation)
- Howard (disambiguation)
- Taft (disambiguation)
