= Taft School (disambiguation) =

Taft School or Taft Schools, may refer to:

- Taft Elementary School (disambiguation)
- Taft High School (disambiguation)
- Taft School in Watertown, Connecticut, founded by Horace Dutton Taft, William Howard Taft's brother
- Taft College, Taft, California, USA; a community college
- Taft University System; an online school
  - William Howard Taft University, Denver, Colorado, USA; an online university
  - Taft Law School, Santa Ana, California, USA; an online law school
- Taft School District 90, Lockport, Illinois, USA

== See also ==
- Taft (disambiguation)
