= Moses Taft House =

Moses Taft House may refer to:

- Moses Taft House (Uxbridge, Massachusetts), listed on the National Register of Historic Places (NRHP)
- Moses Taft House (Burrillville, Rhode Island), NRHP-listed

== See also ==
- Moses Taft
- Taft House (disambiguation)
