= Robert Taft =

Robert Taft may refer to:

== People ==
=== Members of the Taft political family ===
- Robert Taft Sr. (c. 1640–1725; Robert Taft I), 17th century founder of the U.S. Taft political family
- Robert Taft, 2nd (1674–1748; Robert Taft II), colonial-born pioneer, son of the founder
- Robert A. Taft (1889–1953; Robert Alphonso Taft I), United States Senator from Ohio and son of U.S. President and Supreme Court Chief Justice William Howard Taft
- Robert Taft Jr. (1917–1993; Robert Alphonso Taft II), Robert A. Taft's son, 1960s U.S. representative and 1970s U.S. Senator from Ohio
- Bob Taft (born 1942; Robert Alphonso Taft III), Robert A. Taft's grandson, governor of Ohio

=== Others ===
- Robert Taft (chemist and author) (1894–1955), author and chemistry professor at the University of Kansas
- Robert F. Taft (1932–2018), American Jesuit priest and archimandrite of the Eastern Catholic Church

== Other uses ==
- Robert A. Taft Information Technology High School, Cincinnati, Ohio, USA

== See also ==
- All pages with titles containing "Robert" and "Taft"
- Taft family, a prominent political family in the United States
- Taft (disambiguation)
