= Moses Taft House (Burrillville, Rhode Island) =

Historic house in Rhode Island

- U.S. National Register of Historic Places
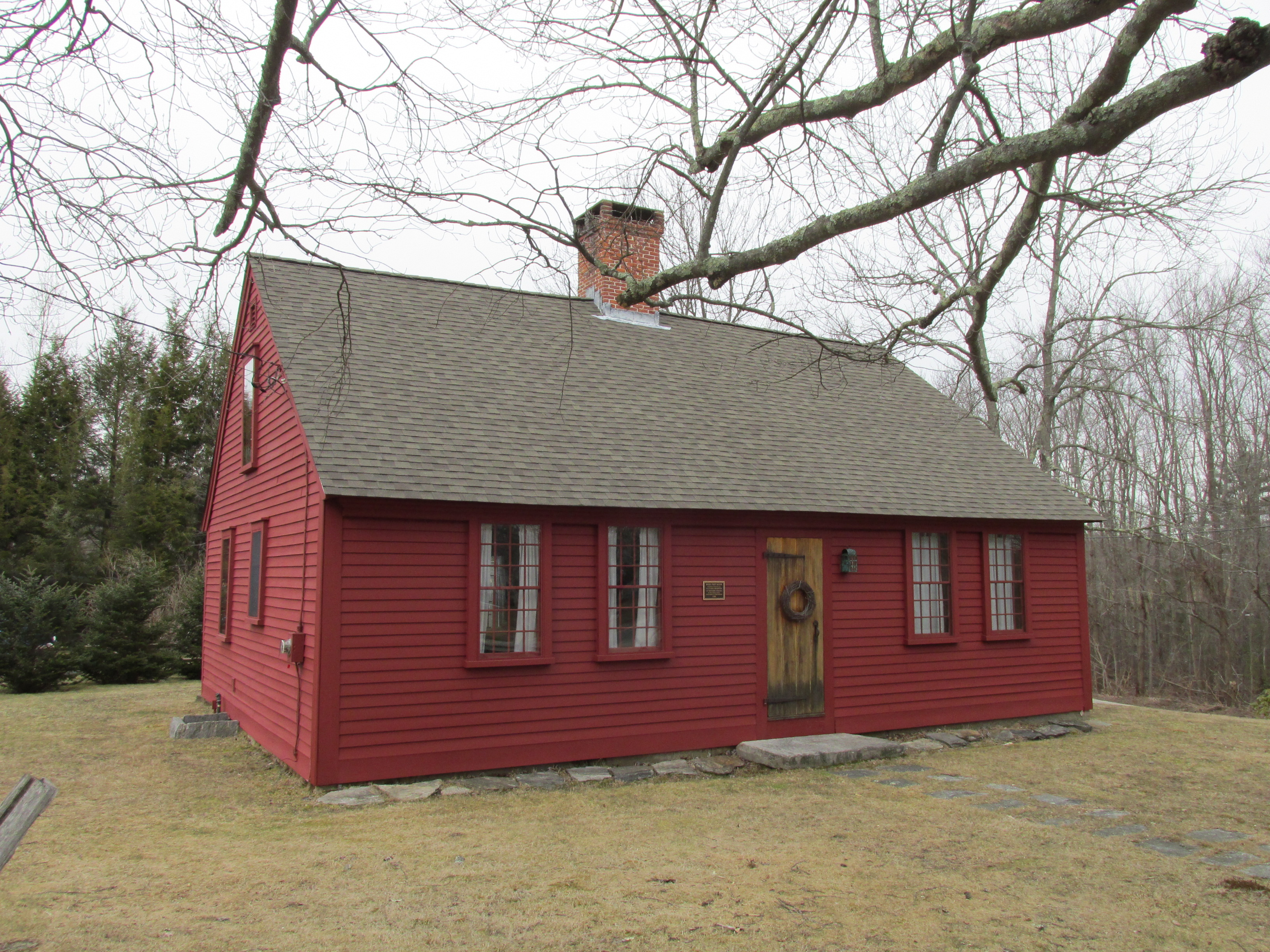
- Moses Taft House

- Location within Rhode Island Location within the United States
- Location: 111 E. Wallum Lake Rd., Burrillville, Rhode Island
- Coordinates: 41°57′58″N 71°43′4″W
- Area: less than one acre
- Built: 1786
- Architectural style: Federal
- NRHP reference No.: 08000718
- Added to NRHP: March 20, 2009

The Moses Taft House is a historic house at 111 East Wallum Lake Road in Burrillville, Rhode Island. The 1 1/2-story side-gable Cape style house was built in 1786, and is a well-preserved example of early Federal architecture. It exhibits the typical five-bay facade, with the entry in the center bay, and a large central chimney. The house underwent a major restoration in the 2000s. Moses Taft was an early owner of the house. He was a farmer who operated a nearby grist mill on the Clear River.

The house was listed on the National Register of Historic Places in 2009.

== See also ==
- National Register of Historic Places listings in Providence County, Rhode Island
- Moses Taft House (Uxbridge, Massachusetts), former home of Moses Taft, a 19th-century American industrialist
