= Peter Rawson Taft =

American politician

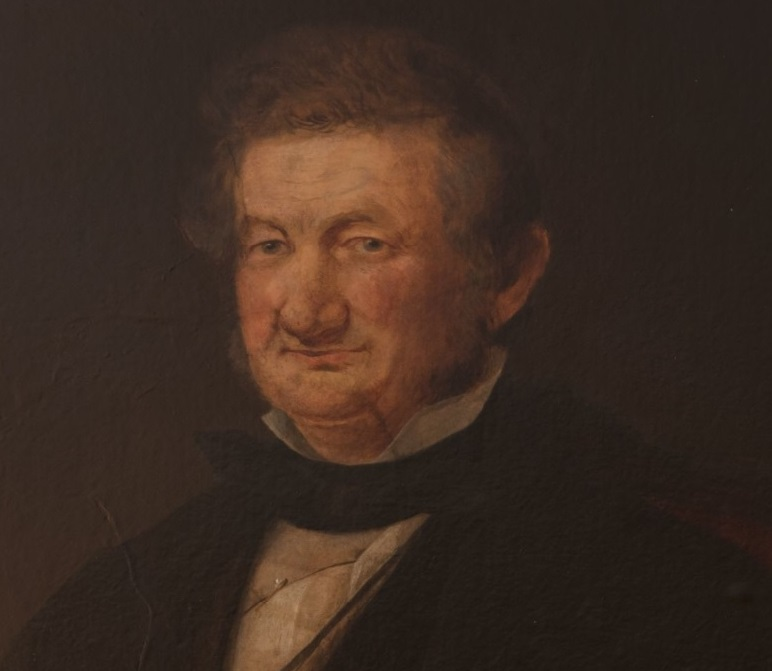
- Portrait of Peter Rawson Taft
- Born: April 14, 1785; Uxbridge, Massachusetts
- Died: January 1, 1867 (aged 81); Cincinnati, Ohio
- Occupation: Politician
- Known for: William Howard Taft's grandfather
- Spouse: Sylvia Howard
- Children: Alphonso Taft
- Parent(s): Aaron Taft; Rhoda Rawson
- Relatives: See Taft family

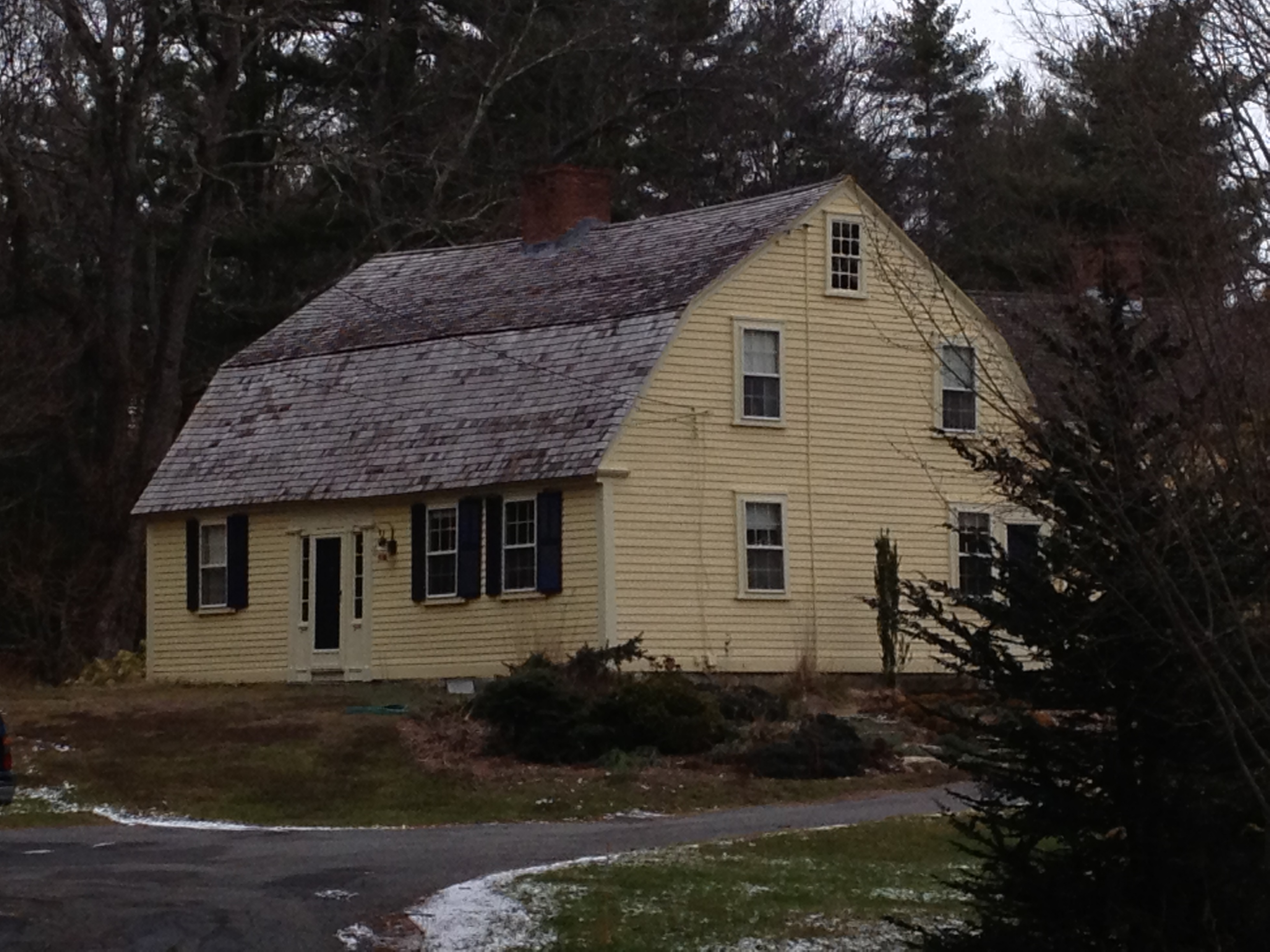
Aaron Taft House is where Peter Rawson Taft was born in 1785

Peter Rawson Taft (April 14, 1785 – January 1, 1867) was an American lawyer, judge, and legislator. His son Alphonso Taft served as the U.S. Secretary of War (1876), and U.S. Attorney General (1876–1877). Alphonso was the father and Peter was the grandfather of President William Howard Taft.

== Early life and family ==
Peter Rawson Taft was born to Aaron Taft and Rhoda (née Rawson) Taft on April 14, 1785, at Uxbridge in Worcester County, Massachusetts.

Aaron Taft was educated at Princeton College. The Taft's lived at the Aaron Taft House in Uxbridge, which is listed on the National Register of Historic Places. Aaron was a farmer. He took his family to Vermont in 1799, when Taft was 14 years of age. Taft was reared a farmer, with a common-school education. He enjoyed reading and was studious. Taft taught at local schools for five to six years and he worked as a surveyor for several years.

Taft descended from Robert Taft Sr. (1640–1725), the first Taft who immigrated to Colonial America. (Note: Taft's grandfather was also Peter Taft, and his grandfather was Robert Taft Sr. (1640–1725), the first Taft who immigrated to Colonial America and settled at Mendon and Uxbridge, Massachusetts. Peter Rawson Taft was then the 5th generation descendant of Robert Taft Sr. Uxbridge and Mendon were the birthplace of the famous American Taft family.) His mother was a descendant of Edward Rawson, who was the secretary of the Massachusetts Bay Colony from 1650 to 1681.

== Marriage and child ==
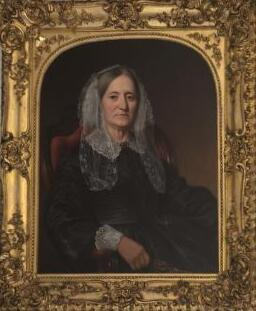
Sylvia Howard Taft, grandmother of President William Howard Taft

In 1810, Taft married Sylvia Howard of Townshend, Vermont, Windham County, Vermont. She was the daughter of Levi Howard and Bethiah Chapin of Vermont.

Their son was Alphonso Taft, born on November 5, 1810, at Townshend. Alphonso became the U.S. Secretary of War (1876), and U.S. Attorney General (1876–1877). Alphonso Taft co-founded Skull and Bones at Yale.

== Lawyer and legislator ==
Taft who studied law by himself, became a successful lawyer and judge. He served many years in the Vermont House of Representatives, and was judge of the Probate and County Courts of Windham County, Vermont for eight years. Taft became Judge of the Court of Common Pleas and he was one of the Commissioners of the County. From 1835 to 1841, Taft said on the board of trustees for the Leland and Gray seminary, an organization that he helped establish. He was also the seminary's first president.

== Ohio ==
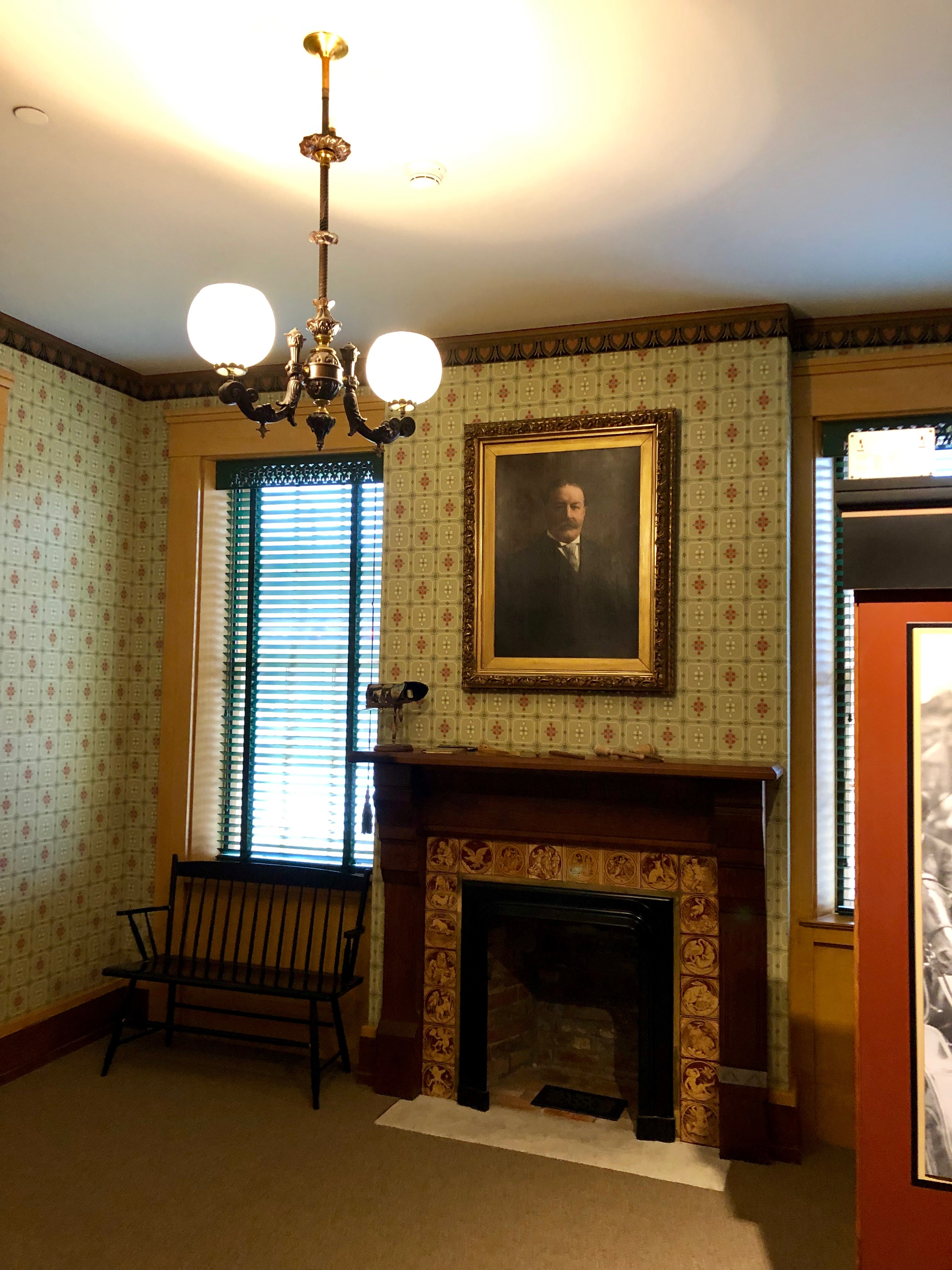
Peter and Sylvia Taft Bedroom, William Howard Taft National Historic Site, Mount Auburn, Cincinnati, Ohio

Taft moved to Cincinnati, Ohio in 1841. He died there on January 1, 1867. Sylvia died within the year before Taft's death.

William Howard Taft (President of the United States) was Taft's grandson. The Taft family continued the tradition of returning to Uxbridge for family reunions. Descendants of Taft's great-grandfather Robert Taft include judges, lawyers, educators, legislators, and community leaders.
