= Taft Hopf algebra =

In algebra, a Taft Hopf algebra is a Hopf algebra introduced by Earl Taft (1971) that is neither commutative nor cocommutative and has an antipode of large even order.

== Construction ==
Suppose that k is a field with a primitive n'th root of unity ζ for some positive integer n. The Taft algebra is the n^{2}-dimensional associative algebra generated over k by c and x with the relations c^{n}=1, x^{n}=0, xc=ζcx. The coproduct takes c to c⊗c and x to c⊗x + x⊗1. The counit takes c to 1 and x to 0. The antipode takes c to c^{−1} and x to –c^{−1}x: the order of the antipode is 2n (if n > 1).
