= Taft Building =

Taft Building may refer to:

in the United States

(by state)

- Taft Building (Los Angeles), a historic building
- Taft Brothers Block, Uxbridge, Massachusetts
- Timothy J. McCarthy Building, Faribault, Minnesota, also known as Taft Building
- The Michelangelo, also known as Taft Hotel building, New York City

== See also ==
- Taft School (disambiguation)
- Taft House (disambiguation)
- Taft Homes
- Lorado Taft Midway Studios, Chicago, Illinois
