= Communications in Algebra =

- Discipline: Algebra
- Language: English

Publication details
- History: 1974–present
- Publisher: Taylor & Francis
- Frequency: Monthly
- Impact factor: 0.7 (2022)

Standard abbreviations
- ISO 4: Commun. Algebra

Indexing
- ISSN: 0092-7872 (print); 1532-4125 (web)

Links
- Journal homepage

Communications in Algebra is a monthly peer-reviewed scientific journal covering algebra, including commutative algebra, ring theory, module theory, non-associative algebra (including Lie algebras and Jordan algebras), group theory, and algebraic geometry. It was established in 1974 and is published by Taylor & Francis. The editor-in-chief is Scott Chapman (Sam Houston State University). Earl J. Taft (Rutgers University) was the founding editor.

In March 2026, its editorial board resigned en masse over decisions by the publisher to increase the number of required referee reports per submission and to remove the editor-in-chief without consulting the board.

== Abstracting and indexing ==
The journal is abstracted and indexed in CompuMath Citation Index, Current Contents/Chemical, Earth, and Physical Sciences, Mathematical Reviews, MathSciNet, Science Citation Index Expanded (SCIE), and Zentralblatt MATH. According to the Journal Citation Reports, the journal has a 2022 impact factor of 0.7.

== Controversies ==
In January 2020, the journal published the paper "Eight-dimensional octonion-like but associative normed division algebra" by Joy Christian, whose results would contradict the statement of Hurwitz's theorem if true. The paper was later retracted by the journal's editorial board.
