= Taft Elementary School =

There are a number of elementary schools named Taft Elementary School:

- Robert A. Taft Elementary School
- Taft Elementary School (Arizona)
- Taft Elementary School (Orange, California)
- Taft Elementary School (Redwood, California)
- Taft Elementary School (Santa Ana, California)
- Taft Elementary School (Stockton, California)
- Taft Elementary School (Idaho)
- Taft Elementary School (Illinois)
- Taft Elementary School (Iowa)
- Taft Elementary School (New York)
- Taft Elementary School (Ashland, Ohio)
- Taft Elementary School (Youngstown, Ohio)
- Taft Elementary School (Oregon)
- Taft Elementary School (Wisconsin)
- Taft Galloway Elementary School
- William H. Taft Elementary School (Cincinnati)
- William H. Taft Elementary School (Marion, Ohio)
- William Howard Taft Elementary School

== See also ==
- Taft (disambiguation)
