= Earl Taft =

American mathematician (1931–2021)

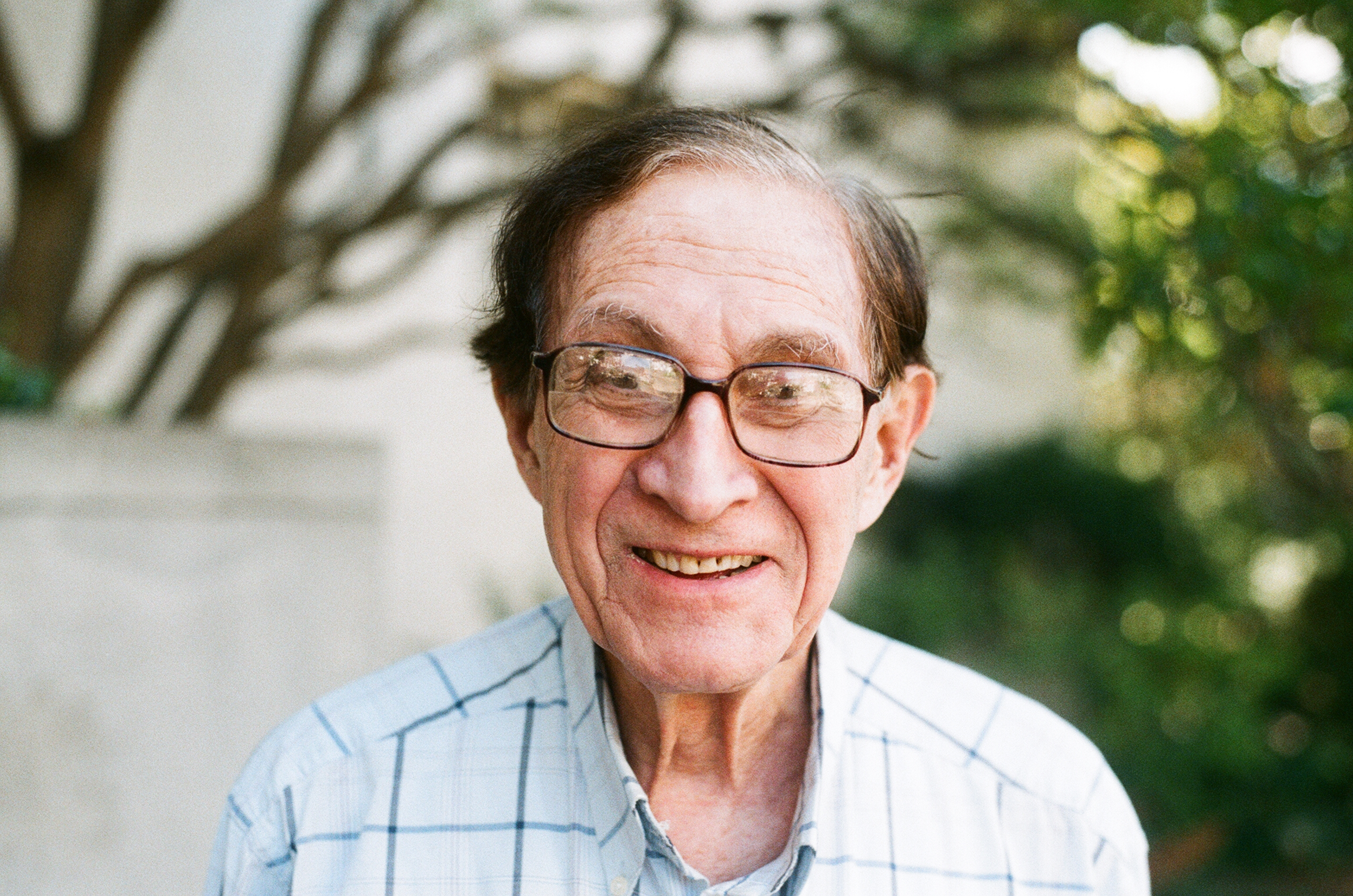
- Taft in the early 2010s
- Born: Earl Jay Taft; 1931
- Died: August 9, 2021 (aged 89); San Francisco, California, U.S.
- Education: Amherst College; Yale University
- Occupation: Mathematician
- Spouse: Hessy Levinsons
- Children: 2

Earl Jay Taft (1931 – August 9, 2021) was an American mathematician specializing in abstract algebra. He is the namesake of the Taft Hopf algebra which he introduced in a 1971 publication, and he was the founding editor of the journal Communications in Algebra. He was Distinguished Professor Emeritus of Mathematics at Rutgers University.

== Education and career ==
Taft graduated from Amherst College in 1952. He completed his doctorate at Yale University in 1956. His dissertation, Invariant Wedderburn Factors, was supervised by Nathan Jacobson. After working as Ritt Instructor of mathematics at Columbia University from 1956 to 1959, he moved to Rutgers University, where he remained for many years. He was also a regular visitor to the Institute for Advanced Study.

== Personal life ==
Taft's wife, Hessy Levinsons Taft, had been publicized as "the most beautiful Aryan baby" in Nazi propaganda despite being Jewish. Her family escaped Nazi Germany for France, Cuba, and later the US, and she met Taft as a graduate student in chemistry at Columbia University, while he was an instructor there.

After Taft retired from Rutgers, he and his wife moved to New York City. Taft died in San Francisco at the age of 89.
