= Alphonso Taft =

American diplomat and Attorney General (1810–1891)

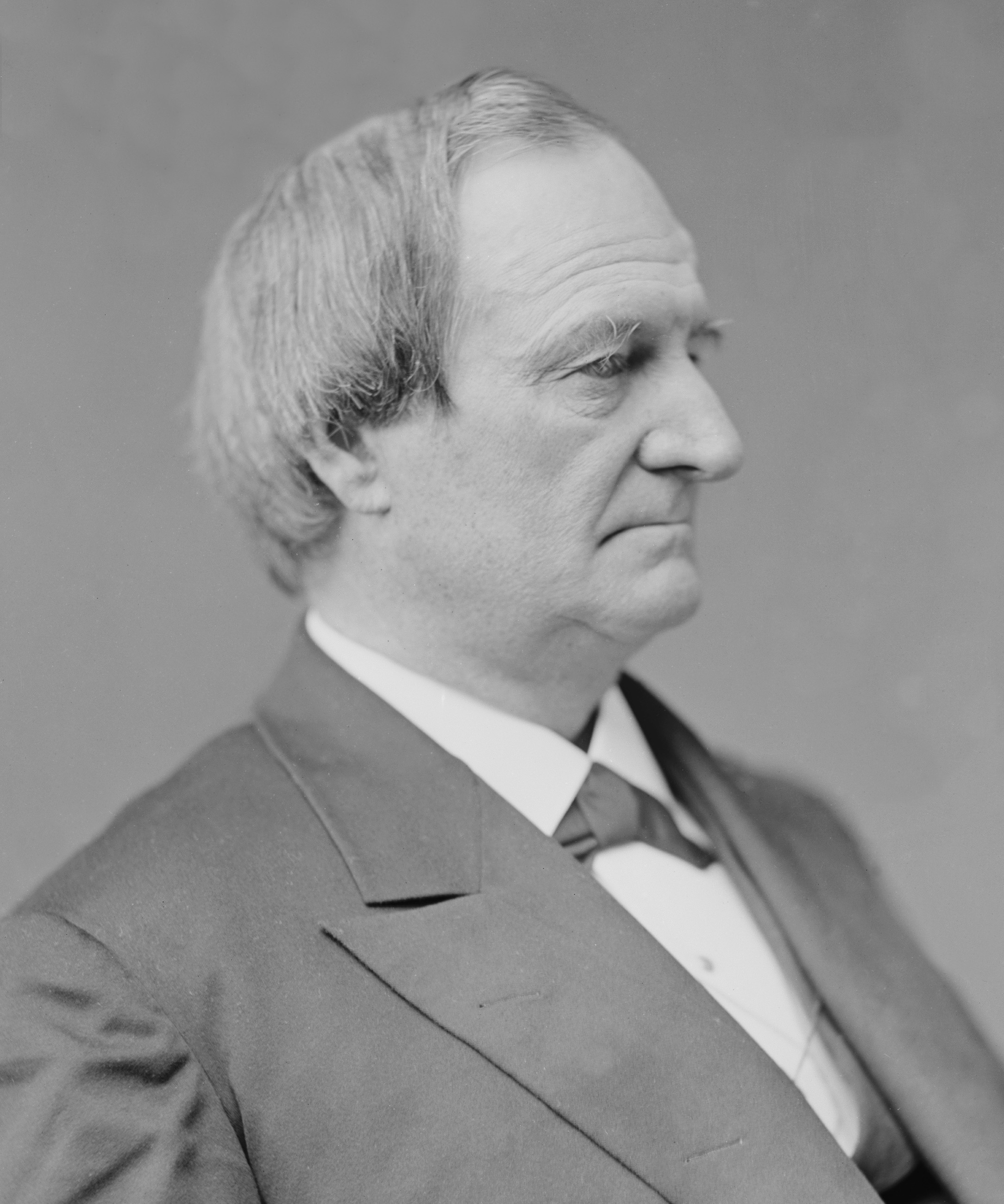
- Taft, 1865–1880

34th United States Attorney General
- In office May 22, 1876 – March 4, 1877
- President: Ulysses S. Grant
- Preceded by: Edwards Pierrepont
- Succeeded by: Charles Devens

31st United States Secretary of War
- In office March 8, 1876 – May 22, 1876
- President: Ulysses S. Grant
- Preceded by: William W. Belknap
- Succeeded by: J. Donald Cameron

United States Minister to Russia
- In office September 3, 1884 – July 31, 1885
- Appointed by: Chester A. Arthur
- Preceded by: William H. Hunt
- Succeeded by: George V. N. Lothrop

12th United States Minister to Austria-Hungary
- In office June 30, 1882 – August 25, 1884
- Appointed by: Chester A. Arthur
- Preceded by: William Walter Phelps
- Succeeded by: John M. Francis

Personal details
- Born: November 5, 1810 Townshend, Vermont, U.S.
- Died: May 21, 1891 (aged 80) San Diego, California, U.S.
- Resting place: Spring Grove Cemetery; Cincinnati, Ohio, U.S.
- Party: Republican
- Spouses: Fanny Phelps (m. 1841; died 1852) Louise Torrey (m. 1853)
- Children: 10, including Charles, William, Henry, Horace
- Parents: Peter Rawson Taft (father); Sylvia Howard (mother)
- Education: Yale University (BA)

Alphonso Taft (November 5, 1810 – May 21, 1891) was an American jurist, diplomat, and politician who served as United States attorney general and secretary of war under President Ulysses S. Grant. He was also the founder of the Taft political dynasty, and father of Congressman Charles Phelps Taft and President William Howard Taft, and the grandfather of Senator Robert A. Taft.

As Secretary of War, Taft's popular appointment by Grant did much to restore the integrity of the War Department. Taft reformed the War Department by allowing commanders at Indian forts to choose who could start and run post traderships, and by making reductions in wasteful military spending. While serving as Attorney General, he strongly held that African Americans must not be denied the right to vote through intimidation and violence. Attorney General Taft coauthored a bill to Congress, signed into law by President Grant, that created the Elections Commission that settled the controversial Hayes-Tilden presidential election.

Taft was appointed as minister to Austria-Hungary by Chester A. Arthur in 1882. He served until July 4, 1884, and was then transferred by President Arthur to Minister of Russia, and he served in St. Petersburg until August 1885. Taft had a reputation for serving political office with integrity and character. Taft was a rare and modern 19th century politician who supported black voting rights and who reduced government corruption while holding office.

== Early life ==
Alphonso Taft was born in Townshend, Vermont, the only child of Peter Rawson Taft of the powerful Taft family, and Sylvia Howard, on November 5, 1810. He was descended from Robert Taft Sr. who had migrated to America from County Louth, Ireland. His mother Sylvia was either of Scottish or Irish descent. While the Taft family was of substance and education, they were not considered wealthy. Taft attended local schools until the age of sixteen. He then taught school to earn money to attend Amherst Academy. During his time at Amherst, he and Samuel Colt stole a cannon belonging to General Ebenezer Mattoon and shot it at their school. Taft entered Yale College in 1829 and he graduated four years later in 1833. Taft helped create the secret society known as Skull and Bones in 1832 with William Huntington Russell.

Upon graduation, again to earn money, Taft was an instructor at Ellington, Connecticut, from 1835 to 1837. He subsequently studied law at the Yale Law School and was admitted to the Connecticut bar in 1838. While studying law Taft held a tutorship at Yale. Taft had no desire to remain in New England, and he stated to his father Peter in a letter written on July 22, 1837, that Vermont was a "noble state to emigrate from." Taft did not want to practice law in New York because he believed people were under the corrupting influence of wealth. In 1839, Taft migrated to Cincinnati, where he was a member of the Cincinnati City Council, and he became one of the most influential citizens of Ohio. He was a member of the boards of trustees of the University of Cincinnati, Antioch College, and Yale College.

== Marriages, family, and estate ==
Alphonso Taft was married twice. In 1841 he married Fanny Phelps (born 1823), daughter of Judge Charles Phelps, and they had five children, three of whom died in infancy:

- Charles Phelps Taft (December 21, 1843 – December 31, 1929)
- Peter Rawson Taft II (May 10, 1846 – June 3, 1889)
- Mary Taft (November 24, 1848 – November 29, 1848)
- Alphonso Taft (May 12, 1850 – March 2, 1851)
- Alphonso Taft (December 22, 1851 – June 22, 1852)

Fanny Taft died on June 2, 1852, twenty days before her last child's death. On December 26, 1853, Taft married Louisa Maria (née Torrey) (born 1827), his fourth cousin twice removed, and the daughter of Samuel Davenport Torrey, of Millbury, Massachusetts. They also had five children, one of whom died in infancy:

- Samuel Davenport Taft (February 7, 1855 – April 8, 1856)
- William Howard Taft (September 15, 1857 – March 8, 1930)
- Henry Waters Taft (May 27, 1859 – August 11, 1945)
- Horace Dutton Taft (December 28, 1861 – January 28, 1943)
- Frances Louise "Fanny" Taft (July 18, 1865 – January 4, 1950)

The estate of Alphonso Taft and his family, in Mount Auburn, one mile north of downtown Cincinnati, has been restored to its original appearance. It is open to the public and is now called the William Howard Taft National Historic Site.

== Cincinnati attorney and career ==
In 1845, Taft is credited with drafting what is still considered, the world's longest lease, a 10,000 year lease to be exact for the Mercantile Library of Cincinnati. In 1845, the library burned down and its members raised $10,000 to contribute to the rebuilding effort. In exchange for the monetary contribution from its members, Alphonso Taft using his legal prowess, as well as his sense of humor negotiated the 10,000 year lease from which the library was able to lease their space, and it also included a stipulation that the lease could be renewed. Alphonso Taft formed a law firm with Thomas Marshall Key and William M. Dickson in April 1854. He was a delegate to the Republican National Convention in 1856, and also that year made an unsuccessful run for the United States House of Representatives against George H. Pendleton. Taft supported the Union during the Civil War. He was a judge of the Superior Court of Cincinnati from 1866 to 1872 when he resigned to practice law with two of his sons. He was the first president of the Cincinnati Bar Association, serving in 1872.

In the court case Board of Education of Cincinnati vs. Minor (1872), Taft dissented against the decision made by the Superior Court of Cincinnati regarding the reading the Bible in public schools. Taft asserted that the school board was within its rights to stop the practice of reading the Bible in public schools, arguing that religious liberty demands that "The government is neutral, and, while protecting all [religious sects], it prefers none, and it disparages none." Taft's dissent helped to sway the Ohio Supreme Court, and they ruled in favor of the school board, overturning the Superior Court ruling. In his discourse, Taft specifically referenced Jewish groups opposed to the reading of the Bible in public schools. As taxpayers, Taft argued, Jews also had the right to take advantage of a public secular education. In addition, religion was a matter of the home and protected by the Bill of Rights. To suggest that the Bill of Rights only reflects Protestant values was inappropriate, according to Taft, as religious liberty was given to all religious denominations and Christianity "is not to be regarded as sectarian under our constitution."

Many believe that Taft's opinion was the cause of much opposition to him, and contributed to his 1875 loss of the Republican nomination for Governor of Ohio to Rutherford B. Hayes. However, the opinion that defeated his nomination was unanimously affirmed by the Supreme Court of Ohio. The independence of Taft's opinion commanded widespread respect, a sentiment freely expressed when President Ulysses S. Grant in March 1876 made him Secretary of War and three months later Attorney General of the United States.

Taft was elected a member of the American Antiquarian Society in October 1876.

== Secretary of War ==
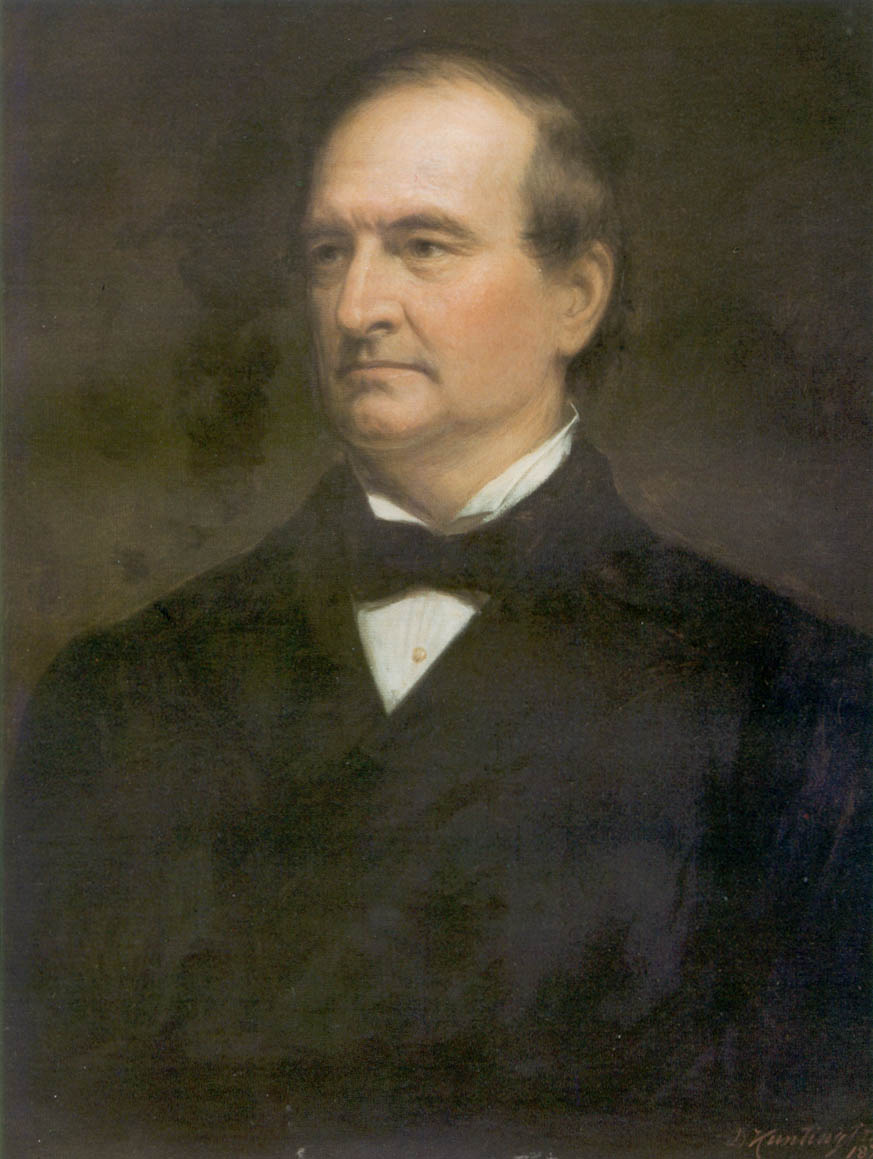
Secretary of War Alphonso Taft

When President Grant's secretary of war William W. Belknap resigned in 1876 over receiving profit money from the Fort Sill Indian tradership, Grant needed to find a replacement. Initially, Grant had Secretary George M. Robeson run both the War Department and the Navy Department. Robeson, however, had told Grant that the two Cabinet positions were difficult to manage by one person. Grant then asked Taft to be Secretary of War. With Belknap resigning in the shadow of scandal, Grant was under great pressure to find a reformer to replace him as Secretary of War. Taft had a good reputation as a lawyer and, importantly, was connected to business interests. After consultation, Taft accepted the position and was quickly confirmed by the Senate without objection, taking office on March 8, 1876. In light of what had come before, the press celebrated his appointment and confirmation.

Taft entered office with his "accustomed zeal and good judgment". He made a series of reforms to the War Department to restore its reputation and entanglements caused by Belknap's humiliating resignation. He reversed War Department policy by having commanders at U.S. military forts in the West, rather than the secretary of war, choose who would run post trader ships. Additionally, he worked with his friend, former general and sitting Ohio congressman Henry B. Banning, to make the army more efficient. He likewise ordered his Bureau and Commandant Department heads to lower their military expenditures. The old ways of letting things go under Belknap and Robeson, it seemed, were over under Taft.

Like his predecessor Belknap, Taft was a large man, with a compact frame, who commanded military respect and admiration while he was Secretary of War.

== U.S. attorney general ==
Grant appointed Taft U.S. attorney general after he had made a Cabinet shift by appointing Edwards Pierrepont Minister to England. Taft was replaced by J. Donald Cameron as Secretary of War. In October 1876, after the highly contested Hayes-Tilden presidential election, Attorney General Taft supported President Grant's use of the military in South Carolina and Mississippi to suppress violence against African Americans in the South. Taft gave a lengthy speech in New York outlining the atrocities committed by Southerners against blacks in the South. In order to prevent the U.S. from fighting a second civil war, Taft supported a bill, signed into law by Grant, that peacefully settled the 1876 election with an Electoral Commission.

== Bid for office ==
Taft was again an unsuccessful candidate for Governor of Ohio in 1879, this time against Charles Foster.

== U.S. Minister ==
Taft was appointed by President Chester A. Arthur as U.S. minister to Austria-Hungary (1882–1884) and to Imperial Russia (1884–1885).

== Family dynasty ==
Taft was a member of the Taft family political dynasty. His son, William Howard Taft, was the 27th president of the United States and the 10th Chief Justice of the United States, and was a member of Yale's Skull and Bones like his founder father; another son, Charles Phelps Taft, supported the founding of Wolf's Head Society at Yale; both his grandson and great-grandson, Robert A. Taft I (also Skull and Bones) and Robert Taft Jr., were U.S. Senators; his great-great-grandson, Robert A. Taft III, was the Governor of Ohio from 1999 until 2007. William Howard Taft III was ambassador to Ireland; William Howard Taft IV worked in several Republican administrations, most recently that of George W. Bush.

Alphonso Taft and his family were members of Cincinnati's First Congregational-Unitarian Church; he served as one of the congregation's trustees for many years, and was for a time the chairman of the board of trustees. Although government business kept him out of town and thus frequently away from the church in his later years, he remained in contact with the church's minister on the occasions that he was able to return to Cincinnati. At a famous 1874 Taft family reunion at Elmshade, at Uxbridge, Mass., Alphonso delivered an impassioned speech on his family history and his father's origins in this community, as recorded in his biography.

== Sources ==
=== Books ===
- Leonard, Lewis Alexander (1920). Life of Alphonso Taft. New York: Hawke Publishing Company (Incorporated).

=== Biographical dictionaries ===
- Pringle, Henry F. (1936). Dumas Malone (ed.). Dictionary of American Biography Taft, Alphonso. New York: Charles Scribner's Sons. pp. 264–265.

=== Newspapers ===
- "The Rebel War Claims Speech of Hon. Alphonso Taft". The New York Times. October 26, 1876.

Political offices
Preceded by William W. Belknap	U.S. Secretary of War; Served under: Ulysses S. Grant; March 8, 1876 – May 22, 1876	Succeeded by J. Donald Cameron
Legal offices
Preceded by Edwards Pierrepont	U.S. Attorney General; Served under: Ulysses S. Grant; May 22, 1876 – March 4, 1877	Succeeded by Charles Devens
Diplomatic posts
Preceded by William Walter Phelps	United States Ambassador to Austria-Hungary; April 22, 1882 – August 25, 1884	Succeeded by John M. Francis
