= Hessy Levinsons Taft =

German Jew used in Nazi propaganda as a child (1934–2026)

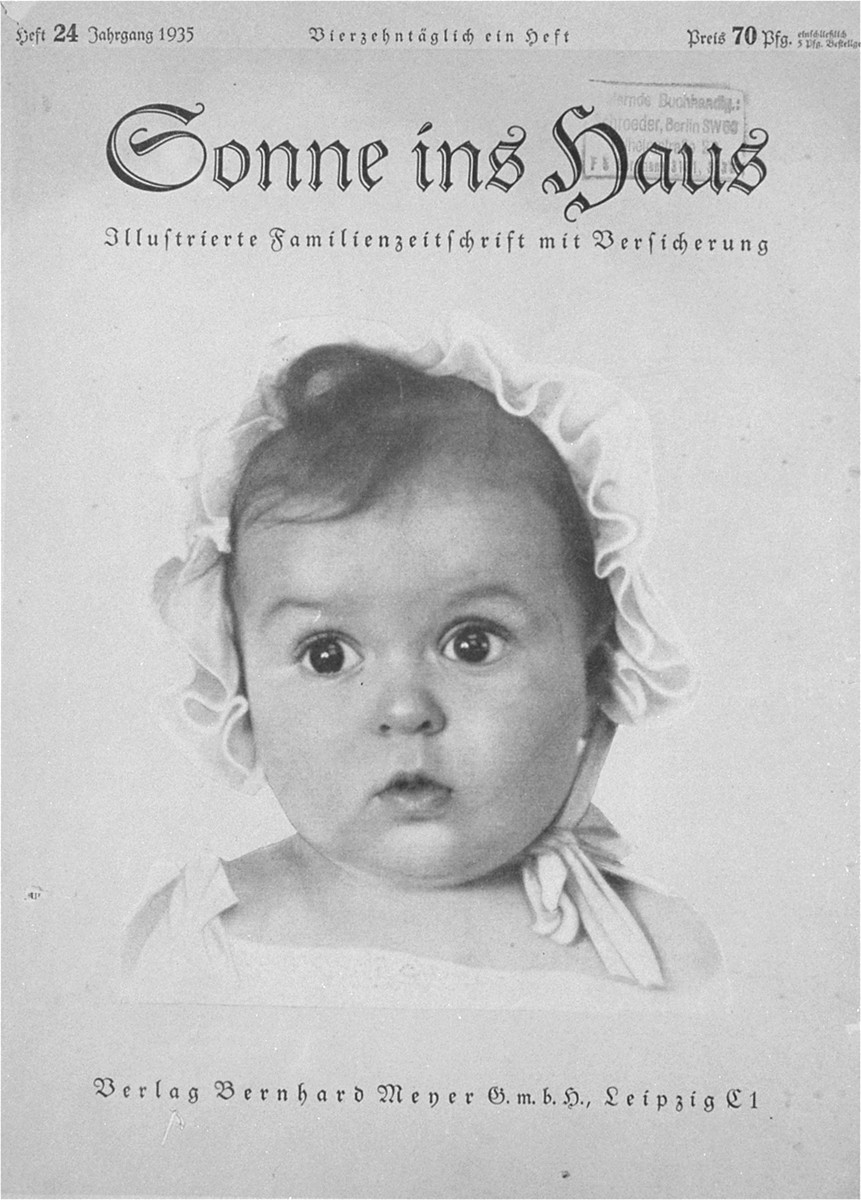
- Hessy Levinsons as featured in Nazi propaganda materials
- Born: Hessy Lewinsohn; 17 May 1934; Berlin, Germany
- Died: 1 January 2026 (aged 91); San Francisco, California, U.S.
- Education: Barnard College (BA); Columbia University (PhD)
- Occupation: Chemistry professor
- Known for: Jewish child whose photo was featured in Nazi Germany as the "Perfect Aryan Baby"
- Spouse: Earl Taft
- Children: 2

Hessy Levinsons Taft (born Hessy Lewinsohn; 17 May 1934 – 1 January 2026) was a German Jew who was featured as an infant in Nazi propaganda after her photo won a contest to find "the most beautiful Aryan baby" in 1935. Taft's image was subsequently distributed widely by the Nazi Party in a variety of materials, such as magazines and postcards, to promote Aryanism.

== Photograph ==
Hessy Lewinsohn was born in Berlin, Nazi Germany on 17 May 1934. Her Ashkenazi Jewish parents, Jacob Lewinsohn and Pauline Lewinsohn (née Levine), were opera singers originally from Latvia. (The family's surname was later changed to Levinsons.) Unaware that their daughter's photographer had entered the photograph into the contest, they accidentally learned that it had been selected by Nazi Propaganda Minister Joseph Goebbels as the winner.

Fearing that the Nazis would discover that their family was Jewish, Pauline Lewinsohn demanded that the photographer explain the situation. The photographer, Hans Ballin, told her that he knew they were Jewish and deliberately entered Hessy Lewinsohn's photograph into the contest because he "wanted to make the Nazis ridiculous". In July 2014, Taft told the German-language newspaper Bild that "I can laugh about it now, but if the Nazis had known who I really was, I wouldn't be alive."

== Later life and death ==
In 1937, the family returned to Latvia, keeping the story of the photo a secret to protect themselves from retribution. In 1938, Jacob Levinsons was briefly arrested by the SS. In the same year, the family migrated to France and settled in Paris. After the Nazis occupied Paris in 1940, they fled to Nice and then to Cuba. In 1949, they moved to New York City.

Hessy Levinsons studied chemistry at Julia Richman High School in New York, and majored in chemistry at Barnard College, graduating in 1955. As a graduate student in chemistry at Columbia University, she met her husband, mathematics instructor Earl Taft. She and her husband joined the faculty at Rutgers University, but she left academia to raise a family, later working on the AP Chemistry exam for the Educational Testing Service (ETS).

After 30 years at ETS, she returned to New York as a chemistry professor at St. John's University in 2000. Her research in this later period of life focused on water sustainability. She retired in 2016.

Taft died at her home in San Francisco, on 1 January 2026, at the age of 91.

== See also ==
- Werner Goldberg – soldier with partial Jewish ancestry also used in Nazi propaganda
