= Taft–West Warehouse =

- Taft-West Warehouse
- U.S. National Register of Historic Places
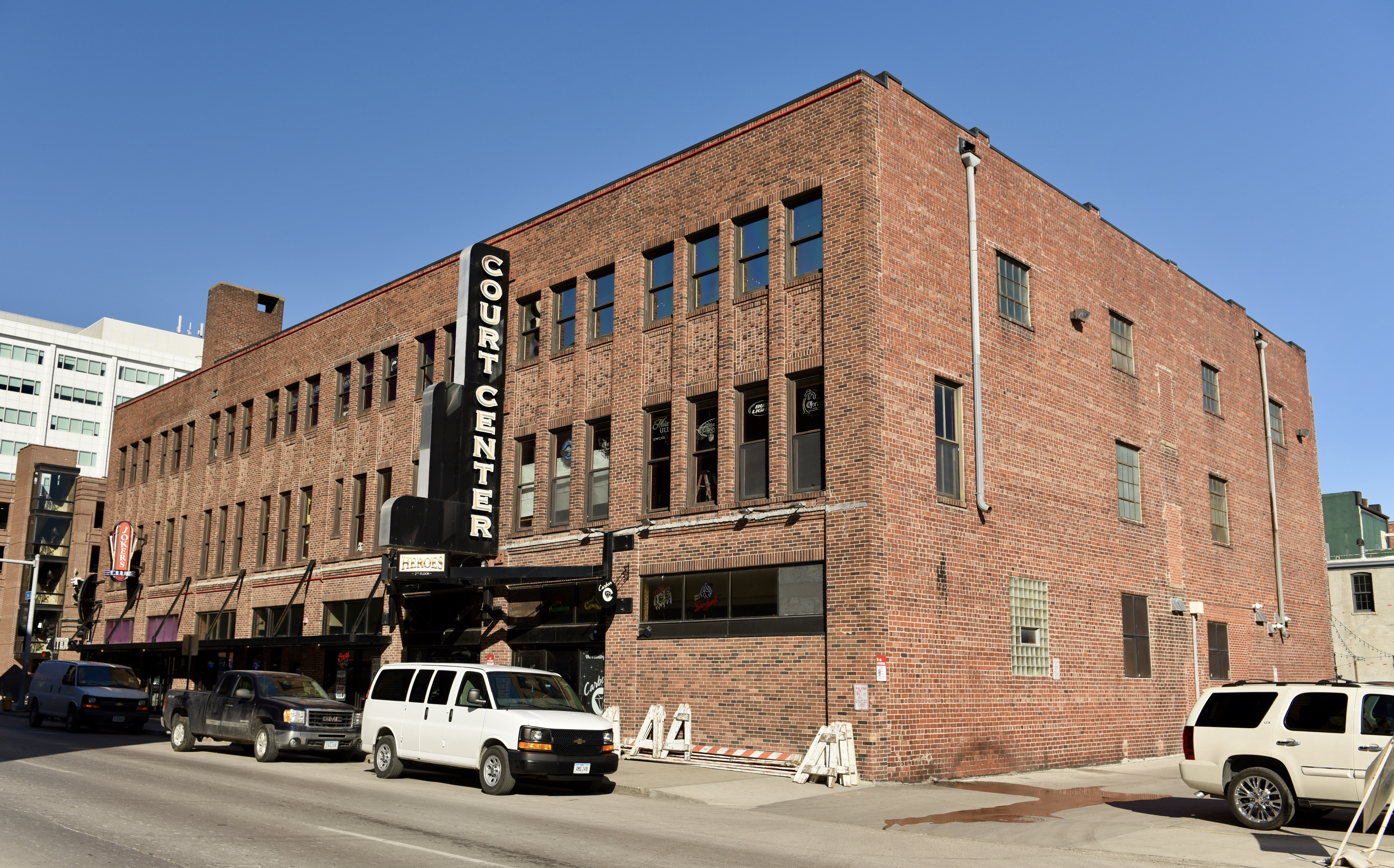

- Location within Iowa Location within the United States
- Location: 216-222 Court Ave. Des Moines, Iowa
- Coordinates: 41°35′06.3″N 93°37′12″W
- Area: less than one acre
- Built: 1923
- Architect: Vorse, Kraetsch, & Kraetsch
- Architectural style: Early Commercial; Art Deco
- NRHP reference No.: 06001162
- Added to NRHP: December 20, 2006

The Taft–West Warehouse, also known as the C.C. Taft Company Building, Plumb Supply Company, Ben's Furniture Warehouse, and Nacho Mamma's, is a historic building located in Des Moines, Iowa, United States. Completed in 1923, this three-story brick structure was built during a transitional period between the dominance of railroads the emergence of trucks servicing warehouses. It was designed by local architectural firm of Vorse, Kraetsch, & Kraetsch. It features cleans lines of the Commercial style as opposed to the fussiness of late Victorian styling that was dominant in a great deal of the city's commercial architecture. The building was also located in the Court Avenue wholesale district, and now it is only one of only five or six that remain extant. The building was constructed for the C.C. Taft Company. This firm and the O.B. West Company that succeeded it in this building, dealt in wholesale fruits, vegetables, candy and tobacco. The building was listed on the National Register of Historic Places in 2006.
