= William Howard Taft National Historic Site =

National Historic Site of the United States

- U.S. National Register of Historic Places
- U.S. National Historic Landmark
- U.S. National Historic Site
- U.S. Historic district – Contributing property
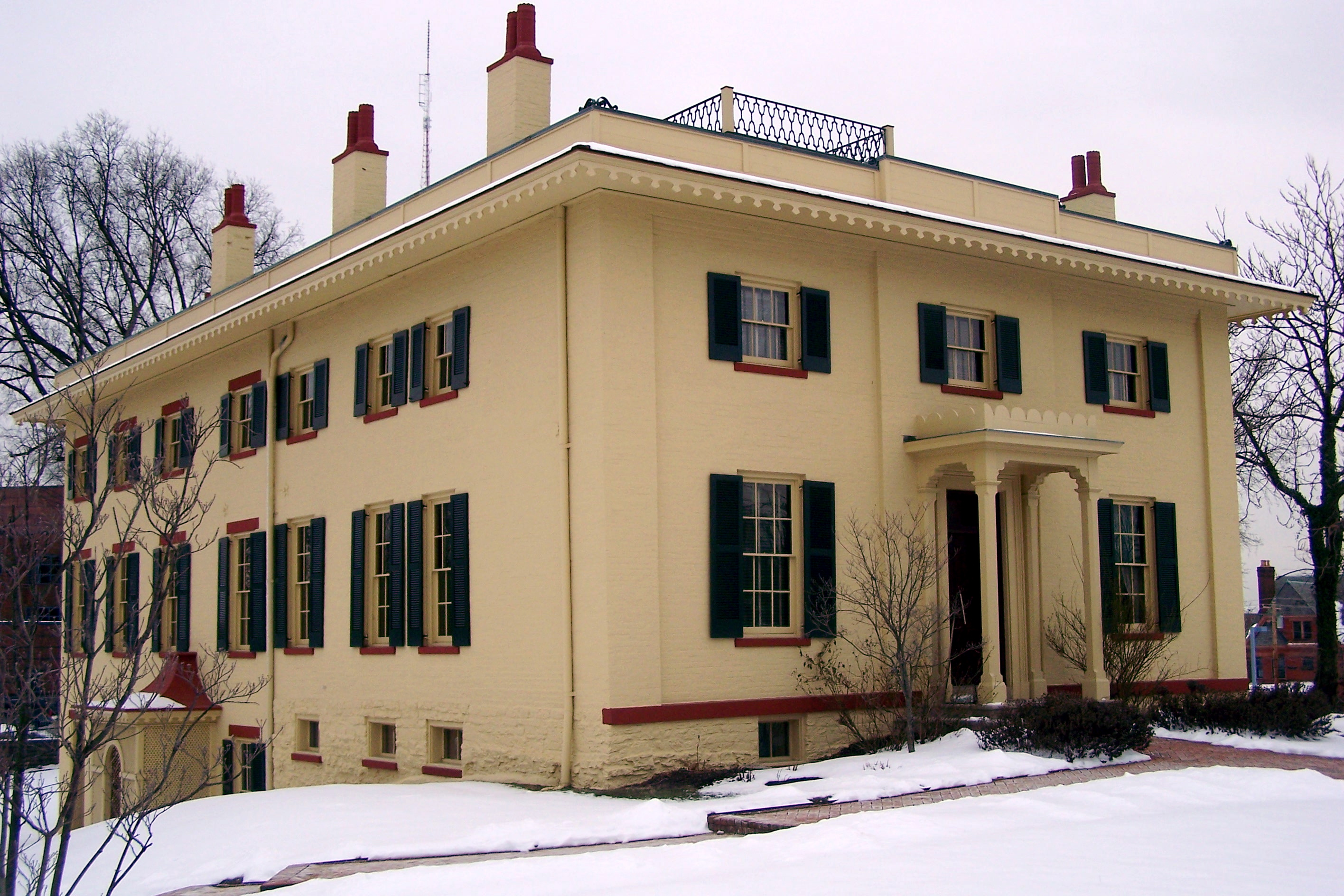
- Taft House in 2007

- Location within Ohio Location within the United States
- Interactive map showing the William Howard Taft National Historic Site’s location
- Location: 2038 Auburn Avenue, Cincinnati, Ohio
- Coordinates: 39°7′11″N 84°30′31″W
- Area: 3 acres (12,140 m²)
- Built: 1842
- Architectural style: Greek Revival
- Visitation: 18,121 (2025)
- Website: William Howard Taft National Historic Site
- Part of: Mount Auburn Historic District (ID73001464)
- NRHP reference No.: 66000612 (original); 15000753 (increase)

Significant dates
- Added to NRHP: October 15, 1966
- Boundary increase: October 21, 2015
- Designated NHL: January 29, 1964
- Designated NHS: December 2, 1969
- Designated CP: March 28, 1973

William Howard Taft National Historic Site is a historic house at 2038 Auburn Avenue in the Mount Auburn Historic District of Cincinnati, Ohio, a mile (1.6 km) north of Downtown. It was the birthplace and childhood home of William Howard Taft, the 27th president and the 10th chief justice of the United States. It is a two-story Greek Revival house built circa 1845.

== History ==
William Howard Taft's father, Alphonso Taft, came to Cincinnati from Vermont in 1838 to establish a law practice. He moved his family to this house a little over a decade later. Alphonso Taft became an early supporter of the Republican Party in Cincinnati. He lived in this house with his family and parents. He would eventually serve as the 31st United States Secretary of War and the 34th United States Attorney General. Subsequent to serving in those positions, Taft also served as United States Minister to Austria-Hungary, being appointed to this position in 1882 and in 1884, serving as United States Minister to Russia until 1885. Wikilinks

The house is believed to have been built in the early 1840s, between 1844 and 1847 by a family named Hopkins. Alphonso bought the house at 60 Auburn Street (now 2038 Auburn Avenue), with its accompanying 1.82 acres, for $10,100 on June 13, 1851. Mount Auburn was once a popular area to live for upper-class Cincinnatians, as it allowed those of higher incomes to escape the sweltering heat and humidity of downtown Cincinnati summers. The Taft residence, a Greek Revival domicile, was relatively modest compared to other nearby residences, which were a mix of Second Empire, Italianate, and Georgian Revival.

Alphonso's wife Fanny Phelps Taft died a year after the family moved to the Mount Auburn residence, in June 1852. In December 1853 Alphonso remarried, choosing a schoolteacher from Massachusetts named Louise Torrey. Louise Taft would give birth to their second child, William Howard Taft, in the house on September 15, 1857, presumably in the first-floor nursery in the rear ell. (The first child had died at age fourteen months from whooping cough.) Alphonso had six children living in the house, two by Fanny (three others had died beforehand) and four by Louise.

The house was used for social events. Visitors included many local and state dignitaries, including future President James A. Garfield. Rugs in the parlor were often rolled up for dancing. Family activities took place in the library; Alphonso was an avid book collector.

William would live in the house until he went to Yale University in 1874. Afterward, the Taft family would spend less time in the house, starting when Alphonso served in the Ulysses S. Grant administration. In 1877 a fire damaged the second floor and roof. Alphonso and Louise would lease the house in 1889, moving to California because the climate was thought to be beneficial for those with declining health. William had married in 1886, and the rest of the Taft sons had moved out by this point as well. In May 1891 Alphonso died in San Diego, California, and was buried in Cincinnati; the tenants of the Auburn house allowed the mourners to gather at the house for the funeral. Louise eventually was able to sell the house outright, after ten years of trying, in 1899 to Judge Albert C. Thompson, after returning to her home town of Millbury, Massachusetts, to live with her sister.

== Post-Taft ownership ==
Within five years of the house leaving the Taft family, the front veranda was removed, replaced by a one-story porch. Other modifications were the addition of a conservatory and the demolition of outbuildings, including a stable. Upon Thompson's death the house was sold by his widow to Colonel Ernest H. Ruffner in 1912. Upon Ruffner's death it was sold by his daughter. The William Howard Taft Memorial Association was formed on July 7, 1937, in hopes of buying the property, but went without support of the Taft family, as Robert Taft thought it would look too opportunistic to memorialize the house his father grew up in, and thus failed in acquiring the $12,000 to buy it. In the 1940s the building was used as apartments, with the new owner Elbert R. Bellinger once considering selling it to become a funeral parlor for local blacks. Taft family political fortunes faltered with Robert's death in 1953, and with Charles Phelps Taft II available to spearhead the movement, the William Howard Taft Memorial Association eventually acquired the house for $35,000 (the assessment price), instead of the $75,000 Bellinger was demanding for it.

By 1961, the house was in poor condition and needed restoration, to the tune of $92,500. It was declared a National Historic Landmark in 1964. A ceremony on September 15, 1964 (William's 107th birthday), celebrated the home becoming a National Historic Landmark.

The association gained full title to the house in 1968 and in 1969 transferred it to the National Park Service, which currently operates the site as a historic house museum, so that its future upkeep is ensured. The United States government took the property title on November 1, 1970.

Letters and diary entries written by Louise Taft during her time in the home helped preservationists to return the domicile to how it appeared during William's childhood.

== Today ==
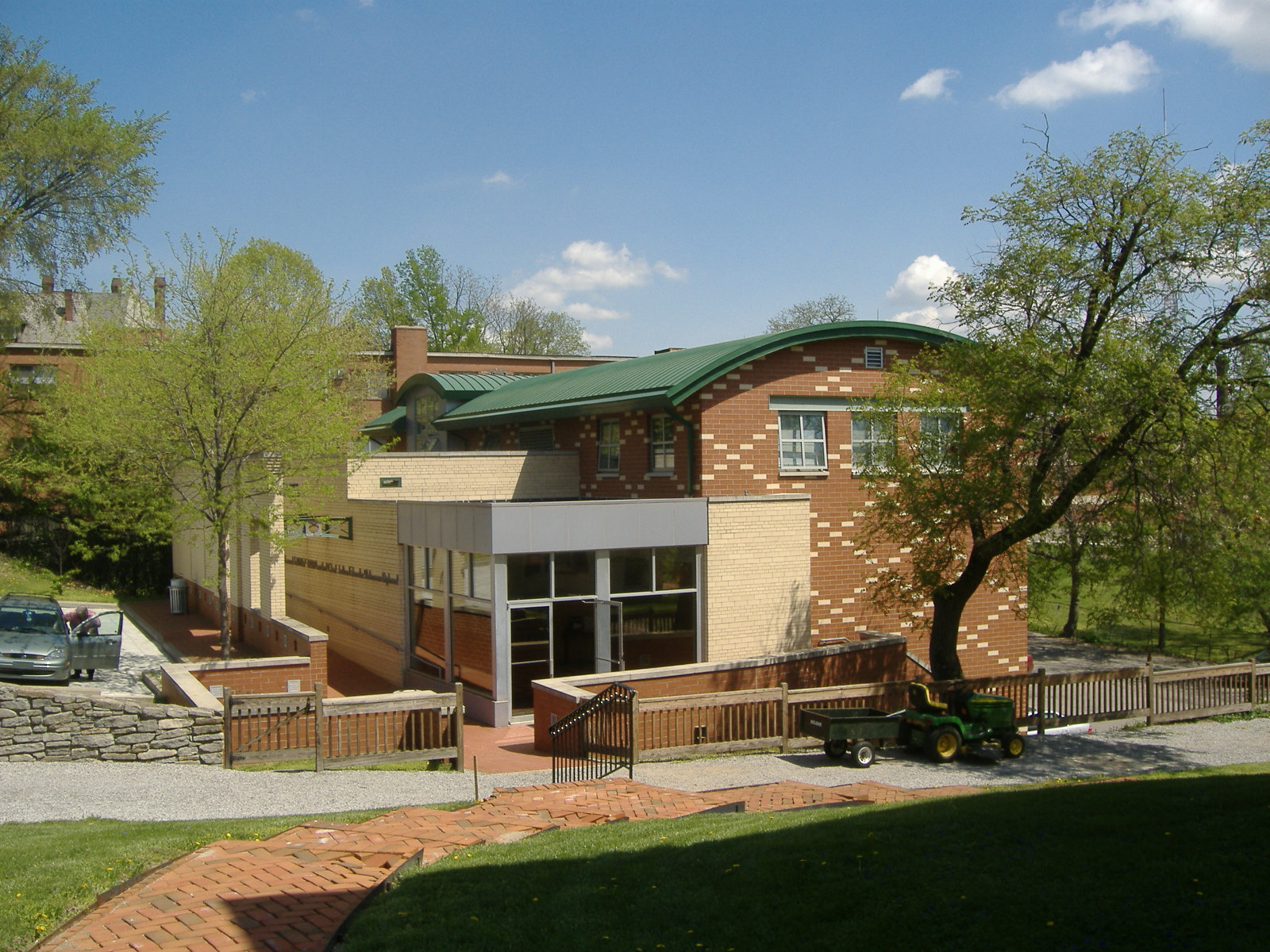
Visitor center/Taft Education Center

William Howard Taft National Historic Site has two main buildings. The first is the original home owned by William Howard Taft's parents, Alphonso and Louise Taft. It has been restored to look as it did during the time William lived there. All the family portraits and many of the books on display belonged to the Taft family. The first floor has five rooms restored: William's birthplace, and four rooms representative of the period. The furniture is period pieces and did not necessarily belong to the Tafts. The second floor contains exhibits on the accomplishments of William.

The second building is the National Historic Site's Visitor Center, officially called the Taft Education Center. It has offices, a National Park giftshop, an audio-animatronic exhibit of William's son Charles Phelps Taft II fishing and telling stories about his father and other members of the Taft family, and a short biographical film on William Howard Taft.

== See also ==
- Taft Museum of Art
- List of residences of presidents of the United States
- Presidential memorials in the United States
