= Louise Taft =

Mother of U.S. President William Howard Taft (1827–1907)

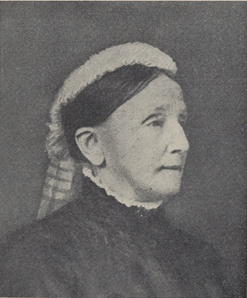
- Born: 11 September 1827
- Died: 8 December 1907
- Children: 5, including William Howard Taft, Henry Waters Taft, and Horace Dutton Taft

Louisa Maria "Louise" Torrey (September 11, 1827 – December 8, 1907) was the second wife of Alphonso Taft, and the mother of U.S. President William Howard Taft.

== Background ==
She was born in Boston, Massachusetts, the first daughter of Samuel Davenport Torrey (1789–1877) and his second wife, the former Susan Holman Waters (1803–1866). Her three sisters were Delia Chapin Torrey, Anna Davenport Torrey (who married geologist Edward Orton, Sr.), and Susan H. Torrey. She graduated from Mount Holyoke College (then Mount Holyoke Female Seminary) in 1845.

From 1846 to 1858, she intermittently published The Yale Gallinipper, a "scathingly satirical" Yale newspaper with Olivia Day (daughter of Jeremiah Day) and Henrietta Blake (descendant of Eli Whitney). The three women wrote anonymously, pretending to be "three brothers" who were undergraduates at Yale. They were known for their hard-hitting criticisms of the students, faculty, and the Yale Literary Magazine.

== Marriage and family life ==
She married Alphonso Taft, widowed in 1852, on December 26, 1853 in Millbury, Massachusetts, becoming stepmother to his two living sons by his first wife, Fanny Phelps: Charles Phelps Taft, who became the publisher of the Cincinnati Times-Star and was a member of the U.S. House of Representatives from 1895 to 1897, and Peter Rawson "Rossy" Taft.

They had five children, four of whom lived to adulthood. The first, who died aged 14 months of pertussis, was Samuel Davenport Torrey Taft. The second was President William Howard Taft; next was Henry Waters Taft, who became a lawyer in New York City; fourth was Horace Dutton Taft, founder of the Taft School in Watertown, Connecticut, and the last was Frances Louis "Fanny" Taft, who married surgeon William A. Edwards.

The family lived in Cincinnati during her husband's tenure as judge of the Superior Court of Cincinnati. Then in Washington, D. C. when he served successively as Secretary of War and Attorney General. Also, in Austria-Hungary and Russia when he served as U.S. ambassador to each country.

== Death ==
Louise Taft died at Millbury, Massachusetts, aged 80 years, and was interred at Spring Grove Cemetery in Cincinnati, Ohio. Less than one year later, her eldest surviving son was elected President.
