= Taft Hotel =

Taft Hotel may refer to:

- Taft Hotel (New Haven)
- The Michelangelo, formerly the Hotel Taft
- Hotel Ramapo
