= Robert Taft (chemist and author) =

American chemist and historian (1894–1955)

- Born: March 24, 1894; Tokyo, Japan
- Died: September 22, 1955 (aged 61); Lawrence, Kansas, U.S.
- Occupations: Professor, writer, photographer
- Title: Professor of chemistry
- Parent(s): George and Jessie Taft

Academic background
- Education: Grand Island College (A.B.); University of Iowa (M.S.); University of Kansas (Ph.D)
- Thesis: Oxidation and Reduction (1925)
- Doctoral advisor: H. P. Cady

Academic work
- Discipline: Chemistry
- Sub-discipline: Physical chemistry
- Institutions: University of Kansas

Robert Taft (March 24, 1894 – September 22, 1955) was a professor of chemistry at the University of Kansas. He was known for his contributions to American studies, including photography and Western art and illustrations. His two books in these fields were Photography and the American Scene (1938) and Artists and Illustrators of the Old West (1953). The historian Bernard DeVoto said of Taft: "For one man to produce two books so original and fundamental, so comprehensive, so authoritative, and I may add so delightful—surely this is one of the most remarkable scholarly achievements in our time." Taft's extensive papers, documenting the research he did in all fields, were donated by his children to the Kansas Historical Society. His personal papers, especially relating to his Mt. Oread books, are at the Kenneth Spencer Research Library, University of Kansas.

== Personal life ==
Robert Taft was born on March 24, 1894, in Tokyo, Japan. For the first three years of his life, he remained in Japan, where his parents were serving as missionaries, but when he was three, his family moved to Rochester, New York. He earned an undergraduate degree in history at Grand Island College (1916) and a master's degree from the University of Iowa (1919). In 1925, he earned a Ph.D. in chemistry from the University of Kansas (KU); his doctoral dissertation was titled "Oxidation and Reduction". From c. 1919 until 1922, Taft lived and taught in Ottawa, Kansas before he was hired to teach at KU. In 1937, he was promoted to professor, a capacity in which he served, according to the Kenneth Spencer Research Library, until his demise in 1955.

== Academic career ==
Taft's field was physical chemistry with a special interest in the electrodeposition of metals. He served as president of the Kansas Academy of Science from 1941 until his death and also served as editor of its publication, Transactions.

== Mount Oread and Kansas history ==
The University of Kansas, in Lawrence, Kansas, is built upon a hill, locally known as Mt. Oread. Taft ascertained that the location had been a stop on the Oregon Trail. Based on this theory, he wrote, first, Across the Years at Mt. Oread in 1941, and then revised it as The Years at Mt. Oread, which was published in 1955.

Taft also wrote various papers about the history of Kansas. During 1952 and 1953, he served as the president of the Kansas State Historical Society. The following year he served as chairman of the Kansas Territorial Centennial Commission.

== Photography ==
Taft's book Photography and the American Scene: a Social History 1838–1889 was among the first books to cover the early years of photography in the United States. Taft's interest in the photography developed from his knowledge of chemistry and the mechanism of daguerreotypes, and this is evident in the book's detailed technical explanations of the science of photography. Taft also attributed his interest in this field (and American art more generally) to his early reading of an account of John C. Fremont's western explorations.

In various chapters, the book details the science and art of daguerreotypes, tintypes, carte de visites, stereographs, and more modern developments. To write the book and make the careful analyses he did, Taft relied upon extensive research. All Taft's research was conducted in the old-fashioned way of writing letters to people and museums all over the country, reading old newspapers, and making visits to various document depositories around the country. All of this work appears as hundreds of footnotes in the book. In fact, more than half of the writing in the book is in the footnotes. Many of these notes describe Taft's process of obtaining photographs and associated documents; e.g., how he wrote to the widow or children of some photographer, and was able to obtain original letters or photos, which allowed him to make substantiated statements.

Francois Brunet, Professor of Art and Literature of the United States at the Paris Diderot University, praised Taft's work as grass-roots historical research.

== Early western art ==
Taft's Artists and Illustrators of the Old West, 1850–1900, published in 1953, was a significant contribution to research and knowledge on the subject.

This book concentrated on those artists who traveled to an as-yet largely unsettled West to create observational drawings from life. The book is illustrated with works by the artists that Taft discusses. Being a scientist, he often explains the process by which an original drawing was reproduced. This is especially interesting when various publications after the Civil War, such as Harpers Weekly, had drawings transferred onto wood blocks for printing.

Taft devotes chapters to little-known illustrators, such as Frenzeny, Tavenier, Möllhausen, and Zaugbaum, praising those artists who actually witnessed the scenes they portrayed, and presented it as accurately and in detail as possible. They should as well, he says, be competent draftsmen.

Taft used the same techniques as in the photography book—doing primary research, contacting relatives of the artists, tracing down pictures in out-of-the way libraries, and scanning old newspapers in western towns. And, once again, the footnotes exceed the text by volume. It is these notes that later historians and artists have turned to in the intervening years, for information which might otherwise have been lost. Many of the chapters of this book appeared as separate articles before the appearance of the book. For authorship of this book, Taft was awarded the Byron Caldwell Smith award, from the University of Kansas.

== Selected bibliography ==
- Across the Years at Mt. Oread (1941)
- Photography and the American Scene: a Social History 1838–1889 (1942)
- Artists and Illustrators of the Old West, 1850–1900 (1953)
- The Years at Mt. Oread (1955)
