= Aaron Taft House =

Historic house in Massachusetts, United States

- U.S. National Register of Historic Places
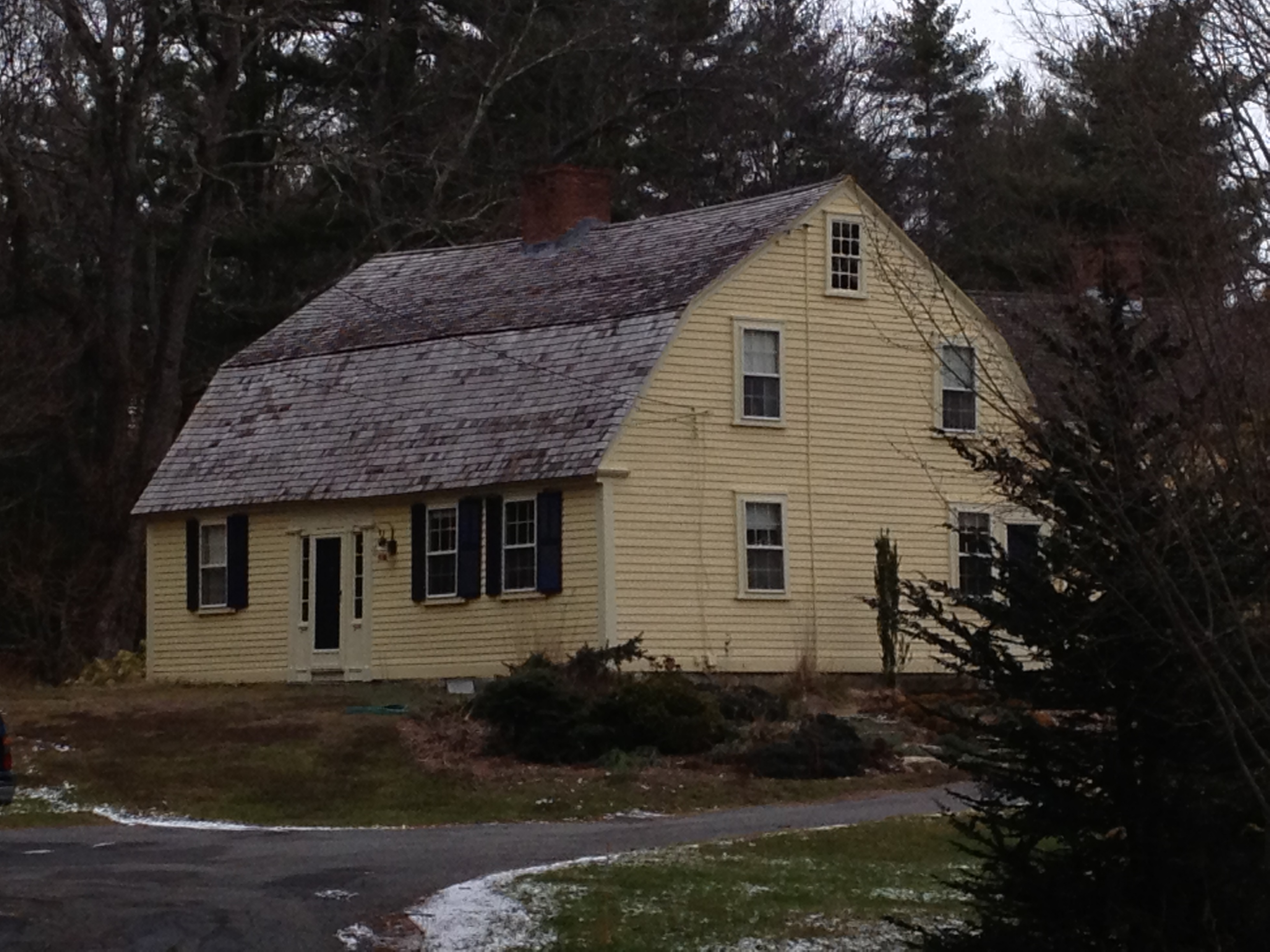

- Location within Massachusetts Location within the United States
- Location: Uxbridge, Massachusetts
- Coordinates: 42°4′47″N 71°39′7″W
- MPS: Uxbridge MRA
- NRHP reference No.: 83004134
- Added to NRHP: October 7, 1983

The Aaron Taft House is an historic house at 215 Hazel Street, in Uxbridge, Massachusetts, United States. Built about 1749, it is one of five surviving gambrel-roofed 18th-century houses in the town. It is 1 1/2 stories in height, with a side-gabled gambrel roof, clapboard siding, and central chimney. The main facade is asymmetrical, with three window bays, one to the left of the entrance, which is off center, and is adorned with sidelight windows, pilasters, and a simple entablature. It was the birthplace in 1785 of Peter Rawson Taft, the grandfather of President William Howard Taft.

On October 7, 1983, it was added to the National Register of Historic Places.

== See also ==
- Taft family
- National Register of Historic Places listings in Uxbridge, Massachusetts
