= Taft High School =

Taft High School may refer to:

- Taft School in Watertown, Connecticut, founded by Horace Dutton Taft, William Howard Taft's brother

Schools named after William Howard Taft:

- William Howard Taft High School (Los Angeles)
- William Howard Taft High School (Chicago)
- William Howard Taft High School (New York City)
- William Howard Taft High School (San Antonio)

Other schools:

- Taft Union High School Taft, California
- Robert A. Taft Information Technology High School, also known as Taft High School, Cincinnati, Ohio, named for Robert A. Taft
- Taft High School (Lincoln City, Oregon), named for the former community of Taft, Oregon, which was named for William Howard Taft
- Taft High School (Texas), named after the community of Taft, Texas, which was named after Charles Taft

== See also ==
- Taft (disambiguation)
