= Horace Dutton Taft =

American educator (1861–1943)

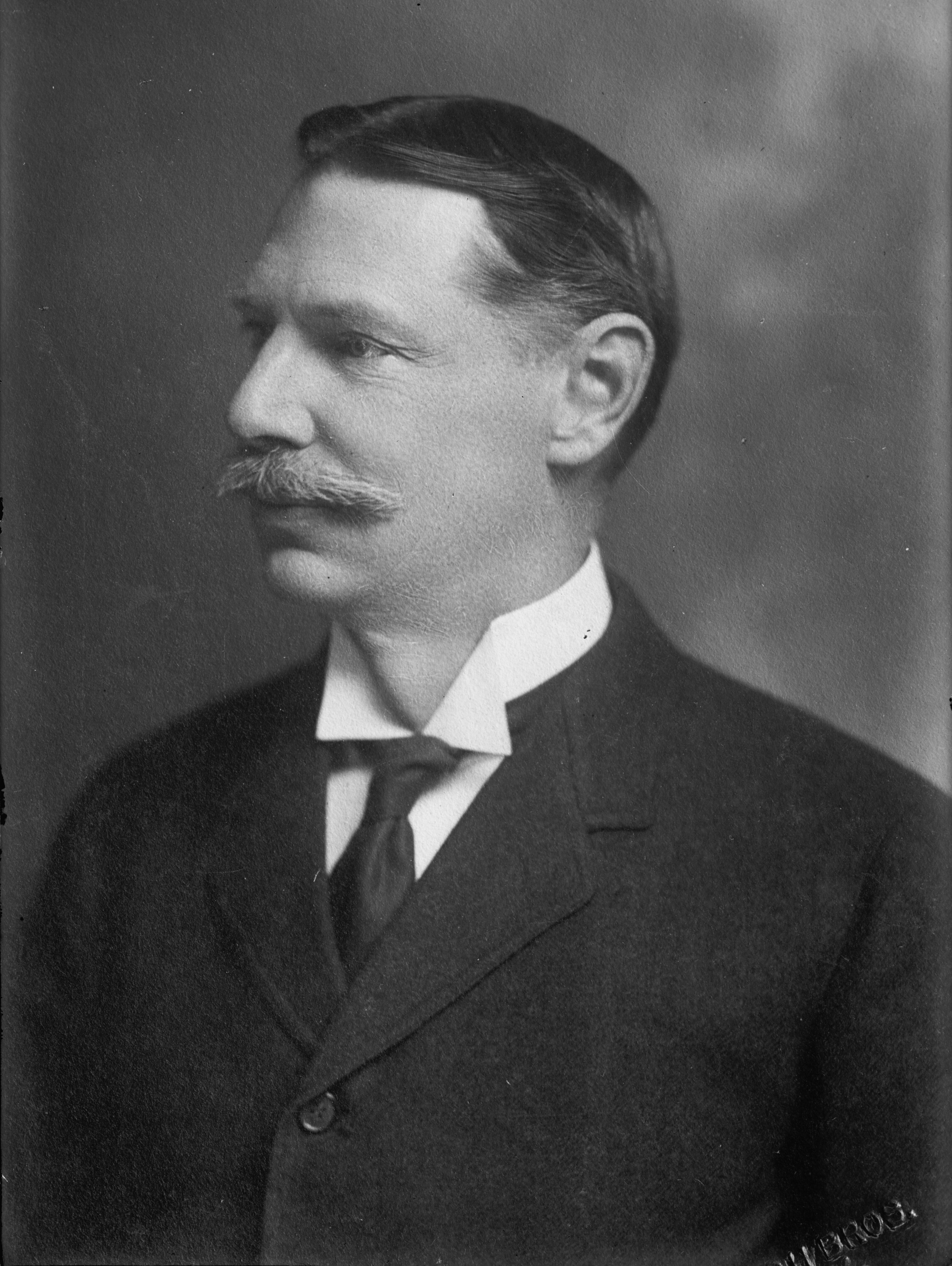
- Taft in 1900
- Born: December 28, 1861; Cincinnati, Ohio, U.S.
- Died: January 28, 1943 (aged 81); Watertown, Connecticut, U.S.
- Education: Yale University (BA); Cincinnati Law School
- Spouse: Winifred Shepard Thompson (m. 1892; died 1909)
- Parent(s): Alphonso Taft; Louise Torrey
- Relatives: William Howard Taft (brother); Henry Waters Taft (brother)

Horace Dutton Taft (December 28, 1861 – January 28, 1943) was an American educator, and the founder of The Taft School in Watertown, Connecticut, United States.

== Early life ==
He was born in Cincinnati, Ohio, the younger brother of William Howard Taft of the powerful Taft family. He graduated from Yale University in 1883, where he was a member of Skull and Bones and won the Townsend Prize.

He went on to Cincinnati Law School, but passed the bar after his second year and practiced law briefly at a firm with his father Alphonso Taft. Knowing he preferred education, he returned to Yale to tutor Latin.

== Career ==
In 1890 he opened a college preparatory school for boys in Pelham Manor, New York. In 1893 he moved his school to Watertown, Connecticut, purchasing the Warren House, a Civil War-era hotel, and adopting the name The Taft School in 1898. By 1913, the school had outgrown the hotel, and Mr. Taft commissioned the first permanent campus building, a collegiate Gothic castle known as HDT, after Horace Dutton Taft and designed by architect Bertram Goodhue, with landscape architecture by Frederick Law Olmsted Jr. The second major structure, completed in 1931, was designed by James Gamble Rogers and was named CPT after Horace Taft's brother Charles Phelps Taft, who was a major contributor to the Taft School.

Taft retired as headmaster in 1936, but continued to teach a course in Civics until his death. In 1942, Taft's memoir was published, entitled Memories and Opinions.

== Personal life ==
On June 29, 1892, he married Winifred Shepard Thompson, an art teacher at a New Haven high school who was originally from Buffalo, New York. She died of cancer in 1909. There were no children of the marriage. He had a lifelong friendship with Sherman Day Thacher, founder of The Thacher School; the two met while both attending Yale in the 1880s and exchanged letters throughout their lives.

== Death ==
Taft died at his home in Watertown, Connecticut on January 28, 1943.
