= Taft Law School =

Online law school based in Santa Ana, California

- Parent school: William Howard Taft University
- Established: 1984
- School type: Private for-profit online law school
- Dean: Melody Jolly
- Location: Santa Ana, California, United States
- Bar pass rate: 9% (1/11) (2023)
- Website: www.taftu.edu

Taft Law School is a private for-profit online law school in Santa Ana, California. It was founded in 1976 and operates through the Taft University System (William Howard Taft University). The school offers a Juris Doctor (J.D.) program.

Although the school is accredited by the Distance Education Accrediting Commission, it is not accredited by the American Bar Association or by the State Bar of California. The Law School Admission Council explains that most states do not "permit graduates of these schools to take the bar examination" nor "admit to their bars a graduate of a non-ABA-approved law school." The California State Bar Committee of Bar Examiners categorizes Taft Law School as a "registered unaccredited correspondence law school." As such, its graduates must pass the First-Year Law Students' Examination, also known as the 'baby bar', in order to be eligible to take the California General Bar Examination.

The Committee of Bar Examiners classifies distance education law schools into two categories: "registered unaccredited distance learning law schools" and "registered unaccredited correspondence law schools". By rule, a "registered unaccredited distance-learning law school" must require that students participate in not less than 135 hours of synchronous (live) interactive classes per year.

== Bar pass rates ==
Since 2021, Taft Law School has had 10 or fewer students sit for the California Bar, except for the July 2023 exam, when 11 students took the bar and 1 passed, for a pass rate of 9 percent.

== Notable alumni ==
- ED Denson (1999), music industry executive and attorney
- Jonathan Falwell (2005), senior pastor at Thomas Road Baptist Church and son of Jerry Falwell
- Jim Rice (J.D.), former member of the Idaho Senate
- Orly Taitz (2002), conspiracy theorist and lawyer for the birther movement
