= Governor Taft =

Governor Taft may refer to:

- Bob Taft (born January 8, 1942), 67th Governor of Ohio
- Royal C. Taft (1823–1912), 39th Governor of Rhode Island
- William Howard Taft (1857–1930), Governor-General of the Philippines and Cuba
