= Senator Taft (disambiguation) =

Robert A. Taft (1889–1953) was the U.S. Senator from Ohio from 1939 to 1953. Senator Taft may also refer to:

- Bezaleel Taft Jr. (1780–1846), Massachusetts State Senate
- Bezaleel Taft Sr. (1750–1839), Massachusetts State Senate
- James L. Taft Jr. (1930–2011), Rhode Island State Senate
- Kingsley A. Taft (1903–1970), Ohio State Senate
- Robert Taft Jr. (1917–1993), Ohio State Senate
- Russell S. Taft (1835–1902), Vermont State Senate
- William W. Taft (born 1932), Ohio State Senate
