= Moses Taft House (Uxbridge, Massachusetts) =

Historic house in Massachusetts, United States

- U.S. National Register of Historic Places
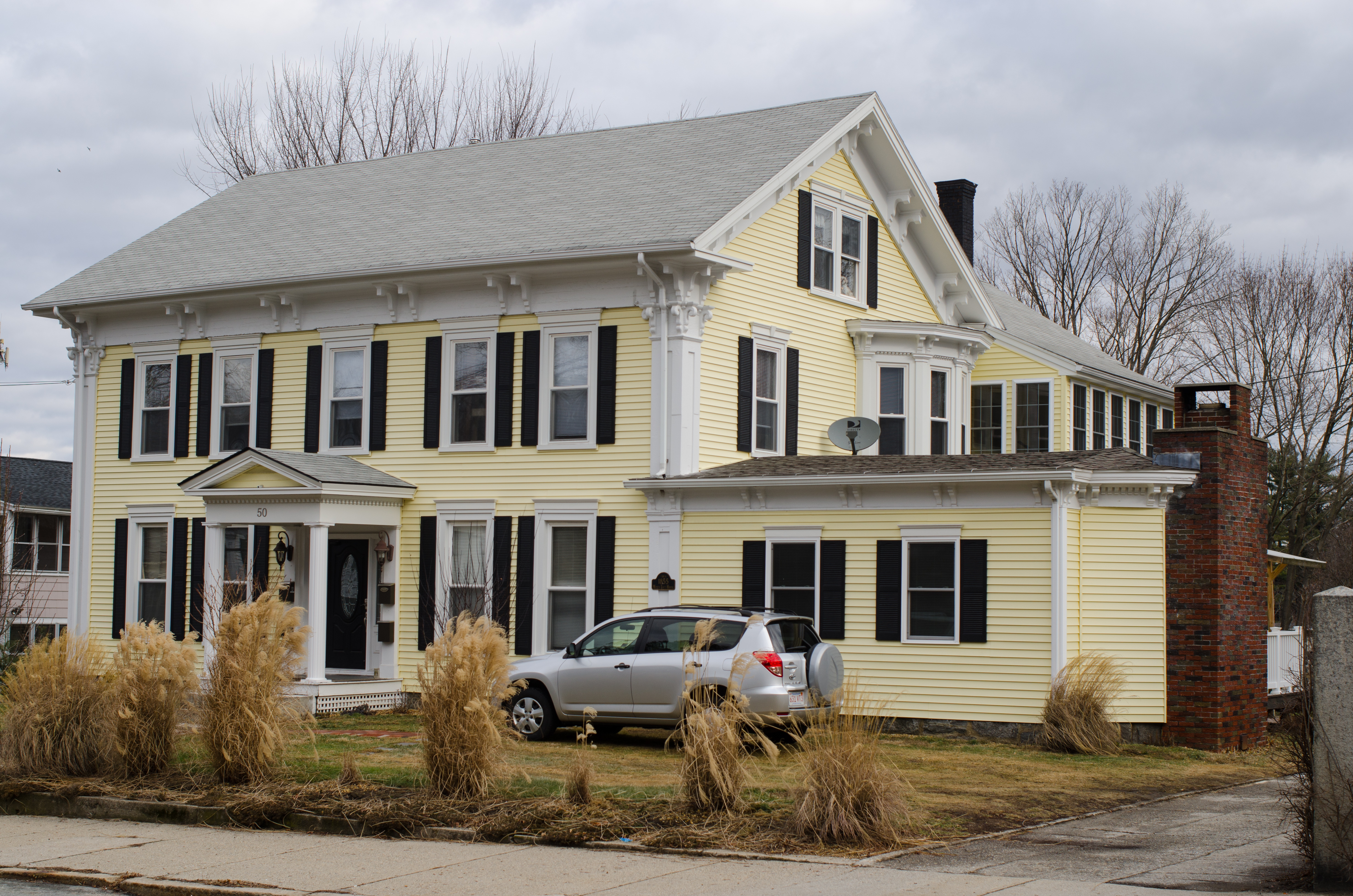

- Location within Massachusetts Location within the United States
- Location: Uxbridge, Massachusetts
- Coordinates: 42°4′27″N 71°37′41″W
- Built: 1850
- Architectural style: Italianate
- MPS: Uxbridge MRA
- NRHP reference No.: 83004139
- Added to NRHP: October 7, 1983

The Moses Taft House is an historic house at 50 South Main Street in Uxbridge, Massachusetts. It is a two-story wood-frame structure, five bays wide, with a side gable roof, central chimney, clapboard siding, and granite foundation. Built c. 1850–55, it is a fine local example of Italianate architecture, with paneled pilasters at the corners, paired brackets under the eave, and molded caps above the windows. Additions extend the original house to the side and rear.

The house was built for Moses Taft, an early industrialist in the historic Blackstone Valley.

On October 7, 1983, the house was added to the National Register of Historic Places, where it is listed at 66 South Main Street.

== See also ==
- Taft family
- National Register of Historic Places listings in Uxbridge, Massachusetts
