= Moses Taft =

American politician

Moses Taft II (January 16, 1812 – April 2, 1893) was born at Uxbridge, Massachusetts. He was significant as an early American Industrialist and financier in the historic Blackstone Valley, and a member of the Taft family.

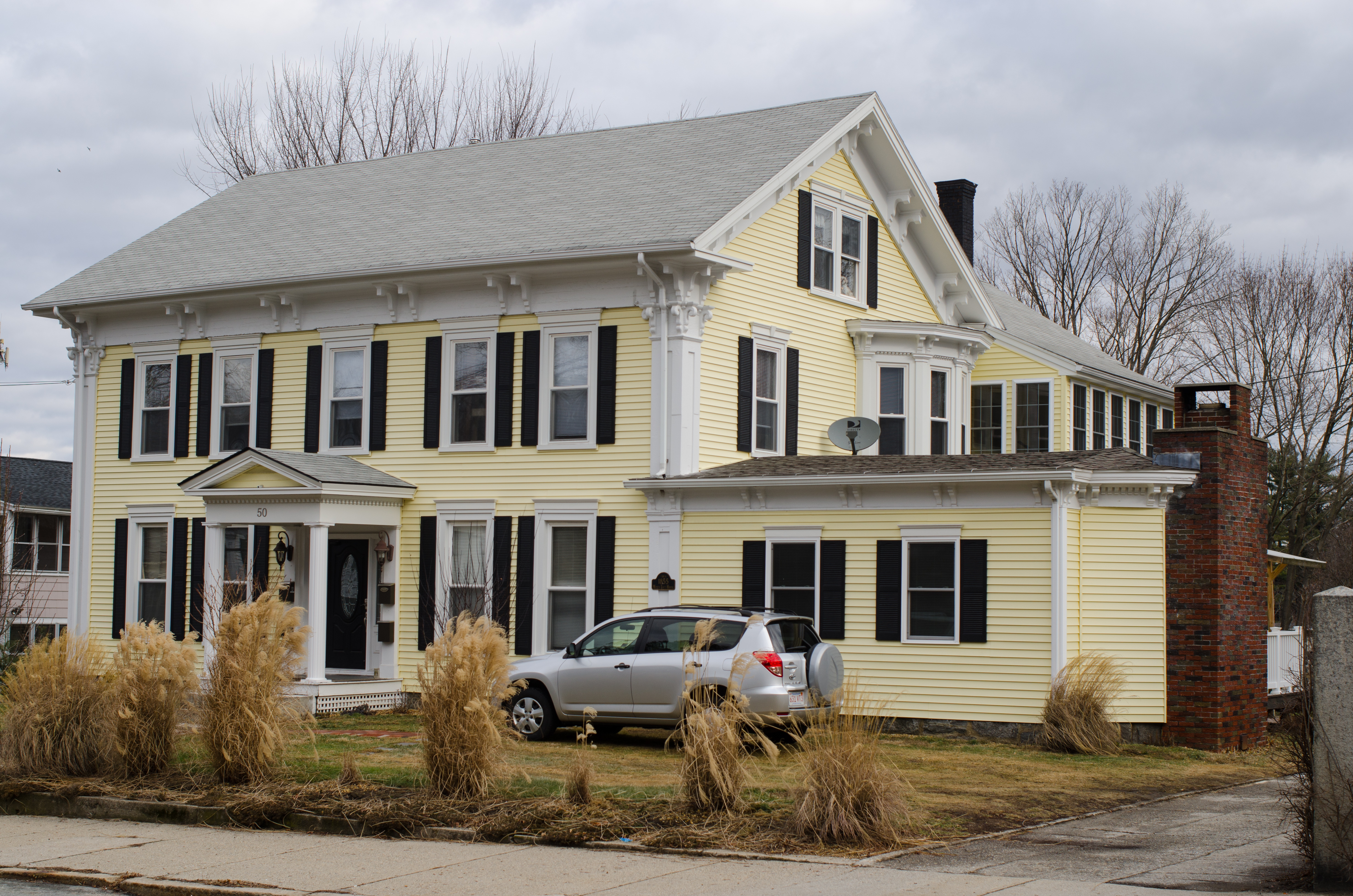
Moses Taft House, S. Main Street, Uxbridge

== Birth parents and family ==
Moses Taft was the second child to Luke Taft and Nancy Wood Taft. Moses married Sylvia Ann Wheelock daughter of Jerry Wheelock and Sukey Day, on 27 April 1834 at Uxbridge. He later married Emeline Newell Taft (Wing) who was the daughter of Timothy Taft and Polly Marsh, on 12 January 1858 at Uxbridge.

== Early life and career ==
Taft was born in Uxbridge, Massachusetts on January 16, 1812. His father Luke Taft was an early woolen mill pioneer.

Taft attended the Uxbridge Academy and the Friends school in Bolton, Massachusetts. His training prepared him for the manufacture of "satinets". He consistently pursued manufacturing, both independently and with Samuel W. Scott in Burrillville, Rhode Island. Next he worked with James W. Day as Taft, Day & Company, and later the firm became known as Taft & Capron. His other manufacturing interests were in Caryville, Northborough, and Southborough, Massachusetts, and at Proctor, Vermont.

Taft was president of the Blackstone bank and the Uxbridge Savings Bank. He represented Uxbridge in the Massachusetts State Legislature in 1847, and was frequently elected to the Board of Selectmen. He was a member and officer of the First Congregational Society of Uxbridge, and of the Uxbridge Lodge of International Order of Odd-fellows. He was widely known as a successful manufacturer and financier, and was closely allied to the prosperity of this town."

== Significance of his local industries ==
Taft was an important industrialist in the Blackstone Valley, America's first industrialized region. He built a woolen mill on the Blackstone River at Uxbridge around 1852. The mill ran around the clock during the American Civil War, making Union blue uniforms.

== Uxbridge Walking Tour ==
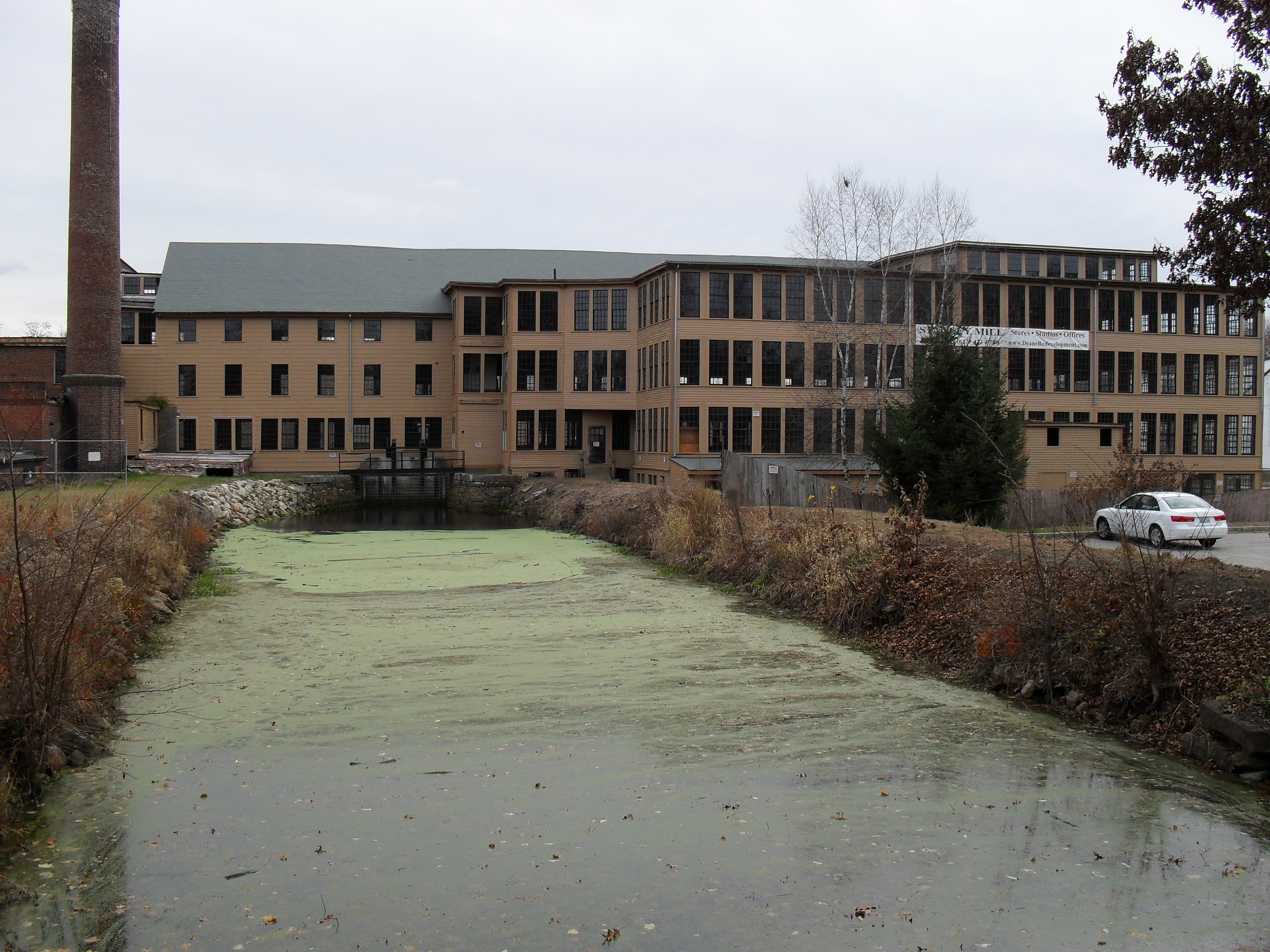
Stanely Woolen Mill, Nov. 11, 2009, Uxbridge, MA, with view of the Blackstone Canal

The Uxbridge Walking Tour at 146 Mendon is the site of the Stanley Woolen Mill, originally known as the Central Woolen Mill in Calumet Village. In 1852, Moses Taft built the mill and leased it to Israel Southwick and Richard Sayles. The mill produced the Union blue uniform cloth around the clock during the American Civil War until the mill was sold to Robert and Jacob Taft in 1865.

The younger Tafts built a dam at Rice City Pond which considerably increased the water power. In 1866, they installed an 80 horsepower (60 kW) steam engine, and production continued to rise dramatically. The mill started producing fancy cassimeres as the name changed to the Calumet Woolen Company.

Arthur and Stanley Wheelock bought the mill after 1905. They produced a half million yards of khaki for the US government during World War I, as well as cloth for the French and Italian governments. This was the longest running family-owned woolen mill in the US when it closed in 1988.

== Death and afterwards ==
Moses Taft 2nd died April 2, 1893, at Uxbridge, Worcester County, Massachusetts, at the age of 82. The Moses Taft Mill is now also known as the "Central Woolen Mills District" and is listed on the National Register of Historic Places.

== See also ==
- Moses Taft House (disambiguation)
- The Tafts of Mendon and Uxbridge
- Taft family

== Notes ==
- Crane, Ellery Bicknell (1907). 'Historic Homes and Genealogies of Worcester.
