= Justice Taft =

Justice Taft may refer to:

- William Howard Taft (1857–1930), president and later chief justice of the United States
- Kingsley A. Taft (1903–1970), chief justice of the Ohio Supreme Court
- Russell S. Taft (1835–1902), chief justice of the Vermont Supreme Court
