= Henry Waters Taft =

American lawyer

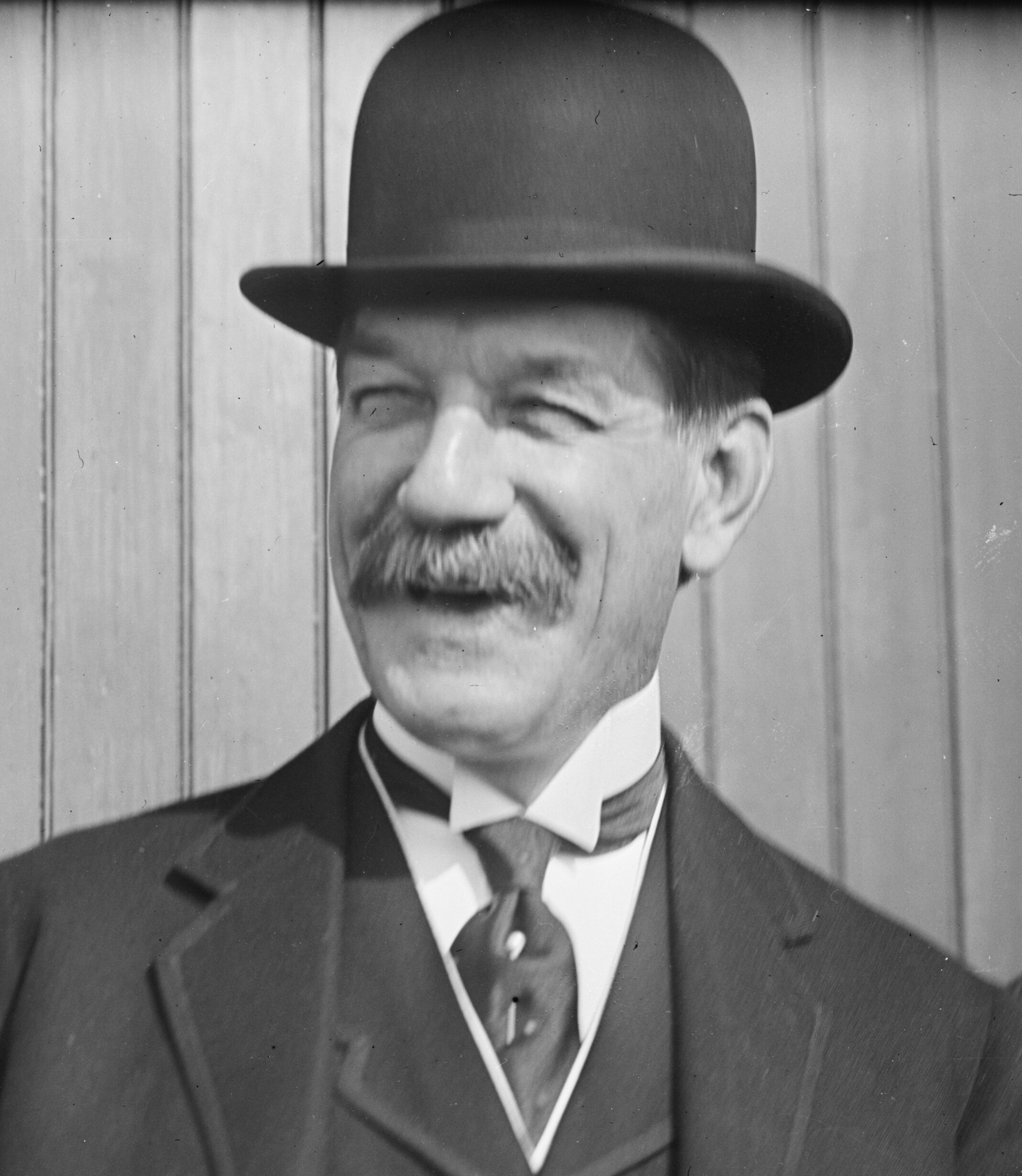
- Taft in 1900
- Born: May 27, 1859; Cincinnati, Ohio, U.S.
- Died: August 11, 1945 (aged 86); New York City, New York, U.S.
- Education: Yale University (1880)
- Occupation: Lawyer
- Employer: Cadwalader, Wickersham & Taft
- Known for: Antitrust law
- Political party: United States Republican Party
- Spouse: Julia Walbridge Smith
- Parent(s): Alphonso Taft; Louise Torrey
- Relatives: William Howard Taft (brother); Horace Dutton Taft (brother)

Henry Waters Taft (May 27, 1859 – August 11, 1945) was an American lawyer and writer. He was the son of Alphonso and brother of President William Howard Taft. A renowned antitrust lawyer, he was a name partner at Cadwalader, Wickersham & Taft.

== Biography ==
He graduated from Yale in 1880 with a BA, where he was a member of Skull and Bones and commencement orator of the class of 1880. Taft also studied at Cincinnati and Columbia Law Schools. He received an honorary MA from Yale in 1905.

In 1882, he was admitted to the bar, and began the practice of law in Ohio. Shortly afterward, he joined Strong & Cadwalader, in New York City, later Cadwalader, Wickersham & Taft. He also became counsel to the New York, New Haven & Hartford Railroad. After building up a reputation as a lawyer, Taft decided to run for Justice of the New York Supreme Court. He was defeated. Two years later, he was offered the position by Theodore Roosevelt, but he declined. The following year, he was appointed to the Charter Revision Commission to revise charter of Greater New York. From 1905 to January 1907, he was a special assistant to Attorneys General William H. Moody and Charles Joseph Bonaparte to investigate and prosecute the Tobacco Trust. During the trial, Taft pushed for the Tobacco Trust to release certain books, which they refused to submit as evidence. From 1917 to 1919, he was Chairman of the Permanent Legal Advisory Board for Greater New York. He also served on the Commission on Reorganisation of the New York State Government, from 1925 to 1926. In 1926, he was appointed to the Appellate Division of the Supreme Court. Taft became one of the most noted lawyers in New York.

During the annual convention of the American Bar Association, the delegates made a trip to Bohemian Grove. Taft who was among them said, 'There among the giant redwoods the spirit that is San Francisco was revealed to the visitors. The amalgamation of San Francisco Society through its love of beauty, through it cultural purpose has no duplicate in America and the Bohemian Club which unites the world of big business and the world of fine art, literature and cultural ideals could only exist in a community such as this.' Taft said his brother, William Howard Taft, was also very fond of the Bohemian Club.

He was a Trustee of the Mutual Life Insurance Company and the Central Savings Bank.

Taft was a member of the New York City Board of Education, from 1896 to 1900; Trustee of the College of the City of New York, from 1903 to 1905; Trustee of the New York Public Library, from 1908 to 1919; President of the Council of University Settlement House, from 1917 to 1919; member of the Advisory Committee to investigate public schools of New York City, in 1931; member of the Committee on Cost of Public Education, in 1933; and President of the League for Political Education, from 1919 to 1935.

He was affiliated with the Republican Party and was a delegate to the Republican National Convention, in 1920 and 1924. Taft was a supporter of the League of Nations, and wrote several articles on the organisation for the New York Times. He also wrote for other newspapers, including The Times.

Taft was Chairman of the Advisory Board of The Salvation Army for New York City from 1920 to 1940.

=== Marriage and Family ===
Taft married Julia Walbridge Smith (1858-1942) in Troy, New York on March 28, 1883. They had four children: Walbridge Smith Taft (1884-1951) who enlisted in the New York National Guard in 1910, and served during World War I, later becoming an attorney at his father’s law firm, Cadwalader, Wickersham & Taft; Marian Jennings Taft (1885-1888); William Howard Taft II (1887-1952), who served in the First World War with his brother, Walbridge, and is sometimes confused with his cousin, William Howard Taft III (the son of Robert A. Taft); and Louise Witherbee Taft (1891-1926).

=== Death ===
Taft died in New York City on August 11, 1945. He had been in the St. Luke's Hospital for fourteen weeks as the result of a hip injury received after a fall.

== Memberships ==
He was a member of the Association of the Bar of the City of New York (Vice President, 1911–1912); Chairman of the War Commission, 1917-1920 (President, 1923–1925); the New York County Lawyers' Association (Vice President, 1914–1918, 1923–1930; President, 1930–1932); the New York State Bar Association (President, 1919–1920); the American Bar Association (Chairman of the Committee on Jurisprudence and Law Reform); the New York Law Institute; the American Law Institute; the International Law Association; and the Maritime Law Association

He was a member of the Century Association, City Midday Club of New York, Down Town Association, New England Society, Ohio Society, Park Avenue Association, Pilgrims of the United States, Psi Upsilon, Skull and Bones and the Sons of the American Revolution.

Taft was President of the Japan Society of New York from 1923 to 1929 and from 1934 to 1941, resigning in December 1941 in the wake of the attack on Pearl Harbor. His law partner George W. Wickersham held the same position from 1931 to 1934.

== Honors ==
- Order of the Sacred Treasure (Japan), 1929
- Order of the Rising Sun, Gold and Silver Star (Japan), 1929
- Order of Distinguished Auxiliary Service, 24. February 1941

== Bibliography ==
- Occasional Papers and Addresses of an American Lawyer (1920)
- Japan and the Far East Conference (1921)
- Law Reform-Papers and Addresses by a Practicing Lawyer (1926)
- An Essay on Conversation (1927)
- Kindred Arts-Conversation and Public Speaking (1929)
- Japan and America-A Journey and a Political Survey (1932)
- Witnesses in Court (1934)
- Opinions-Literary and Otherwise (1934)
- A Century and a Half at the New York Bar (1938)
- Legal Miscellanies-Six Decades of Changes and Progress (1941)
