= Taft School =

School in Watertown, Connecticut, US

The Taft School

Location
- 110 Woodbury Road; Watertown, Connecticut 06795; United States; 41°36′16″N 73°7′27″W

Information
- Type: Private, day and boarding, college-prep
- Motto: Non ut sibi ministretur sed ut ministret (Not to be served but to serve)
- Established: 1890 (136 years ago)
- Founder: Horace Dutton Taft
- CEEB code: 070880
- Head of school: Peter Becker '95
- Faculty: 133
- Grades: 9–12, post-graduate
- Gender: Co-educational (since 1971)
- Enrollment: 592 (2026-27)
- Average class size: 11
- Student to teacher ratio: 4:1
- Campus size: 226 acres (0.91 km^{2})
- Colors: Yale blue and Harvard crimson
- Mascot: Rhino
- Nickname: Rhinos, Big Red
- Newspaper: The Papyrus
- Yearbook: The Annual
- Endowment: $439 million (2026)
- Annual tuition: $81,400 boarding; $60,050 day (2026–27)
- Revenue: $80.4 million (2024)
- Website: taftschool.org

The Taft School is a private coeducational school located in Watertown, Connecticut, United States. It enrolls about 600 students in grades 9–12.

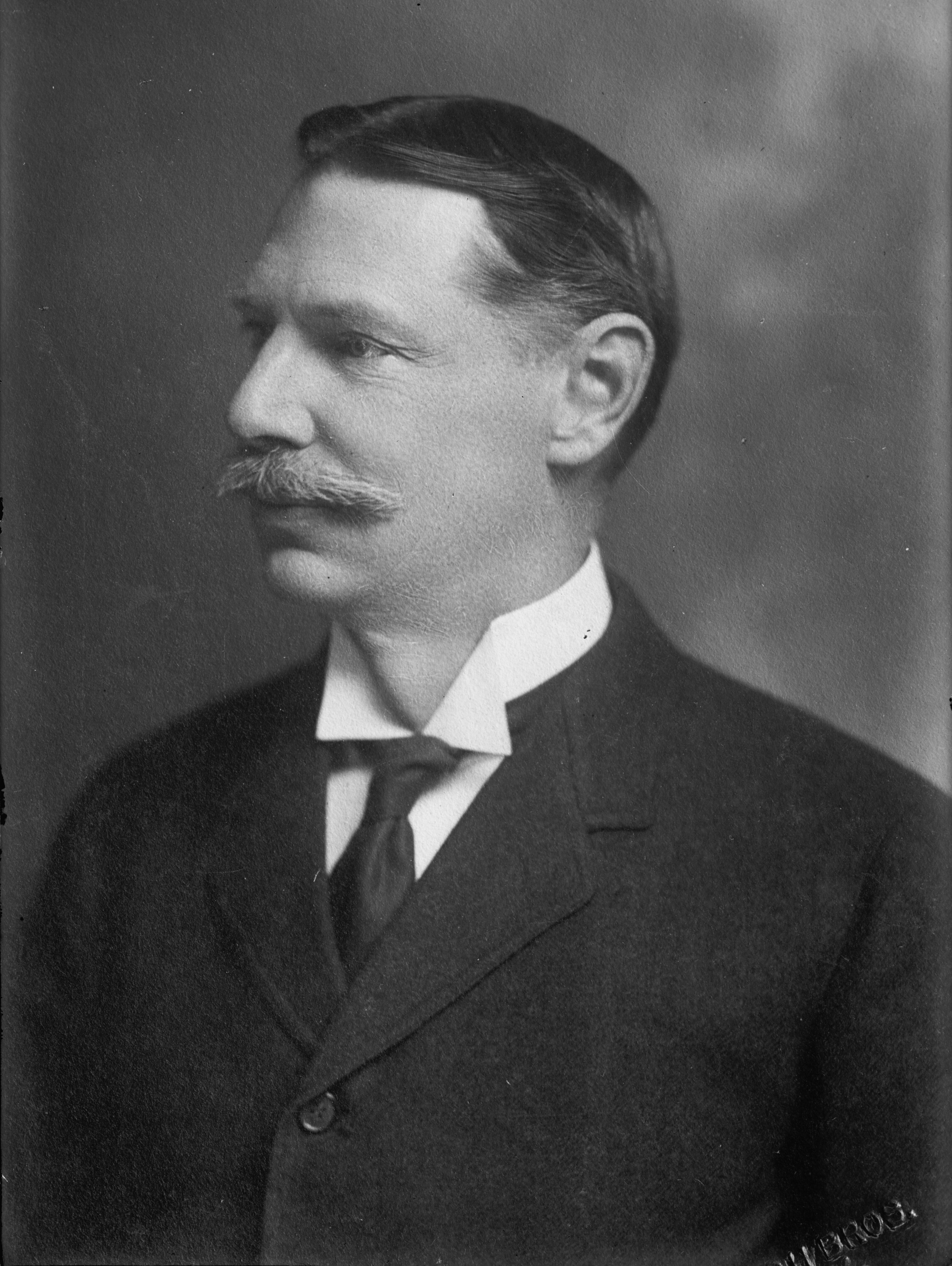
Horace Dutton Taft, founder of the school

== Overview ==
=== History ===
The school was founded in 1890 as Mr. Taft's School by Horace Dutton Taft, the brother of U.S. President William Howard Taft. Horace Taft's friend Sherman Day Thacher (the founder of California's Thacher School) inspired Taft to start his own boarding school. The school was initially headquartered in Pelham Manor, New York, but moved to Watertown, Connecticut in 1893. It was renamed The Taft School in 1898.

Along with Lawrenceville, Groton, Milton, and its athletic rival Hotchkiss, Taft was one of the first New England schools founded during the great boom in boarding schools at the turn of the twentieth century. In the school's first generation, around half of the student body came from Connecticut and New York. However, Horace Taft came from a famous Ohio political family, and the school developed a reputation for preparing children of the Midwestern gentry for Yale's entrance examinations. In 1928, around 50% of students came from the Mid-Atlantic, 32% from New England, and 11% from the Midwest. 77% percent of Taft graduates between the years of 1920 to 1924 attended Yale.

The school opened in Pelham Manor with ten boarding students, seven day students, and three teachers (including Horace Taft). The subsequent year, the number of boarding students increased to twenty while the day student population grew slightly and the school rented four buildings instead of two. By the end of the school's first year, Horace Taft realized that its current location and facilities were inadequate for the kind of school he envisioned. He leased a former hotel in Watertown called the Warren House and moved the school there in the summer of 1893. The Warren House was renovated to better fit an academic facility and was a part of the school until it was demolished in 1930.

In the late 1920s, Manhattan financier Edward Harkness donated $500,000 to launch a $2 million capital campaign for the school, enabling the construction of new campus buildings.

Horace Taft served as headmaster for 46 years. When he retired in 1936, Time described him as "the grandest" of prep school headmasters; he continued to teach civics at the school until his death in 1943. He was succeeded by Paul Cruikshank, who led the school for 27 years. In 1963, John Esty became headmaster and introduced the Independent Studies program the following year; he also oversaw the admission of the school's first female students in 1971. Lance Odden served as head of school from 1972 to 2001, followed by William MacMullen '78 from 2001 to 2023. The current head of school is Peter Becker '95.

=== Student body ===
In the 2026-27 school year, Taft enrolls 592 students in grades 9–12, including 115 freshmen (in academy jargon, "lower mids"), 140 sophomores ("mids"), 170 juniors ("upper mids"), and 167 seniors ("seniors").

This year, 84% of the student body lives on campus. 45% of students identify as people of color and 25% come from abroad. 35% of students are on financial aid; and 34% previously attended public schools.

The school's admission rate was 16% in 2023. In 2026, Niche ranked Taft #11 in national boarding schools.

=== Campus ===
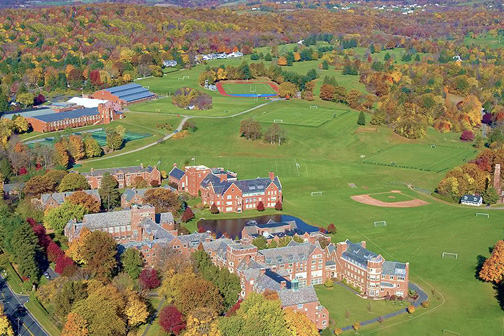
Aerial view of Taft School main campus

Taft is located on the grounds of a former hotel in Watertown, Connecticut; the school demolished the original hotel building in 1930. The Watertown campus began with six acres and has since grown to 226 acres. In 2018, Architectural Digest named Taft the most beautiful private high school campus in Connecticut.

The school owns several homes within the Watertown Center Historic District, which is listed on the National Register of Historic Places. However, Taft's core campus is not part of the historic district.

The school's early campus buildings were designed in the Collegiate Gothic style by architect Bertram Goodhue of the firm Cram, Goodhue and Ferguson, with landscape planning by Frederick Law Olmsted Jr. In 1929–1930, architect James Gamble Rogers designed Charles Phelps Taft Hall, a dormitory whose Gothic detailing closely matched Goodhue's earlier work on the campus.

In 2002, Robert A. M. Stern designed a new dormitory that continued the campus's Collegiate Gothic vocabulary; the Yale Daily News noted that Taft chose Stern in part because they wanted to extend the red-brick Gothic style established by Goodhue and Rogers. In 2010, the Gund Partnership completed a $20 million renovation and expansion of the Horace Dutton Taft dining hall, adding 25,000 square feet (2,300 m^{2}) of new construction to the original 12,000 square feet (1,100 m^{2}) space; the project received LEED Gold certification.

In November 2025, the school announced a $66 million plan to construct two new all-freshman dorms, each housing 68 students and 5 faculty, which will allow the school to continue to "meet demand" from boarding applicants. As of the 2026, these dorms are expected to be completed and open for the 2028-29 fall semester.

=== Academics ===
In 1964, headmaster John Esty established the Independent Studies Program, which The Boston Globe described as "the first of its kind in the nation"; the program allows seniors to pursue a self-directed research project in any field while being excused from some regular coursework.

== Finances ==
=== Endowment and expenses ===
Taft's financial endowment stood at $439 million as of June 30, 2026. In its Internal Revenue Service filings for the 2021–22 school year, Taft reported total assets of $447.9 million, net assets of $382.3 million, investment holdings of $283.8 million, and cash holdings of $24.1 million. Taft also reported $49.2 million in program service expenses and $10.4 million in grants (primarily student financial aid).

== Academics ==
=== Curriculum ===
Taft follows a standard semester system—splitting the year into fall and spring periods. Similar to other college preparatory boarding schools, Taft offers an extensive curriculum, consisting of English, mathematics, science, history, philosophy, various arts, and foreign language. These courses are taught by the school’s 133-member faculty at a teacher-to-student ratio of 4:1 and an average class size of 11.

In keeping with the school’s Portrait of a Leaner, students at Taft are required to complete a wide array of courses, including eight semesters of English, four semesters of history (including two of US history), four units of laboratory science, one foreign language through level three, math through algebra two, and four semesters of a visual or performing art. Lower-school students in 9th and 10th grade must take five classes per semester, while older students may take four. Beyond these requirements, students are allowed near free range to select courses from Taft’s catalog of over 200 courses.

Taft does not rank students. Assessments at Taft are graded on a 40-100 scale, whereby 60 is the minimum passing grade. A grade of 90-92 receives the distinction of Honors, whilst a grade of 93 or higher receives a High Honors distinction. In addition, students also receive Academic Habit Grades, which are assigned by course teachers on a scale from E (Exceeds Expectations) to U (Unacceptable). These grades are reported to students and parents but are not made available on transcripts or to colleges.

== Athletics ==
Taft offers seventeen varsity sports and an intramural equestrian program. The school's athletic facilities include an 18-hole golf course, 16 tennis courts (four indoor), eight squash courts, two field houses, two tracks (one indoor, one outdoor), two ice hockey rinks (one Olympic-sized and one NHL-sized), and more than 10 playing fields.

Taft and its athletic rival Hotchkiss compete in the Founders League, a group of prep schools mostly located in Connecticut. Taft's athletic teams are known as the Rhinos (or the "Big Red Rhinos"), and its school colors are Yale blue and Harvard crimson.

== Controversies ==
=== Sexual misconduct ===
In December 2012, the FBI arrested Richard Doyle, a theater and film teacher, on charges of receipt, distribution, and possession of child pornography. Investigators found over 4,000 images and six videos on his computer and storage devices; Doyle admitted to trading child pornography for at least two years. He pleaded guilty in December 2013 and was sentenced in August 2017 to five years in federal prison.

In 2016, a Boston Globe Spotlight investigation revealed that Charles Thompson, whom the school had hired as director of information technology in 2011, had been the subject of sexual misconduct complaints involving students at his previous employer, St. George's School, which had not disclosed the allegations. Taft placed Thompson on administrative leave and retained an independent investigator.

=== Racial incidents ===
On Martin Luther King Jr. Day in January 2018, a Black student found racial slurs written on a bulletin board on his dormitory door; other students reported homophobic notes and the vandalism of a painting. The school canceled classes and opened an investigation.

In June 2020, two recent alumni created the Black@Taft Instagram account, which collected accounts of racism and microaggressions at the school dating back to the 1990s. The account gained more than 2,300 followers, and over 900 alumni signed a letter calling on the school to take action. Taft responded by establishing an anti-bias, anti-racism caucus and creating an incident reporting system.

== In literature ==
Kendra James's memoir Admissions: A Memoir of Surviving Boarding School (2022) recounts her experience as the school's first Black legacy student in the early 2000s. Esquire named it one of the best nonfiction books of 2022.
