= William Howard Taft University =

U.S. for-profit online university

- Type: Private for-profit online university
- Established: 1976; 50 years ago
- President: Amy Kahn
- Administrative staff: 33 (2022)
- Students: 614 (2022)
- Location: Denver, Colorado, United States
- Website: www.taft.edu/

William Howard Taft University is a private for-profit online university headquartered in Denver, Colorado. Founded in 1976 as a graduate school providing continuing education for certified public accountants, the university provides distance education and offers academic programs up to the doctoral level. William Howard Taft University and Taft Law School together form the Taft University System.

== History ==
The university was founded in 1976 and received full accreditation in 2003 from the Distance Education and Training Council. William Howard Taft University's Doctor of Education program was suspended in 2003, so that the university might be accredited by the Distance Education and Training Council, which did not accredit doctoral programs at the time. In 2009, the DETC's scope of authority was expanded to include professional doctorates and the program was resumed.

Since 2006, the university has offered the degree of Master of Education. In 2010, it began offering the Doctor of Business Administration and B.S. in Business Administration.

== Academics ==
William Howard Taft University offers an online Bachelor's degree completion program in business administration, Master of Business Administration (MBA) degree programs, and master's degree programs in taxation (MST) and education (M.Ed.). Doctoral degree programs are offered in business (DBA) and education (EdD).

The university is accredited by the Accrediting Commission of the Distance Education Accrediting Commission.
