= The Shipbuilder and his Wife =

1633 painting by Rembrandt van Rijn

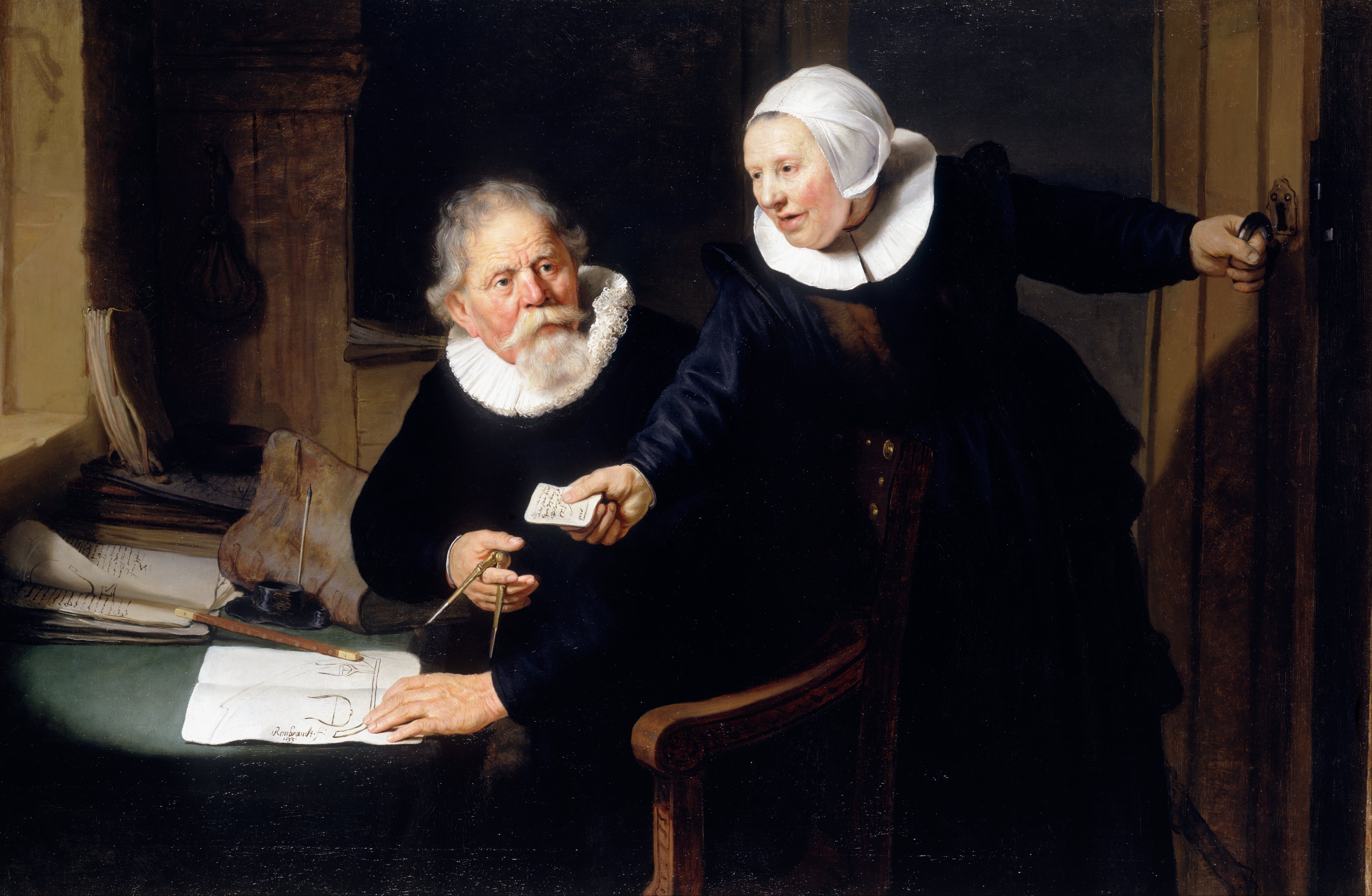
The Shipbuilder and his Wife, 1633. Royal Collection

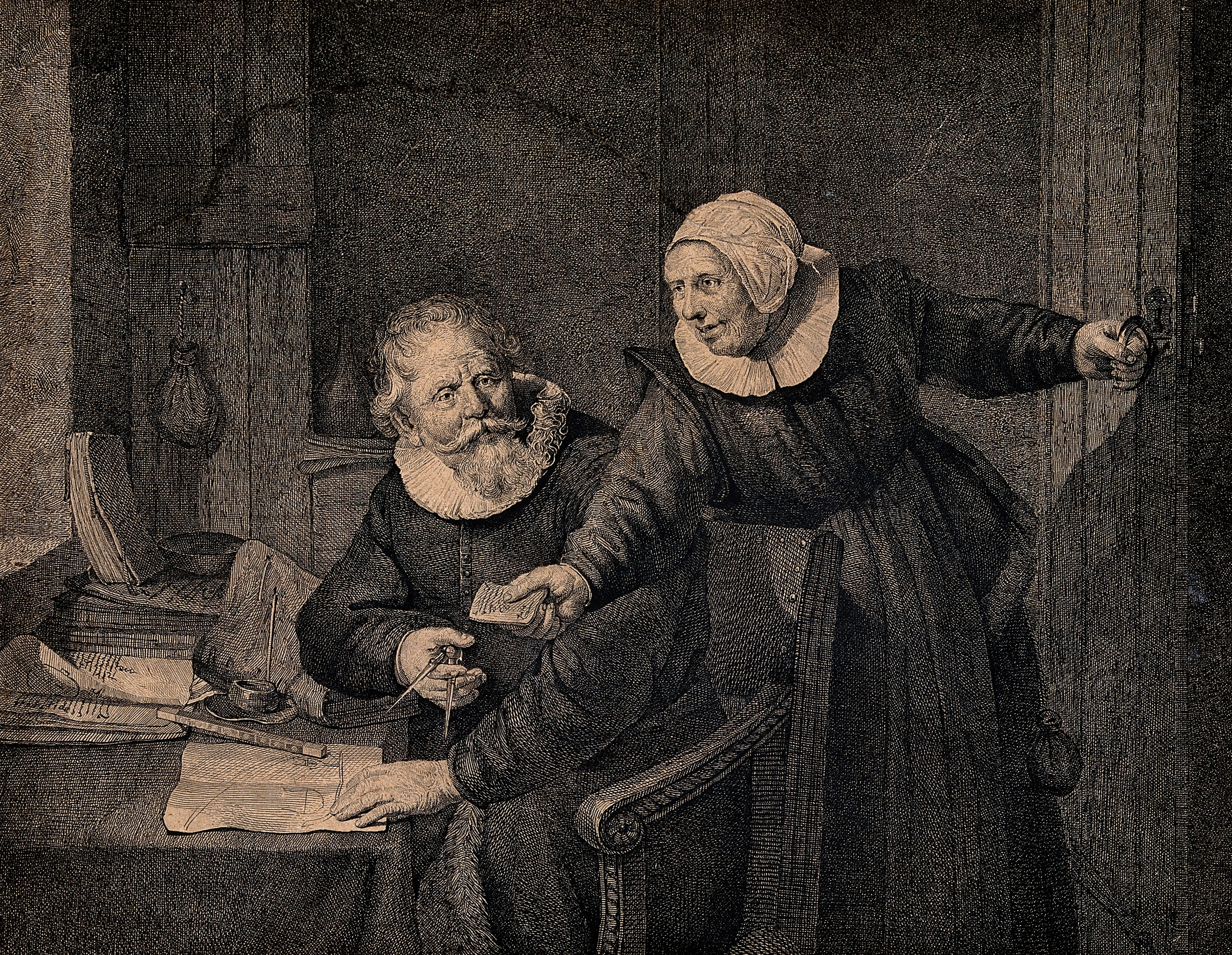
Etching by Johannes Pieter de Frey, dated 1800

The Shipbuilder and his Wife is a 1633 painting by Rembrandt. The sitters were identified in 1970 as Jan Rijcksen (1560/1562–1637) and his wife Griet Jans Rijcksen. Rijcksen was a shareholder in the Dutch East India Company, and became its master shipbuilder in 1620. The painting has been in the Royal Collection since 1811.

At this relatively early date, Rembrandt was accomplished at depicting the natural surfaces of wood, leather, skin, and hair, and he had become a fashionable portrait painter. Rather than making the usual pair of separate husband-and-wife paintings, like his more typical Portrait of a Man Rising from His Chair and Portrait of a Young Woman with a Fan, Rembrandt combined them into a double portrait, with the two sitters interacting. Rijcksen is shown seated at a desk, where he has been making drawings of ship designs, holding a pair of compasses; his wife has just entered the room to hand her husband a written note. The letter shown in the painting is addressed to "Jan ryensz" [sic]. The drawing of a ship shown in the painting bears the signature and date: "Rembrandt. f: / 1633".

This portrait is among the best documented of Rembrandt's works. It was recorded in the estate of the sitters' son Cornelis Jansz. Reijckx at his death in November 1659, and at two sales in Amsterdam: the sale of the collection of Jan Gildemeester in June 1800 to Pieter de Smeth, and when it was sold again in August 1810. It was imported to England and sold at Christie's in London in 1811 to the Prince Regent (later King George IV) and remains in the Royal Collection.

The oil on canvas painting measures 113.8 by 169.8 centimetres (44.8 in × 66.9 in) but it may have been cut down from a larger work: an early etching dated 1800 shows more space above the sitters' heads.

The painting was restored by Karen Ashworth, working for the Royal Collection.

Its intense effect is noted in Zadie Smith's novel 'On Beauty' (2005)

== See also ==
- List of paintings by Rembrandt
