= Charles Phelps Taft =

American politician

Charles P. Taft
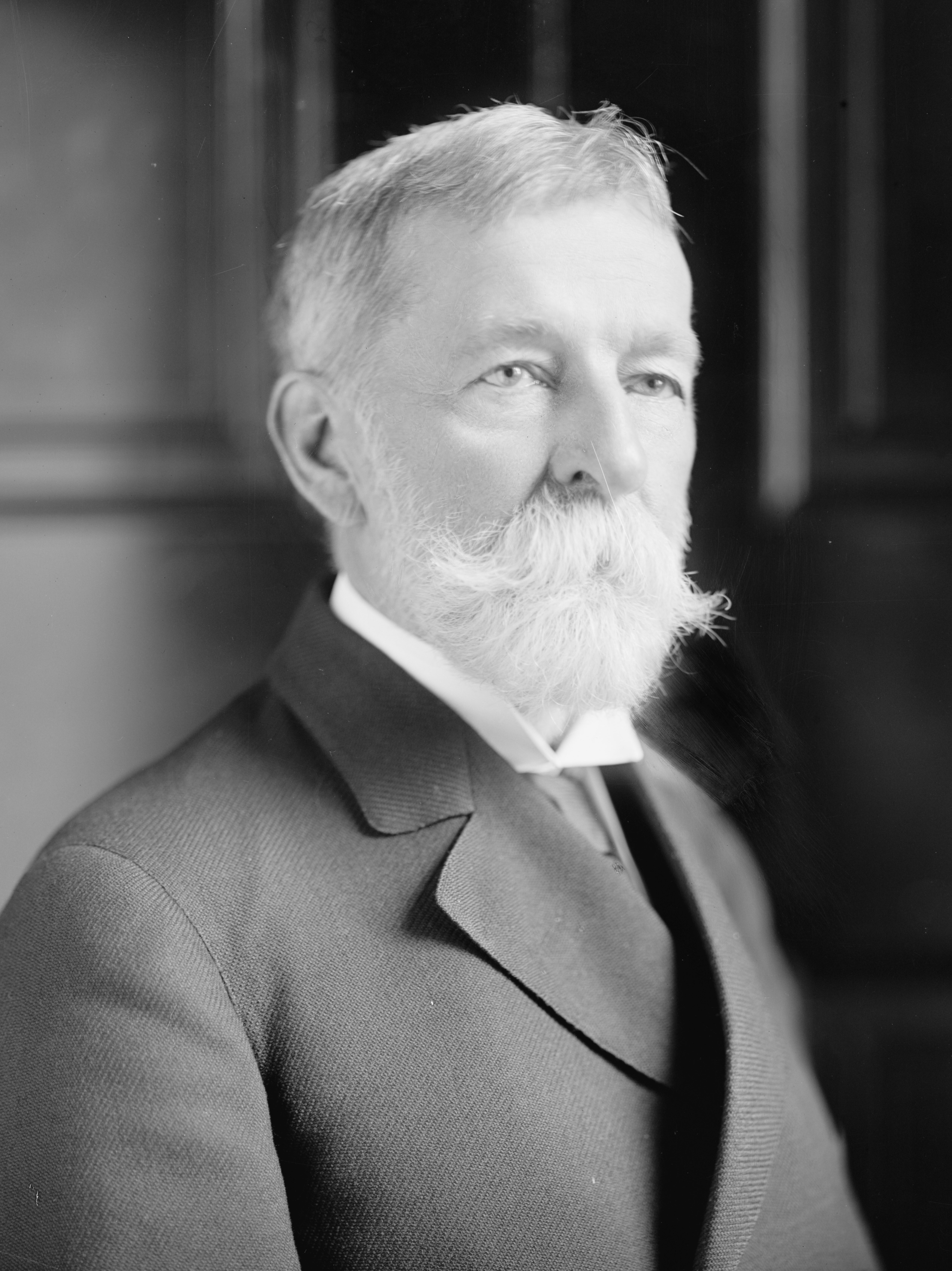

Member of the U.S. House of Representatives from Ohio's 1st district
- In office March 4, 1895 – March 3, 1897
- Preceded by: Bellamy Storer
- Succeeded by: William B. Shattuc

Personal details
- Born: Charles Phelps Taft; December 21, 1843 Cincinnati, Ohio, U.S.
- Died: December 31, 1929 (aged 86) Cincinnati, Ohio, U.S.
- Resting place: Spring Grove Cemetery
- Party: Republican
- Spouse: Anna Sinton (m. 1873)
- Relations: Taft family
- Parent(s): Alphonso Taft; Fanny Phelps
- Education: Phillips Academy
- Alma mater: Yale University; Columbia Law School; University of Heidelberg

Charles Phelps Taft (December 21, 1843 – December 31, 1929) was an American lawyer and politician who served as editor of the Cincinnati Times-Star, and owned both the Philadelphia Phillies and Chicago Cubs baseball teams. From 1895 to 1897, he served one term in the U.S. House of Representatives.

== Early life ==
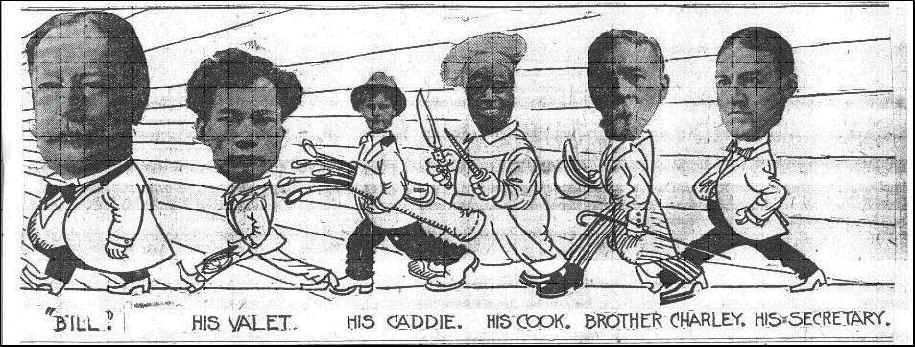
"Brother Charley" shown as part of president Taft's entourage.

Taft was born on December 21, 1843, in Cincinnati, Ohio. He was the eldest child born to Fanny Phelps and Alphonso Taft. His father served as the 34th United States Attorney General and 31st United States Secretary of War, both under President Ulysses S. Grant. Among his younger half-brothers was William Howard Taft, the 27th President of the United States and 10th Chief Justice of the United States, and Horace Dutton Taft, the founder of The Taft School in Watertown, Connecticut, to which he donated $150,000 in 1929.

His maternal grandfather was Judge Charles Phelps, of Townshend, Vermont, and his paternal grandparents were Peter Rawson Taft (1785–1867) of the Taft family and Sylvia (née Howard) Taft. He was the uncle of Robert Alphonso Taft and Charles Phelps Taft II, and the granduncle of Robert Taft Jr.

He was educated at the Phillips Academy in Andover, Massachusetts, graduated from Yale University in 1864, and from Columbia University's law department in 1866. In 1867, he received another degree from the University of Heidelberg.

== Career ==
Following his graduation from Columbia Law School, he was admitted to the bar, and became a partner in the law firm of Sage, Haacke & Taft. He remained with the firm until he left to study abroad in Germany and France.

After returning from Germany, he resumed the practice of law in 1869 with General Edward F. Noyes, who later served as U.S. Minister to France and the 30th Governor of Ohio, at which point Taft was elected to the Ohio State Legislature. Ten years later in 1879, he became editor of the Cincinnati Times-Star, which would later be bought by the Cincinnati Post. This began the Taft media empire, which was his main claim to fame.

=== United States Congress ===
In 1895, he went to Congress as a Republican succeeding Bellamy Storer, but served only two years from March 4, 1895, until March 3, 1897. He was not a candidate for renomination in 1896 to the Fifty-fifth Congress, and his seat was taken by William B. Shattuc. After retiring from Congress, he returned to the newspaper business.

Taft was a presidential elector in the 1904 presidential election.

=== Baseball team ownership ===
In 1905, Taft became a minority owner of the Chicago Cubs when Charles Murphy purchased the club. In 1909, Taft and Murphy funded Horace Fogel's purchase of the Philadelphia Phillies. The pair publicly denied that they had purchased a second club, but did acknowledge that Taft was the owner of Philadelphia's National League Park. After Fogel received a lifetime ban from baseball in 1912, Taft sold the Phillies to William H. Locke. In 1914, Murphy sold his stock in the Cubs to Taft, who named Charles H. Thomas, the secretary under Murphy, as the new club president. Taft sold the Cubs to Charles Weeghman, with some financial backing from William Wrigley Jr., after the 1915 season. In 1916, Taft sold his interest in West Side Park and National League Park to Murphy.

== Personal life ==
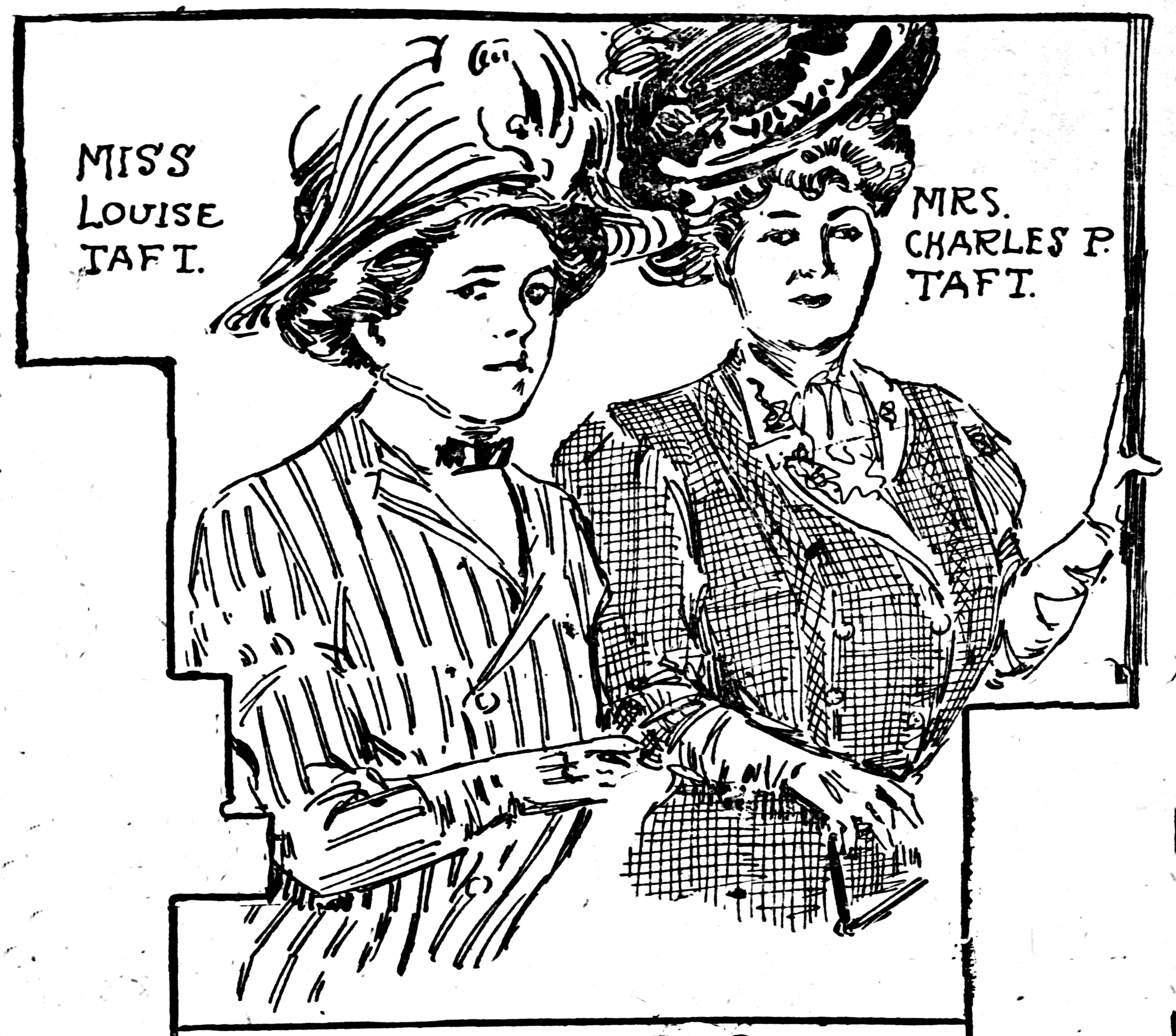
1908 drawing by Marguerite Martyn of Louise Taft (left) and Anna Sinton Taft (right).

On December 4, 1873, Taft was married to Anna Sinton (1850–1931), who was an heiress to a pig iron fortune, left by her father, David Sinton. Together with her husband, she began an art collection, which she opened to the public from their home. Today, their former home is the Taft Museum of Art. Anna and Taft had four children, who were:

- Jane Ellison Taft (1874–1962)
- David Sinton Taft (1876–1891)
- Anna Louise Taft Semple (1879–1961)
- Charles Howard Taft (1885–1931).

Taft died on December 31, 1929, in Cincinnati, Ohio, where he was buried at Spring Grove Cemetery. He left an estate valued at $6,367,374.

=== Descendants ===
Through his daughter Jane, he was the grandfather of First World War flying ace David Sinton Ingalls (1899–1985), who married Louise Hale Harkness, daughter of William L. Harkness and granddaughter of Daniel M. Harkness, who was instrumental in the formation of Standard Oil. He was also the grandfather of Anne Taft Ingalls, who married Rupert E. L. Warburton, "a scion of one of England's oldest families," in 1929. His nephew, Charles Phelps Taft II who served as Mayor of Cincinnati, Ohio from 1955 to 1957 was named after him.

== Legacy ==
Following his death, Annie (Anna) Sinton Taft donated $5 million to the University of Cincinnati in 1930 and established a memorial fund after his name. This fund was transformed in 2005 into the Charles Phelps Taft Research Center at the University of Cincinnati. The city of Taft, Texas was named after him in 1904.

His art collection was said to be the most valuable in the West in 1908. He owned at least two works each of Jean-Baptiste-Camille Corot, Jean-François Millet and Ernest Meissonier, many pieces of fine Chinese porcelain, Portrait of a Man Rising from His Chair by Rembrandt, The Tompkinson Boys by Thomas Gainsborough, and The Cobbler's Apprentice by Frank Duveneck, as well as paintings by Anthony van Dyck, Frans Hals, Jan Steen, Meindert Hobbema, Francisco Goya, Joshua Reynolds and Rousseau.

== Sources ==
U.S. House of Representatives
Preceded by Bellamy Storer	Member of the U.S. House of Representatives from Ohio's 1st congressional district March 4, 1895–March 4, 1897	Succeeded by William B. Shattuc
Business positions
Preceded by James Potter	Owner of the Philadelphia Phillies; 1905–1913	Succeeded by William F. Baker
Preceded by Charles Murphy	Owner of the Chicago Cubs; 1914–1916	Succeeded by Charles Weeghman
