= Annie Sinton-Taft =

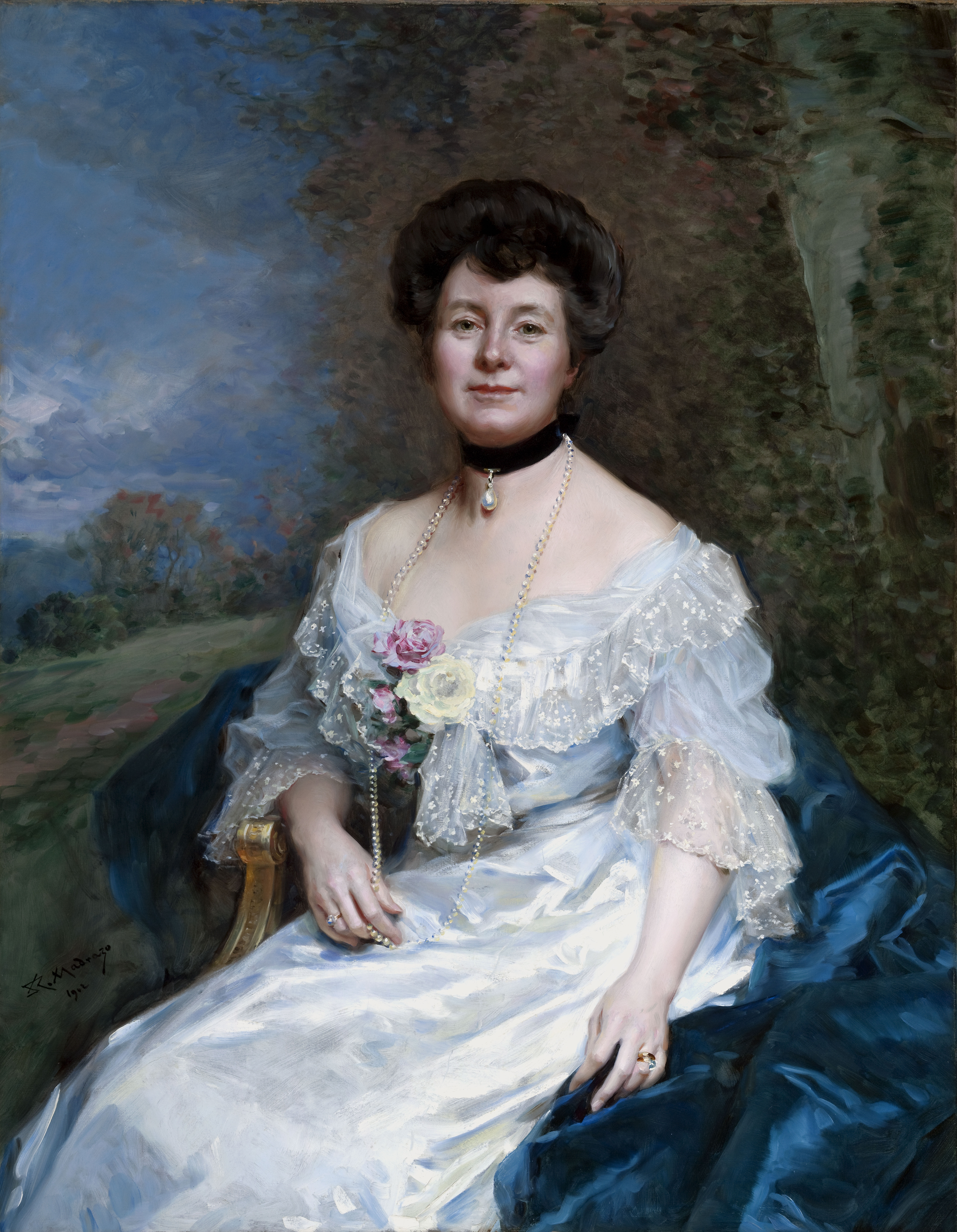
- Anna Sinton Taft
- Born: Anna; March 12, 1852; Cincinnati, Ohio
- Died: January 31, 1931 (aged 78)
- Resting place: Spring Grove Cemetery
- Spouse: Charles Phelps Taft (married 1873)
- Children: Elisa Taft; Anna Louise Taft; Jane Taft; David Sinton Taft; Howard Taft
- Parents: David Sinton; Jane Ellison

Annie Sinton Taft was a prominent socialite, heiress and philanthropist in 20th-century Cincinnati. Her art collection and house make up the modern Taft Museum of Art, and her inheritance made her the richest woman in Ohio.

== Early life ==
Annie Taft was born Anna Sinton on March 12, 1852 in Cincinnati, Ohio. She was born to industrialist and pig iron stockpiler David Sinton.

She had one brother, Edward M. Sinton.

== Marriage and inheritance ==
Anna married Charles Phelps Taft in 1873, taking his surname. They were married in her father's home. Charles was part of the Taft family, and had recently graduated from Yale and Columbia, boosting her social status.

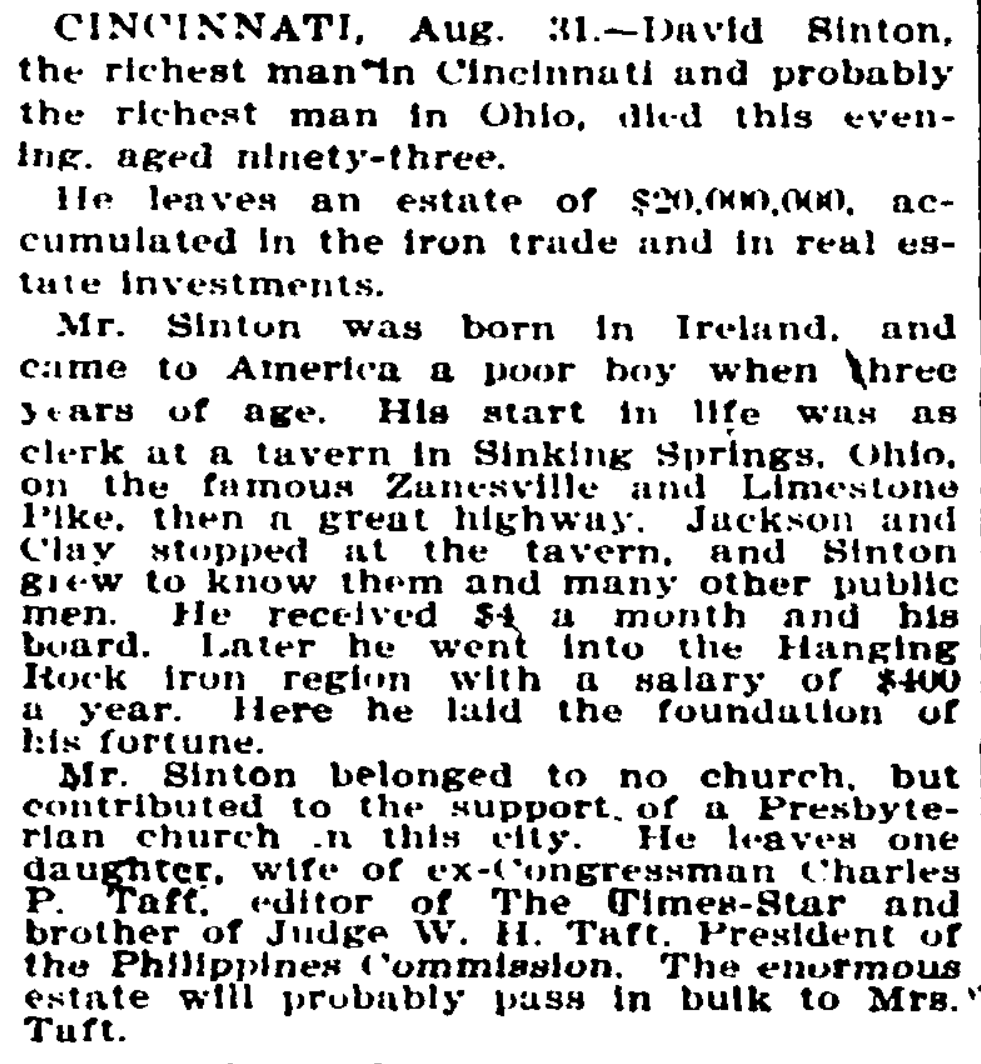
Article in the The New York Times detailing Sinton's inheritance

Annie's brother Edward had died in 1869, making her the sole heir to her father's fortune. When her father died in 1900, he left her $20 million dollars (the equivalent of $786,221,428.57 in 2026), and his house. This inheritance made her the wealthiest woman in Ohio.

The money later went towards funding the couple's art collections, expansions to their home, and financing William Howard Taft's presidential campaign.

== Art collection ==
Charles and Annie first began collecting art in 1902 during a trip to New York.

Over the course of 30 years, the Tafts' collection grew to a size that came to rival other private collections in America. Their collection of paintings mainly focused on old master landscapes and portraiture by Dutch, French, and English artists (such as Rembrandt, Joshua Reynolds, Thomas Gainsborough, Frans Hals, J. M. W. Turner, Willem Maris, John Singer Sargent, and Charles-François Daubigny), but also included works from local Cincinnati artists, such as Frank Duveneck and Henry Farny.

Other pieces in their collection included Chinese porcelains and snuff-boxes attributed to the House of Fabergé.

Ultimately, the Taft family wanted their collection to be publicly accessible. They pledged their residence and art collection to public museum upon their deaths, and included funds towards its establishment and care in their will. This resulted in the creation in the Taft Museum of Art, upon Annie's death in 1931.

=== Notable pieces ===
Their collection was home to numerous notable pieces, so this is not an exhaustive list.

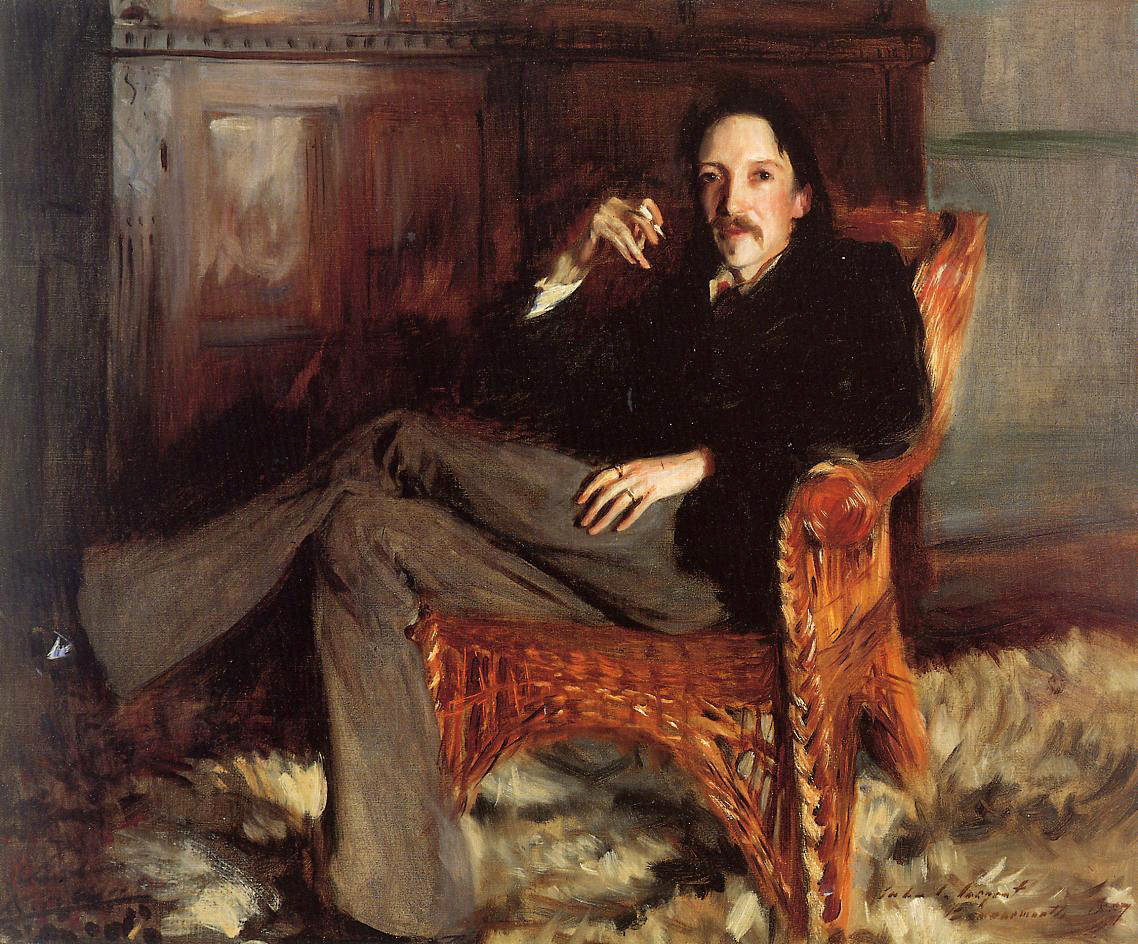
Robert Louis Stevenson, John Singer Sargent

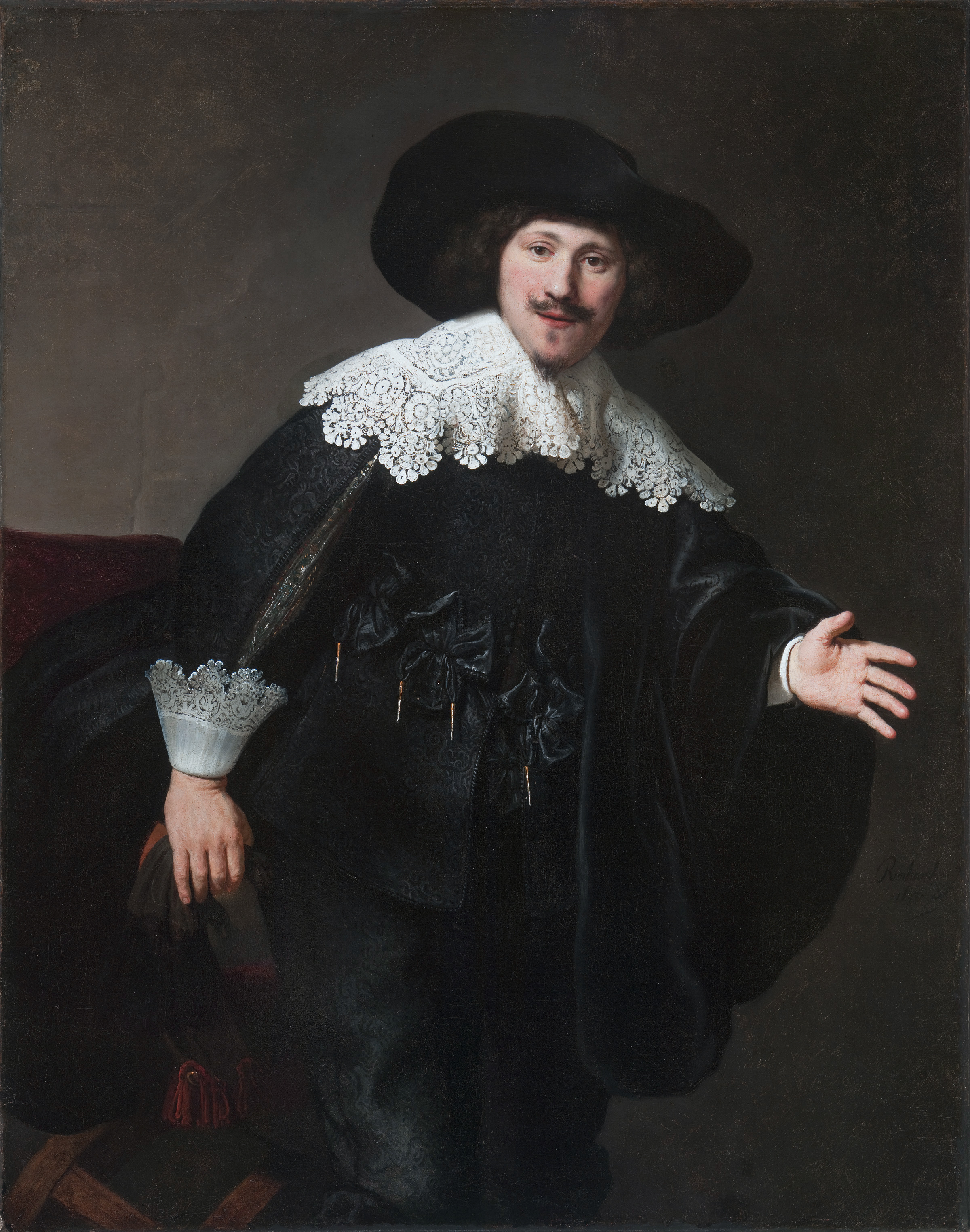
A Man Rising From His Chair, Rembrandt

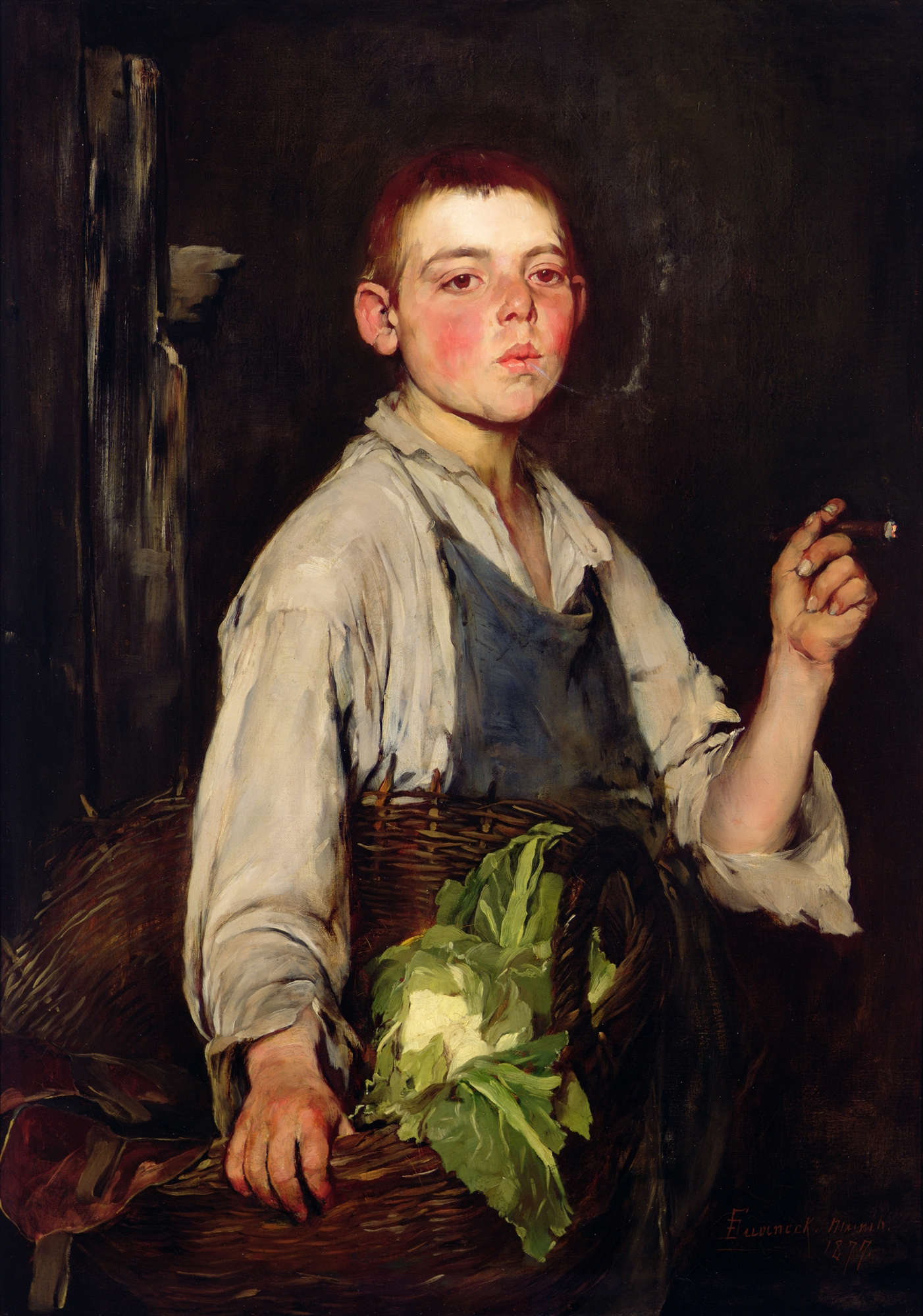
The Cobbler's Apprentice, Frank Duveneck

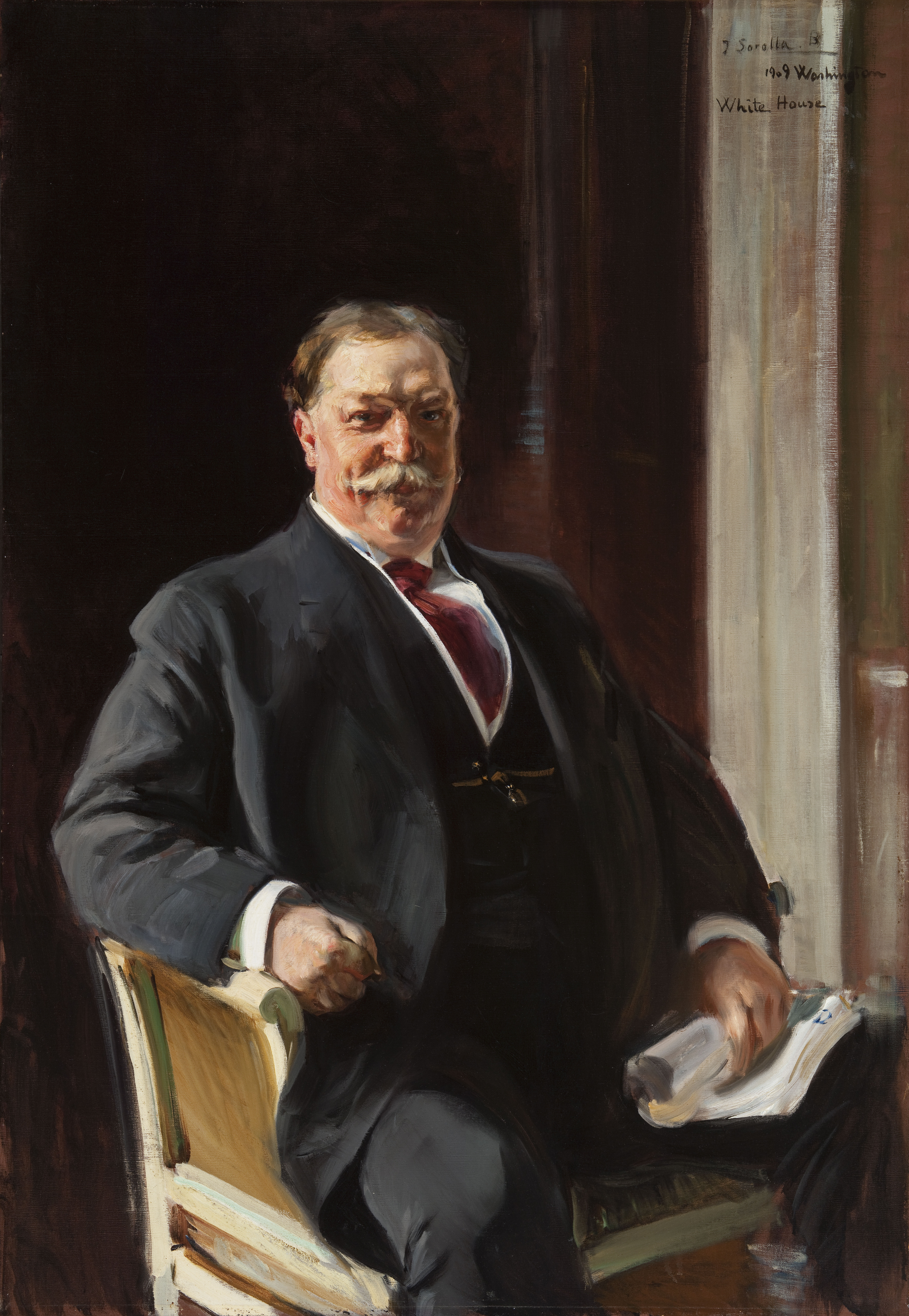
William Howard Taft, Joaquín Sorolla y Bastida

== Later Life ==
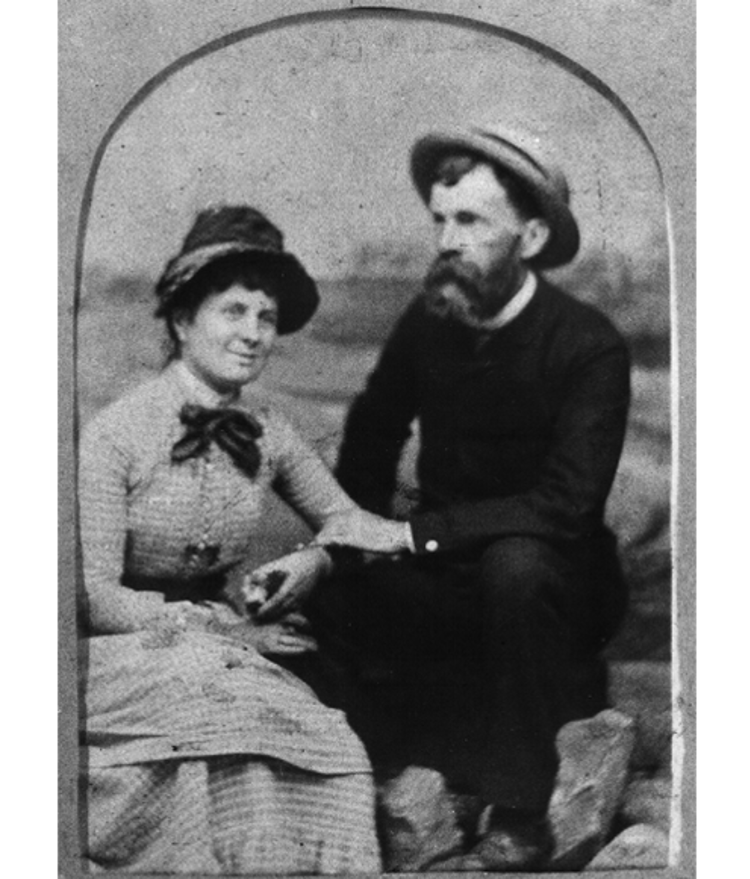
Charles and Anna Taft photographed together sometime around 1880

Annie Taft's later life was marked with the construction of the Cincinnati Times-Star Building, increased philanthropy, and the death of her husband in 1929.

=== Death ===
Annie died on March 12, 1931, in her family's home.

She is buried at Spring Grove Cemetery.

== Personal life ==
=== Philanthrophy ===
Throughout her life, Annie engaged in numerous philanthropic efforts. Many of them were focused on promoting or saving the arts in Cincinnati. These included:

- donating $75,000 to construct a home for the University of Cincinnati College of Law
- giving UC $2,000,000 to endow the Charles Phelps Taft Memorial Fund, which supports studies in humanities, languages, economics and mathematics
- helped in the founding of the Cincinnati Symphony Orchestra, and helped establish the Cincinnati Opera
- buying the Cincinnati Zoo and Botanical Garden for $250,000, saving it from financial demise
- Advocating for a public art museum through the Women’s Art Museum Association
- helped in the founding of the Cincinnati MacDowell Society

=== Descendents ===
Through her daughter Jane, she was the grandmother of First World War flying ace David Sinton Ingalls (1899–1985), who married Louise Hale Harkness, daughter of William L. Harkness and granddaughter of Daniel M. Harkness, who was instrumental in the formation of Standard Oil. She was also the grandmother of Anne Taft Ingalls, who married Rupert E. L. Warburton, "a scion of one of England's oldest families," in 1929.
