= Martin Baum =

American politician

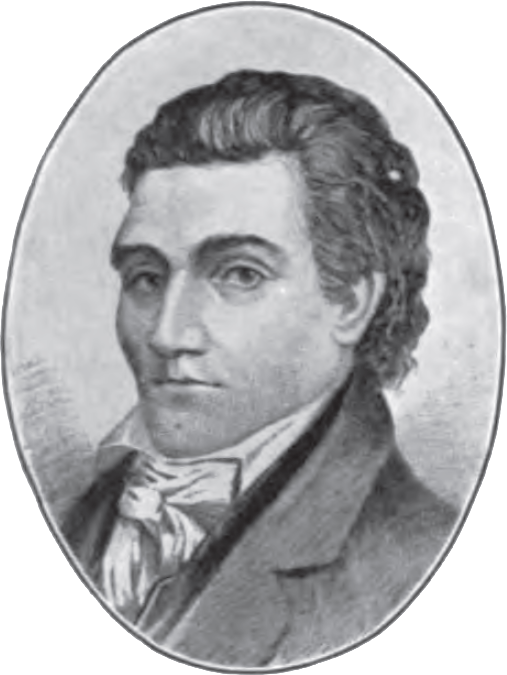
- Born: June 15, 1765; Hagerstown, Maryland, U.S.
- Died: December 14, 1831 (aged 66); Cincinnati, Ohio, U.S.
- Resting place: Spring Grove Cemetery

Martin Baum (15 June 1765 – 14 December 1831) was an American businessman and politician.

The son of German immigrants Jacob Baum and Magdalena Elizabeth Kershner, Baum fought with General Anthony Wayne at the Battle of Fallen Timbers.

After settling in Cincinnati, Baum became active in civic affairs, and was elected mayor in 1807 and 1812. Through his agents in Baltimore, New Orleans and Philadelphia, Baum attracted a great number of German immigrants to work in his various enterprises — steamboats, a sugar refinery, a foundry, and real estate. Baum founded the Western Museum, was active in the first public library in 1802, and was one of the main pillars of the First Presbyterian Church. He married Anna Somerville Wallace in 1804.

He bought the 9-acre (36,000 m^{2}) property on Pike Street in 1812, to build his home. Benjamin Henry Latrobe, architect of the United States Capitol designed Baum's home, named the "Belmont". Baum completed construction in about 1820; the building, once lived in by Nicholas Longworth (the first) and David Sinton, is now the Taft Museum. The building is the best example of the Federal style in Cincinnati. Baum was caught in the financial upheaval of 1819–20, and he was eventually forced to deed his home back to the Bank of the United States in 1825.

Baum's leadership was instrumental, along with William Oliver, and Micajah T. Williams in developing the Maumee Valley and Port Lawrence, modern day, Toledo, Ohio.

Baum died during an influenza epidemic. He was buried in the First Presbyterian Ground. On 6 June 1853 his body was moved to Spring Grove Cemetery.

One of the cars of the Mount Adams Incline was named in his honor.

== References and notes ==
Political offices
Preceded by John S. Gano	Mayor of Cincinnati; 1807	Succeeded by Daniel Symmes
Preceded by James Findlay	Mayor of Cincinnati; 1812	Succeeded by William Stanley
