= Charles H. Thomas (sports executive) =

American sports executive

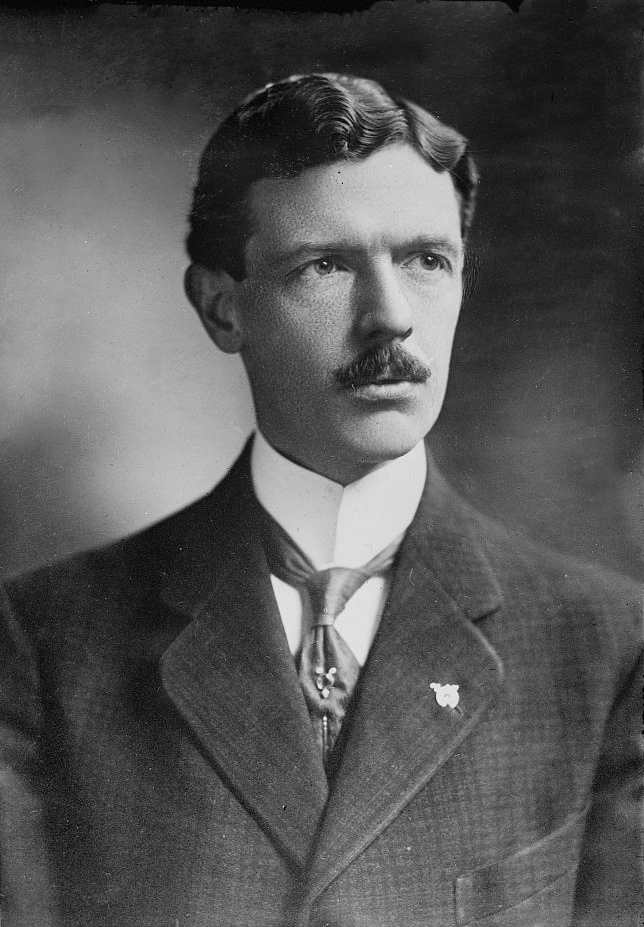
Charles H. Thomas

Charles Herbert Thomas (born November 22, 1876 Gardner, Massachusetts – died August 19, 1968, in Biscayne Park, Florida) was the president of the Chicago Cubs of the National League from 1914 through 1916.

It was under Murphy's ownership that the Cubs won the franchise's only two World Series titles, in 1907 and 1908.

After several years as Cubs owner, Murphy became a disliked figure among other owners in the National League, the press, and his players.

== Career ==
A stenographer, Thomas joined the New York Giants as assistant secretary in 1900. After Giants press agent Charles Murphy purchased the Cubs from Jim Hart in 1905, Thomas followed Murphy to Chicago and became Secretary of the Cubs.

Thomas briefly resigned his position in 1909, after a storm of bad publicity connected to his divorce: Mrs. Thomas discovered her husband cavorting with another woman, a Mrs. Helen Loker, and alleged Thomas threatened to kill her if she went public with this fact. The divorce came through, and Thomas eventually married Mrs. Loker. In 1914 Murphy appointed Thomas the club treasurer.

=== Sale of the Cubs ===
Charles Murphy sold the Cubs to Charles Phelps Taft after the 1913 season. On March 18, 1914, Taft appointed Thomas President of the Cubs. Other baseball owners objected to the appointment, alleging that Thomas was too close to the despised former owner, Murphy. The club floundered under Taft on and off the field, partly because Taft always intended to sell the team, partly because the new Federal League Chicago Whales cut into the Cubs' business. At the end of 1915 Taft announced the sale of the Cubs to Whales owner Charles Weeghman. Upon formal transfer of the team ownership (January 20, 1916) Thomas resigned as club president.

=== Later career ===
After leaving the Cubs, Thomas stayed in baseball, first as an agent for Wilson Sporting Goods, then as secretary of the minor league Columbus (Ohio) Senators. In 1940 he was selling trailers in Columbus.
