= Portrait of a Young Woman with a Fan =

1633 painting by Rembrandt

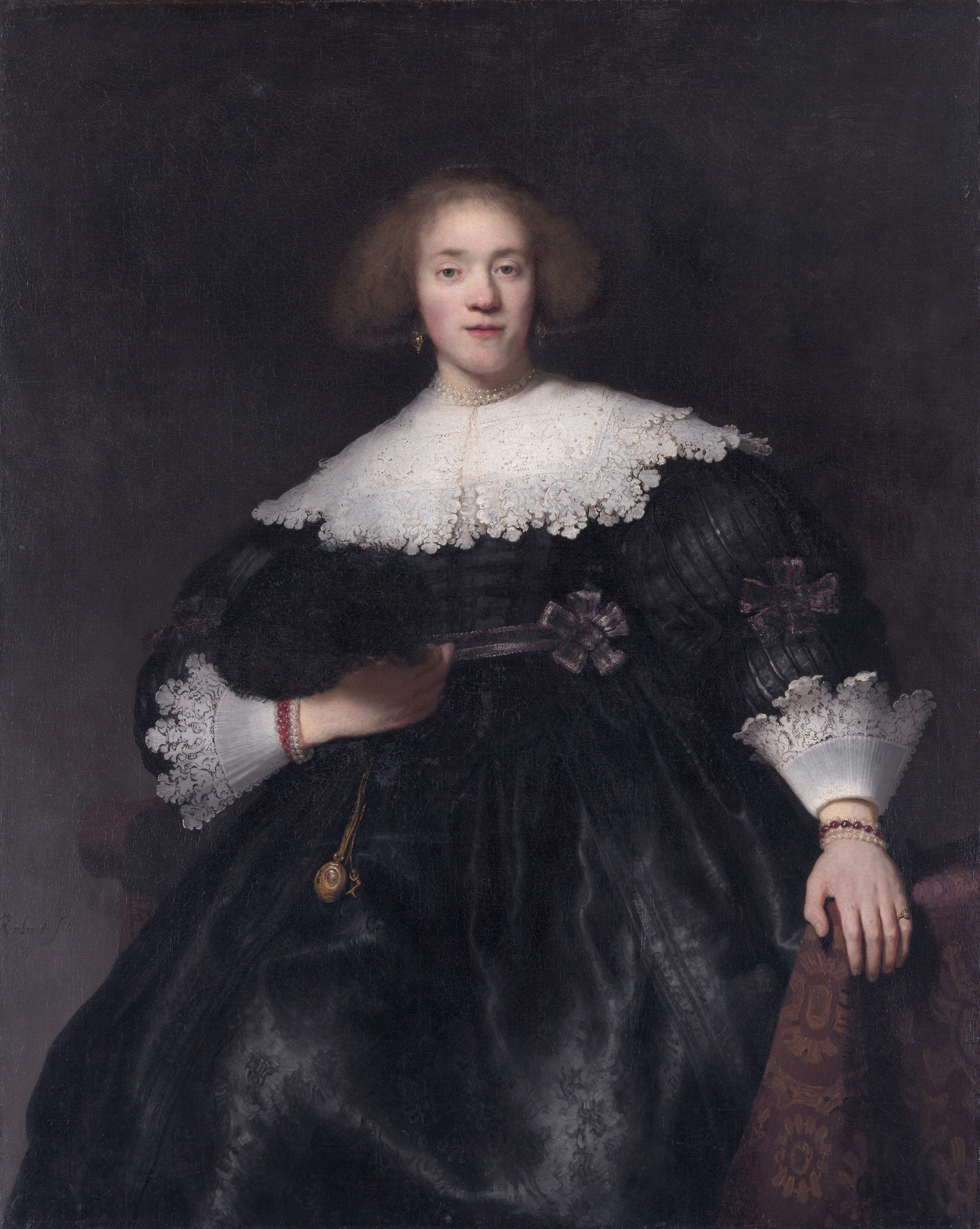
- Artist: Rembrandt
- Year: 1633
- Medium: oil paint, canvas
- Dimensions: 125.7 cm (49.5 in) × 101 cm (40 in)
- Location: Metropolitan Museum of Art
- Accession: 43.125

Portrait of a Young Woman with a Fan is a 1633 portrait painting by Rembrandt. It shows a woman holding a fan, pendant to Portrait of a Man Rising from His Chair. It is in the collection of the Metropolitan Museum of Art.

== Description ==
Rembrandt created this painting as a pendant to the Taft Museum's portrait of a man, probably as a wedding pendant. Only a few pairs of pendant portraits by Rembrandt have survived. This half of the pair came into the collection via the Helen Swift Neilson bequest in 1945.

This painting was documented by Hofstede de Groot in 1914, who wrote; "881. A YOUNG LADY WITH A FAN. Bode 253; Dut. 285; Wb. 217; B.-HdG. 101. Three-quarter length; life size. She sits, seen in full face, in an arm-chair, and looks straight out of the picture. She holds her right hand, grasping a black feather fan by its gold chain, to her bosom; her left hand rests on a table beside her to the right. She wears a black silk gown with puffed and slashed sleeves, a triple close-fitting lace collar and lace wristbands. Round her neck is a double string of pearls; on both arms are strings of pearls and a ruby bracelet; there are pearls in her ears. She has dull fair curly hair and a fresh complexion. The light falls from the left foreground. Painted about 1633. [Possibly pendant to 736.] Canvas, 50 1/2 inches by 40 inches. Mentioned by Bode, p. 459; Dutuit, p. 46; Michel, p. 559 [433]. Exhibited at the British Institution, London, 1822, No. 13; at the Royal Academy Winter Exhibition, London, 1899, No. 55. In the collection of Lord Leconfield, Petworth House."

The painting was included in most Rembrandt catalogs of the 20th-century, and the Rembrandt Research Project agrees with Hofstede de Groot's pairing of this painting with the Taft Museum's portrait. According to Walter Liedtke, the features of this woman closely resemble another portrait in the Museum of Fine Arts, Houston.

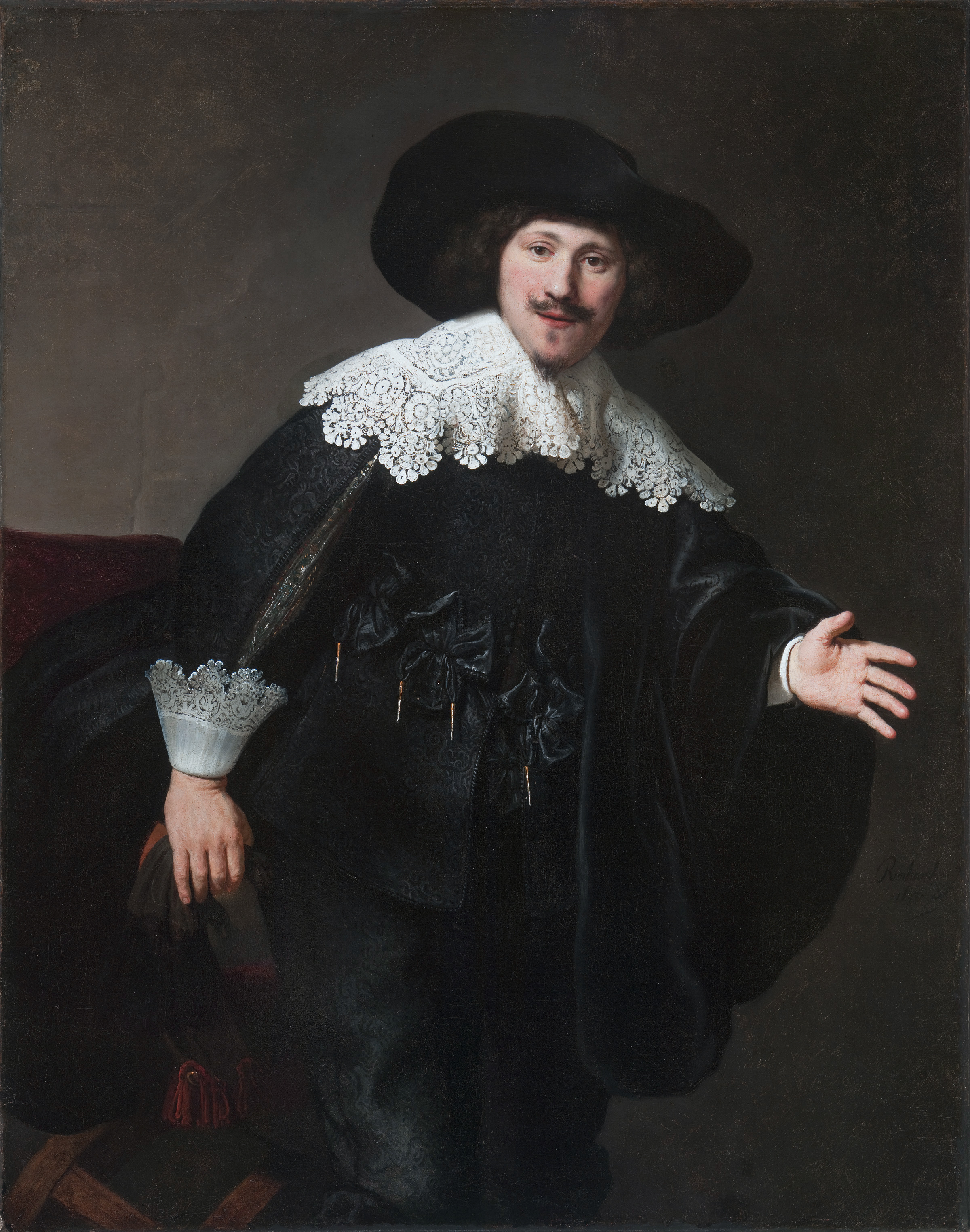
The man's portrait hangs on the left.

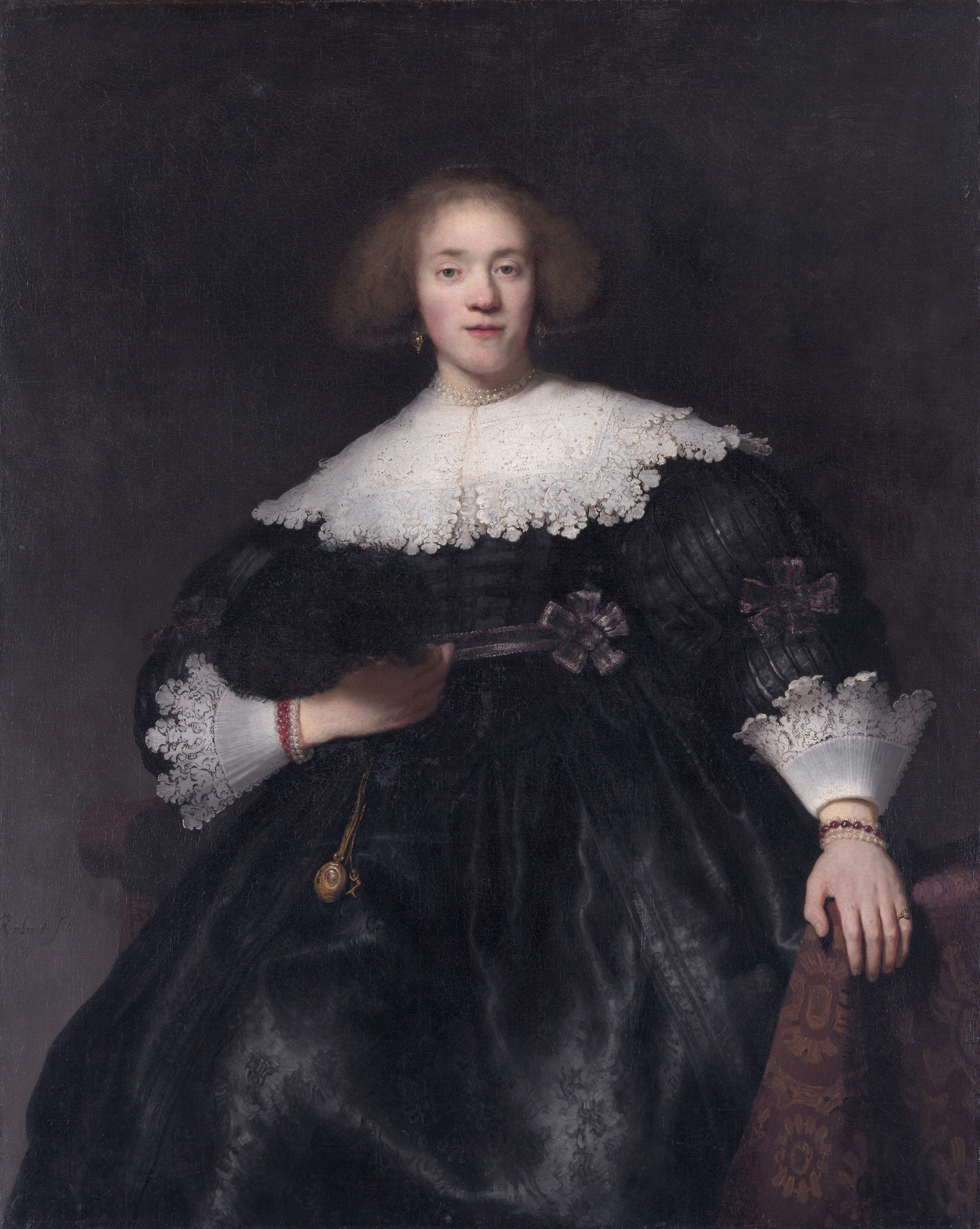
The woman's portrait hangs on the right.

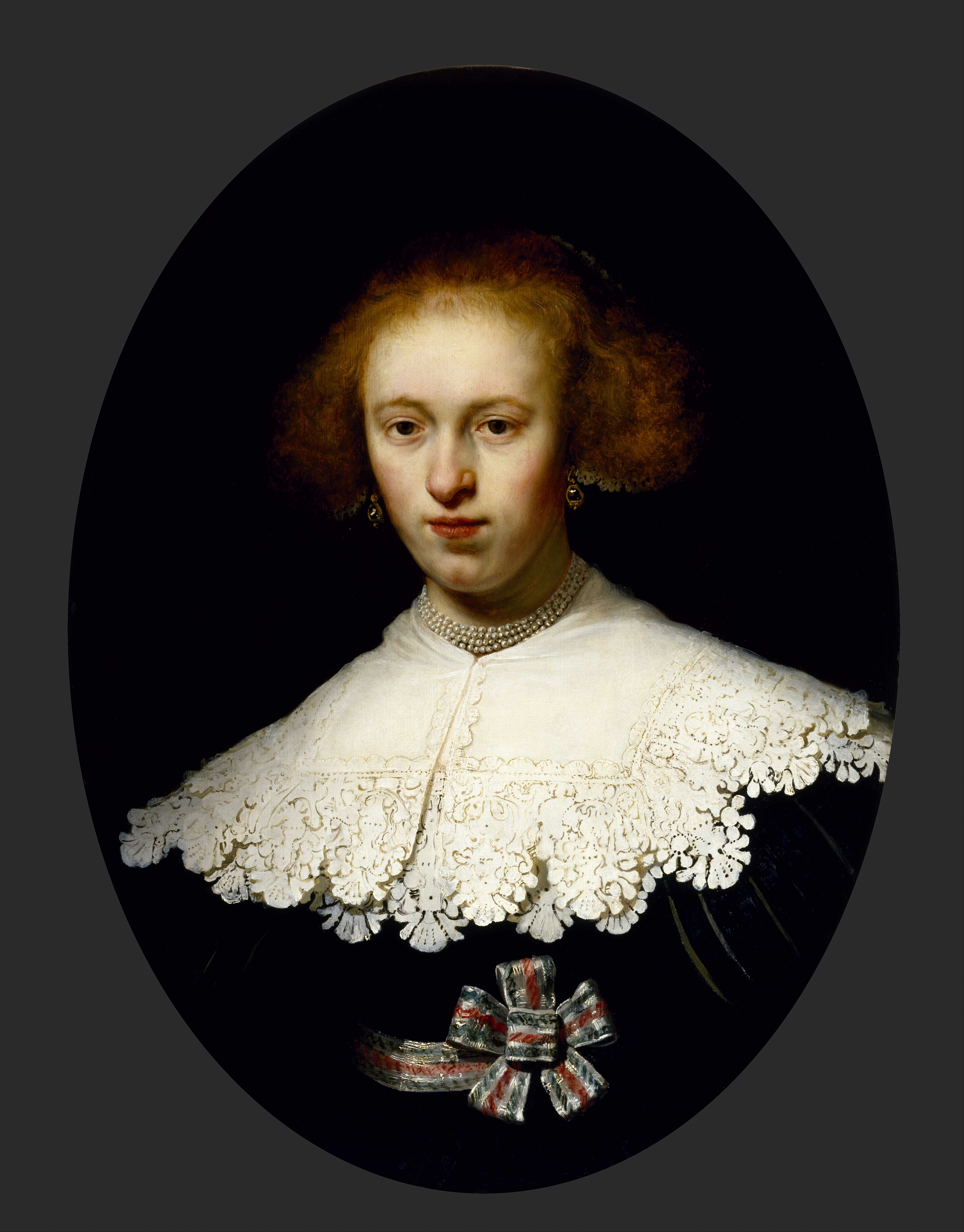
Houston painting (no pendant known)
