= David Sinton =

American politician

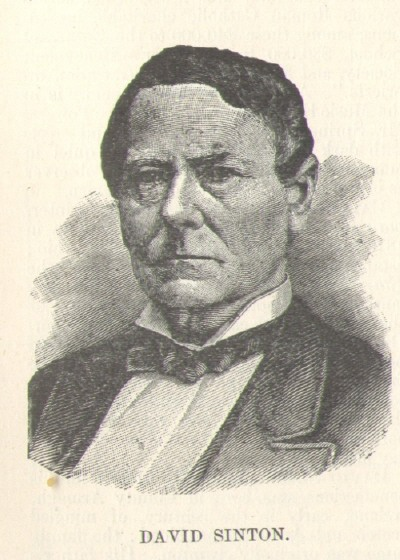
- Born: June 26, 1808; County Armagh, Ireland
- Died: August 31, 1900 (aged 92); Cincinnati, Ohio, U.S.
- Occupation: Industrialist
- Spouse: Jane Ellison (died 1853)
- Children: Annie Sinton-Taft
- Parent(s): John Sinton; Mary McDonnell
- Relatives: Charles Phelps Taft (son-in-law)

David Sinton (26 June 1808 – 31 August 1900) was an Irish-born American pig-iron industrialist, born in County Armagh, Ireland, who became one of the wealthiest people in America.

== Early life ==
Sinton was the son of linen manufacturer John Sinton, of Unshinagh, a Quaker (he was a cousin of Irish Quaker industrialist brothers Thomas Sinton and John Sinton), and Mary McDonnell.

In 1811, the family came to America from Ireland and settled in Pittsburgh when he was three years of age. Sinton had one brother (Dr. William Sinton, a physician) and two sisters (Isabella Eliza, who never left Ireland and Sarah, who married John Sparks, a banker).

== Career ==
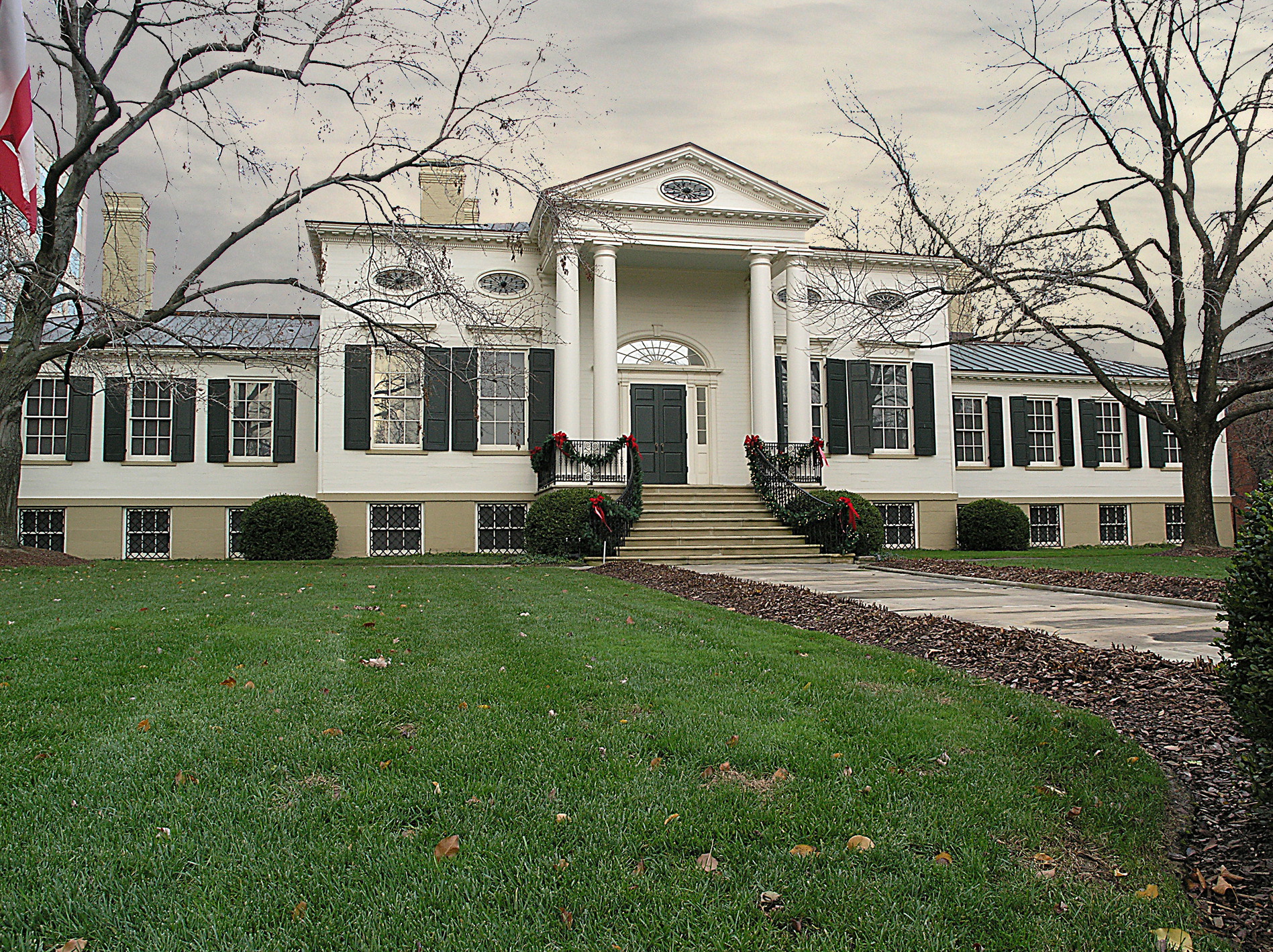
David Sinton's home;"one of the finest examples of Federal architecture in the Palladian style in the country."

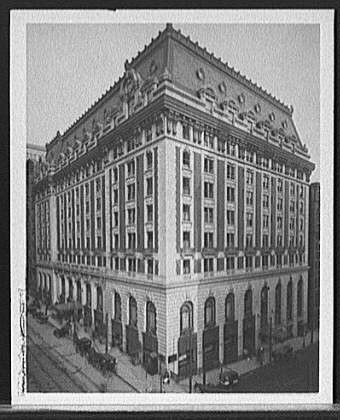
The Sinton Hotel, Cincinnati

In the 1830s, Sinton was a manager of the ironworks at Hanging Rock, Ohio. In 1846, he managed to become the owner and made his headquarters in Cincinnati.

A man of "irregular education", his business interests centered on the manufacture of iron; his furnaces were in Lawrence County, Ohio. Much of his fortune was made by stockpiling pig iron, waiting for the American Civil War, and selling that iron on at inflated prices. He eventually acquired the majority of stock in the Eureka Company, and at the time that Oxmoor merged with the DeBardeleben Coal and Iron Company, he owned most of Oxmoor.

He was described as "a large, strong person with strong common sense, and therefore moves solely on the solid foundation of facts." His residence, at Cincinnati, was the old Longworth mansion on Pike Street, built by Martin Baum early in the 19th century. Mr. Sinton's only surviving child, Annie, was the wife of Charles Phelps Taft, editor of the Times-Star and brother of William Howard Taft; Sinton money was said to have financed the presidential bid.

== Personal life ==
Sinton married Jane Ellison (1826–1853), a daughter of John Ellison (1779–1829), at Union Landing, Ohio. They had two children:

- Edward Sinton (1848-1869)

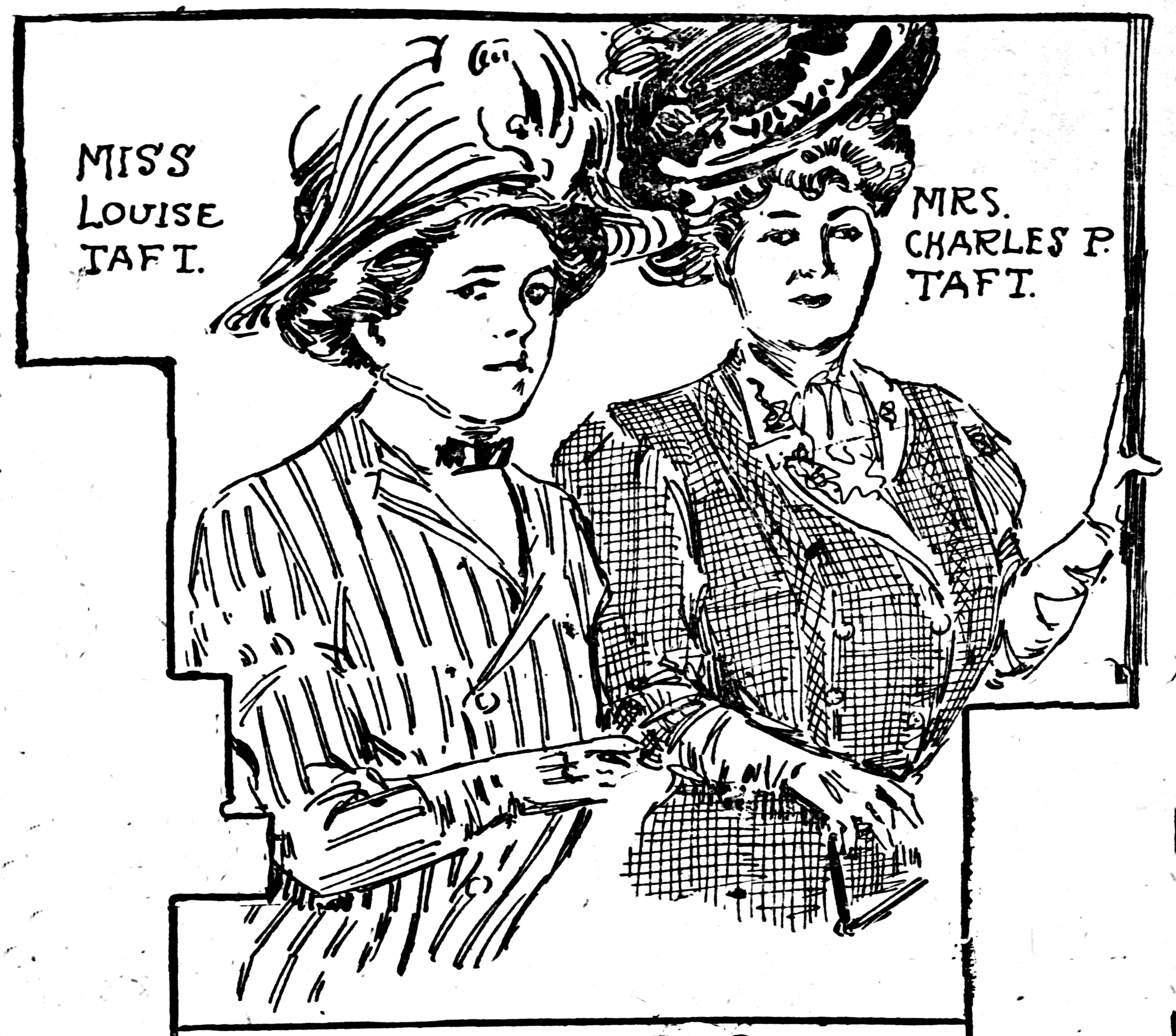
1908 drawing by Marguerite Martyn of Louise Taft, left, and Anna Sinton Taft, right

- Anna Sinton (1850-1931), who married U.S. Representative Charles Phelps Taft (1843–1929), the older brother of William Howard Taft, the 27th President of the United States and 10th Chief Justice of the United States.

Sinton died on August 31, 1900, in Cincinnati, Ohio. Upon his death, he left $20,000,000 (the 2011 equivalent of this is about $500,000,000) to his daughter; he was Ohio's richest man at the time. His home is now the Taft Museum of Art.

=== Descendants ===
Through his daughter Anna, he was the grandfather of Jane Taft Ingalls (1874–1962), David Sinton Taft (1876–1891), Anna Louise Taft Semple (1879–1961), and Charles Howard Taft (1885–1931). He was the great-grandfather of First World War flying ace David Sinton Ingalls.

=== Legacy ===
During his lifetime, Sinton was philanthropic in his donations to the arts and the Presbyterian church, yet his own father's grave was not marked with a headstone; "but David Sinton is wiser in his generation than they who seek to stab his character in such a paragraph [as erecting an ornate sepulcher]. He is one of God's noblemen."

The town of Sinton, Texas, is named in his honor (given that he was the majority stock holder in Coleman-Fulton Pasture Company).
