= Johannes Pieter de Frey =

Dutch printmaker, painter and publisher (1770-1834)

- Born: 1 February 1770; Amsterdam
- Died: 1834 (aged 63–64); Paris

Johannes Pieter de Frey or Freij (1 February 1770 – 1834) was a Dutch printmaker, painter and publisher.

Frey was born in Amsterdam as the younger brother of the painters Maria Christina and Aletta de Frey. The painter Jacobus Johannes Lauwers lived in his house a short while and later married Maria Christina. He became the teacher of Johannes and Aletta. He became known for his engravings of works of 17th-century painters. Frey died in Paris.

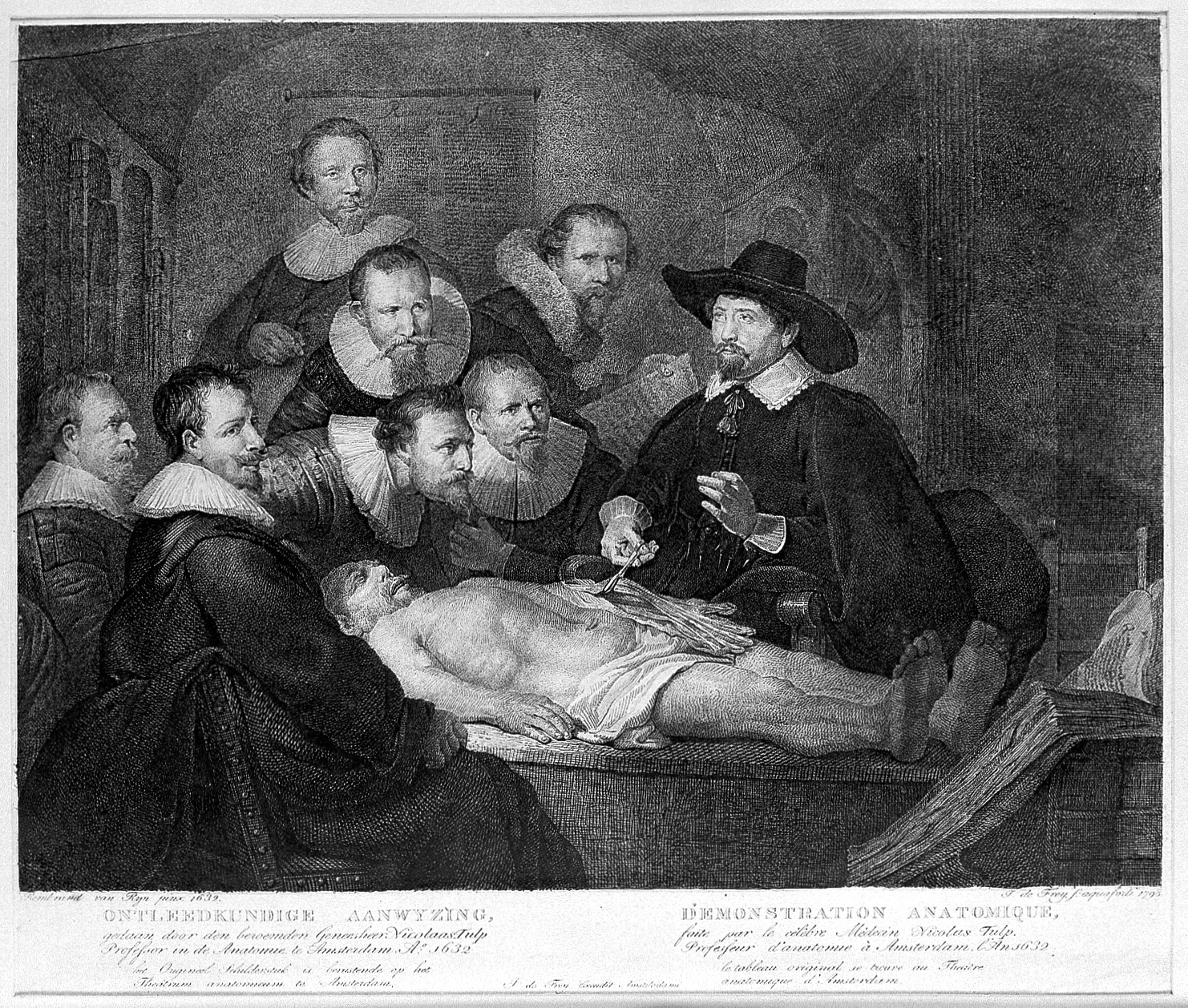
Engraving of Rembrandt's The Anatomy Lesson of Dr. Nicolaes Tulp

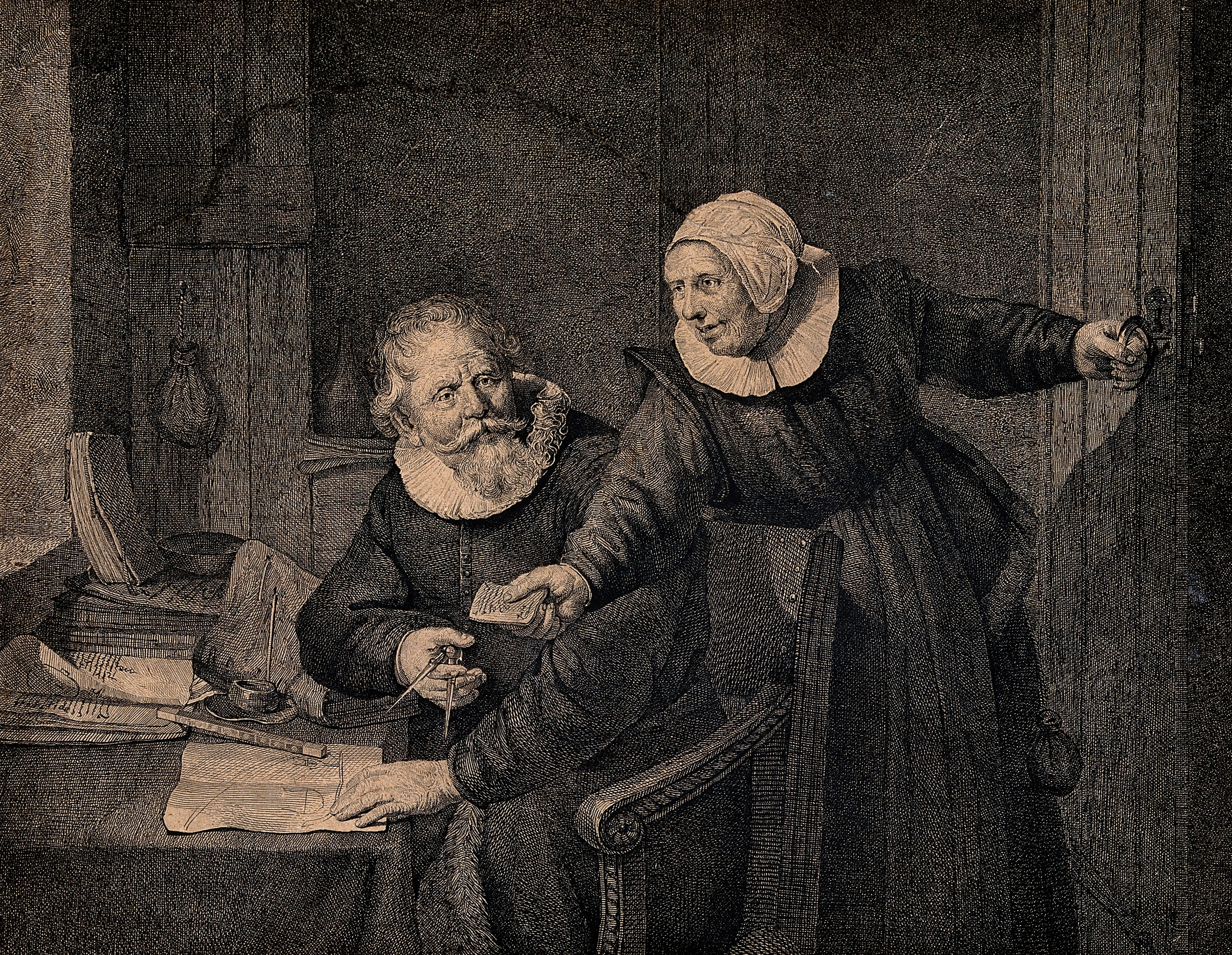
Engraving of Rembrandt's The Shipbuilder and his Wife
