= William B. Shattuc =

American politician

William Bunn Shattuc
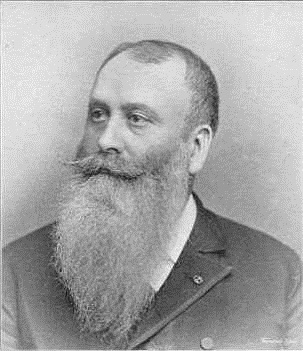

Member of the U.S. House of Representatives from Ohio's 1st district
- In office March 4, 1897 – March 3, 1903
- Preceded by: Charles Phelps Taft
- Succeeded by: Nicholas Longworth

Member of the Ohio Senate from the 1st district
- In office January 6, 1896 – January 2, 1898 Serving with Charles Fleischmann, John W. Herron, Adolph Pluemer
- Preceded by: Frank Kirchner, Samuel W. Ramp, Herman H. Rothert
- Succeeded by: Alfred M. Cohen, J. W. Harper, C. D. Robertson, Lewis Voight

Personal details
- Born: June 11, 1841 North Hector, New York
- Died: July 13, 1911 (aged 70) Cincinnati, Ohio
- Resting place: Spring Grove Cemetery
- Party: Republican

William Bunn Shattuc (June 11, 1841 – July 13, 1911) was a U.S. representative from Ohio for three terms from 1897 to 1903.

== Biography ==
William Shattuc was born in Hector, New York but Shattuc moved to Ohio in 1852 with his parents, who settled near Sandusky.

During the American Civil War, Shattuc enlisted in Company I, 2nd Ohio Cavalry, August 13, 1861, with a commission as a second lieutenant.

He mustered out February 21, 1863, as a first lieutenant. He served as assistant and afterward general passenger agent of the Ohio and Mississippi Railway Company from 1865 to 1894 and served as member of the State senate in 1895.

=== Congress ===
Shattuc was elected as a Republican to the Fifty-fifth, Fifty-sixth and Fifty-seventh Congresses (March 4, 1897 – March 3, 1903).

He served as chairman of the Committee on Immigration and Naturalization (Fifty-sixth and Fifty-seventh Congresses) but was not a candidate for renomination in 1902.

=== Death ===
He died in Madisonville, near Cincinnati, Ohio, July 13, 1911 and was interred in Spring Grove Cemetery, Cincinnati, Ohio.

U.S. House of Representatives
Preceded by Charles P. Taft	Member of the U.S. House of Representatives from Ohio's 1st congressional district 1897-1903	Succeeded by Nicholas Longworth
