= Taft Museum of Art =

Historic house in Ohio, United States

- Baum-Taft House
- U.S. National Register of Historic Places
- U.S. National Historic Landmark
- U.S. Historic district – Contributing property
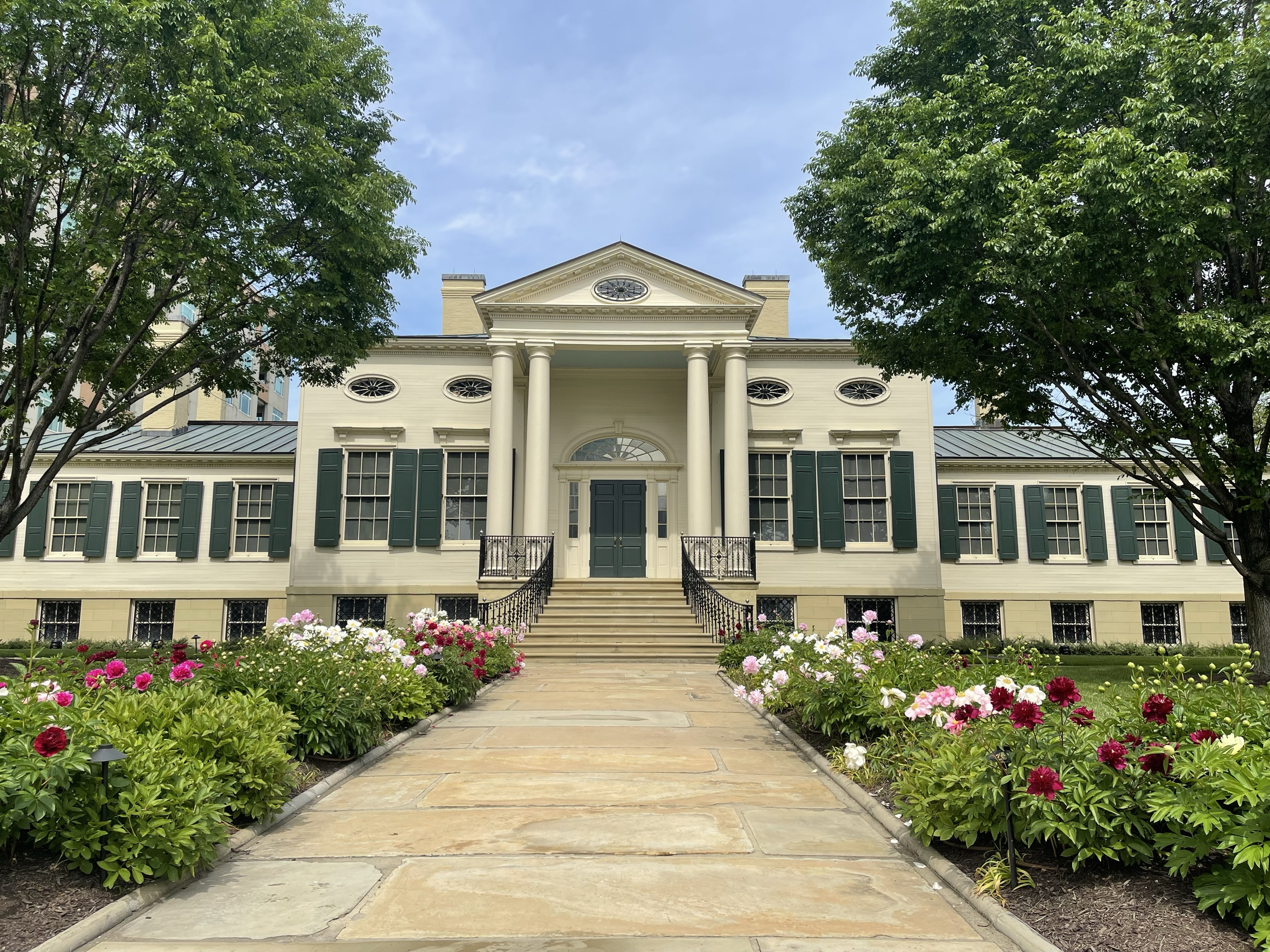
- Taft Museum of Art in 2004

- Location within Ohio Location within the United States
- Location: Cincinnati, Ohio
- Coordinates: 39°6′9″N 84°30′12″W
- Built: 1820
- Architectural style: Federal
- NRHP reference No.: 73001470
- Added to NRHP: January 29, 1973

The Taft Museum of Art is a fine art collection in Cincinnati, Ohio. It occupies the 200-year-old historic house at 316 Pike Street. The house – the oldest domestic wooden structure in downtown Cincinnati – was built about 1820 and housed several prominent Cincinnatians, including Martin Baum, Nicholas Longworth, David Sinton, Anna Sinton Taft and Charles Phelps Taft. It is on the National Register of Historic Places listings, and is a contributing property to the Lytle Park Historic District.

== Residents ==
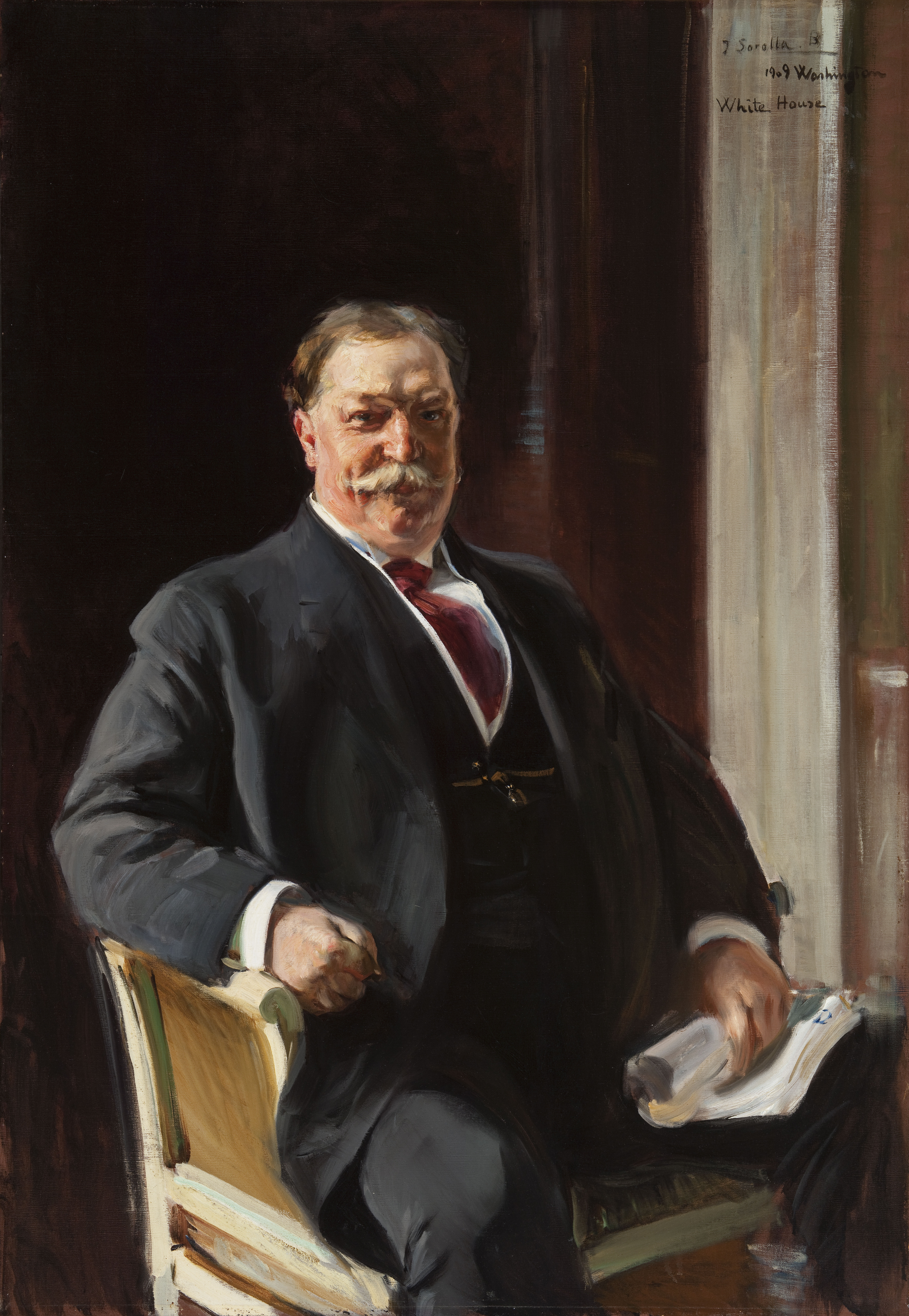
Portrait of Mr. Taft, by Joaquin Sorolla (1909)

The Taft house was first built for Martin Baum in 1820 and then was the residence of Nicholas Longworth. The building was designated a National Historic Landmark in 1976, in honor of the murals on its walls that were painted by Robert S. Duncanson under the commission of Nicholas Longworth. Robert S. Duncanson painted the series of eight large-scale landscapes directly on the plaster walls of the art patron and horticulturist Nicholas Longworth's home between 1851 and 1852. Second to the Taft house itself, the murals – recognized as the most significant pre–Civil War domestic murals in the U.S. – are one of the museum's largest pieces of art. Duncanson was also one of the first widely known Black American artists to rise to international acclaim.

After Longworth's residency, the house was purchased by David Sinton, father of museum co-founder Anna Sinton Taft. David Sinton lived in the house with his daughter Anna, who married Charles Phelps Taft, the half-brother of President William Howard Taft. The Tafts lived in the house from 1873 until their respective deaths in 1931 and 1929. William H. Taft accepted his presidential nomination there from its portico in 1908 adding to its significance in the nation's public life. The Tafts were avid art collectors. They bequeathed their home and the collection of art that filled it to the people of Cincinnati in 1927. In the Tafts' deed of gift they stated, "We desire to devote our collection of pictures, porcelains, and other works of art to the people of Cincinnati in such a manner that they may be readily available for all." The Taft Museum opened to the public on November 29, 1932.

== Permanent collection ==
The museum's collections include European old master paintings, with works by Jean-Baptiste-Camille Corot, Thomas Gainsborough, Frans Hals, Jean Auguste Dominique Ingres, Rembrandt van Rijn, Adriaen van Ostade, and J. M. W. Turner, among others, and 19th-century American paintings, including the well-known Duncanson murals. The galleries in the historic house also include Chinese porcelains, European decorative arts, Limoges enamels, watches, sculptures, and furniture.

Collection highlights include:

- Joaquin Sorolla, Portrait of Mr. Taft, President of the United States, 1909.
- Frank Duveneck, The Cobbler's Apprentice, 1877.
- Henry Farny, Song of the Talking Wire, 1904.
- Rembrandt van Rijn, Portrait of a Man Rising from His Chair, 1633.
- J. M. W. Turner, Europa and the Bull, ca. 1840–50.
- James Abbott McNeill Whistler, At the Piano, 1858–59.
- Anonymous author of the 13th century, Virgin and Child, from Paris, Abbey of Saint-Denis, ca. 1260–80.
- Olivuccio di Ciccarello, Madonna nursing the Child with Saints.
- Frans Hals, Portrait of Seated Man Holding Hat.
- Gerard Terborch, Sleeping Soldier.
- Jeronymus Van Diest, Sailboats On River with Fisherman.
- Corot, Evening:Festival of Pan.
- Charles Daubigny, Evening on Oise.
- An appreciable collection of Limoges enamel paintings.

The museum reopened in May 2004 after an extensive renovation and expansion including a museum shop, the Carl H. Lindner Family Café, and a lecture and performance space, Luther Hall.

== See also ==
- William Howard Taft National Historic Site
- List of National Historic Landmarks in Ohio
