= The Cobbler's Apprentice =

1877 painting by Frank Duveneck

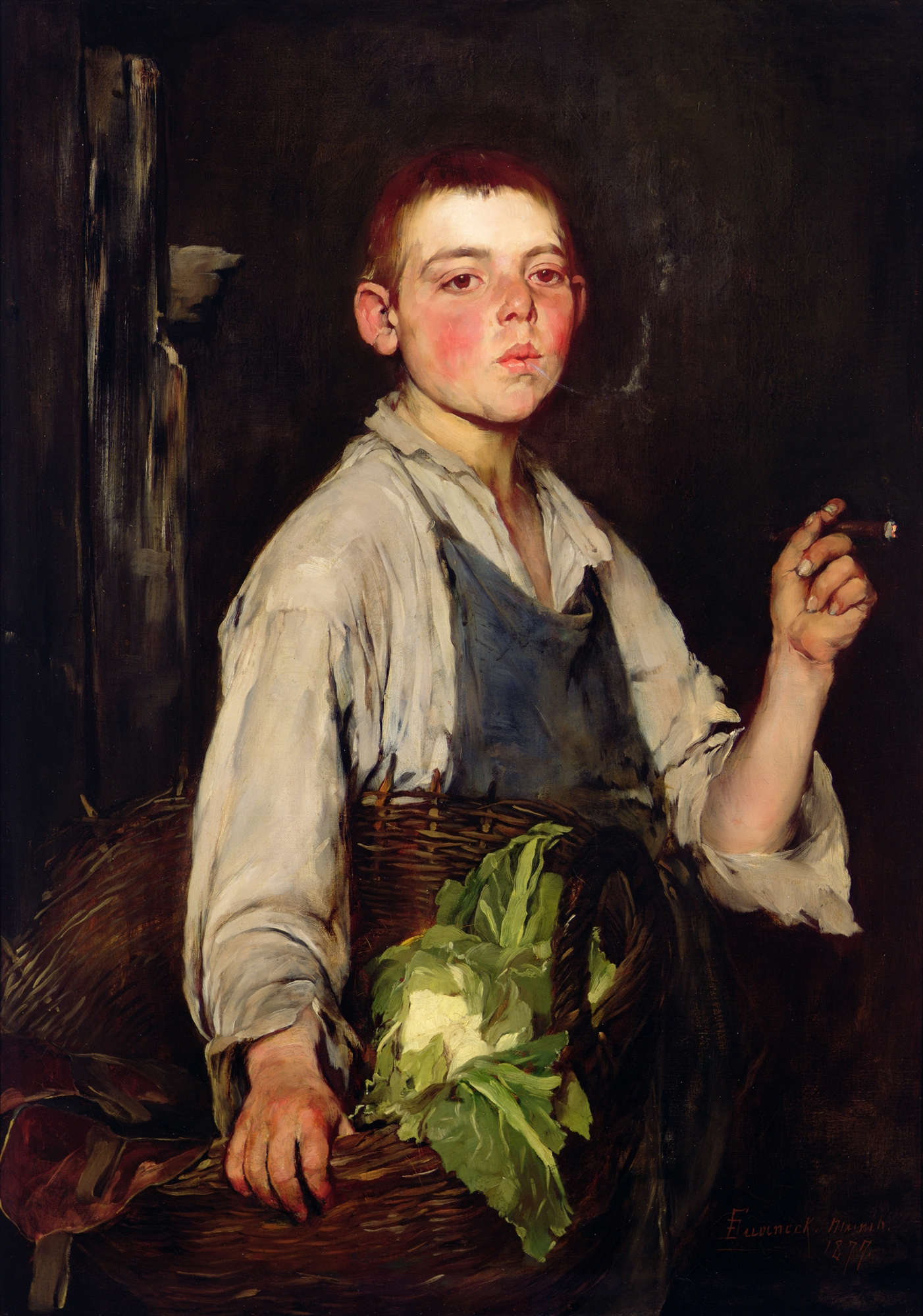

The Cobbler's Apprentice is a painting by the American painter Frank Duveneck, painted in 1877. It hangs in the Taft Museum of Art of Cincinnati, Ohio, United States. The oil on canvas portrait measures 38.5 by 26.75 inches (978 mm × 679 mm) and it is signed by the artist.

Duveneck painted The Cobbler's Apprentice in Munich, Germany, where at the time he was regarded as a leading American artist.

== Description ==
The subject of The Cobbler's Apprentice is a boy, shown three-quarters-length, and turned three quarters to the right. He is holding a large basket to his right side while he blows smoke from a cigar held in his left hand.

== Provenance ==
The painting was sold in Munich for $25 to one Mr. von Hessling, the American Vice Consul, was for a time owned by Mr. Joseph Stransky of New York; and it was finally acquired into the collection of Mr. Charles Phelps Taft.

== In popular culture ==
The painting was parodied in the 2011 mural The Cobbler's Apprentice Plays Ball on The Banks near the Great American Ball Park. Instead of holding a cigar and a basket of vegetables, the boy now appears holding a baseball bat.
