= Portrait of a Man Rising from His Chair =

1633 painting by Rembrandt

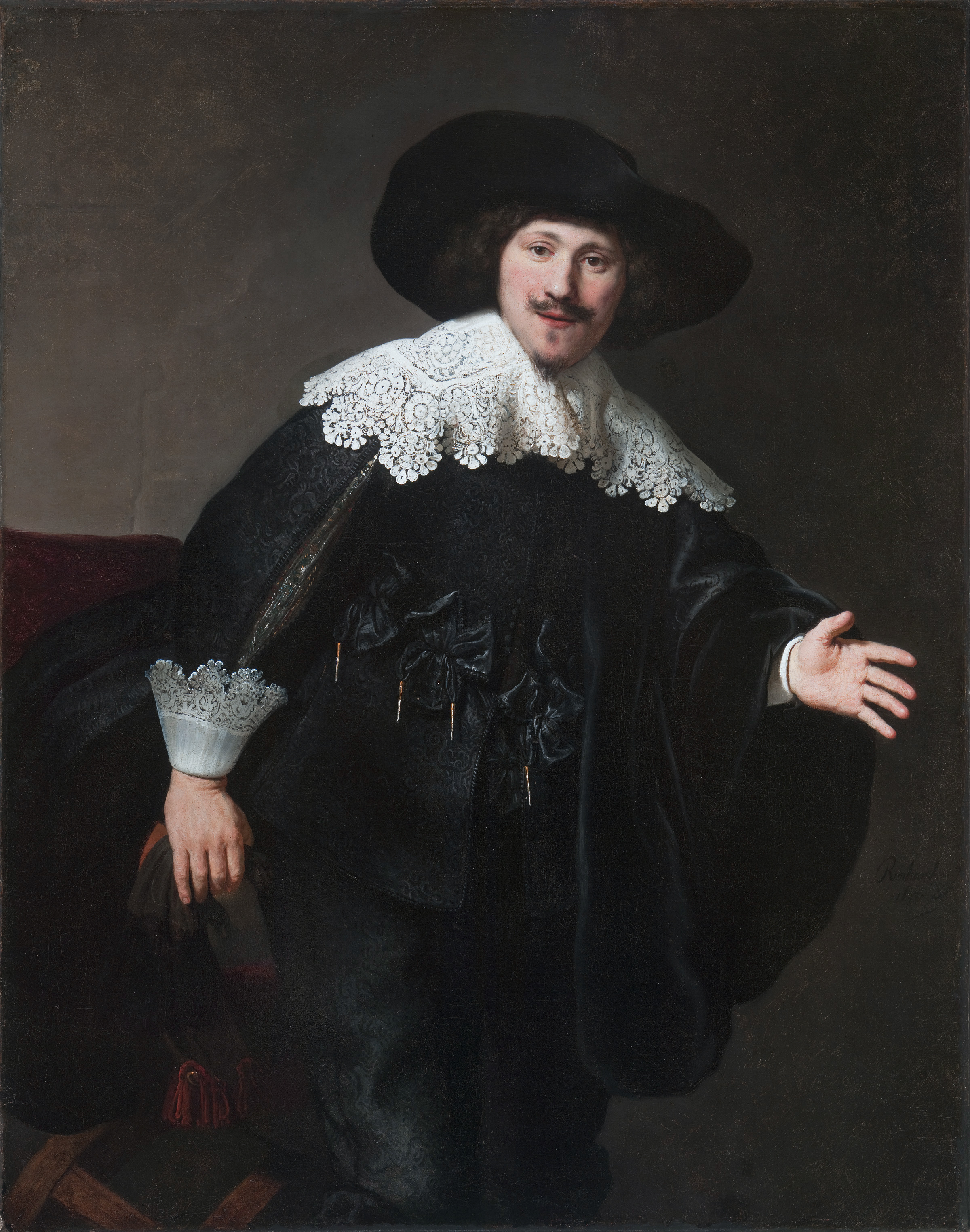
- Artist: Rembrandt
- Year: 1633
- Medium: Oil on canvas
- Dimensions: 124.1 cm × 98.4 cm (48.9 in × 38.7 in)
- Location: Taft Museum of Art; Cincinnati

Portrait of a Man Rising from His Chair is a painting by the Dutch painter Rembrandt, painted in 1633. It hangs in the Taft Museum of Art of Cincinnati, Ohio, United States. The oil-on-canvas portrait measures 124 by 99 centimetres (49 in × 39 in). It is signed and dated 1633, and there is no doubt of its authenticity.

== Description ==
The pose of the wealthy subject is unusually animated, as he is rising, perhaps to greet a visitor or to introduce him to his wife depicted in a companion painting. The portrait and its pendant, Portrait of a Young Woman with a Fan, have been separated since 1793. Occasional exhibitions have reunited the pair. Wilhelm von Bode was the first one to notice the similarities in size and composition and presented the man and woman as pendants in his catalogue of Rembrandt paintings in 1897.

== Provenance ==
The painting was purchased by Charles P. Taft from the Pourtales family of Paris, who had it in their private gallery for more than 100 years. Although the price paid for the picture was not made public, it was reported in the London Times at the time of the purchase (ca. 1909) that it cost $500,000.

== See also ==
- List of paintings by Rembrandt
