= Lake Orion Historic District =

- U.S. National Register of Historic Places
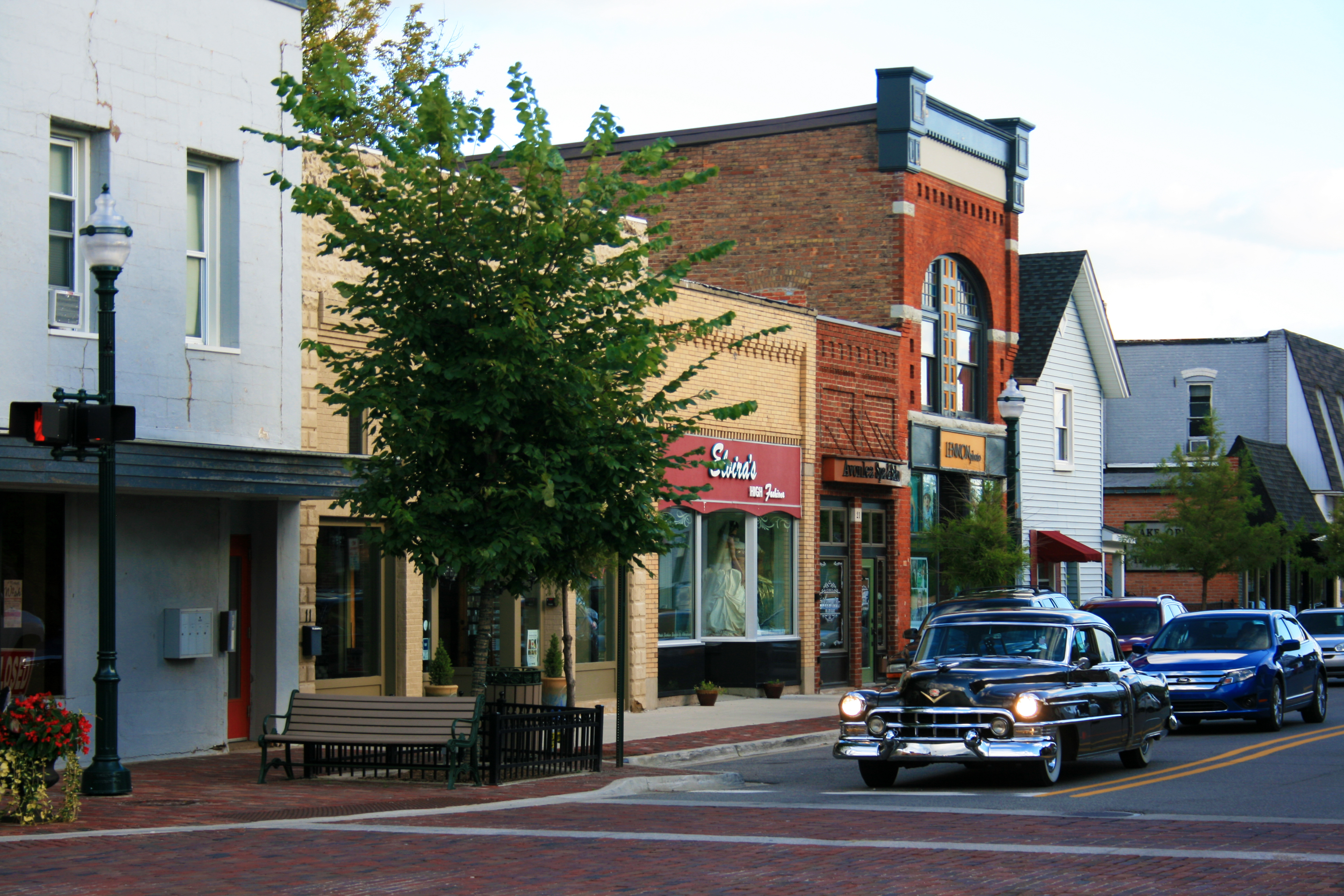
- Broadway and Flint, looking south
- Interactive map
- Location: Roughly bounded by Elizabeth St., Hauxwell Dr., Front St., and Lapeer St., Lake Orion, Michigan
- Coordinates: 42°47′10″N 83°14′19″W
- Area: 57.1 acres (23.1 ha)
- Built: 1829
- Architectural style: Greek Revival, Queen Anne, et al.
- NRHP reference No.: 06000722
- Added to NRHP: August 23, 2006

Lake Orion Historic District is a commercial and residential historic district located in Lake Orion, Michigan and roughly bounded by Elizabeth Street, Hauxwell Drive, Front Street, and Lapeer Street. It was listed on the National Register of Historic Places in 2006.

== History ==
Lake Orion was first settled in the 1820s, and a number of mills were in place along Paint Creek. The mills flourished, attracting more settlers, and the village of Orion was platted in 1838. The first general store was opened that year, and a second added in 1843. By 1857, there were nearly two dozen businesses in the settlement. Orion was incorporated as a village in 1859, but a devastating 1862 fire that destroyed the business district caused the charter to be repealed. The downtown was quickly rebuilt, and the village reincorporated in 1869.

In 1872, the Detroit & Bay City Railroad was completed through Orion. This stimulated local businesses and gave an outlet to the local agricultural market, with Orion as a primary shipping hub. It also gave visitors from Detroit easy access to Lake Orion, setting up the area as a resort hub. Lake Orion became one of the most popular resorts in southeastern Michigan. In addition to the 1862 fire, fires in 1874, 1894, 1901, and 1902 destroyed buildings in Lake Orion's downtown, resulting in infill of newer buildings. While the commercial section of the village grew, the residential section did also, but without the disastrous fires, resulting in a full range of houses existing, dating from the 1840s through the 1950s.

At the onset of the twentieth century, the rise of the automobile contributed to a tremendous growth in Oakland County and in Lake Orion. Although the newest parts of the residential section of Lake Orion are not included in the historic district, the growth and mobility did change the village. The resort community declined in the twentieth century, and the new alignment of M-24 to bypass the downtown meant fewer shoppers for the village's commercial core. Orion began to change to a suburban community, but with an intact historic core.

== Description ==
The Lake Orion Historic District includes about twenty-six blocks in the historic core of Lake Orion surrounding the intersection of Broadway and Flint Street, which was historically the commercial center of the village. The historic district includes a total of 280 properties, of which 218 contribute to the historic nature of the district. The commercial portion of the district generally contains brick one- or two-story buildings, spanning Commercial Italianate, Romanesque Revival, Moderne, Commercial Brick styles. At the edges of the commercial district, a number of formerly residential buildings have been converted to commercial uses. The surrounding residential area of the district consists primarily of wood-frame houses built between the mid-nineteenth century and the mid-twentieth century. The oldest homes in the historic district are evenly dispersed throughout the area, with most early residents owning multiple lots surrounding their homes. As the village grew, newer homes began to fill in the lots between the original homes, with the result that many architectural styles are intermixed.

== See also ==
- National Register of Historic Places listings in Oakland County, Michigan
