= Charles Torrey House =

- U.S. National Register of Historic Places
- Michigan State Historic Site
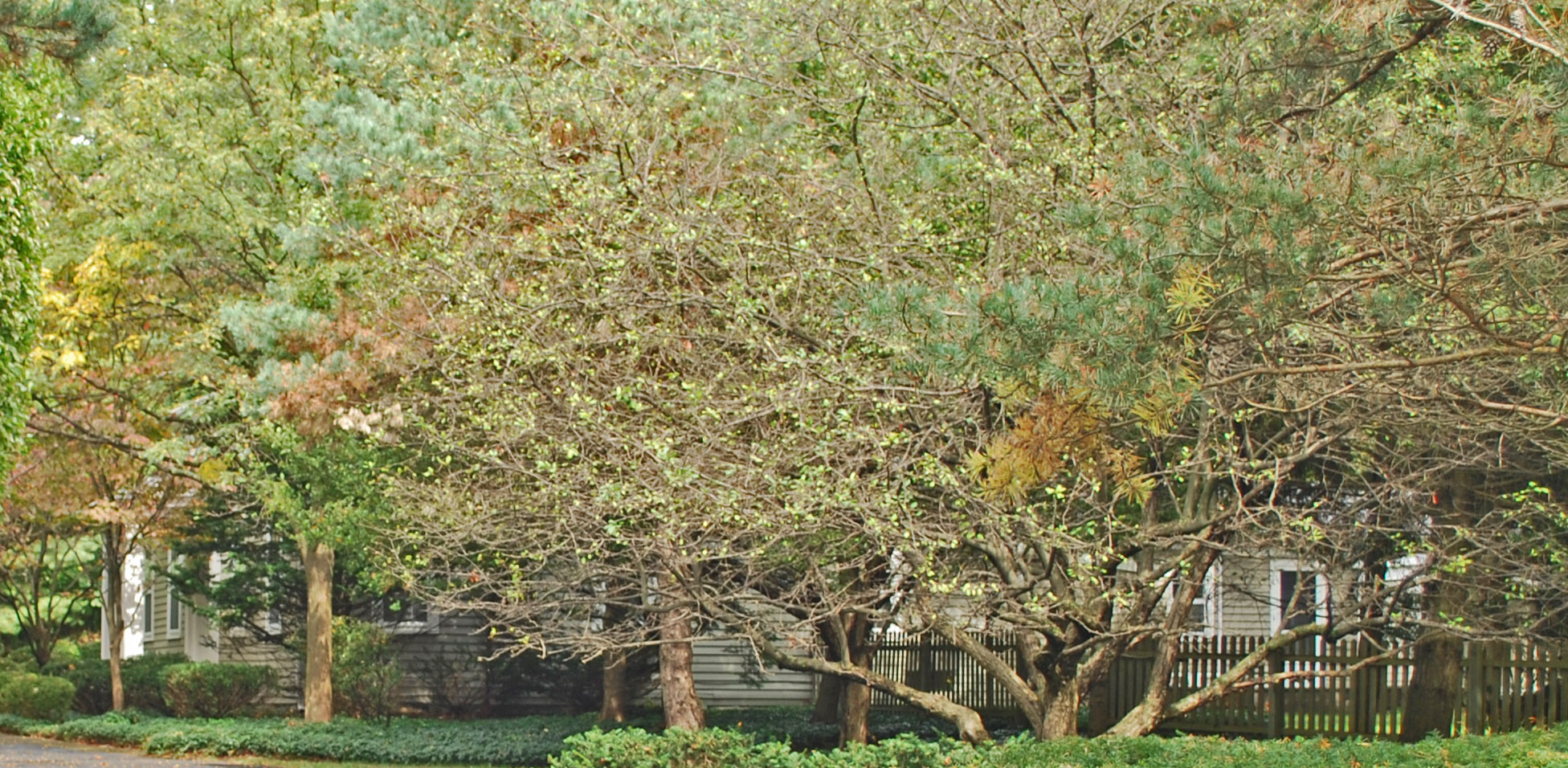
- Interactive map
- Location: 1141 Foxwood Ct., Birmingham, Michigan
- Coordinates: 42°36′58″N 83°13′23″W
- Area: 2.8 acres (1.1 ha)
- Built: 1848
- Architectural style: Greek Revival
- NRHP reference No.: 92000585
- Added to NRHP: May 21, 1992

The Charles Torrey House is a single-family house located at 1141 Foxwood Court in Birmingham, Michigan. It was listed on the National Register of Historic Places in 1992.

== History ==
Charles Torrey was born in 1804 near in Madison County, New York. In 1830, he married Mary Van De Water. In 1833, the Torreys settled in Auburn, Michigan (now part of Auburn Hills, and in 1834 purchased this section of land in Bloomfield Township. Charles Torrey, however, had other vocations, as a carpenter and cabinet maker, and eventually as a sawmill owner, and he elected to continue living in Auburn. The family stayed there until 1848, when they sold their house there and moved to the farm. This was likely the year that the house was built on the property, although the sections of the house that are now in the rear may pre-date 1848. Charles and Mary Torrey lived here until Mary's death in 1879. In 1881, Charles divided his property among his three daughters, but continued to live in the house until 1883, when he moved in with his daughter Elmira and her husband Philander Walton.

Charles Torrey died in 1891, and in 1892 Philander Walton purchased the Charles Torrey farmstead from Torrey's youngest daughter, Theresa Torrey Scott, who lived out of state. Elmira Walton died in 1897, and in 1902 Philander Walton moved into the Torrey farmstead for the summer, maintaining a residence in Pontiac for the winter. Walton died in 1906, passing the farmstead to his daughter Alice Walton Howard. She sold the Torrey farm to real estate speculator William Hendrie in 1916, who used it as a weekend retreat. He later subdivided the surrounding land, and by 1986 the house had only a 2.6 acre parcel associated with it.

== Description ==
The Charles Torrey House is a 1-1/2 story post-and-beam Greek Revival house with a rear ell. The main section is symmetrical, and five bays wide. There is a central entry portico supported by square Doric columns. The entry door is flanked with triple light sidelights and topped with a transom. Two six-over-six, double-hung windows are on each side of the door. Five frieze windows are above.

On the inside, the entryway leads to a vestibule, with a formal parlor to one side and an informal parlor to the other. The dining room, containing the stairs to the second story, is behind. Two bedrooms and a bathroom are upstairs.

== See also ==
- National Register of Historic Places listings in Oakland County, Michigan
