= Thomas W. and Margaret Taliaferro House =

- U.S. National Register of Historic Places
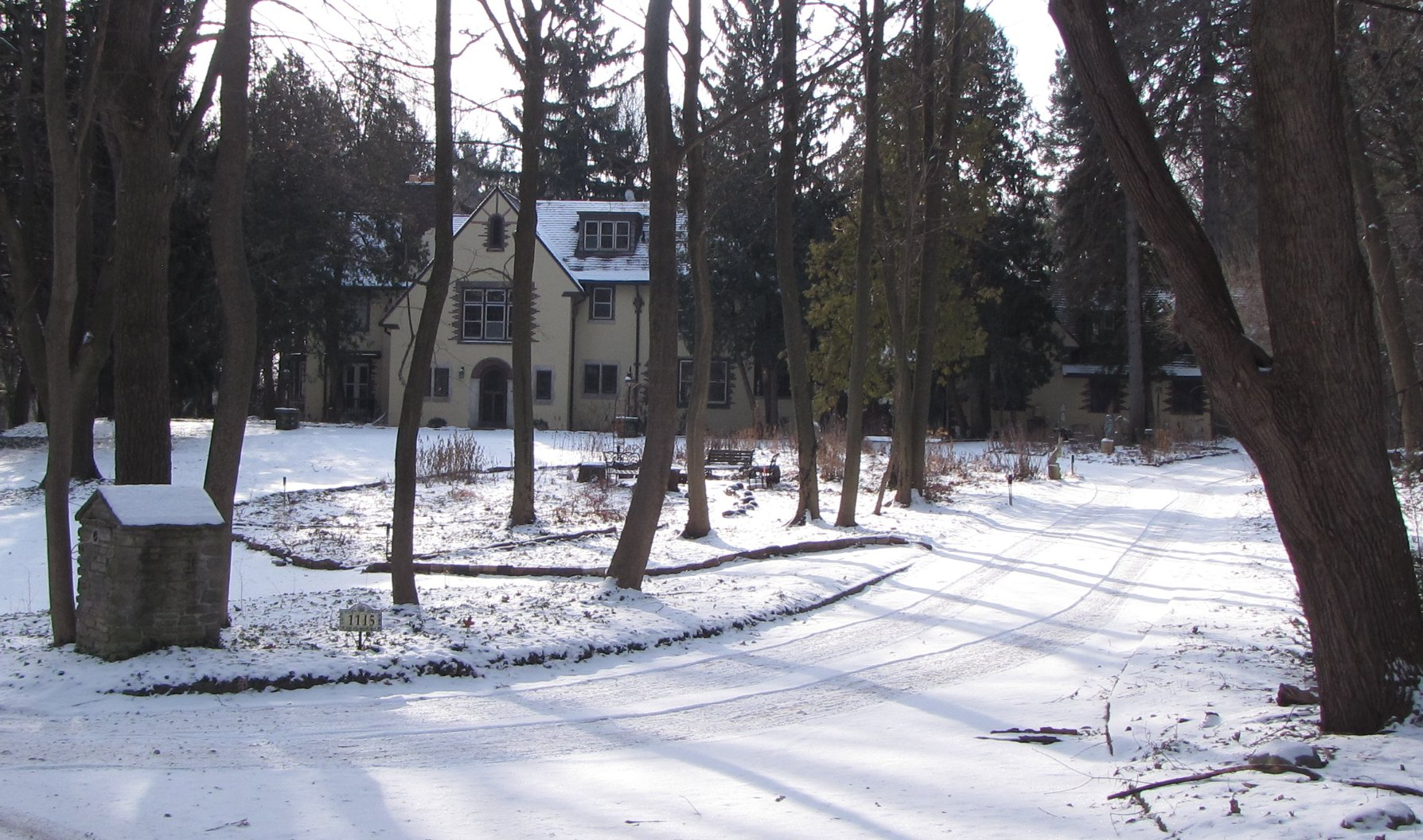
- Interactive map
- Location: 1115 Eton Cross, Bloomfield Hills, Michigan
- Coordinates: 42°34′35″N 83°13′51″W
- Area: 3.7 acres (1.5 ha)
- Built: 1925
- Architect: Mildner & Eisen; (Richard Mildner, Adolph Eisen)
- Architectural style: Tudor Revival, Arts and Crafts
- NRHP reference No.: 11000668
- Added to NRHP: September 15, 2011

The Thomas W. and Margaret Taliaferro House is a single-family home located at 1115 Eton Cross in Bloomfield Hills, Michigan. It was listed on the National Register of Historic Places in 2011.

== History ==
Thomas W. Taliaferro was born in Lynchburg, Virginia in 1863. His family moved to Chicago in the 1870s, and Taliaferro started working in the meat-packing industry as a clerk in about 1880. He was soon a bookkeeper and then cashier of the packinghouse Underwood & Co., and by 1885 he was plant superintendent. In 1886, Taliaferro married Margaret Forbes McKay, a native of Charlottetown, Prince Edward Island. The couple soon moved to Omaha, Nebraska, and by 1897 Taliaferro was the general manager of Omaha Packing. By 1908, Taliaferro has moved the Detroit to become the vice-president of the meat-packing firm of Hammond, Standish & Co. He became president of the firm in 1922.

By the 1920s, Bloomfield Hills was becoming suburbanized, with Judson Bradway developing first the Bloomfield Highlands subdivision in 1914, then the Bloomfield Estates and Bloomfield Manor subdivision, and then the Trowbridge Farms subdivision in 1917. Trowbridge Farms lots required that the house, exclusive of outbuildings or lot improvements, cost at least $10,000, and that no building could be set closer than twenty-five feet from a lot line. Thomas W. and Margaret Taliaferro had lived in Birmingham, Michigan since 1912, and in 1925 they purchased a lot and built this house, one of the first two houses built in the subdivision. The Taliaferros lived in this house until Margaret's death in 1939 and Thomas's in 1940. In 1941, the house was occupied by the Children's Fund of Michigan, in 1944 by John Singos and Marian Singos, in 1956 by Charles O. Miller, in 1968 by Herbert and Mary Jane Craw, and in 1974 by Conleyt and Nancy Bacon, who owned the house until at least 2011.

== Description ==
The Taliaferro house a two and-a-half-story T-shaped building of mixed Tudor Revival, Arts and Crafts design. It stands on a low, wooded hilltop. The house is asymmetrical, with a combination of gable and hip roofs. The exterior is clad in stucco with red brick and limestone trim and wood shingles on the dormers. A cross-gable-roof three-bay garage is sited near the house and connected by a gable-roof porte cochere. The central entrance door projects outward and is enframed with cut stone jambs and a brick arch overhead. A leaded glass panel is within the arch, and casement windows with stone surrounds flank the entrance. Above the door is a broad triple leaded glass window, and in the gable peak above is a decorative arched window.

Next to the gabled entry section is a hip-roof portion of the house's front containing a paired casement leaded glass window with cut stone jambs on the first floor, and double-hung windows on the second. A shed dormer projects from the roof above. On the other side of the entrance is another paired leaded glass casement window, along with a pair of leaded glass French doors, above which is a double-hung window.

== See also ==
- National Register of Historic Places listings in Oakland County, Michigan
