= National Register of Historic Places listings in Oakland County, Michigan =

Location of Oakland County in Michigan

The following is a list of Registered Historic Places in Oakland County, Michigan.
This National Park Service list is complete through NPS recent listings posted May 1, 2026.

	Name on the Register	Image	Date listed	Location	City or town	Description
1	Gregor S. and Elizabeth B. Affleck House	Gregor S. and Elizabeth B. Affleck House	October 3, 1985 (#85003005)	1925 N. Woodward Ave. 42°35′17″N 83°14′59″W	Bloomfield Hills	
2	Eli and Sidney Teeter Albertson House	Eli and Sidney Teeter Albertson House	December 12, 2002 (#02001505)	4480 Sheldon Rd. 42°44′02″N 83°07′35″W	Oakland Township	
3	Royal Aldrich House	Royal Aldrich House	August 19, 1994 (#94000755)	31110 W. 11 Mile Rd. 42°29′06″N 83°21′24″W	Farmington Hills	
4	Andrews-Leggett House	Andrews-Leggett House	June 12, 1987 (#87000949)	722 Farr St. 42°35′39″N 83°29′25″W	Commerce Township	
5	Apple Island Historic Archaeological Site	Apple Island Historic Archaeological Site	July 20, 2018 (#100002685)	Approx. 1/2 mi. from 4549 Commerce Rd. 42°35′21″N 83°22′21″W	Orchard Lake Village	
6	Axford-Coffin Farm	Axford-Coffin Farm	March 15, 2002 (#02000159)	384-388 W. Predmore Rd. 42°47′10″N 83°08′41″W	Oakland Township	
7	B and C Grocery Building	B and C Grocery Building	March 22, 2006 (#06000149)	417-19 S. Main St. 42°29′09″N 83°08′39″W	Royal Oak	Constructed in 1946; features a metal panel Art Modern facade.
8	Botsford Inn	Botsford Inn	September 19, 1979 (#79003173)	28000 Grand River Ave. 42°26′38″N 83°19′23″W	Farmington	
9	Botsford-Graser House	Botsford-Graser House	March 15, 2002 (#02000158)	24105 Locust Dr. 42°28′13″N 83°23′04″W	Farmington Hills	
10	Brooks Farm	Brooks Farm	March 16, 1972 (#72001594)	3521 Big Beaver Rd. 42°33′39″N 83°11′28″W	Troy	The William Brooks Farm, also known as the Washington Stanley Farm, contains an 1852 fieldstone farmhouse and associated outbuildings. Troy pioneer Washington Stanley and his descendants farmed here from 1826-1911; the William Brooks family used it as a dairy until the 1960s. It is currently the headquarters of the Kresge Foundation.
11	Elijah Bull House		June 29, 2022 (#100007893)	6115 Wing Lake Rd. 42°33′00″N 83°17′37″W	Bloomfield Township	
12	Casa del Rey Apartments	Casa del Rey Apartments	June 29, 1989 (#89000787)	111 Oneida Rd. 42°37′57″N 83°18′39″W	Pontiac	
13	Caswell House	Caswell House	January 13, 1972 (#72000650)	60 W. Wattles Rd. 42°34′40″N 83°09′03″W	Troy	An especially well-preserved example of Greek Revival architecture. The home was built by Solomon and Hulda Caswell in 1832, and Caswell's descendants occupied it until 1965, when William Caswell, Solomon's grandson, died a bachelor. In 1968, the house was moved from its original location, and it is now part of the Troy Museum and Historic Village.
14	Central School	Central School	February 16, 1984 (#84001809)	101 E. Pike St. 42°38′16″N 83°17′18″W	Pontiac	
15	Clarkston Village Historic District	Clarkston Village Historic District	May 15, 1980 (#80001884)	M-15; 42°44′11″N 83°25′08″W	Clarkston Village	Located in the southern part of Independence Township along M-15. The historic district includes Buffalo Street, Church Street, Clarkston Road, Depot Road, Holcomb Street, Main Street (M-15), Miller Road, Waldon Road and Washington Street, and includes over 100 historic structures.
16	Clinton-Kalamazoo Canal	Clinton-Kalamazoo Canal	March 24, 1972 (#72000638)	Runs between Utica and Yates; 42°39′17″N 83°03′10″W	Utica	The Clinton–Kalamazoo Canal was begun in 1838, with the plan of connecting Mount Clemens to the mouth of the Kalamazoo River. However, funding quickly dried up, and all construction stopped in 1843 after only 13 miles had been completed. The remains of the canal extend into both Oakland County and Macomb County.
17	Cranbrook	Cranbrook	March 7, 1973 (#73000954)	Lone Pine Rd. 42°34′15″N 83°14′52″W	Bloomfield Hills	The Cranbrook Educational Community was founded in the early 20th century by newspaper mogul George Gough Booth. The campus began as a farm, purchased in 1904, and now consists of Cranbrook Schools, Cranbrook Academy of Art, Cranbrook Art Museum, Cranbrook Institute of Science and Cranbrook House and Gardens. Much of the campus was designed by Albert Kahn and Eliel Saarinen, and sculptors Carl Milles and Marshall Fredericks also spent many years in residence at Cranbrook.
18	Derby Street-Grand Trunk Western Railroad Bridge	Derby Street-Grand Trunk Western Railroad Bridge	January 27, 2000 (#99001730)	Derby St. over Grand Trunk Western Railroad; 42°33′15″N 83°12′11″W	Birmingham	
19	Detroit Finnish Co-operative Summer Camp	Detroit Finnish Co-operative Summer Camp	January 25, 2007 (#06000723)	2524 Loon Lake Rd. 42°32′55″N 83°31′03″W	Wixom	The Detroit Finnish Cooperative Summer Camp is a camping facility started in 1925 by a group of Detroit-area people of Finnish descent to preserve and share the traditions of their native land.
20	Detroit Zoological Park	Detroit Zoological Park	August 24, 1990 (#90001226)	8450 W. Ten Mile Rd. 42°28′38″N 83°09′26″W	Huntington Woods/Royal Oak	The Detroit Zoo opened in 1928, and has periodically expanded since then. Currently situated on 125 acres of land, it provides a natural habitat for more than 3,300 animals representing 280 species, and hosts more than 1.1 million visitors annually.
21	Downtown Holly Commercial District	Downtown Holly Commercial District	April 25, 1986 (#86000866)	Roughly bounded by Maple St., S. Broad St., Grand Trunk Western Railroad, and First St. 42°47′32″N 83°37′38″W	Holly	
22	Eagle Theater	Eagle Theater	February 16, 1984 (#84001810)	11-15 S. Saginaw St. 42°38′14″N 83°17′32″W	Pontiac	
23	Eastern Michigan Asylum Historic District	Eastern Michigan Asylum Historic District	March 20, 1981 (#81000315)	140 Elizabeth Lake Rd. 42°38′47″N 83°19′05″W	Pontiac	The Eastern Michigan Asylum (later the Pontiac State Hospital, then the Clinton Valley Center) was a psychiatric hospital built according to the Kirkbride Plan. Designed by Michigan State Capitol architect Elijah E. Myers, the facility opened in 1878. Despite treating 3100 patients at its peak, usage declined and the facility was closed in 1997 and demolished in 2000. The boundaries of the historic district were decrease in 1986.
24	John & Mary Elizabeth Booth Endicott House	John & Mary Elizabeth Booth Endicott House	March 25, 2008 (#08000223)	290 Chesterfield; 42°33′47″N 83°13′53″W	Bloomfield Hills	
25	Caleb Everts House	Caleb Everts House	October 14, 1980 (#80001886)	8880 Hickory Ridge Rd. 42°43′33″N 83°39′49″W	Davisburg	
26	Fairgrove Avenue Historic District	Fairgrove Avenue Historic District	January 31, 1985 (#85000166)	Along Fairgrove Ave. between N. Saginaw and Edison Sts. 42°38′39″N 83°17′34″W	Pontiac	
27	Farmington Historic District	Farmington Historic District	June 18, 1976 (#76001034)	Grand River Ave. and Shiawassee Ave. from Warner St. to junction 42°27′56″N 83°22′41″W	Farmington	
28	First Methodist Episcopal Church of Farmington	First Methodist Episcopal Church of Farmington	August 25, 2014 (#14000512)	33112 Grand River Ave. 42°27′51″N 83°22′25″W	Farmington	
29	Dr. Henry K. Foote House	Dr. Henry K. Foote House	January 11, 1985 (#85000062)	213 W. Huron St. 42°35′06″N 83°36′07″W	Milford	
30	Franklin Boulevard Historic District	Franklin Boulevard Historic District	August 11, 1983 (#83000888)	Roughly bounded by Grand Trunk Western Railroad, Orchard Lake Ave., Miller and W. Huron Sts. 42°38′06″N 83°18′07″W	Pontiac	
31	Franklin Historic District	Franklin Historic District	February 10, 1969 (#69000070)	Roughly bounded by Fourteen Mile Rd., the Franklin River, Romany Wy., and Franklin Rd. 42°31′43″N 83°18′18″W	Franklin	Boundary increase (added 2005-07-27): Franklin Rd. and adjoining Sts.
32	Jacob and Rebecca Fuerst Farmstead	Jacob and Rebecca Fuerst Farmstead	August 21, 1997 (#97000928)	24000 Taft Rd. 42°27′54″N 83°29′36″W	Novi	The farmstead was demolished in 2008.
33	Gillespie Street-Clinton River Bridge	Gillespie Street-Clinton River Bridge	January 27, 2000 (#99001729)	Gillespie St. over Clinton River; 42°37′34″N 83°17′52″W	Pontiac	
34	John Grace School	John Grace School	April 6, 2023 (#100008828)	21030 Indian St. 42°26′44″N 83°18′42″W	Southfield	
35	Grand Trunk Western Railroad Birmingham Depot	Grand Trunk Western Railroad Birmingham Depot	September 12, 1985 (#85002148)	245 S. Eton St. 42°32′48″N 83°11′42″W	Birmingham	
36	Griggs Brothers-Rochester Elevator Company Grain Elevator	Griggs Brothers-Rochester Elevator Company Grain Elevator	December 13, 2010 (#10001028)	303 East University Drive; 42°40′55″N 83°07′54″W	Rochester	1880 wooden grain elevator on the Michigan Central Railroad critical to the agrarian economy of the region through the mid-20th century.
37	Grinnell Brothers Music House	Grinnell Brothers Music House	April 19, 1984 (#84001812)	27 S. Saginaw St. 42°38′10″N 83°17′31″W	Pontiac	
38	Highland United Methodist Church	Highland United Methodist Church	July 9, 1981 (#81000314)	205 W. Livingston Rd. 42°38′15″N 83°37′10″W	Highland	Historic Gothic Revival church building; constructed in 1886. The Hickory Ridge School, built in 1835, was moved to the site in 1946 and serves as the rear addition. In 1980, the building was purchased by Highland Township, and the structure currently known houses the Huron Valley Council for the Arts.
39	Hilzinger Block	Hilzinger Block	May 17, 2006 (#06000403)	106-110 S. Main St. 42°29′23″N 83°08′41″W	Royal Oak	Completed in 1925 for the Hilzinger Hardware Store. The store occupied the building until 2002, after which the facade was renovated to match the original appearance.
40	Hirst Hotel	Hirst Hotel	February 8, 1980 (#80001887)	110 Battle Alley; 42°47′27″N 83°37′36″W	Holly	
41	Holly Union Depot	Holly Union Depot	December 21, 2000 (#00000645)	223 S. Broad St. 42°47′21″N 83°37′27″W	Holly	
42	Horatio N. Howard House	Horatio N. Howard House	December 27, 1984 (#84000545)	403 N. Saginaw; 42°38′50″N 83°17′41″W	Pontiac	
43	Hubbard-Kesby House	Hubbard-Kesby House	June 3, 1996 (#96000612)	1965 W. Dawson Rd. 42°33′49″N 83°38′08″W	Milford	
44	John W. Hunter House	John W. Hunter House	January 13, 1972 (#72000648)	556 W. Maple Rd. 42°32′48″N 83°13′10″W	Birmingham	
45	Indian Lake Road Stone Arch Bridge	Indian Lake Road Stone Arch Bridge	July 22, 2005 (#05000712)	Indian Lake Rd., east of M-24; 42°47′51″N 83°14′47″W	Orion Township	Currently used as part of a walk/bike path over Indian Lake Road.
46	Lake Orion Historic District	Lake Orion Historic District	August 23, 2006 (#06000722)	Roughly bounded by Elizabeth St., Hauxwell Dr., Front St., and Lapeer St. 42°47′10″N 83°14′19″W	Lake Orion	
47	Lathrup Village Historic District	Lathrup Village Historic District	March 16, 1998 (#98000150)	Roughly bounded by city limits, Red River Dr., Interstate 696, Middlesex Ave., Meadowbrook Way, and Margate Ave. 42°29′35″N 83°13′35″W	Lathrup Village	
48	Lower Trout Lake Bathhouse Complex and Contact Station	Lower Trout Lake Bathhouse Complex and Contact Station	September 3, 2013 (#13000670)	Bald Mountain Recreation Area Entrance Drive (Orion Township, Michigan); 42°44′19″N 83°13′25″W	Auburn Hills vicinity	
49	Kittie C. McCoy House	Kittie C. McCoy House	March 25, 2009 (#08001105)	1455 Benstein Road; 42°32′40″N 83°30′12″W	Commerce Township	
50	Meadow Brook Farms	Meadow Brook Farms	April 17, 1979 (#79001166)	480 S. Adams Rd. 42°40′23″N 83°11′55″W	Rochester vicinity	Also known as Meadow Brook Farm. Tudor Revival mansion built between 1926 and 1929 by Matilda Dodge Wilson (the widow of auto pioneer John Francis Dodge) and her second husband, lumber broker Alfred G. Wilson. In 1957, the mansion and the surrounding property and buildings were donated to establish Michigan State University–Oakland, now Oakland University.
51	Milford Rural Agricultural School	Milford Rural Agricultural School	January 22, 1992 (#91001995)	630 Hickory St. 42°35′38″N 83°35′52″W	Milford	
52	Modern Housing Corporation Addition Historic District	Modern Housing Corporation Addition Historic District	June 9, 1989 (#89000490)	Roughly bounded by Montcalm St., Perry St., Joslyn Ave., Gage St., Glenwood, and Nelson St. 42°39′13″N 83°16′44″W	Pontiac	
53	Myrick-Palmer House	Myrick-Palmer House	July 8, 1970 (#70000283)	223 W. Huron St. 42°38′12″N 83°18′04″W	Pontiac	
54	Milo Prentice Newberry House		October 9, 2018 (#100002997)	705 Bloomer Rd. 42°40′37″N 83°07′09″W	Rochester	
55	North Milford Village Historic District	North Milford Village Historic District	April 21, 2000 (#00000391)	Historic area of North Milford Village; 42°35′26″N 83°35′51″W	Milford	
56	Northland Gardens		January 24, 2020 (#100004660)	Westland Ave., Westhampton Rd., Rutland Dr., and Westover Rd. between Southfield Rd., & the John C. Lodge Freeway; 42°26′50″N 83°12′52″W	Southfield	
57	H. Augustus and Agnes Cleveland O'Dell House-Inch House		March 17, 2009 (#09000129)	1945 Tiverton Road; 42°35′16″N 83°14′40″W	Bloomfield Hills	
58	Oak Hill Cemetery	Oak Hill Cemetery	June 20, 1989 (#89000493)	216 University Dr. 42°38′34″N 83°17′07″W	Pontiac	
59	Orchard Lake Schools Historic District	Orchard Lake Schools Historic District	March 19, 1982 (#82002859)	Indian Trail; 42°35′38″N 83°21′28″W	Orchard Lake	Encompasses the area occupied in 1877 for the Michigan Military Academy, an all-boys military prep school established by Captain J. Sumner Rogers. The school closed in 1908 due to bankruptcy, and in 1910 the Polish Seminary of Detroit purchased the campus moved the school (now SS. Cyril and Methodius Seminary) there. The campus is also home to St. Mary's Preparatory, and is used by nearby Madonna University.
60	Ortonville Mill	Ortonville Mill	April 16, 1971 (#71000416)	366 Mill St. 42°51′07″N 83°26′45″W	Ortonville	
61	Oxford Downtown Historic District	Oxford Downtown Historic District	July 15, 2019 (#100004158)	Washington St./MI-24 and Burdick St. 42°49′29″N 83°15′54″W	Oxford	
62	Pleasant Ridge East Historic District	Pleasant Ridge East Historic District	February 1, 2007 (#06001329)	Bounded generally by Woodward, 10 Mile Rd., Conrail, and eastern and southern city limits 42°28′14″N 83°08′13″W	Pleasant Ridge	
63	Pleasant Ridge Historic District	Pleasant Ridge Historic District	August 11, 1992 (#92000165)	Roughly bounded by Millington Rd., Woodward Ave., Ferndale and Ridge Rd. Boundary increase (listed December 13, 2010): West of Ridge Rd. to city limits of Royal Oak, Huntington Woods, Oak Park, and Ferndale. 42°28′14″N 83°08′43″W	Pleasant Ridge	
64	Plumbrooke Estates		November 22, 2019 (#100004661)	Plumbrooke Dr. 42°27′41″N 83°14′54″W	Southfield	
65	Pontiac Commercial Historic District	Pontiac Commercial Historic District	February 16, 1984 (#84001817)	1-29 N. Saginaw St., 5-29 W. Lawrence St., and 10-18 W. Pike St. 42°38′13″N 83°17′35″W	Pontiac	Boundary increase (added 1989-06-23): Roughly E. Huron St. and S. Saginaw St. within loop of Wide Track Dr.
66	Walter P. and May Wolf Reuther House		June 20, 2002 (#02000668)	3924-3950-3954 Ellamae (Oakland Township); 42°44′28″N 83°10′19″W	Rochester	
67	Rowe House	Rowe House	December 6, 1975 (#75000959)	2360 Lone Tree Rd., northwest of Milford; 42°37′21″N 83°38′53″W	Milford	
68	Sashabaw Presbyterian Church	Sashabaw Presbyterian Church	October 9, 1980 (#80001885)	Northeast of Clarkston at 5331 Maybee Rd. 42°43′09″N 83°21′44″W	Clarkston	Built in 1856 for the First Presbyterian of Independence Township. The congregation dissolved in 1932, and in 1946, the Sashabaw United Presbyterian Church was organized and began using this building as its home.
69	William Edmund and Nina A. Downey Scripps Estate	William Edmund and Nina A. Downey Scripps Estate	September 27, 2007 (#07001009)	1840 Scripps Rd. 42°44′58″N 83°17′01″W	Lake Orion	Also called the Scripps Mansion or Moulton Manor. Tudor Revival mansion built by William Edmund Scripps for his family in 1927; now serves as a Catholic Guest House and Retreat Center.
70	Melvyn Maxwell and Sara Stein Smith House	Melvyn Maxwell and Sara Stein Smith House	March 28, 1997 (#97000283)	5045 Ponvalley Rd., Bloomfield Township; 42°33′54″N 83°16′16″W	Pontiac	Also known as Myhaven. Frank Lloyd Wright-designed Usonian home that was constructed in 1949 and 1950. The owners were two public school teachers living on a tight budget. The 1957 landscape design is by Thomas Dolliver Church.
71	Rollin Sprague Building-Old Stone Store	Rollin Sprague Building-Old Stone Store	April 22, 1999 (#99000474)	300 Main St. 42°40′46″N 83°08′00″W	Rochester	
72	St. Vincent DePaul Catholic Church, Convent, and School	St. Vincent DePaul Catholic Church, Convent, and School	June 9, 1989 (#89000492)	150 E. Wide Track Dr. 42°37′56″N 83°17′14″W	Pontiac	The St. Vincent de Paul Church was built in 1885. In 1999, the diocese merged the St. Vincent de Paul parish with two other local parishes (St. Joseph and St. Michael the Archangel) to form the St Damien of Molokai parish.
73	Stony Creek Village Historic District	Stony Creek Village Historic District	June 26, 1972 (#72000649)	Northeast of Rochester on Washington Rd. 42°41′48″N 83°06′49″W	Rochester	
74	Thomas W. and Margaret Taliaferro House	Thomas W. and Margaret Taliaferro House	September 15, 2011 (#11000668)	1115 Eton Cross; 42°34′35″N 83°13′51″W	Bloomfield Hills	
75	Charles Torrey House	Charles Torrey House	May 21, 1992 (#92000585)	1141 Foxwood Ct. 42°36′58″N 83°13′23″W	Bloomfield Township	
76	Walbri Hall	Walbri Hall	January 6, 2022 (#100007209)	3570 Walbri Dr. 42°35′20″N 83°13′24″W	Bloomfield Hills	
77	Waterford Village Historic District	Waterford Village Historic District	August 10, 1979 (#79001167)	Dubay Street, Pontiff Street, Steffens Street, Andersonville Road and Airport Road. 42°42′00″N 83°24′20″W	Waterford Township	
78	Elmer R. Webster School	Elmer R. Webster School	May 9, 2022 (#100007710)	640 West Huron St. 42°38′10″N 83°18′58″W	Pontiac	
79	Western Knitting Mills	Western Knitting Mills	June 9, 2000 (#00000646)	400 Water St. 42°40′49″N 83°07′52″W	Rochester	
80	Wisner House	Wisner House	July 8, 1970 (#70000284)	405 Cesar Chavez Ave. 42°38′54″N 83°18′17″W	Pontiac	
81	Minoru and Teruko (Hirashiki) Yamasaki House	Minoru and Teruko (Hirashiki) Yamasaki House	December 11, 2013 (#13000905)	3717 Lakecrest Drive; 42°35′14″N 83°13′33″W	Bloomfield Hills	The home of architect Minoru Yamasaki, designed by him in 1972.
82	Joseph D. Yerkes House	Joseph D. Yerkes House	January 26, 1984 (#84001822)	42580 Eight Mile Rd. 42°26′18″N 83°27′53″W	Novi	The original Joseph Yerkes House burned in 1989.
83	Robert Yerkes House	Robert Yerkes House	November 30, 1973 (#73000955)	535 E. Base Line Rd. 42°26′17″N 83°28′35″W	Northville	

== Former listings ==
	Name on the Register	Image	Date listed	Date removed	Location	City or town	Description
1	Trowbridge Road-Grand Trunk Western Railroad Bridge	Trowbridge Road-Grand Trunk Western Railroad Bridge	January 28, 2000 (#80001858)	July 10, 2023	Trowbridge Rd. over Grand Trunk Western Railroad; 42°34′50″N 83°13′51″W	Bloomfield Hills	Demolished as of 2020.

== See also ==
- List of Michigan State Historic Sites in Oakland County, Michigan
- List of National Historic Landmarks in Michigan
- National Register of Historic Places listings in Michigan
- Listings in neighboring counties: Genesee, Lapeer, Livingston, Macomb, Washtenaw, Wayne
