= Eli and Sidney Teeter Albertson House =

- U.S. National Register of Historic Places
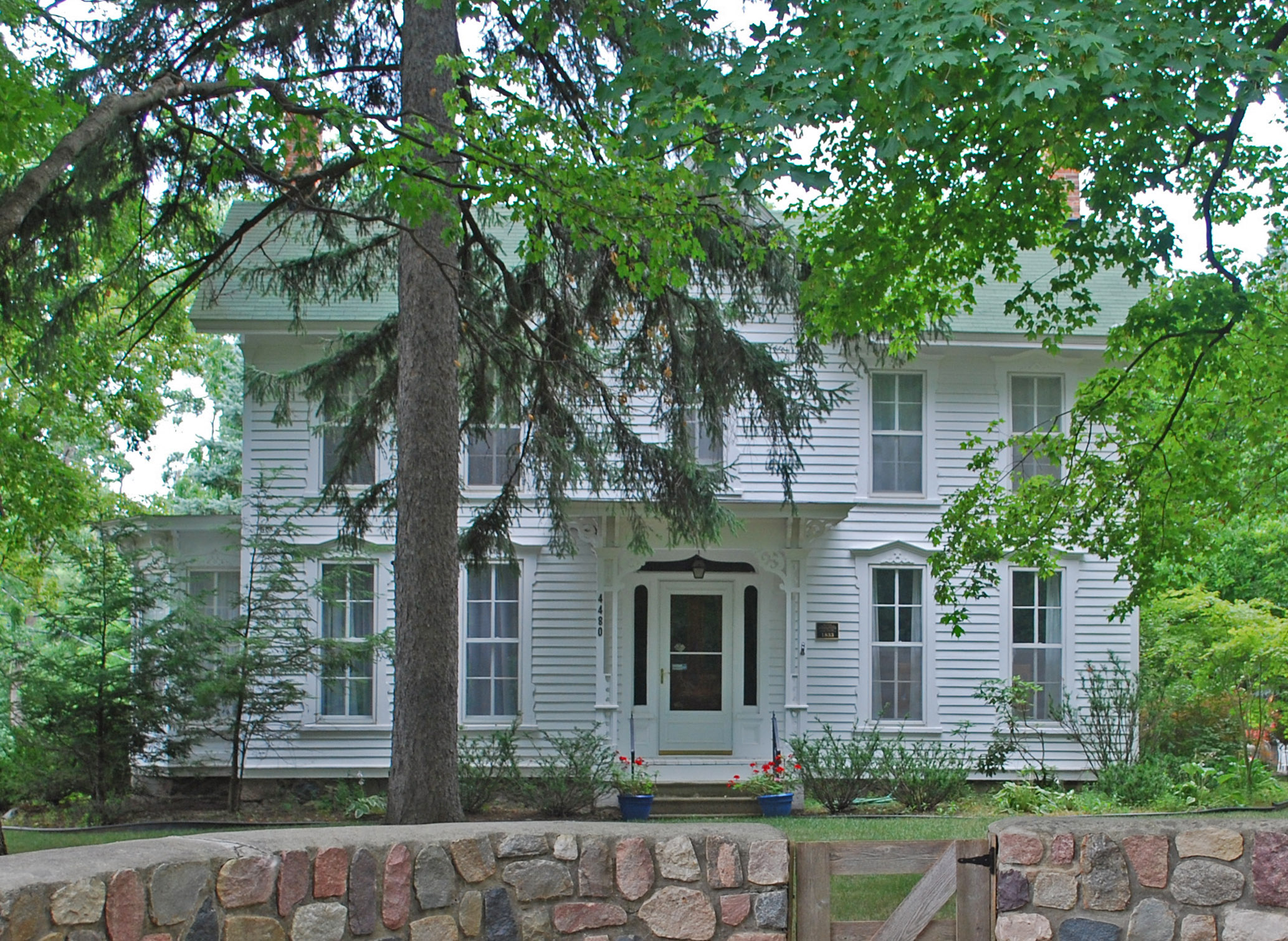
- Interactive map
- Location: 4480 Sheldon Rd., Oakland Township, Michigan
- Coordinates: 42°44′02″N 83°07′35″W
- Area: 4.9 acres (2.0 ha)
- Built: 1856
- Architectural style: Mid 19th Century Revival
- NRHP reference No.: 02001505
- Added to NRHP: December 12, 2002

The Eli and Sidney Teeter Albertson House is a single family home located at 4480 Sheldon Road in Oakland Charter Township, Michigan. It is a rare Victorian example of an I-house in Oakland Township. It was listed on the National Register of Historic Places in 2002.

== History ==
In 1833, Martin Coleman purchased this parcel of land, likely building a small house and barn on the property soon afterward. In 1845, Coleman transferred 80 acres, including the house and barn, to Zenas Coleman, probably his son. In 1856, Zenas Coleman sold their 80 acres to Eli Albertson and his wife, Sidney Teeter Albertson. The Albertsons made extensive improvements to the property, including constructing a substantial main house as an addition to the already extant smaller house.

Eli Albertson died in 1882, and the farm eventually passed to his youngest daughter Carrie May and her husband Harvey Crissman. The Crissmans planted apple orchards on the property. In 1949, most of the 80 acre farm was platted into a subdivision, and the ownership of the house passed out of the family.

== Description ==
The Albertson House is a two-story rectangular, side-gabled building five bays wide, on a fieldstone foundation. The house is likely timber-framed rather than balloon-framed. It has clapboard siding, decorative wood trim, and an asphalt-shingled roof. A string of connected additions runs to one side, and a bay window projects from one wall. The main facade is symmetrical, with a central front gable, a large window in the second story below, and a one-story entry porch on the first floor. The central entry axis is flanked on both floors with double-hung, two-over-two windows of equal size.

Decorative wood trim accents the house, including stickwork support posts on the entry porch, with panels between the sticks displaying hearts, circles, and teardrops. Pedimented hoods with decorative trim are above the windows, and paired brackets run along the cornice line.

== See also ==
- National Register of Historic Places listings in Oakland County, Michigan
