= Hilzinger Block =

- U.S. National Register of Historic Places
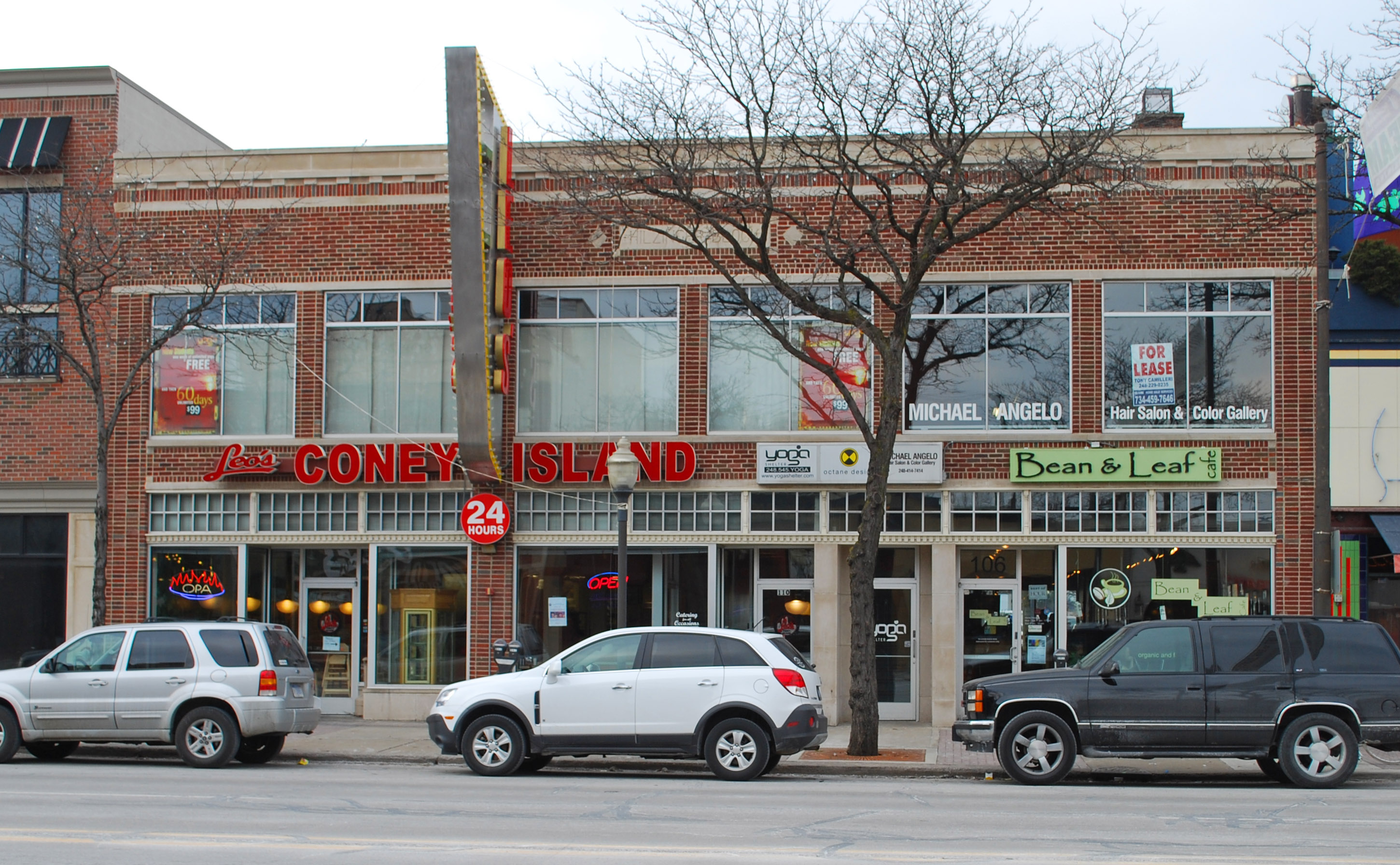

- Location within Michigan Location within the United States
- Interactive map
- Location: 106-110 S. Main St., Royal Oak, Michigan
- Coordinates: 42°29′23″N 83°8′41″W
- Area: less than one acre
- Built: 1925
- Built by: Mouw & Van Essen
- Architectural style: Commercial Brick
- NRHP reference No.: 06000403
- Added to NRHP: May 17, 2006

The Hilzinger Block is a commercial building located at 106-110 South Main Street in Royal Oak, Michigan. It was listed on the National Register of Historic Places in 2006.

== History ==
In 1859, Philip Storz built his home and an associated shoe shop at the corner of Main and Eleven Mile in Royal Oak. Phillip's daughter Mary married William Hilzinger in 1883; Hilzinger opened a string of commercial businesses located in buildings on the Storz property south of Eleven Mile, including a wholesale milk and butter business, a mineral spring water business, and an electric light plant. By the 1920s, Detroit's booming economy had accelerated development up the Woodward corridor all the way to Royal Oak, spurring commercial redevelopment in the area.

One of the buildings constructed in the redevelopment boom was the Hilzinger Block, constructed in 1925. One of its first tenants was the Hilzinger Hardware Store, owned by William Hilzinger's sons Albert and Carl Hilzinger. The building also housed a sandwich shop and a ball room on the upper floor.

The Hilzinger Hardware Store originally occupied the center storefront of the block, but in 1955 expanded in tho the north storefront, and in 1963 onto the south storefront. Albert Hilzinger's sons, Raymond and Franklin, took over the business in the 1950s, and ran it as the Hilzinger Brothers Hardware Store until 2001, after which the building was vacant for a time. The building was renovated numerous times, including a 1963 renovation that covered the external facade with sheet metal. The building was purchased in 2003 by 2mission, who rehabilitated the building and restored the original brick facade, and brought in five tenants to the building.

== Description ==
The Hilzinger Block is a 12000 square feet, two story red brick building with three storefronts. The current facade is similar to the original, and includes an unusual multi-light transom over the first-floor storefronts that was re-created from old photographs. The facade is simply detailed, with broad piers at each end and narrower piers between the southern and central storefront on the first story and between the windows on the second. A recessed entryway leading to the upper floor separates the northern and central storefront. A frieze and slightly projecting limestone cornice tops the building. At the center of the frieze is a limestone plaque bearing the buildings name, HILZINGER BLOCK. A large vertical illuminated metal sign projects outward from the building at the second floor level. The sign was originally installed in 1963 for Hilzinger Hardware, and was restored and updated with the name of the current occupant.

== See also ==
- National Register of Historic Places listings in Oakland County, Michigan
