= Casa del Rey Apartments =

- U.S. National Register of Historic Places
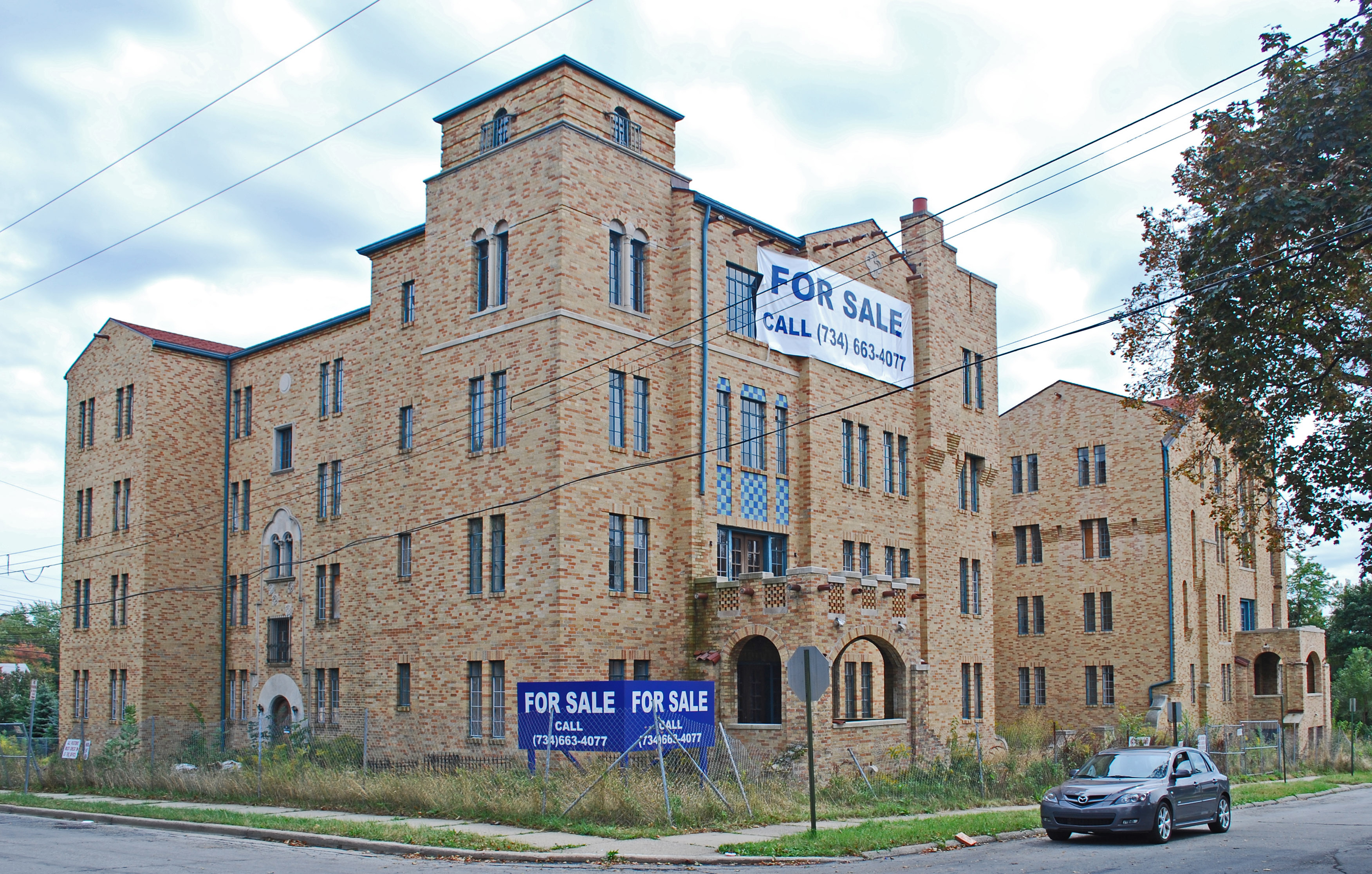

- Location within Michigan Location within the United States
- Interactive map
- Location: 111 Oneida Rd., Pontiac, Michigan
- Coordinates: 42°37′57″N 83°18′39″W
- Area: less than one acre
- Built: 1928
- Built by: Pryale Construction Company, Inc.
- Architect: Robert O. Derrick, William C. Zimmerman
- Architectural style: Late 19th And 20th Century Revivals, Spanish eclectic
- NRHP reference No.: 89000787
- Added to NRHP: June 29, 1989

The Casa del Rey Apartments is an apartment building located at 111 Oneida Road in Pontiac, Michigan. It was listed on the National Register of Historic Places in 1989.

== History ==
In the late 1920s, Pontiac was a boomtown, and housing was scarce as workers moved to the city to find jobs in the local automobile factories. Taking advantage of the market, local real estate investor C.L. Groesbeck Jr. began work on the Casa del Rey Apartments in 1928. Groesbeck hired Robert O. Derrick, an architect with offices in both Detroit and Pontiac, to design the building. Derrick's Pontiac office manager, William C. Zimmerman, oversaw the development of plans for the apartment. Pryale Construction Company, Inc. of Pontiac was hired to construct the building. Construction began in 1928 and was complete in early 1929. When completed, the building had 41 individual apartments ranging in size from two to six rooms, and was supposedly the largest apartment building in Pontiac at the time.

In 2014, the apartment had been vacant for years, and was for sale.

In November 2024, construction began on the redevelopment of the Casa del Rey Apartments into affordable housing units. The $15.5 million redevelopment was led by two Pontiac natives, Gregory and Ronita Coleman as well as the Oakland County Land Bank Authority. The redevelopment was completed in 2026, with the building housing 54 affordable housing units. A ribbon cutting ceremony re-opening the building was held on September 29th, 2026.

== Description ==
The Casa del Rey Apartments building is a 4 1/2-story Spanish eclectic structure of yellow and orange brick. It is a C-shaped building, with the main entry within a courtyard facing the street. Two entry porches face the street on either side of the courtyard opening. On the third level above the porches are three panels filled with sky blue and pale green ceramic tiles; similar panels are above the entryway. The main entry itself consists of a heavy round-topped opening surrounded with cut stone detailing. Windows in the structure are vertical, metal casement units.

Inside, the public spaces are elaborately detailed with clay tiles in a variety of patterns and colors. The main entry opens into a vestibule, which leads to the lobby. The lobby is elliptical, with a fountain. Winding stairs lead to the corridors, which are a few feet above the lobby floor.

== See also ==
- National Register of Historic Places listings in Oakland County, Michigan

== External link ==
- Official website
