= Fairgrove Avenue Historic District =

- U.S. National Register of Historic Places
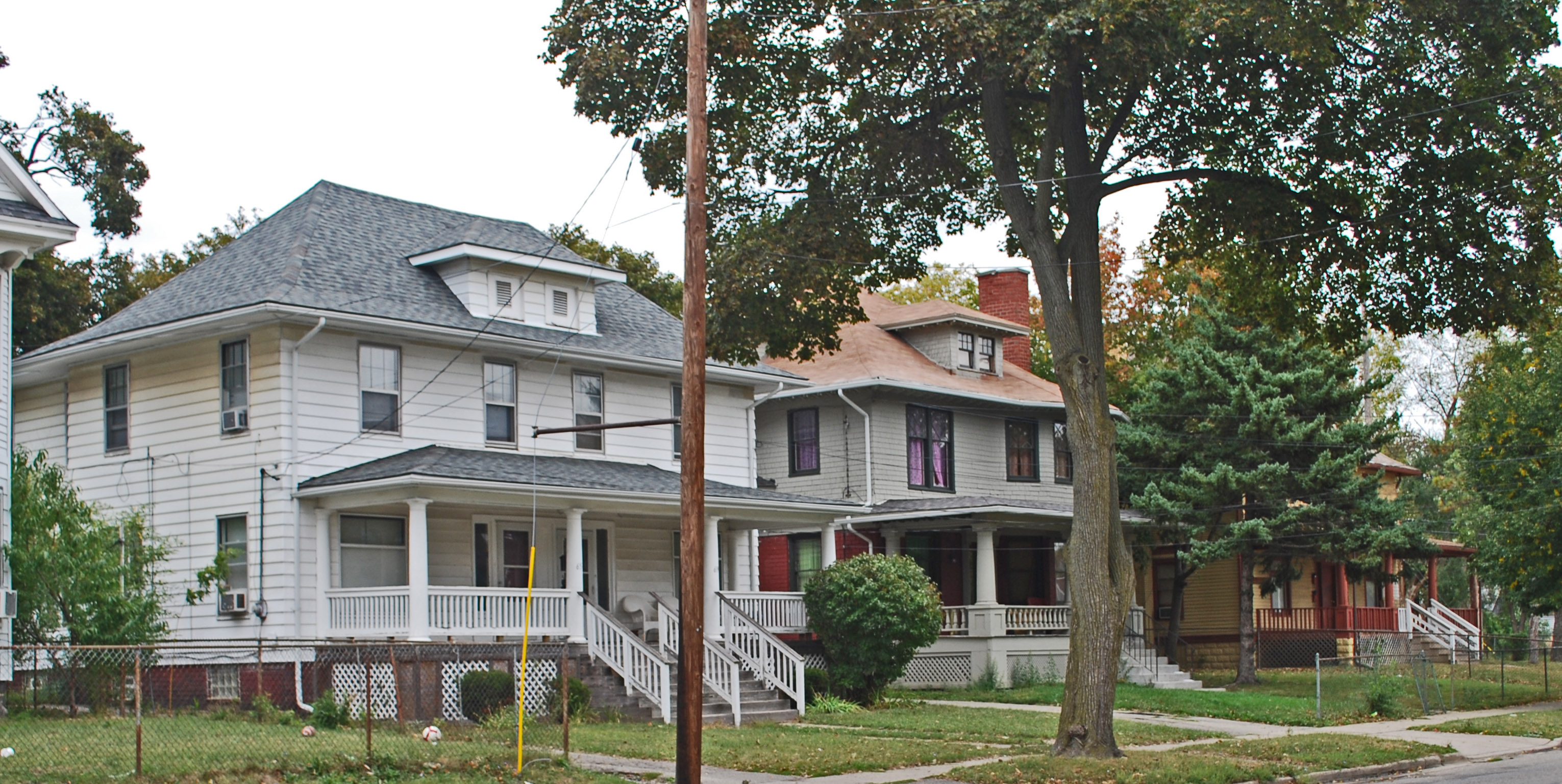
- North side of Fairgrove at Lexington

- Location within Michigan Location within the United States
- Interactive map
- Location: Along Fairgrove Ave. between N. Saginaw and Edison Sts., Pontiac, Michigan
- Coordinates: 42°38′39″N 83°17′34″W
- Area: 8 acres (3.2 ha)
- Built: 1895
- Architectural style: Colonial Revival, Queen Anne
- NRHP reference No.: 85000166
- Added to NRHP: January 31, 1985

The Fairgrove Avenue Historic District is a residential historic district located along Fairgrove Avenue, between North Saginaw and Edison Streets, in Pontiac, Michigan. It was listed on the National Register of Historic Places in 1985.

== History ==
Pontiac was founded in 1818, and residential development soon spread west and north of the downtown area. The portion of the city that is now this district was originally owned by the Oakland County Agricultural Society, and used as a fairground, with the county fair held at this location starting in 1850. The fairgrounds was used to train and muster troops during the Civil War. In 1895, The Agricultural Society purchased another section of land, and platted the older fairgrounds for residential development, creating, among others, Fairgrove Avenue. By 1904, nearly three-quarters of this district along Fairgrove had been developed, and by 1920 development was complete.

The original residents of the district were solidly middle class, and included merchants, ministers, doctors, lawyers, shop foremen, clerks, and salesmen. One of the most prominent early residents was Dr. Harry C. Quillot, Mayor of Pontiac from 1901 to 1905. Other residents included Dr. Leon F. Cobb, attorney George Armstrong Cram, Judge Kleber P. Rockwell, and Reverend Eugene A. Barlett.

== Description ==
The Fairgrove Avenue Historic District is a single block long, containing 28 turn-of-the-century middle-class homes on relatively small lots. The street is lined with shade trees, and the block is completely full save for one vacant lot where a fire damaged house was demolished. The district also includes a stone marker on the corner of Fairgrove and N. Saginaw that commemorates the Civil War use of the fairground.

Most of the houses were constructed between 1895 and 1920, with the majority constructed before 1910. Architectural styles of the structures range from Colonial Revival to Queen Anne. The houses are all 2-1/2 stories, and uniform in scale and setback, and almost all have large front porches. Nearly all are single-family homes, with the exception of two duplexes in the neighborhood, and a few structures that have been converted into apartments.

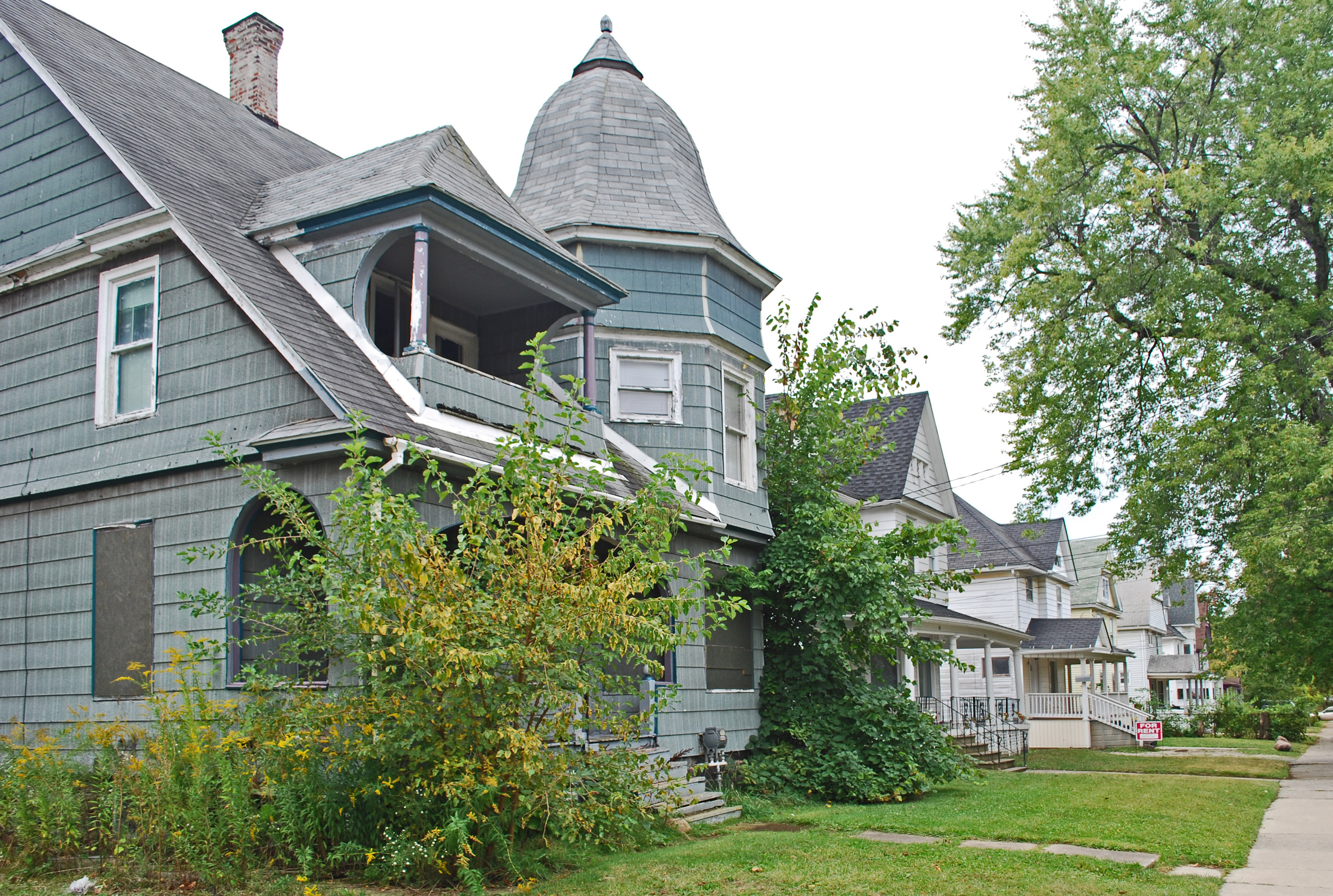
South side of Fairgrove, just west of Lexington

== See also ==
- National Register of Historic Places listings in Oakland County, Michigan
