= Milo Prentice Newberry House =

- U.S. National Register of Historic Places
- Interactive map
- Location: 705 Bloomer Rd., Rochester, Michigan
- Coordinates: 42°40′37″N 83°7′9″W
- Built: 1863
- Built by: Milo Prentice Newberry
- Architectural style: Victorian, Italianate
- NRHP reference No.: 100002997
- Added to NRHP: October 9, 2018

The Milo Prentice Newberry House is a single-family house located at 705 Bloomer Road in Rochester, Michigan. It was listed on the National Register of Historic Places in 2018. It is the last remaining Victorian-era farmhouse located within the limits of the City of Rochester.

== History ==
Milo Prentice Newberry was born in 1825, in Oneida County, New York, the son of Romeo and Sarah Beckwith Newberry. The Newberry family moved to Oakland County in 1835. Milo Newberry attended school in Rochester, and in 1849 married Mary Jane Hoyt. The couple first lived near where Romeo and Milo Newberry had constructed a sawmill, but in 1857 Milo sold the property land purchased a ten-acre parcel where this house now stands. He constructed another sawmill and began operating it. In 1859, he left for a year as part of the Pike's Peak Gold Rush. Newberry returned from the gold rush with enough money to open a cabinet shop.

Newberry also had enough money to finance the construction of a new house, which he began about 1863. In 1867, he purchased an additional 80 acres, and began transitioning away from his sawmill and into farming. The Newberrys eventually owned 149 acres of land. Milo and Mary Jane Newberry raised five children in the house. However, Mary Jane died in 1876, and Milo Newberry married his second wife, Eliza Baldwin, in 1877. Milo and Eliza had another two children.

Milo Newberry lived in this house until his death in 1909. At this time, Milo's granddaughter, Mabell Howell Frank, and her husband Lucius "Bert" Frank, purchased the property, but Newberry's wife Eliza, continued to occupy the house until her death in 1919. Bert and Mabell Frank then moved into the Milo Newberry house, and some time in the 1920s enclosed the porch and made some additions to the rear of the structure. They lived in the house and farmed the property until their deaths in 1969 and 1970. At this time, all but five acres of the farmland were sold. The Franks' granddaughter, Bette M. Frank Reddish and her husband, Michael Reddish, purchased the house in 1974, and as of 2018, Bette Frank Reddish continues to live in the Newberry house.

== Description ==
The Milo Prentice Newberry House is a mid-19th century Victorian farmhouse containing Italianate details. It is an unusual Y-shape design with 3 gable wings, a design of which there are no other known local examples. The design was likely one of Newberry's own creation. The walls are constructed of 2" solid oak and black walnut planks covered with horsehair plaster on the interior. The house is clad with cedar siding on exterior. Some of the windows still contain the original hand blown glass.

== See also ==
- National Register of Historic Places listings in Oakland County, Michigan
