= Plumbrooke Estates =

Historic district in Michigan, US

- U.S. National Register of Historic Places
- U.S. Historic district
- Interactive map
- Location: Plumbrooke Dr., Southfield, Michigan
- Coordinates: 42°27′41″N 83°14′54″W
- Built: 1961
- Built by: Maceday Construction
- Architectural style: Modern architecture, Colonial Revival
- NRHP reference No.: 100004661
- Added to NRHP: November 22, 2019

Plumbrooke Estates, also known as Plum Hollow Estates, is a residential historic district located along Plumbrooke Drive north of Nine Mile Road and west of Evergreen Road in Southfield, Michigan. It was listed on the National Register of Historic Places in 2019.

== History ==
The area of Southfield that includes the present Plumbrooke Estates was set aside for residential development in the 1920s, as the rise of the automobile made the farther suburbs more accessible from Detroit. The Plumbrooke Estates land was owned at the time by real estate investor J. Lee Baker. Although other sections of this land were developed soon after, Plumbrooke Estates remained an undeveloped investment property until after World War II, when it was sold to Muriel C. Alger. Alger had the land platted into 97 lots in 1960, after the incorporation of Southfield as a city. Development by Maceday Construction began immediately, and the first model homes opened in the neighborhood in May 1961, and by 1965 all but eight of the 97 lots had been sold. Although the neighborhood was predominantly white at first, it quickly and quietly integrated into the 1970s.

Since its inception, Plumbrooke Estates has remained a quiet neighborhood filled with high quality suburban houses. The subdivision looks substantially as it was in the 1960s, with only a few more recent additions and alterations.

== Description ==
Plumbrooke Estates is a residential neighborhood located on a rectangular parcel covering 27.5 acres. It contains ninety-five houses, most of which are constructed in Mid-Century Modern styles including Colonial Revival, Ranch, and Contemporary. The houses are located along Plumbrooke Drive, which has a series of six cul-de-sacs projecting from one side of the street so that the majority of the houses are on a cul-de-sac. The lots are rectangular or wedge-shaped, depending on their location, and houses typically sit in the center of the lot. Although the architecture of the houses varies, their uniform size and setback gives the neighborhood a cohesive look.

== See also ==
- National Register of Historic Places listings in Oakland County, Michigan
