= Rochester Grain Elevator =

- Griggs Brothers-Rochester Elevator Company Grain Elevator
- U.S. National Register of Historic Places
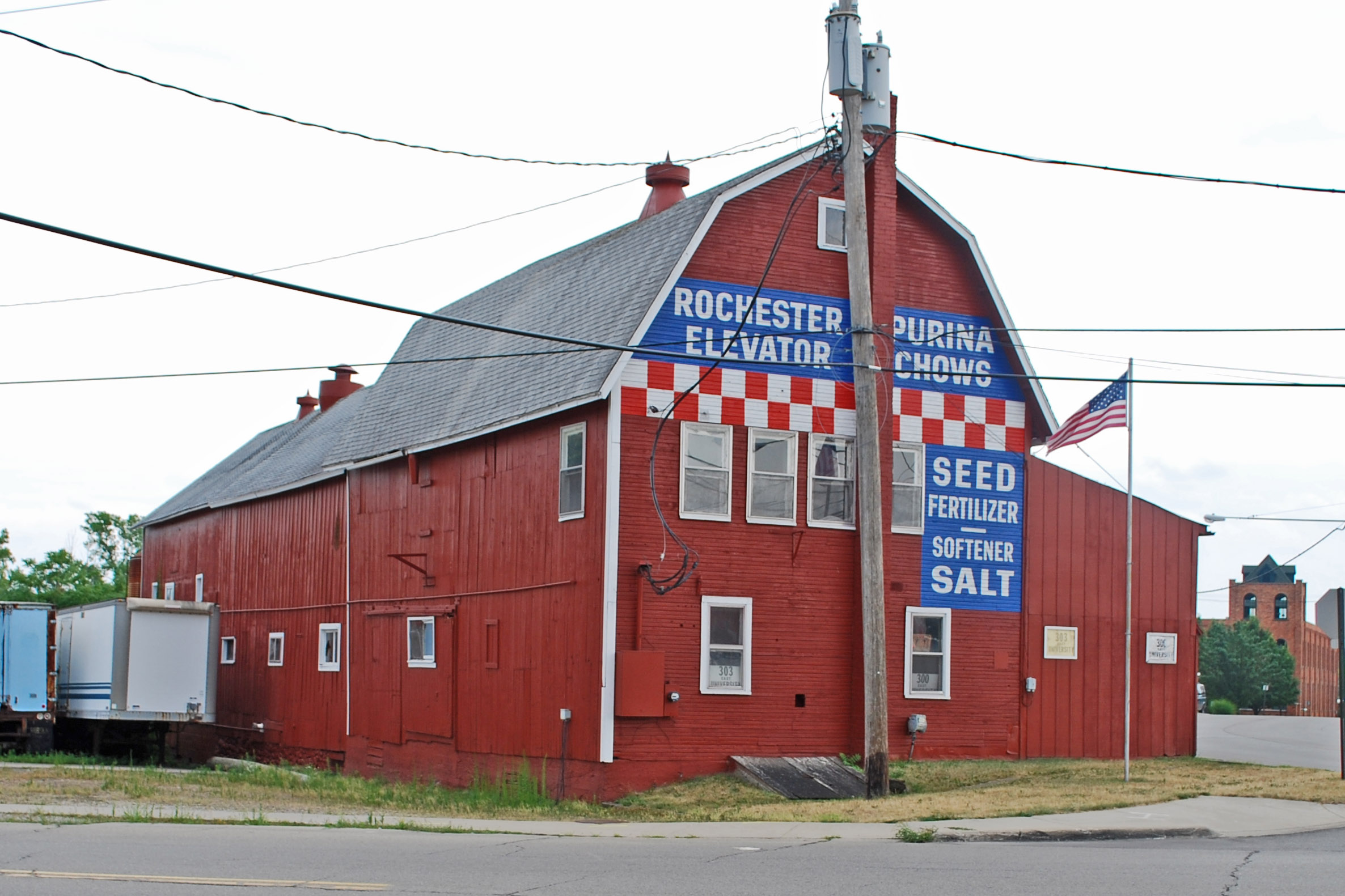
- Interactive map
- Location: 303 East University Drive, Rochester, Michigan
- Coordinates: 42°40′55″N 83°7′54″W
- Area: 1.4 acres (0.57 ha)
- Built: 1880
- Built by: John Ross
- Architect: Charles Kelly Griggs
- Architectural style: Gambrel roof elevator
- NRHP reference No.: 10001028
- Added to NRHP: December 13, 2010

The Rochester Grain Elevator, formerly the Griggs Brothers Grain Elevator, is a grain elevator located at 303 East University Drive in Rochester, Michigan. It was listed on the National Register of Historic Places in 2010. Most of the structure was demolished in 2023 to make room for construction of condominiums.

== History ==
The Detroit and Bay City Railroad first reached Rochester in 1872, and a local merchant immediately erected an elevator. In 1880, brothers Charles Kelley and Albert G. Griggs broke ground on this competing elevator. It was such a success that the brothers build a second elevator in 1884. In 1900, the Griggs sold the elevator to Erastus S. Letts, who sold it a few years later to Ferrin Brothers and Company, a large firm based in Rochester, New York. IN 1909, a group of local investors, including both Charles K. Griggs and Erastus S. Letts, formed the Rochester Elevator Company and repurchased the elevator from Ferrin Brothers. The company immediately began expanding and improving the elevator, likely by moving previously existing buildings into place and joining them to the 1880 elevator.

The Rochester Elevator changed ownership again in 1913, 1922, and 1930. In 1932, local businessman Lewis Cass Crissman purchased it, turning over operation to his son, L. Keith Crissman, who purchased it himself in 1942. It was sold again in 1952, 1956, and 1962, and Lawrence Smith eventually took over operation of the elevator. However, by the 1960s, the need for an elevator in Rochester was rapidly waning, and shipping became a minor portion of the business. Smith transitioned the company to a retail feed and seed and home and garden supply outlet, and continued operating it until its closure in 2023.

In 2023, Paul Dafoe purchased the elevator with the intent of developing a small condominium on the site. Most of the structure was demolished later that year, leaving only the gambrel-roofed northern section facing the road. Townhouse condominiums, to be known as the Granary, are being constructed on the site.

== Description ==
The Rochester Grain Elevator is a two- and three-story wood frame grain elevator, made up of three separate buildings joined to make one structure. The three portions are of roughly equal length, and are joined end-to-end. The central building is the original 1880 Griggs Brothers elevator. It is a two-story timber-frame structure on a fieldstone foundation, covered in board and batten wood siding, with a gabled roof covered in asphalt shingles. The southern section is a two-story plank frame building moved to the site in 1909. It is sheathed in rough sawn vertical wood siding and has a gabled roof covered in asphalt shingles, and sits on a concrete block foundation. The northern section is a three-story timber-frame building sheathed with wood siding on two sides and sawn vertical wood siding on the other two. It has a gambrel roof covered in asphalt shingles and sits on a poured concrete foundation. This section is likely constructed from nearby building that was salvaged in 1909 and joined to the original elevator.

The entire structure is painted barn red. The facade facing the street has two public entrances covered by a corrugated metal awning, which runs the length of the building. A small shed-roofed addition is on one end. The facade at the end facing University drive has advertising signage painted directly on the siding.

== See also ==
- National Register of Historic Places listings in Oakland County, Michigan
