= Stony Creek Village Historic District =

- U.S. National Register of Historic Places
- U.S. Historic district
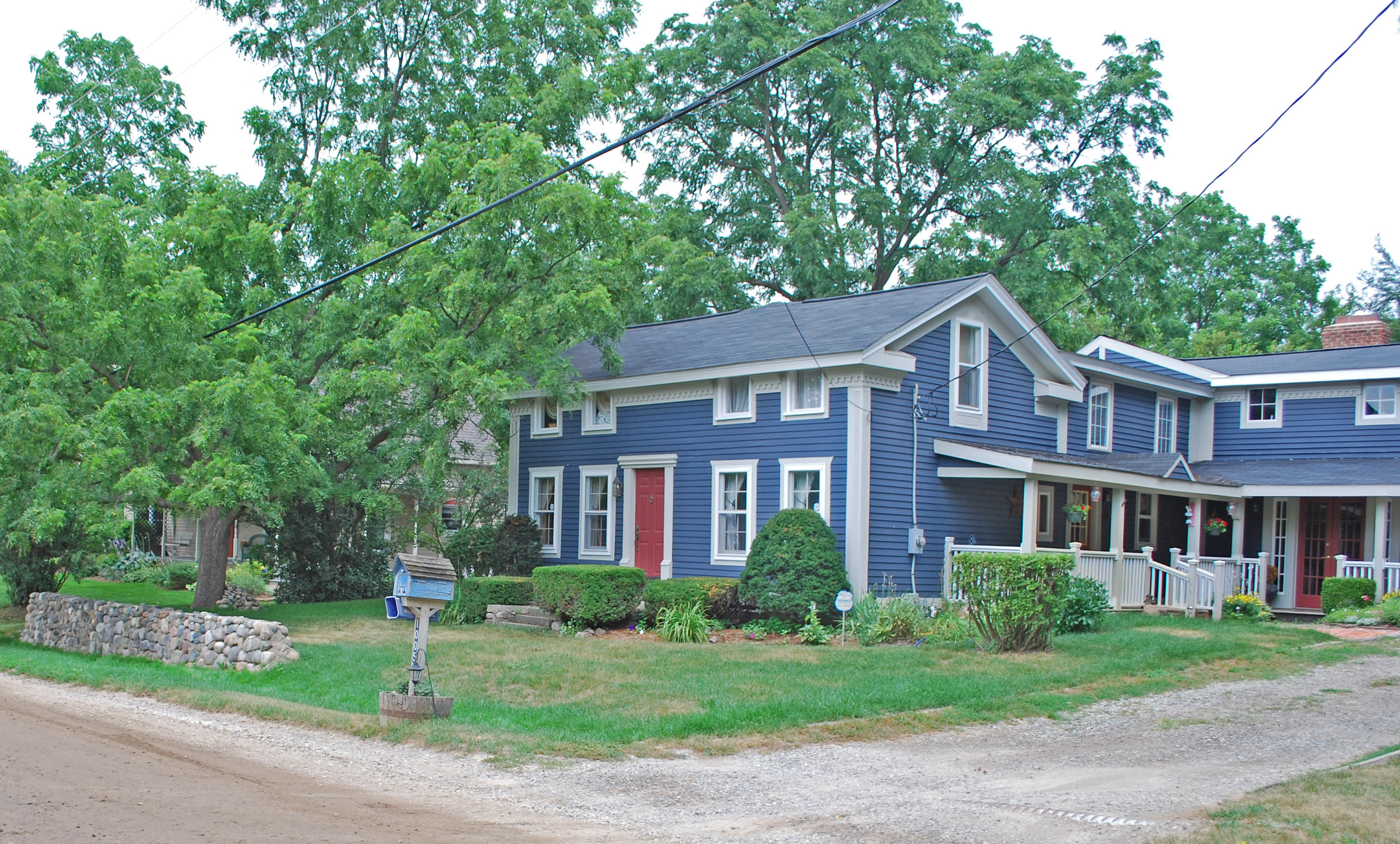

- Location within Michigan Location within the United States
- Interactive map
- Location: On Washington Rd., Rochester Hills, Michigan
- Coordinates: 42°41′48″N 83°06′49″W
- Area: 35 acres (14 ha)
- Architectural style: Greek Revival
- NRHP reference No.: 72000649
- Added to NRHP: June 26, 1972

The Stony Creek Village Historic District is a rural, agricultural historic district located on Washington Road in Rochester Hills, Michigan, USA. It was listed on the National Register of Historic Places in 1972.

== History ==
In 1823, Lemuel Taylor moved from New York state to settle on a 400-acre parcel of land at this location on Stony Creek. He built a dam and gristmill, which opened in 1824 and provided a base for a small community. By 1825, the village had a blacksmith, distillery, store, and post office. A hotel was built in the 1830s. A woolen mill was built just after the Civil War, but the industrial and commercial growth of the village was limited, in large part due to the proximity of the much larger city of Rochester.

One of the important families in Stony Creek were the Van Hoosens, who arrived in the 1830s, with then-six-year old Joshua Van Hoosen. In 1851, Joshua purchased part of the farm, then went to California to make his fortune during the gold rush. He returned in 1853, purchased the remaining interest in the farm, and married Sarah Taylor, Lemuel Taylor's daughter. By 1880, Joshua Van Hoosen owned nearly 300 acres of land in the vicinity. Joshua's granddaughter, Sarah Van Hoosen Jones, was born in 1881; Joshua died three years later and the family farm was eventually passed on to Sarah. She continued farming the area, and in 1921 received a Ph.D. in animal genetics, which led her to raise herds of prize dairy cattle. Jones donated the farm to Michigan State University upon her death in 1972. The University donated the Van Hoosen Farmhouse and three acres to Avon Township, and in 1989, the City of Rochester Hills acquired the Van Hoosen Farm buildings and 13 surrounding acres. It is now a museum operated by the city.

== Description ==
The Stony Creek Village Historic District consists of 17 houses with their associated outbuildings. Probably all of the residences are of pre-Civil War construction, and most are originally of a Greek Revival style. The houses are arranged on and around a center plat with streets on all sides. Probably the most notable among the farm buildings are the large dairy barns and silos of Sarah Van Hoosen Jones, who also owned most of the land in the village.

== Gallery ==
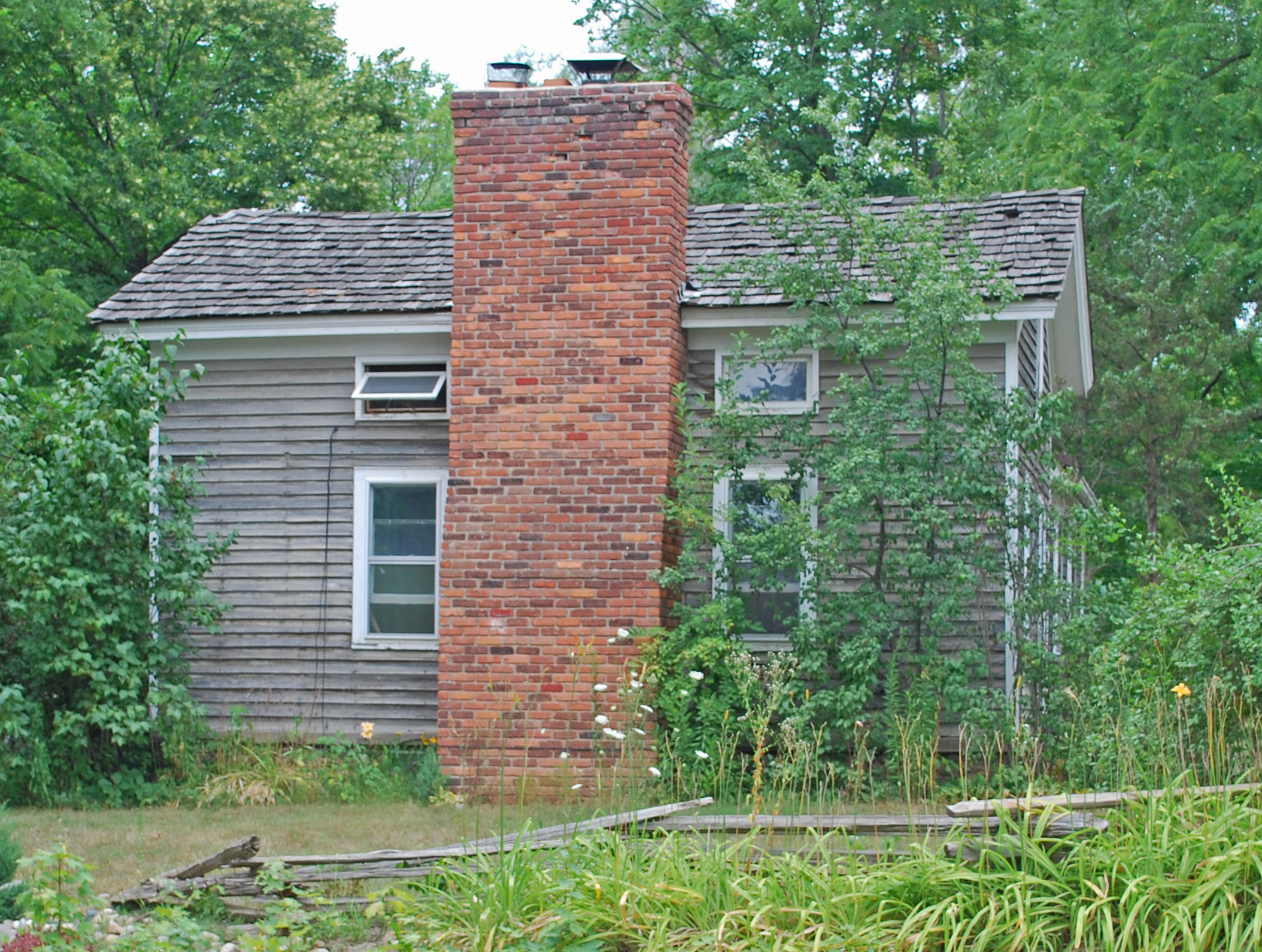
House

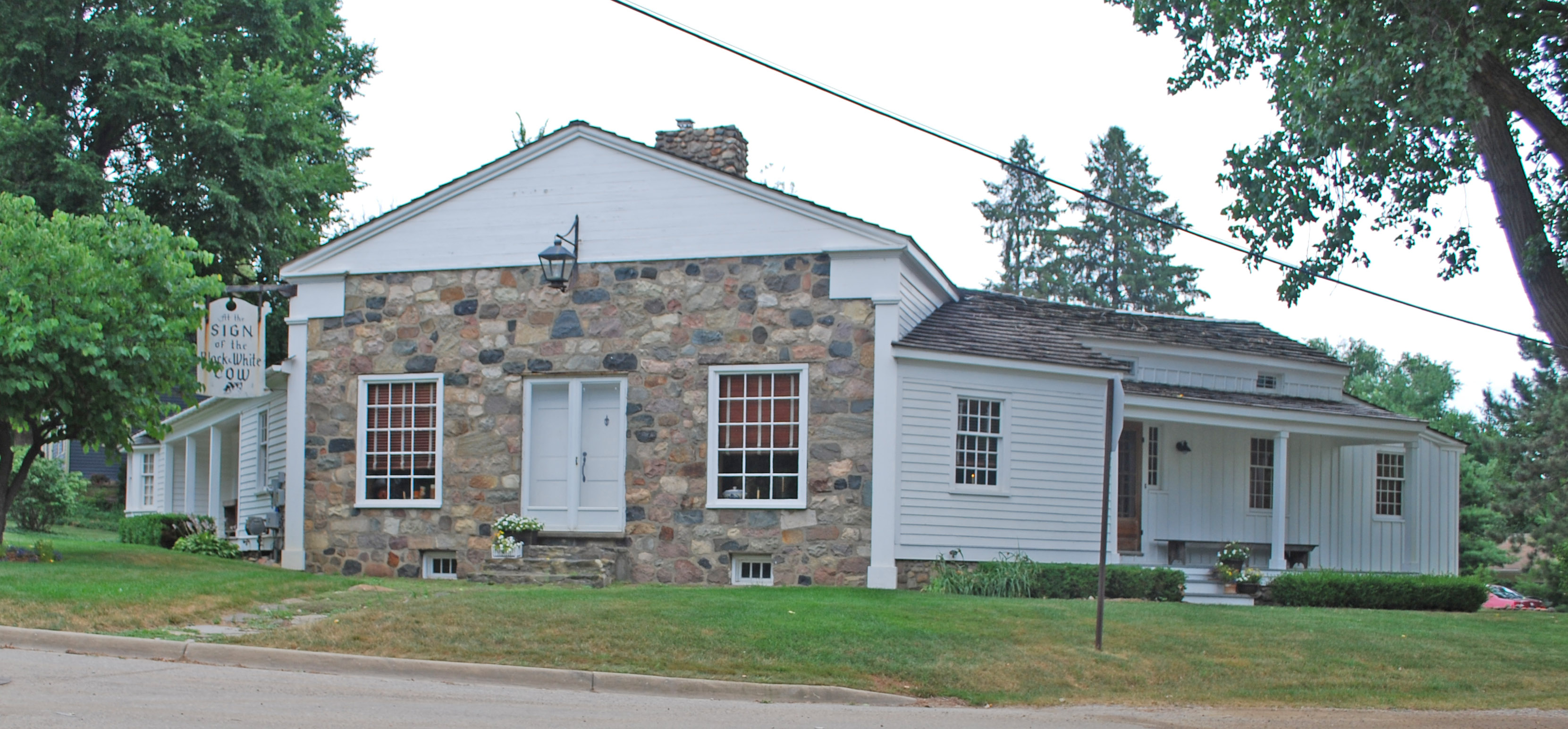
Inn

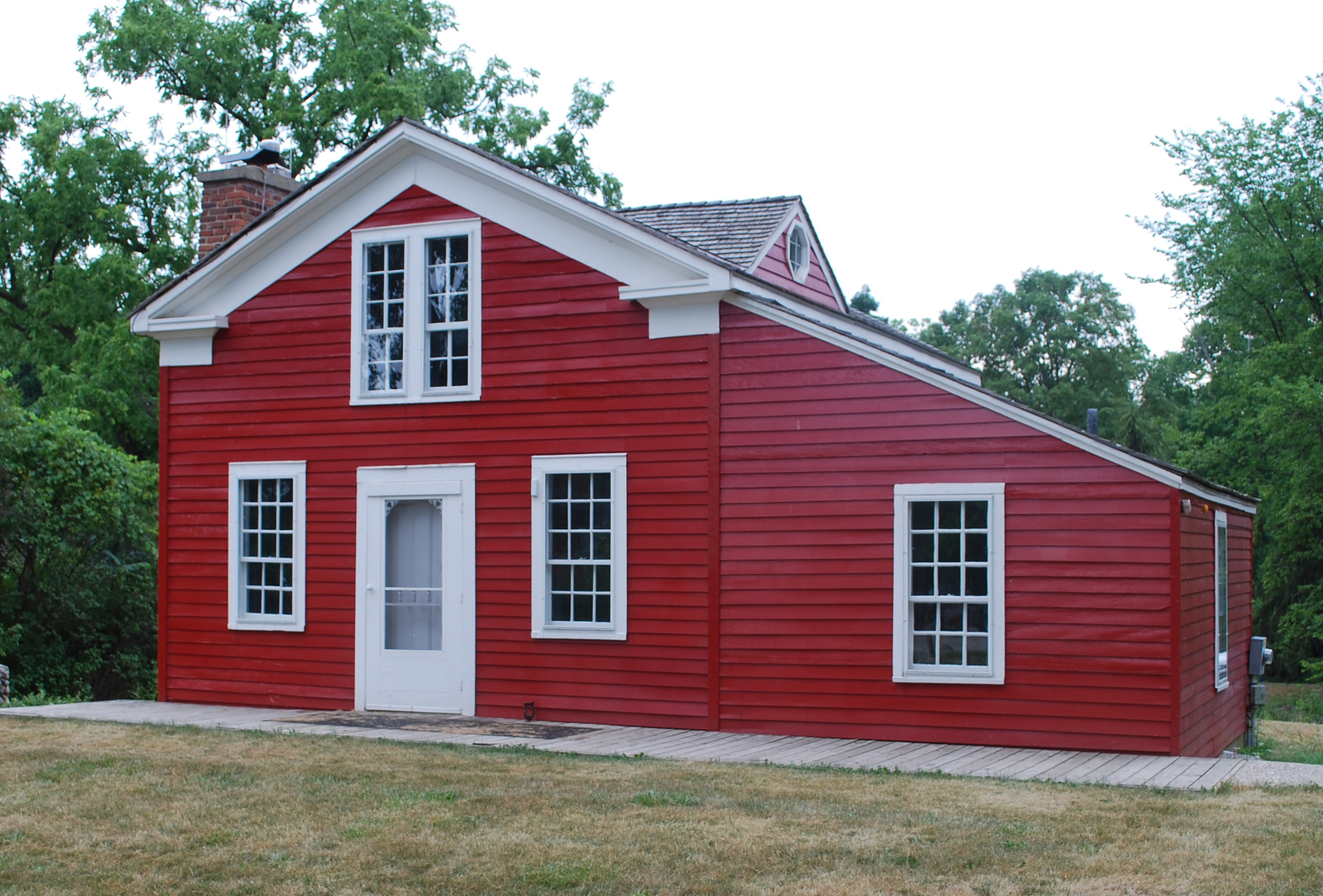
Red House

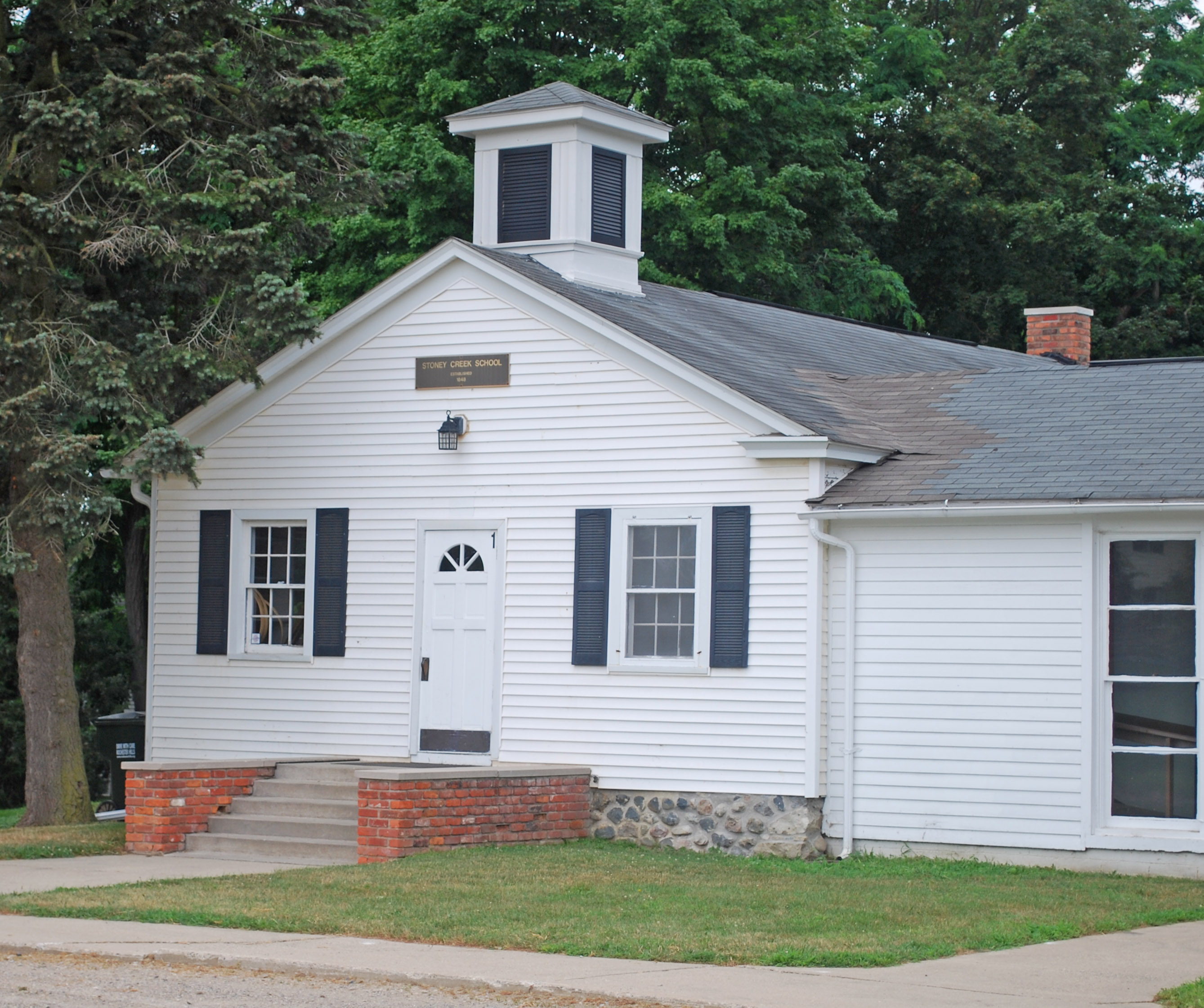
School

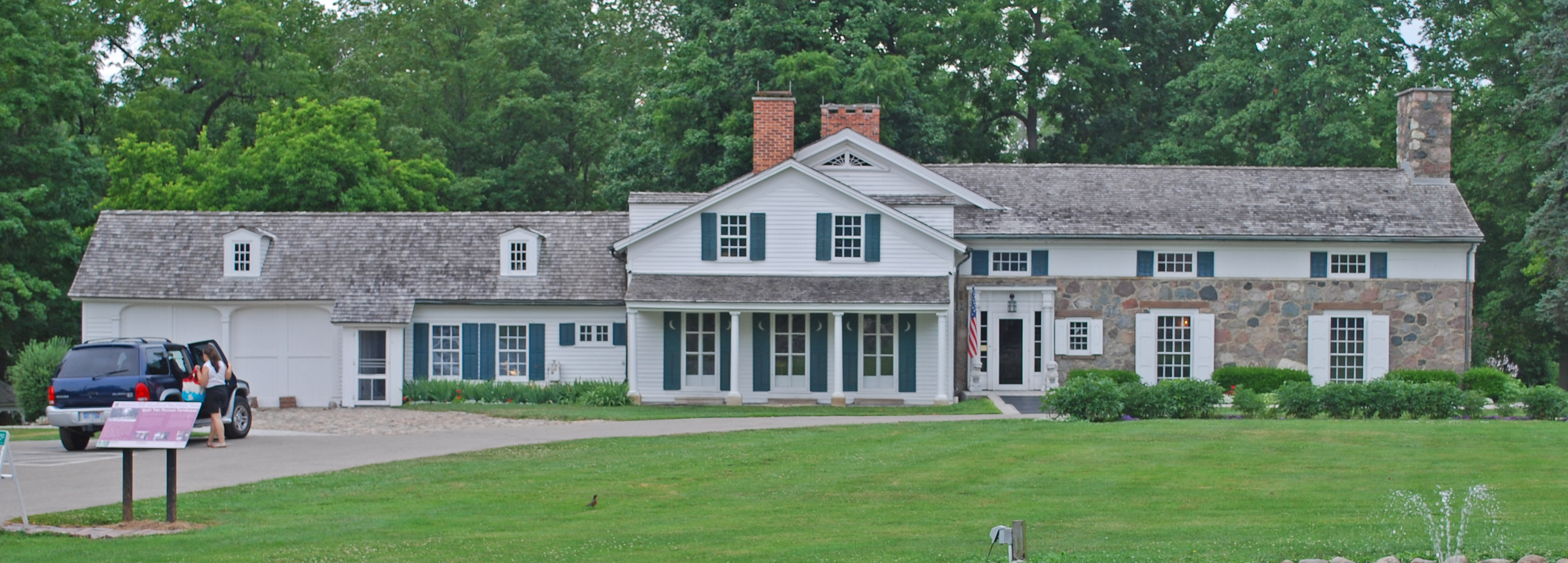
Van Hoosen House

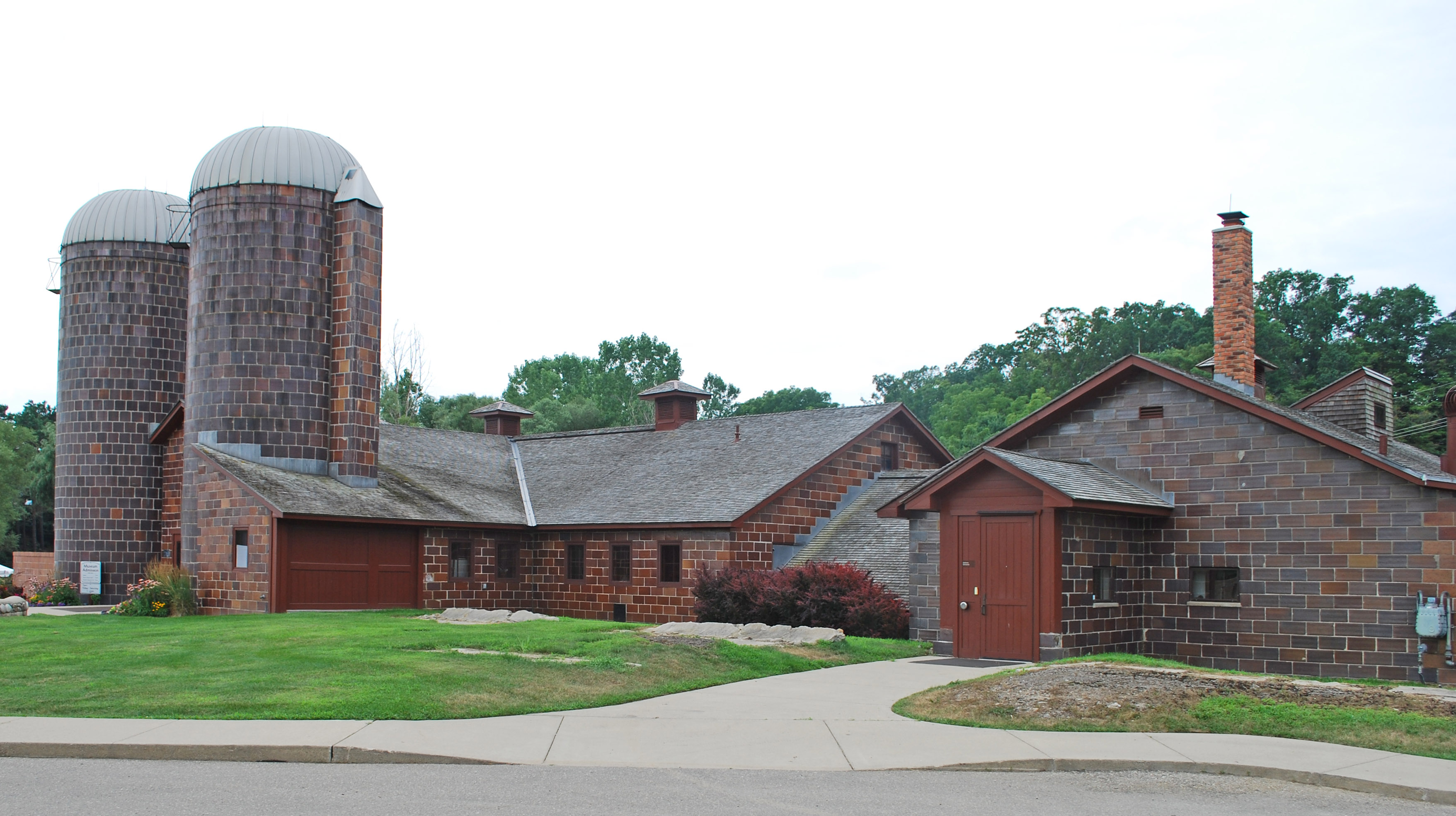
Van Hoosen Barn

== See also ==
- National Register of Historic Places listings in Oakland County, Michigan
