= Northland Gardens =

- U.S. National Register of Historic Places
- U.S. Historic district
- Interactive map
- Location: Westland Ave., Westhampton Rd., Rutland Dr., and Westover Rd. between Southfield Rd., & the John C. Lodge Freeway, Southfield, Michigan
- Coordinates: 42°26′50″N 83°12′52″W
- Built: 1956
- Built by: Nemers and Lipshaw, Spoon Builders
- Architect: Seymour Levine, Fred J. Horner
- Architectural style: Modern architecture, Colonial Revival
- NRHP reference No.: 100004660
- Added to NRHP: January 24, 2020

Northland Gardens is a residential historic district located along Westland Avenue Westhampton Road, Rutland Drive, and Westover Road between Southfield Road & the John C. Lodge Freeway in Southfield, Michigan. It was listed on the National Register of Historic Places in 2020.

== History ==
The area of Southfield that includes the present Northland Gardens was set aside for residential development in the 1920s, as the rise of the automobile made the farther suburbs more accessible from Detroit. In the late 1940s, the Hudson-Webber Realty Company (the real-estate arm of The J. L. Hudson Company) purchased the Northland Gardens site. They platted the area in 1956. Lots were sold, and the area was substantially built out by 1967. The first residents of Northland Gardens were primarily white, but it quickly integrated and in the 1970s was a popular home for African American families. In fact, the diversity of the neighborhood was touted as one of its attractions to white and black residents alike. The neighborhood has remained a diverse community well into the 21st century.

== Description ==
Northland Gardens is a 47.8-acre residential neighborhood containing 117 houses. Most of these homes are Mid-Century Modern Ranch style structures, with Colonial Revival and Contemporary details. no two houses are alike, and construction is generally of a high quality. Most houses are clad in brick, with colors ranging from black to red to yellow, pink or white. many houses have contrasting wood siding or stone. The lots are primarily rectangular, with wedge-shaped lots located along curves and around the neighborhood cul-de-sacs. Houses are located in the center of the lots, and are typically irregular in plan, with offset porches, garages, or wings. The neighborhood is cohesive, and with very few alterations looks much as it did in the 1970s.

== See also ==
- National Register of Historic Places listings in Oakland County, Michigan
