= List of Michigan State Historic Sites in Oakland County =

Location of Oakland County in Michigan

The following is a list of Michigan State Historic Sites in Oakland County, Michigan. Sites marked with a dagger (†) are also listed on the National Register of Historic Places in Oakland County, Michigan. Those with a double dagger (‡) are also designated National Historic Landmarks.

== Current listings ==
Name	Image	Location	City	Listing date
Academy of the Sacred Heart Informational Designation		1250 Kensington Road	Bloomfield Hills	March 20, 1984
Gregor S. and Elizabeth B. Affleck House†		1925 North Woodward Avenue	Bloomfield Hills	January 19, 1978
Royal Aldrich House†		31110 Eleven Mile Road	Farmington Hills	October 16, 1981
Avon School District No. 5 Schoolhouse		Fourth Street and Wilcox Avenue	Rochester	September 26, 1987
Avon Township School District No. 7 School		2498 Tienken Road	Rochester Hills	February 15, 1990
B. F. Howland Lumber Co.		245 N. Main Street	Milford	July 19, 1990
Henry C. Bach House		30115 Ardmore	Farmington Hills	April 19, 1990
Bagley Inn		101 West Long Lake Road	Bloomfield Hills	December 8, 1977
Fred A. Baker House		10505 Lasalle Boulevard	Huntington Woods	December 5, 1986
Barn Church		4230 Livernois Road	Troy	February 7, 1977
Battle Alley Historic District		102 S Broad St; 125, 127, 201 S Saginaw; 106, 108, 109, 111, 117 Battle Alley (Martha St)	Holly	May 17, 1978
Edward E. Beals House		31805 Bond Street	Farmington Hills	January 16, 1990
Berkley Fire Hall and Village Offices		Coolidge Highway and Rosemont Road	Berkley	July 21, 1988
Bissell House		334 Union	Milford	July 26, 1974
Botsford Inn†		28000 Grand River	Farmington Hills	February 19, 1958
Lemuel Botsford House		24414 Farmington Road	Farmington Hills	October 16, 1981
Botsford-Graser House†		24105 Locust Drive	Farmington Hills	February 29, 1996
General Hugh Brady House		31610 Evergreen Road	Beverly Hills	January 17, 1986
Daniel Broughton House		32325 Franklin Road	Franklin	December 17, 1987
Marcus Burrowes House		24300 Locust Drive	Farmington Hills	October 16, 1981
Charles Bissel Button House		34600 Twelve Mile Road	Farmington Hills	March 16, 1982
Byers Farm		213 Commerce Road, just west of South Commerce Road (Carroll Lake Rd)	Commerce Township	April 5, 1974
Byers Homestead		213 Commerce Road	Commerce	April 5, 1974
Campbell House		3112-3114 Hilton Road	Ferndale	June 28, 1973
Carver Elementary School		21272 Mendota	Ferndale	November 16, 1995
Caswell House†		60 West Wattles Road	Troy	January 13, 1972
Cataract House		54 S Broadway	Lake Orion	February 10, 1983
Edward Chene House		29920 Ardmore	Farmington Hills	January 20, 2000
Chief Pontiac Informational Designation		Public Fishing Site on Orchard Lake	Orchard Lake	January 24, 1958
City of Rochester Informational Designation		400 Sixth Street	Rochester	December 12, 1979
Clarkston Village Historic District†		Located in the southern part of Independence Township along M-15. The historic district includes Buffalo Street, Church Street, Clarkston Road, Depot Road, Holcomb Street, Main Street (M-15), Miller Road, Waldon Road and Washington Street, and includes over 100 historic structures.	Clarkston	January 16, 1976
Clinton-Kalamazoo Canal†		Bloomer State Park No. 2, Rochester-Utica Recreation Area, one mile east of Rochester, off John R and Bloomer Roads	Rochester Hills	September 25, 1956
Clinton Valley Center† (demolished)		140 Elizabeth Lake Road	Pontiac	September 17, 1974
Commerce District No. 10 Schoolhouse		4875 Comstock Street, 2 blocks north of Commerce Road	Commerce	April 10, 1986
Commerce Methodist Episcopal Church		1155 West Commerce Road, SW corner of Bogie Lake Road	Union Lake vicinity	February 28, 1986
Commerce Roller Mill		Commerce Road in Commerce Village, 1/8 mile west of Carroll Lake Road	Commerce Village	March 20, 1984
Commerce Village Burying Ground		East Commerce Road, NW of Newton Road	Commerce Township	August 23, 1990
Congregation Shaarey Zedek Commemorative Designation		27375 Bell Road	Southfield	December 5, 1986
Cranbrook‡		500 Lone Pine Road	Bloomfield Hills	February 11, 1972
Crapo Park Informational Site		Bounded by Martha St. (Battle Alley), Washington St, and Grand Trunk Western Railroad	Holly	July 29, 1980
Cornelius Davis House		30605 Inkster	Farmington Hills	July 20, 1989
James Harvey Davis House		12451 Andersonville Road	Davisburg	November 15, 1973
Samuel Davis House		32330 Twelve Mile Road	Farmington Hills	October 16, 1981
Decker Settlement		1330 Greenshield Road	Lake Orion	July 15, 1999
Detroit Finnish Co-operative Summer Camp		2524 Loon Lake Road	Wixom	October 16, 1997
Detroit Zoological Park		8450 West Ten Mile Road	Huntington Woods/Royal Oak	October 16, 1997
Drayton Plains State Fish Hatchery		2125 Denby Drive	Drayton Plains	August 24, 1984
Dunning-Schoenemann House		514 North Main	Milford	June 15, 1979
Eber Durham House		35835 Thirteen Mile Road	Farmington Hills	December 19, 1984
Emmendorfer House		4121 Pontiac Trail	Orchard Lake	March 23, 1983
Caleb Everts House†		8880 Hickory Ridge Road	Rose Center vicinity	June 15, 1979
Farmington Historic District†		Grand River Avenue and Shiawassee Avenue from Warner Street to junction of Grand River and Shiawassee	Farmington	July 26, 1974
Farmington Unitarian Church		25301 Halsted Road	Farmington	October 16, 1981
Joseph G. Farr House		4553 Commerce Road	Commerce Township	November 16, 1995
Ferndale School		130 East Nine Mile Road	Ferndale	March 22, 1983
First Baptist Church		34 Oakland Avenue at Saginaw Avenue	Pontiac	March 18, 1961
First Baptist Church of Royal Oak		309 North Main Street	Royal Oak	December 15, 1988
First Congregational Church		65 East Huron	Pontiac	March 18, 1961
First Episcopal Church		171 West Pike Street	Pontiac	March 18, 1961
First Methodist Episcopal Church		14 Judson Street	Pontiac	March 18, 1961
First Presbyterian Church		SE corner of West Huron and Wayne streets	Pontiac	March 18, 1961
First Presbyterian Church		205 East Lake Street	South Lyon	April 20, 1995
First Quaker Meeting Informational Designation		Farmington Municipal Building - Grand River, 1 block west of Farmington Road	Farmington	March 23, 1965
Dr. Henry K. Foote House†		213 West Huron Street	Milford	July 26, 1978
Ford-Peabody House		325 Woodward Avenue	Birmingham	November 15, 1973
Elizabeth Denison Forth Informational Site		Oak Hill Cemetery, 216 University Drive	Pontiac	July 16, 1992
Four Towns Methodist Church		6451 Cooley Lake Road	Union Lake	March 9, 1966
Fractional School District No. 10 Schoolhouse		3995 West South Boulevard, SE corner of Adams Road	Troy	December 19, 1984
Franklin Boulevard Historic District†		Roughly bounded by Grand Trunk Western Railroad, Orchard Lake Avenue, Miller and West Huron streets	Pontiac	April 10, 1986
Franklin Cemetery		26480 Scenic Drive	Franklin	July 15, 1999
Franklin Village Informational Designation		On Village Green, Franklin Road between Carol and Wellington streets	Franklin	March 25, 1960
Franklin Village School		32220 Franklin Road	Franklin	January 19, 1978
Harry Frink House		2246 Oxford Road	Oxford	May 10, 1990
Jacob and Rebecca Fuerst Farmstead†		24000 Taft Road	Novi	June 29, 2000
John Garfield House		35810 Thirteen Mile Road	Farmington Hills	October 16, 1981
German School		32240 Middlebelt Road	Farmington Hills	October 16, 1981
Glen Oaks		30500 Thirteen Mile Road	Farmington Hills	October 16, 1981
Luman W. Goodenough House		24705 Farmington Road	Farmington Hills	July 26, 1978
Goodenough-Spicer Stable		24915-C Farmington Road	Farmington Hills	December 5, 1996
Gray-Spicer House		24915-C Farmington Road	Farmington Hills	December 5, 1996
Silas Green House		28001 Ten Mile Road	Farmington Hills	October 16, 1981
Greenwood Cemetery		Oak Street, between Greenwood and Lakeview roads	Birmingham	July 18, 1991
U. S. Hackett Block		5 Washington (Lapeer) Road, south of Burdick St	Oxford	July 18, 1996
John Dallas Harger House		36500 Twelve Mile Road	Farmington Hills	July 20, 1989
Hathaway-Hess Farm		825 South Williams Lake Road	Waterford Township	September 7, 1989
Hibbard Tavern		115 Summit	Milford	April 24, 1979
Higley-Farr House		316 Farr Street	Commerce Village	January 8, 1981
Holly Town Hall		102 Front Street	Holly	August 22, 1985
Howarth United Methodist Church School		Bald Mountain Road	Auburn Heights vicinity	January 27, 1983
Hubbard-Kesby House†		1965 Dawson Road	Milford	November 16, 1995
John W. Hunter House†		556 West Maple Road	Birmingham	June 19, 1971
Stephen Jennings House		26337 Drake Road	Farmington Hills	December 19, 1984
Hamilton Jones House		36510 Twelve Mile Road	Farmington Hills	October 16, 1981
Kelley-Fisk Farm		9180 Highland Road	White Lake	September 24, 1992
Cyrus Kilburn Farm		3724 Noble Road, east of Delano Road	Oxford vicinity	June 21, 1990
Kresge Foundation Informational Designation		3215 West Big Beaver Road	Troy	July 26, 1974
Lake Orion Community Church		21 East Church Street	Lake Orion	June 15, 1979
Lake Orion Methodist Church		140 East Flint Street, SW corner of Slater	Lake Orion	September 29, 1972
Lake Orion Town Hall		37 East Flint Street	Lake Orion	January 8, 1981
Lakeville Hall		1469 Milmine Street	Lakeville	May 17, 1978
Lawnridge Hall		1385 South Adams Road	Rochester Hills	October 10, 1989
Lawrence Institute of Technology Informational Designation		2100 West Ten Mile Road	Southfield	November 14, 1961
Masonic Block		400–404 Main / 111–115 East Fourth, Northeast corner of Main and East Fourth Streets	Rochester	August 21, 1987
Willard M. McConnell House		206 Auburn Avenue	Pontiac	January 20, 1984
McPherson Oil Co. Service Station		239 N Main Street	Milford	July 19, 1990
Meadow Brook Farms†		480 South Adams Road	Rochester Hills	November 3, 1976
Methodist Episcopal Church†		33112 Grand River Avenue	Farmington	2007
Methodist Episcopal Church of Highland Station†		205 West Livingston Road	Highland	March 16, 1981
Michigan's First Tri-Level Intersection		Woodward Avenue at Eight Mile Road	Ferndale	2007
Milford Rural Agricultural School†		630 Hickory Street	Milford	September 21, 1988
Edward N. Moseman House		33203 Biddestone	Farmington Hills	June 20, 1991
Mount Avon Cemetery		Third and Wilcox streets	Rochester	August 3, 1979
Theron Murray House		30943 Halsted Road	Farmington Hills	October 16, 1981
Myrick-Palmer House†		223 West Huron Street	Pontiac	May 9, 1969
Nardin Park United Methodist Church Informational Designation		29887 W Eleven Mile Road	Farmington Hills	July 21, 1990
Newman African Methodist Episcopal Church Commemorative Designation		233 Bagley	Pontiac	February 29, 1996
John Norris House		3497 Auburn Road	Auburn Hills	July 17, 1986
Oak Grove Cemetery		Garden Road	Milford Township	September 10, 1979
Oak Hill Cemetery†		216 University Drive	Pontiac	August 21, 1987
Oakland County Courthouse Informational Site (delisted)		Southwest corner of Saginaw and Huron streets	Pontiac	February 17, 1970
Oakland County Informational Designation		Oakland County Courthouse, 1200 N Telegraph, just north of Elizabeth Lake Road	Pontiac	November 18, 1965
Oaklands Model Home		29615 Green Acres	Farmington Hills	April 19, 1990
Old Oak		6115 Wing Lake Road	Birmingham vicinity	October 9, 1978
Orchard Lake Chapel		5171 Commerce Road, between Hiller and Orchard Lake roads	Orchard Lake	July 26, 1974
Orchard Lake Schools Historic District†		North shore of Orchard Lake between Commerce and Orchard Lake Roads	Orchard Lake	July 26, 1974
Ortonville Methodist Episcopal Church		91 Church St	Ortonville	February 10, 1983
Ortonville Mill†		366 Mill Street	Ortonville	November 6, 1970
Oxford Methodist Episcopal Church (Demolished)		21 East Burdick	Oxford	June 17, 1978
Oxford Savings Bank Building		1 North Washington Street	Oxford	September 24, 1992
Paint Creek Mill Race Commemorative Designation		Orion Road at Gallagher Road	Goodison	January 17, 2002
Jabez Payne-Francis Ingersoll House		5020 Carroll Lake Road	Commerce Township	April 23, 1985
James H. Persall House		3301 Auburn Road, NW corner of Squirrel Road	Auburn Hills	November 20, 1987
Judson and John Pettibone House		36400 Twelve Mile Road	Farmington Hills	August 22, 1985
Nathan Philbrick Tavern		26007 Power Road	Farmington Hills	November 16, 1981
Pine Grove† (also known as the Moses Wisner House)		405 Oakland Avenue	Pontiac	September 25, 1956
Pioneer Cemetery		Lahser Road, north of West Ten Mile Road	Southfield	November 20, 1987
The Polar Bears		White Chapel Cemetery, 621 West Long Lake Road	Troy	April 25, 1988
Pontiac Post Office		35 East Huron Street	Pontiac	September 26, 1987
Poppleton School		60 West Wattles Road (moved from 1480 West Big Beaver Road)	Troy	August 22, 1981
Joshua C. Predmore House		244 North Broadway, SW corner of Church Street	Lake Orion	August 3, 1979
Priscilla Calkins Prior House		835 Garner Road	Milford	February 29, 1996
Rackham Golf Course		10100 Ten Mile Road	Huntington Woods	2012
Rochester Informational Designation		400 Sixth Street	Rochester	1980
Rochester Opera House		340 Main Street	Rochester	June 21, 1990
Stephen Yerkes Rodgers House		39040 Nine Mile Road	Farmington Hills	November 7, 1977
Rose Township Hall		204 Franklin Street	Rose Center	July 20, 1982
Roseland Park Mausoleum		Northwest corner of Twelve Mile Road and Woodward Avenue	Berkley	January 27, 1983
Rowe House†		2360 Lone Tree Road, east of Ridge Road	Milford vicinity	September 17, 1974
Royal Oak Methodist Episcopal Church		320 West Seventh Street	Royal Oak	June 30, 1988
Royal Oak Township Cemetery / Saint Mary Catholic Cemetery		Bounded by Twelve Mile and Rochester Roads and Main Street	Royal Oak	April 18, 1996
Royal Oak Woman's Club		404 South Pleasant Street	Royal Oak	June 15, 1979
S. S. Kresge Company Informational Site		3100 Big Beaver Road	Troy	July 26, 1974
Saginaw Trail Informational Designation / John Almon Starr House		3123 Crooks Road	Royal Oak	September 17, 1957
Saint Patrick's Catholic Church		Union Lake Road at Hutchins Road	Oxbow vicinity	April 11, 1977
Saint Vincent de Paul Catholic Church, School and Convent†		150 East Wide Track Drive, at Whittemore Street	Pontiac	April 28, 1987
Sashabaw Cemetery		5331 Maybee Road, east of Sashabaw Road	Clarkston vicinity	June 2, 1966
Sashabaw Presbyterian Church†		5331 Maybee Road	Clarkston vicinity	September 18, 1964
Samuel Saterlee House		4805 North Adams Road	Bloomfield Hills vicinity	March 19, 1980
Scripps-Wildwood Farm Historic District		Josyln Court, West Josyln Road and south of Scripps Road	Orion Township	March 16, 1989
Seymour Lake Methodist Episcopal Church		3050 Sashabaw Road, NW corner of Seymour Lake Road	Ortonville vicinity	June 15, 1984
David Simmons House		22000 Haggerty	Farmington Hills	October 16, 1981
Lawrence Simmons House		33742 Twelve Mile Road	Farmington Hills	August 12, 1983
South Commerce Burying Ground		NE corner of Wixom and Maple roads	Wixom	October 23, 1987
South Lyon Elevator		415 East Lake Street	South Lyon	January 25, 1985
Southfield Cemetery		23520 Civic Center Drive	Southfield	November 20, 1987
Southfield Centre Commemorative Designation		24350 Civic Center Drive	Southfield	June 17, 1993
Southfield Town Hall		26082 Berg Road	Southfield	January 16, 1990
Southfield United Presbyterian Church		2157510 Mile Rd	Southfield	July 17, 1997
Spicer Barn		24915-C Farmington Road	Farmington Hills	December 5, 1996
Rollin Sprague Building†		300 Main Street	Rochester	July 15, 1999
Helen Sprague-Cork House		53481 West Ten Mile Road	South Lyon vicinity	February 23, 1981
Washington Stanley Farm†		3231 Beaver Road	Troy	June 19, 1971
John Almon Starr House		3123 Crooks Road	Royal Oak	November 26, 1985
Orson Starr House		3123 North Main Street	Royal Oak	August 6, 1976
Frank Steele House		35810 Eleven Mile Road	Farmington Hills	January 16, 1990
Stoney Creek School		Washington Road near Runyon Road	Rochester Hills	2005
Stoney Creek Village† (currently used as the Van Hoosen Farm Museum)		1005 Van Hoosen Rd	Rochester	1982
Stony Creek Cemetery		Letica Drive near Romeo Road	Rochester	2006
Stony Creek Masonic Lodge / Mount Moriah Commemorative Designation		Along the Old Romeo Trail, near the Van Hoosen Farm Museum	Rochester Hills	November 16, 1995
Stout Memorial Library		47 Williams Street	Pontiac	October 23, 1979
Joshua B. Taylor House		487 Gunn Road	Oakland Township	December 15, 1988
Temple Beth El		7400 Telegraph Road	Bloomfield Hills	April 12, 2001
Terry House		1081 West Auburn Road	Rochester Hills	July 26, 1974
Mary Thompson House		25630 Evergreen	Southfield	August 26, 1999
Daniel Thorne House		32805 Wing Lake Road	Franklin	built 1837
Charles Torrey House†		1141 Foxwood Court	Bloomfield Township	October 12, 1990
Township Hall		407 Pine Street	Rochester	March 28, 1979
Troy Corners Informational Site		Square Lake Road and Livernois Road	Troy	May 10, 1968
Historic Green Informational Site		60 West Wattles Road	Troy	January 18, 1980
Troy Township Informational Site		East side of Livernois Road, south of Wattles Road	Troy	October 15, 1992
George W. Vandeventer Home		404 West Third Street	Rochester	January 22, 1998
Walled Lake School		207 Liberty Street, at Market Street	Walled Lake	February 23, 1981
Governor Fred Warner House		35805 Grand River Avenue	Farmington	February 11, 1972
Waterford Village Historic District†		Dubay and Pontiff Streets; Steffens, Andersonville and Airport Roads	Waterford	June 18, 1976
Wattles House		3864 Livernois	Troy	April 11, 1977
Western Knitting Mill†		400 Water Street	Rochester	March 13, 2003
White Lake Cemetery		6190 White Lake Road	Clarkston vicinity	August 21, 1986
Samuel White House		46040 Nine Mile Road, between Beck and Taft roads	Novi	February 23, 1981
Williams Settlement of the Saginaw Trail		North of Pontiac on US-10, Sec. 11, T3N, R9E	Pontiac vicinity	August 23, 1956
Willis-Byrnes House		129 Shadbolt	Lake Orion	June 6, 1977
Austin Wing House		5841 Wing Lake Road	Birmingham vicinity	August 21, 1986
Winkler's Mill (Demolished)		6381 Winkler Mill Road (Marker at Rochester Area Historical Society Museum)	Rochester Hills	July 15, 1968
Witch's Hat Depot		300 Dorothy Street in McHattie Park	South Lyon	August 22, 1981
Wixom-Wire House		687 North Wixom Road	Wixom	February 10, 1983
Joseph D. Yerkes House† Commemorative Designation		42580 Eight Mile Road	Novi	September 21, 1983
Robert Yerkes House†		535 East Base Line Road	Northville	May 14, 1975

== See also ==
- National Register of Historic Places listings in Oakland County, Michigan
- List of Michigan State Historical Markers in Oakland County

== Sources ==
- Historic Sites Online – Oakland County. Michigan State Housing Developmental Authority. Accessed May 28, 2011.
