= Four Towns =

Four Towns or Four Town may refer to:

- Four Towns, Michigan
- Four Town Lake, a lake in Minnesota
