= Franklin Boulevard =

Franklin Boulevard may refer to:

- A segment of County Route J8 (California)
- Franklin Boulevard (Maryland)
- Franklin Boulevard Historic District (disambiguation)
