= Dr. Henry K. Foote House =

- U.S. National Register of Historic Places
- Michigan State Historic Site
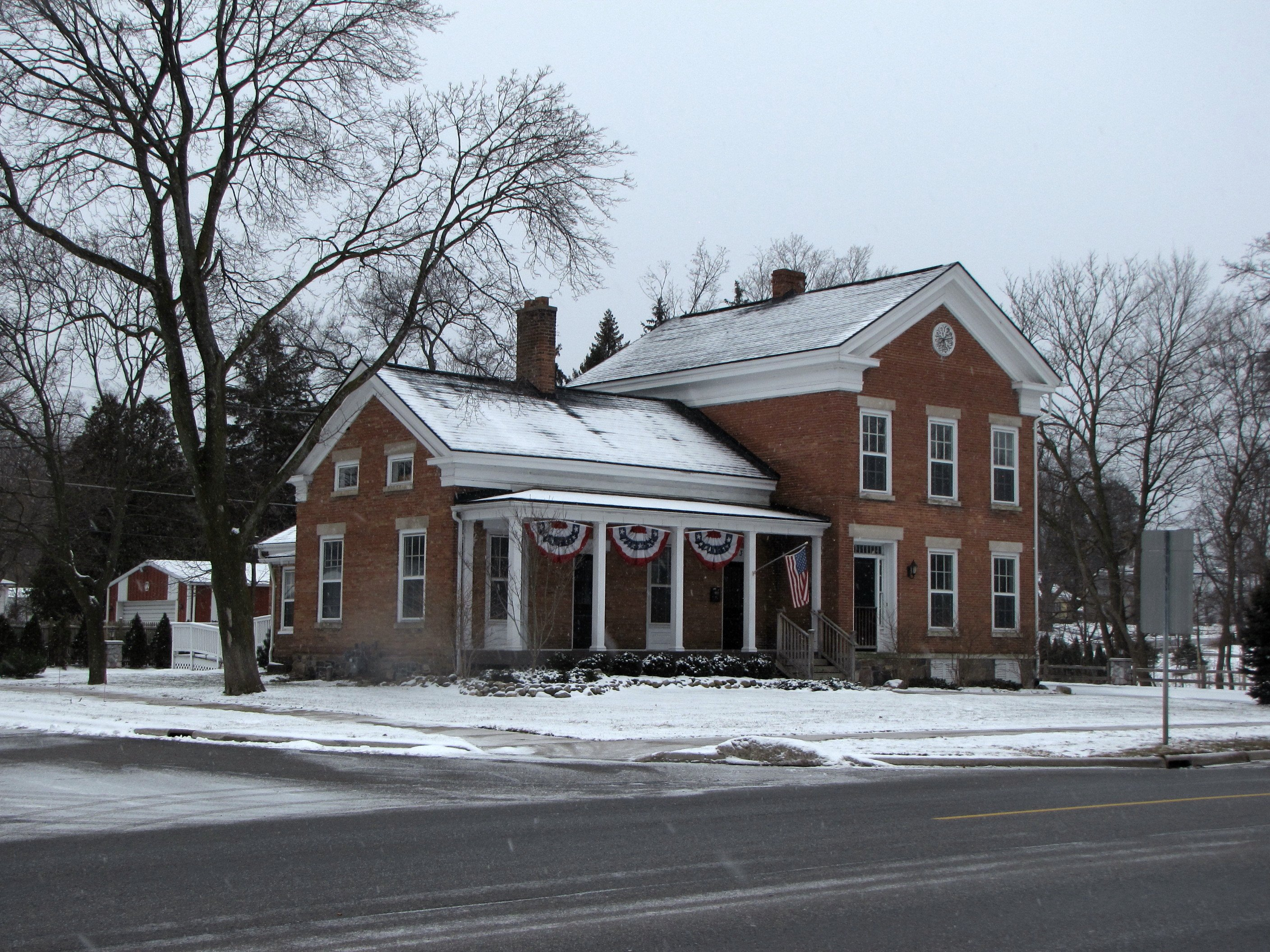
- Interactive map
- Location: 213 W. Huron St., Milford, Michigan
- Coordinates: 42°35′06″N 83°36′07″W
- Area: 0.4 acres (0.16 ha)
- Built: 1858
- Architectural style: Greek Revival
- NRHP reference No.: 85000062
- Added to NRHP: January 11, 1985

The Dr. Henry K. Foote House is a single-family home located at 213 West Huron Street in Milford, Michigan, U.S. It was listed on the National Register of Historic Places in 1985.

== History ==
Dr. Henry K. Foote was born in 1803 in East Haddam, Connecticut, educated in Connecticut and Vermont, he trained as a physician in Albany, New York. In 1834, Foote and his wife Minerva moved to Michigan, settling in Wixom. In 1834/35, the Footes purchased two lots in the village of Milford, which at that time was just beginning to be settled. They constructed a small wood-frame house on the lots, and in 1837 the Footes moved permanently to Milford. Dr. Foote was the first physician in the community. Foote established a successful medical practice in the area, often ministering to patients who lived in outlying rural areas. He also served in the State legislature.

In 1858, Henry and Minerva Foote had this brick house constructed for them. However, in 1862, Foote enlisted in the army to fight in the Civil War, and served as a company surgeon. He died in 1863 in Poolesville, Maryland of pneumonia. Minerva Foote continued to live in the house, expanded it some time in the late 1860s or early 1870s, and continued to occupy it until her death in 1882. The house was passed to the Foote's daughter Mary Foote Nutting and her husband T. Dwight Nutting. The Nuttings soon moved, however, and ownership of the house transferred to two of Dr. Foote's sons, James L. and Charles C. Foote. The brothers in turn gave the house to the United Presbyterian and Congregational Church of Milford, which used the house as its manse from 1889 to 1911. Since that time, the house had a variety of owners, including the Milford Historical Society and Muriel Valley Foote, wife of William Henderson Foote, a great-great-grandson of the original owner.

== Description ==
The Dr. Henry K. Foote House is a two-story brick Greek Revival house with a one-and-one-half-story wing on one side and a one-story utilitarian wing in the rear. The house sits on a stone foundation. The main facade has a door and two windows on the main floor and three identical evenly spaced windows at the second floor level. The door has multi-paned sidelights and a rectangular transom. The windows are six-over-six units with wide wood moldings, narrow stone sills and prominent rectangular stone lintels. Above, the roof is low pitched with a simple wood cornice. The wing is of similar construction to the main section of the house. It includes a large wood parch extending across the front facade.

On the interior, a long stair hall is located to one side, with a parlor off the hall. A single large room is in the rear. Upstairs is a hall with a main bedroom, and a short side hall leading to two more rooms.

== See also ==
- National Register of Historic Places listings in Oakland County, Michigan
