= Hubbard-Kesby House =

- U.S. National Register of Historic Places
- Michigan State Historic Site
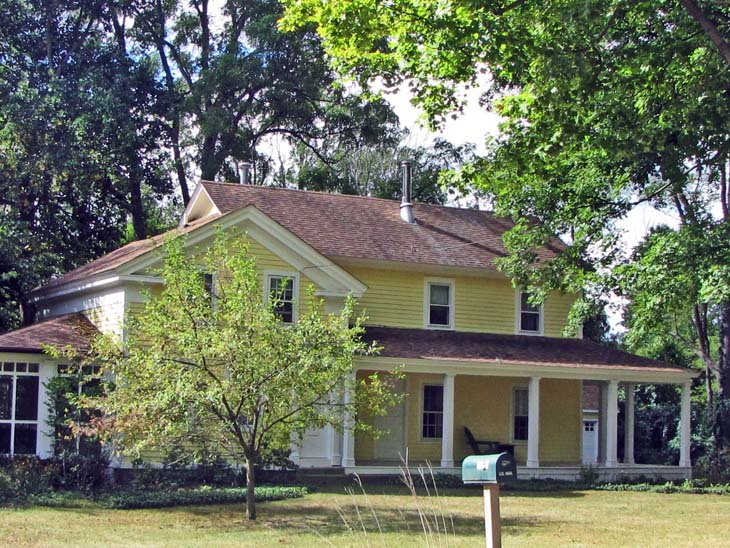

- Location within Michigan Location within the United States
- Interactive map
- Location: 1965 W. Dawson Rd., Milford, Michigan
- Coordinates: 42°33′49″N 83°38′08″W
- Area: 6 acres (2.4 ha)
- Built: c. 1835
- Architectural style: Greek Revival
- NRHP reference No.: 96000612
- Added to NRHP: June 3, 1996

The Hubbard-Kesby House, also known as the John and Betsy Moore Kesby House, is a single-family home located at 1965 West Dawson Road in Milford, Michigan. It was listed on the National Register of Historic Places in 1996.

== History ==
The Hubbard-Kesby house exemplifies the evolution of pioneer-era farmhouses in Michigan.

In 1833, Samuel Hubbard purchased 80 acres of land and over the next few years built this house on the property. In 1841, the Hubbards sold the farm to John and Betsy Moore Kesby, who had emigrated to America from England and originally settled on a neighboring parcel in 1834.

After purchasing this farm, the Kesbys prospered. Betsy Moore Kesby's son John went on to become active in politics, serving as mayor of Saginaw and running as the Democratic nominee for governor of Michigan in 1868. The farm was sold to Jonathan Phillips in 1876. Phillips remodeled and enlarged the house in 1905.

== Description ==
The Hubbard-Kesby House is a post-and-beam Greek Revival upright and wing house, which was expanded in 1905. The house is on a fieldstone foundation. The house was originally built as a 1-1/2 story structure; the upright section was later increased to two stories. It has the classic Greek Revival cornice returns and cornerboards along the edges. Covered porches run along three sides.

== See also ==
- National Register of Historic Places listings in Oakland County, Michigan
