= Rowe House (Milford, Michigan) =

- U.S. National Register of Historic Places
- Michigan State Historic Site
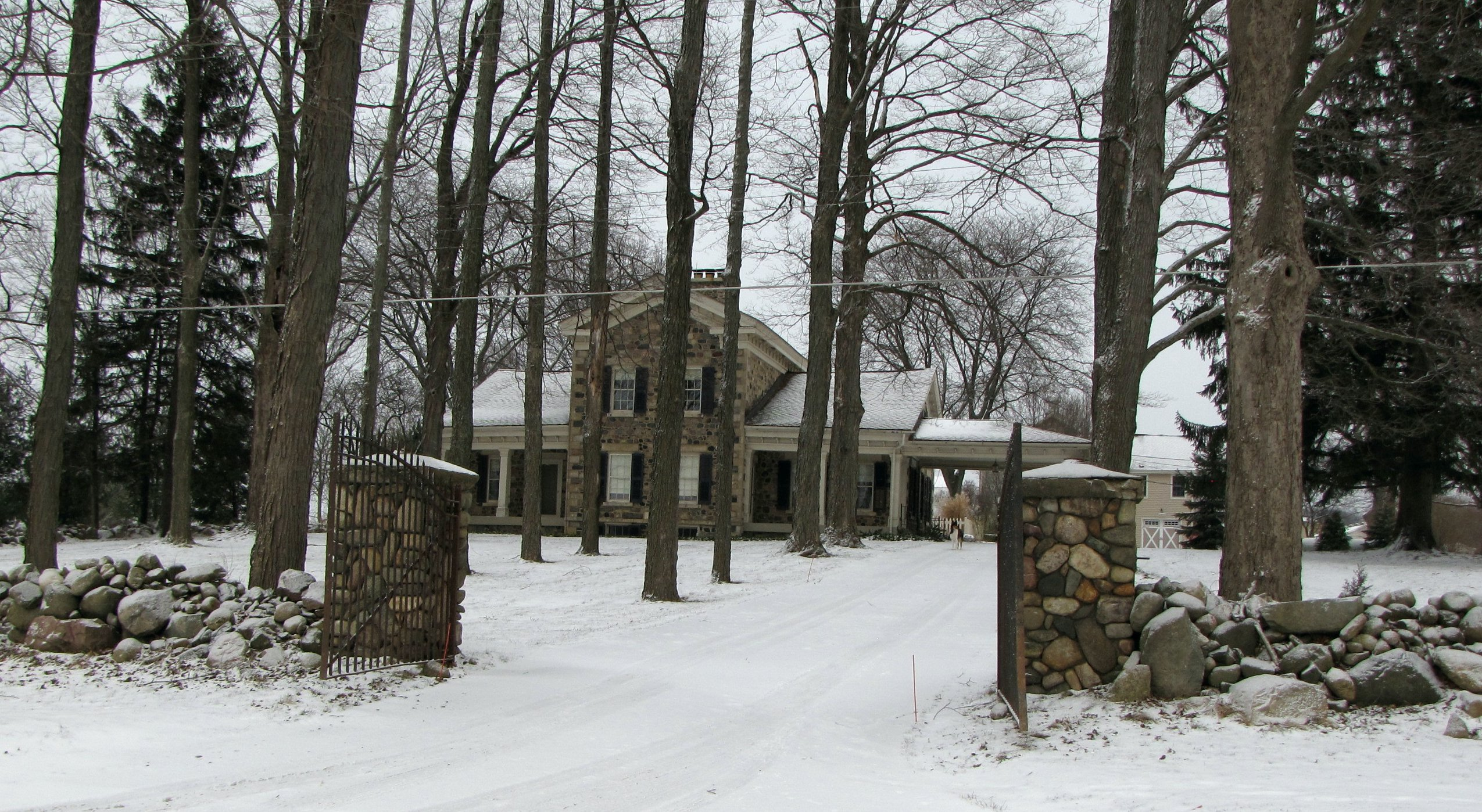
- Interactive map
- Nearest city: Milford, Michigan
- Coordinates: 42°37′21″N 83°38′53″W
- Area: 1 acre (0.40 ha)
- Built: 1855
- Architectural style: Greek Revival
- NRHP reference No.: 75000959
- Added to NRHP: December 6, 1975

The Rowe House is a single-family home at 2360 Lone Tree Road, northwest of Milford, Michigan. It was listed on the National Register of Historic Places in 1975.

== History ==
Squire W. Rowe was born in 1815 in Camillus, New York. After marrying his wife Dolly, he moved to Michigan in 1835 and purchased 40 acres and began farming. Squire Rowe was influential in the community, serving 21 terms as township supervisor. Squire and Dolly Rowe had the house built for them in 1855. Squire continued being active in the community, raising a company for the 13th Michigan Volunteer Infantry Regiment in the Civil War and serving as a member of the state legislature in 1865. His ill health prevented more active service, and he died in 1866.

The Rowe House remained in family hands until 1908. In 1953, Squire and Dolly's great-granddaughter Margaret Rowe Mastick and her husband Earl repurchased the property and restored the house.

== Description ==
The Rowe House is an elegant cut fieldstone Greek Revival house, with a two-story, gable-fronted, rectangular central section, and a one-and-one-half story wing on each side. The fieldstone is irregularly sized, contrasting with the flat, smooth stone quoins, sills and lintels, which project slightly for added contrast. Each wing is fronted with a single-story, two-bay width porch, supported by square Doric columns. The front of the central section contains four double-hung six-over-six sash windows with louvered wooden shutters. The boxed cornice and returns are decorated with delicate scrollwork. In the center of the building is a cobblestone chimney. Unusually for Michigan, a datestone reading "1855" is centrally placed, directly above the cut stone watertable. A carport was added to one wing early in the 20th century.

== See also ==
- National Register of Historic Places listings in Oakland County, Michigan
