= Milford Rural Agricultural School =

- U.S. National Register of Historic Places
- Michigan State Historic Site
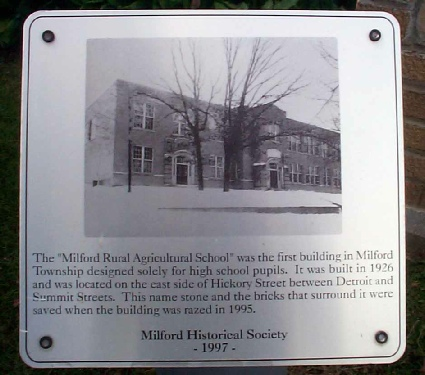
- Interactive map
- Location: 630 Hickory St., Milford, Michigan
- Coordinates: 42°35′38″N 83°35′52″W
- Area: 1.5 acres (0.61 ha)
- Built: 1925
- Architect: Judson N. Churchill
- Architectural style: Arts and Crafts-influenced
- Demolished: 1995
- NRHP reference No.: 91001995
- Added to NRHP: January 22, 1992

The Milford Rural Agricultural School was a school located at 630 Hickory Street in Milford, Michigan. It was listed on the National Register of Historic Places in 1992, and demolished in 1995.

== History ==
Milford was settled in 1831, and the first school was constructed in 1833. By 1840, the area had 12 school districts. In the 1850s, the two-story Milford Union School was built at this site. The school served the village as an elementary and high school until 1883, when it burned. The building was replaced the next year with a new school of approximately the same appearance.

At the turn of the century, improving roads and the rise of the automobile spurred consolidation of formerly sparse rural school districts. In Milford, the consolidation movement got off to a slow start, but in 1921 local citizens voted overwhelmingly in favor of district consolidation. It wasn't until 1925, however, that a consolidation plan was proposed, which would use the existing Milford Union School for the consolidated lower grades, and construct a new building nearby to house high school students. The school board hired Lansing architect Judson Churchill to design a new school building. Construction began in August 1925, and was completed by September 1926, in time for the beginning of the school year.

The Milford Rural Agricultural School served as a high school for area students until 1957, when a new high school was constructed three miles north after the Milford schools became part of the Huron Valley School District. The old high school was then used as a Junior High until 1970, when a new Junior High, the present Muir Middle School, was built, after which the old Union School was torn down and the Rural Agricultural School building was converted to a distribution center for the school district. In 1984 this use was also discontinued, and the building became vacant.

In 1995, the Milford Rural Agricultural School was demolished. The plaque formerly above the entrance was moved to the Milford Historical Museum.

== Description ==
The Milford Rural Agricultural School was a two-story, L-shaped, brick Arts and Crafts building trimmed with limestone. The arched entryway was topped with a parapet, and the exterior brickwork was accented with polychromatic brick work and square limestone medallions. The windows were multi-paned, double-hung units placed in banks of two, three or four, and separated by polychromatic brick work.

On the interior, there was a large multi-story Community room in one wing, used as an auditorium and gymnasium. The first floor also featured a Chemistry Room and Physics Room with a shared Lecture Room, a Domestic Science Room, a Manual Arts Room, and a Finishing Room. On the second floor was an Agriculture Room, two Recitation Rooms, a Domestic Arts Room, a large Assembly Room, and an office.

== See also ==
- National Register of Historic Places listings in Oakland County, Michigan
