= Franklin Boulevard Historic District =

Franklin Boulevard Historic District may refer to:

- Franklin Boulevard Historic District (Pontiac, Michigan), listed on the NRHP in Michigan
- Franklin Boulevard Historic District (Cleveland, Ohio), listed on the NRHP in Ohio
- Franklin Boulevard-West Clinton Avenue Historic District, Cleveland, OH, listed on the NRHP in Ohio
