= Old Oak =

- Elijah Bull House
- U.S. National Register of Historic Places
- Location within Michigan Location within the United States
- Interactive map
- Location: 6115 Wing Lake Rd., Bloomfield Township, Michigan
- Coordinates: 42°33′0″N 83°17′37″W
- Built: 1830
- Architectural style: Federal style
- NRHP reference No.: 100007893
- Added to NRHP: June 29, 2022

Old Oak, also known as the Elijah Bull House, is a c. 1830 Federal style house, located at 6115 Wing Lake Road in Bloomfield Township, Michigan. It was listed on the National Register of Historic Places in 2022.

== History ==
In 1821, Austin Eli Wing acquired 130 acres of property on the shore of what is now Wing Lake. In 1829, he moved to Monroe, Michigan and met the young Elijah Bull. Bull, born in 1801, had just moved to Michigan with his wife Melinda from New York State. In late 1829, Wing sold Bull half of his property; Bull purchased further acreage from a neighbor in 1830. The Bulls moved to this Bloomfield Township in late 1829 or 1830 and constructed a house. Although the exact construction of that house is unknown, the existence of thick interior stone walls in the current structure suggests that the Bulls had a smaller fieldstone dwelling that was later incorporated into the larger house.

Elijah Bull took an active role in the early development of Bloomfield Township, serving as Bloomfield Township's Overseer of Road Districts, school commissioner, school inspector, and Commissioner of Highways. He had five children with his wife Melinda, and married his second wife Mary Ellen in 1841. He lived in this house until his death in 1871. In 1874, his son William sold the farm and house to a neighbor, William P. Durkee. He transferred the farm to his son Walter P. Durkee in 1878; it then passed to William's daughter Hattie Durkee Horn, who sold it to Jefferson M. and Mary Thurber in 1893.

Jefferson Thurber was a businessman and likely never lived on the farm; rather, his son Thomas lived in the house and ran the farm. In 1925, Jefferson M. Thurber sold the farm to a development corporation, the Wing Lake Land Company, who parceled the property into 70 lots. The lot containing the house was purchased by coal company owner John. W. Gillette, Jr. and his wife Louise in 1926; the couple modernized the house, adding interior plumbing and electricity. In 1962, the house was sold to Bill and Nancy Sanders Chickering, and in 1975 to Marilyn and Gerald Tuchow. The Tuchows lived in the house through at least 2022.

== Description ==
The Elijah Bull House is located on a large grassy lot with a massive heritage white oak tree in the front yard. Near the main house are a well and cistern, dating from the 1830s, a well house (post-1860), and a two-story, wood-frame garage built in 1990. The lot slopes, with the house built into the slope such that it has a walk-in lower level.

The Elijah Bull House is a rectangular, five-bay, two-and-one-half story timber frame Federal style house with a shallow side-gabled roof covered with cedar shakes. It is clad with clapboard with cornerboards and rests on a multicolored split fieldstone foundation. A plain cornice is located beneath the eaves and two brick chimneys rise from the roof.

== See also ==
- National Register of Historic Places listings in Oakland County, Michigan
