= Detroit Finnish Co-operative Summer Camp =

- Detroit Finnish Cooperative Summer Camp Association
- U.S. National Register of Historic Places
- U.S. Historic district
- Michigan State Historic Site
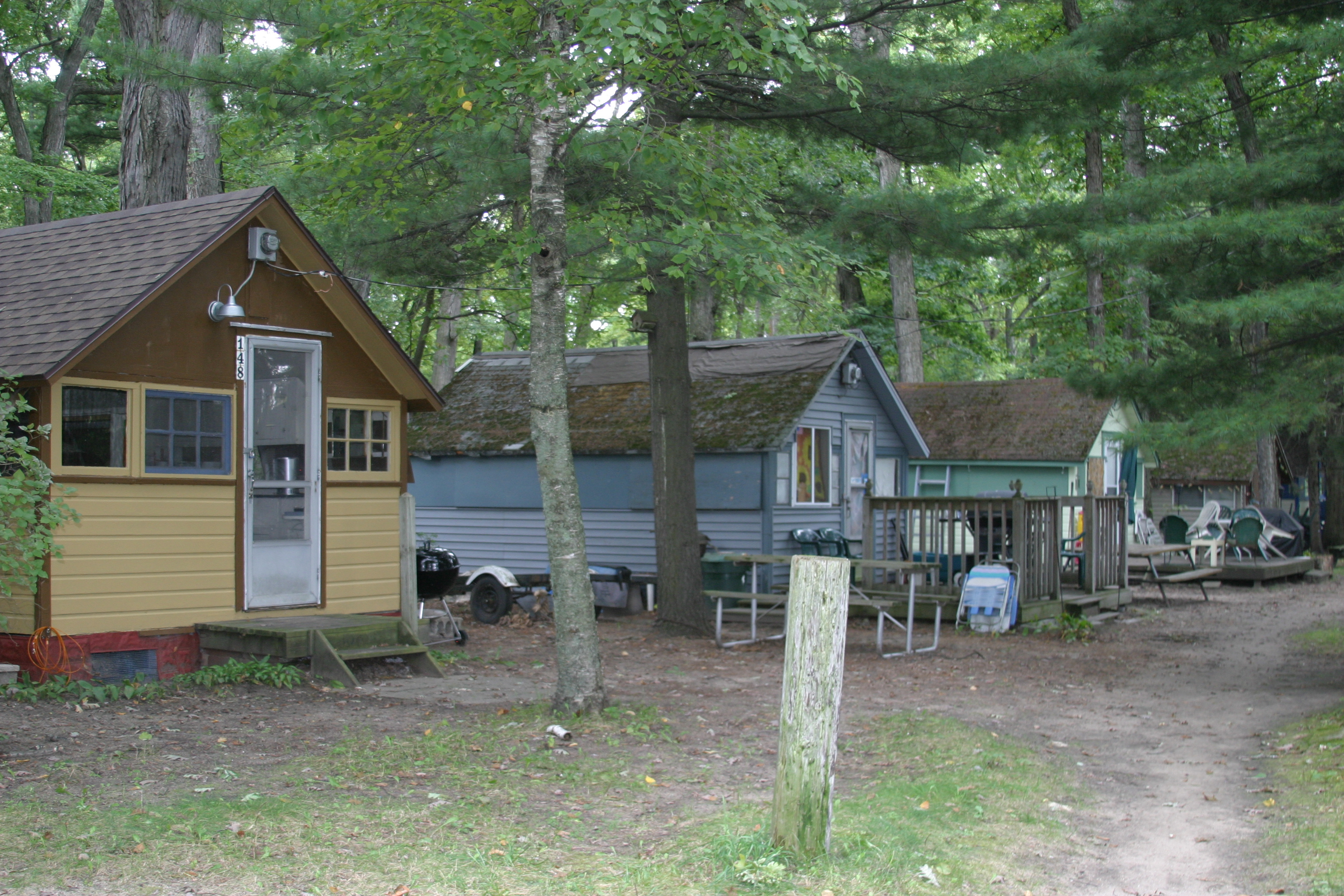

- Location within Michigan Location within the United States
- Interactive map
- Location: 2524 Loon Lake Rd., Wixom, Michigan
- Coordinates: 42°32′55″N 83°31′3″W
- Area: 76 acres (31 ha)
- Built: 1926
- Architectural style: wooden summer camp
- NRHP reference No.: 06000723

Significant dates
- Added to NRHP: January 25, 2007
- Designated MSHS: October 16, 1997

The Detroit Finnish Cooperative Summer Camp Association is a camping facility located at 2524 Loon Lake Road in Wixom, Michigan. It was designated a Michigan State Historic Site in 1997 and listed on the National Register of Historic Places in 2007.

== History ==
In about 1906, a group of Detroit-area people of Finnish descent formed the Detroit Finnish Educational Association to preserve and share the traditions of their native land. The Association members participated in communal summer activities, often renting beaches and parks for camping and swimming. In 1925, the Association formed a committee to select a permanent spot for the group's outdoor activities. After some searching, the committee selected the present site, and formed the Detroit Finnish Cooperative Summer Camp Association as a separate organization, open to anyone who was "of Finnish descent, Finnish speaking, of good character and [living] in the Detroit area." In June 1925, the Summer Camp Association purchased this land with the purpose of constructing a permanent summer camp . The first sauna was constructed in 1926, and the dance hall in 1927.

== Description ==
The Detroit Finnish Cooperative Summer Camp Association, fondly known as “Finn Camp”, is set on a wooded property along Loon Lake, and entirely surrounds the smaller Sun Lake. The property is bounded by Loon Lake, the Hickory Hill Golf and Country Club, the Detroit Finnish Cooperative Summer Camp Association subdivision, and the Loon Lake Estates subdivision.

== See also ==
- National Register of Historic Places listings in Oakland County, Michigan
