= Four Towns, Michigan =

- Unincorporated community
- Location within the state of Michigan
- Coordinates: 42°37′04″N 83°24′49″W
- Country: United States
- State: Michigan
- County: Oakland
- Townships: Commerce, Waterford, West Bloomfield, and White Lake
- Settled: 1830
- Time zone: UTC-5 (EST)
  - Summer (DST): UTC-4 (EDT)
- ZIP code(s): 48327 (Waterford)
- Area code: 248
- FIPS code: 26-84240
- GNIS feature ID: 1627218

Four Towns is an unincorporated community in Oakland County in the U.S. state of Michigan. The community is located at the junction of Commerce, Waterford, West Bloomfield, and White Lake township. As an unincorporated community, Four Towns has no legally defined area or population statistics of its own, and it uses the Waterford 48328 ZIP Code.

== First Settlers ==
In 1830, Harley Olmstead, from Rensselaer County, New York, was the first to settle in what would become Four Towns.

In 1832, John K. Dewey, from Windsor County, Vermont, built the first frame house in Four Towns. That same year, Nathan R. Colvin brought his family from Clarendon, Vermont and built a farmhouse at Four Towns.

== Post Office ==
Four Towns had a post office from 1856 until 1902. It was given the name "Four Towns P.O." because of the four townships meeting there. Squire Cooley was its first postmaster.

== Church ==
The first church in Four Towns was the historic Four Towns Methodist Church.

In 1866, a frame schoolhouse was built on land donated by Nathan R. Colvin at 6451 Cooley Lake Road in Waterford Township, Michigan. From that year until 1930 the building served as both a school and church. Since then the building has been used primarily for church activities.

Church services were offered once every two weeks when Four Towns had few residents. Sunday school was held weekly during the Summer months.

Today, the church is officially named Four Towns United Methodist Church.

== Schoolhouse ==
The first schoolhouse was built of logs on the town line on a portion of the land of H.L. Hunt's farm. Soon the tiny schoolhouse was outgrown and a larger schoolhouse was built in 1866 on property donated by Nathan R. Colvin. The schoolhouse still stands as a church on that location on Cooley Lake Road and Lochaven Road.

== Cemetery ==
Nathan R. Colvin gave a portion of his property for a cemetery. In 1839, the first recorded burial in the Four Towns Cemetery took place; Martha A. Coyles, age 7 months, 18 days. Four Towns Cemetery has 286 interments, as of 2016. Buried there are several early settlers and their families, including Nathan R. Colvin (1792–1873), Harley Olmstead (1803–1885) and John K. Dewey (1796–1887).
