= Robert Yerkes House =

- U.S. National Register of Historic Places
- Michigan State Historic Site
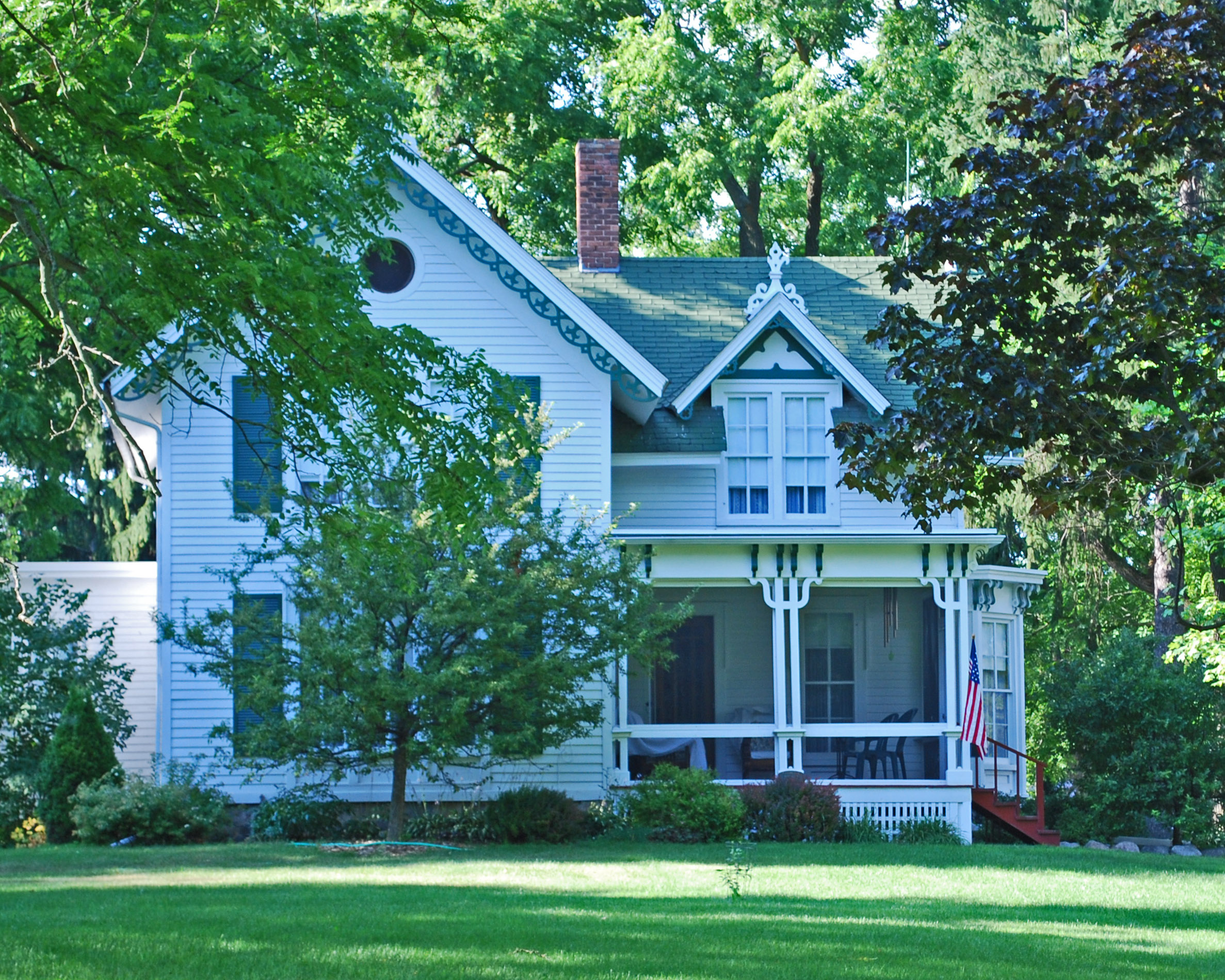
- Interactive map
- Location: 535 E. Base Line Rd., Northville, Michigan
- Coordinates: 42°26′17″N 83°28′35″W
- Area: 3 acres (1.2 ha)
- Built: 1869
- Built by: John C. Macomber
- Architectural style: Gothic Revival
- NRHP reference No.: 73000955
- Added to NRHP: November 30, 1973

The Robert Yerkes House is a single-family home located at 535 East Base Line Road in Northville, Michigan. It was listed on the National Register of Historic Places in 1973.

== History ==
William Yerkes, one of the first settlers in the Northville vicinity, arrived in the area in 1826. William's son Robert was born in 1829 and spent most of his life as a farmer. However, in the late 1860s, Yerkes decided to move to Northville so that his children could gain a better education. In 1869, he contracted with John C. Macomber to build this house. Yerkes moved into it in 1870, and lived there until his death in the 1910s. Yerkes's descendants continued to own the house until at least the 1970s.

== Description ==
The Robert Yerkes House is the best and most unmodified example of the Gothic Revival cottage architecture which was popular in the Northville area during the latter part of the 19th century. It is a two-story frame building with a one and one-half story wing, sitting on a cut granite foundation. The building is clad with clapboard, and the original windows are four-over-four units. The Gothic style is characterized by the two highly ornamented gables on the facade and the scroll saw work on the eaves and on the front porch.

== Gallery ==
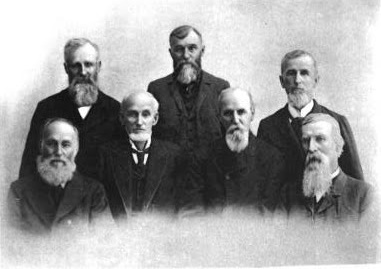
Yerkes Brothers; Robert bottom row right

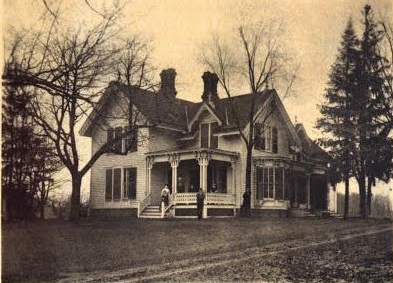
Robert Yerkes House, 1904

== See also ==
- National Register of Historic Places listings in Oakland County, Michigan
