= Four Towns Methodist Church =

- Historical Church
- Location within the state of Michigan
- Coordinates: 42°37′04″N 83°24′49″W
- Country: United States
- State: Michigan
- County: Oakland
- Township: Waterford Township

Four Towns Methodist Church is an historic church located in the unincorporated town of Four Towns, Michigan in Waterford Township, Michigan in Oakland County, Michigan.

The town received its name because it is near the point where the townships of West Bloomfield, Commerce, Waterford, and White Lake meet.

In 1866, a frame schoolhouse was built on land donated by Nathan R. Colvin at 6451 Cooley Lake Road in Waterford Township, Michigan. From that year until 1930 the building served as both a school and church. Since then the building has been used primarily for church activities.

Church services were offered once every two weeks when Four Towns had few residents. Sunday school was held weekly during the Summer months.

Today, the church is officially named Four Towns United Methodist Church.
