= Four Town Lake =

Lake in the state of Minnesota, United States

- Location within Minnesota
- Location: Itasca County, Minnesota
- Coordinates: 47°40′6″N 93°53′50″W
- Type: lake

Four Town Lake is a lake in Itasca County, in the U.S. state of Minnesota.

Four Town Lake was named from the fact parts of the lake are located in four townships.

== See also ==
- List of lakes of Minnesota
