= Sashabaw Presbyterian Church =

Historic church in Michigan, United States

- U.S. National Register of Historic Places
- Michigan State Historic Site
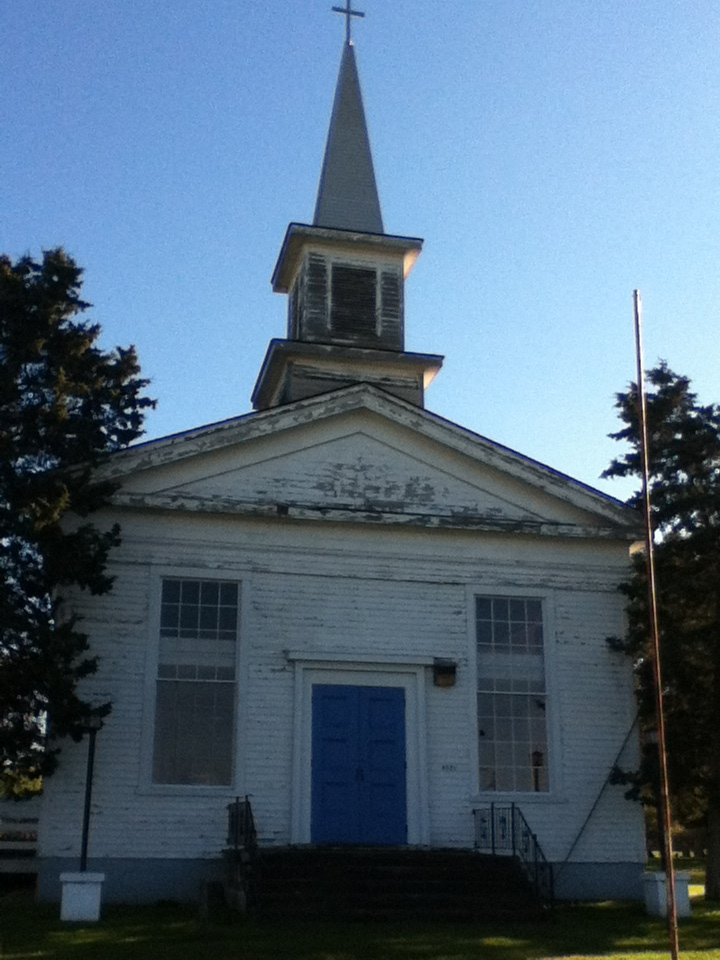

- Location within Michigan Location within the United States
- Interactive map
- Location: 5331 Maybee Road
- Nearest city: Clarkston, Michigan
- Coordinates: 42°43′9″N 83°21′44″W
- Area: 1 acre (0.40 ha)
- Built: 1856
- Built by: Pratt & Tuttle
- Architectural style: Greek Revival
- NRHP reference No.: 80001885

Significant dates
- Added to NRHP: October 9, 1980
- Designated MSHS: September 18, 1964

Sashabaw Presbyterian Church is a historic church located at 5331 Maybee Road near Clarkston, Michigan. The church is one of the oldest in the Detroit Presbytery and has served congregations for nearly 150 years. It was designated a Michigan State Historic Site in 1964 and listed on the National Register of Historic Places in 1980.

== History ==
In 1840, a local congregation was organized as a mission of the First Presbyterian Church in Pontiac. A schism soon resulted in the formation of the Church of Orion and Independence, which met in local schools. On January 20, 1855, the congregation organized a church-building society organized for the purpose of erecting a new church. The society chose Pratt & Tuttle as contractors, and the congregation changed its name to the "First Presbyterian of Independence Township." A lot for construction was purchased, and the building was completed in 1856 for a total cost (including furnishings) of $3000. In 1917–18, the church was renovated, replacing the foundation and removing the steeple.

However, the church congregation remained small, and in 1932 it was dissolved. In 1946, the Sashabaw United Presbyterian Church was organized and began using this building as its home. In 1952, the church was lifted, and a new foundation with a basement laid. In 1958, the steeple and belfry, removed in 1917–18, were replaced. In the 1960s, a new meeting house was constructed nearby for the congregation, and the congregation moved there for worship services in the 1970s.

== Today ==
The restoration of the historic 1856 church began in 2012 with a workshop on window restoration, held in conjunction with the DAR and the Clarkston Historical Society. Over the years, this building has served various community roles, including as a youth center, the original location of LightHouse North, and the staging area for the church's youth theater group.

Unfortunately, in 2017, the building began to suffer significant vandalism. In 2018, the Clarkston School District expressed interest in using the building as part of their new building and technology program and some work began in the fall of 2018. However, the COVID-19 pandemic significantly impacted this partnership, and by 2024, it became clear that the project would not be completed.

In response, the church formed a commission to determine the next steps. Sashabaw Presbyterian Church has since joined forces with the area stakes of the Church of Jesus Christ of Latter-Day Saints in a renewed effort to restore the building for the greater Clarkston community's use. This revitalized project launched on June 26, 2026, with a cleanup event that saw 87 volunteers from the two churches boarding up windows to prevent further vandalism and preparing the interior for restoration work.

Currently, the Historic Building Commission is raising funds to obtain architectural plans, a crucial step before beginning the restoration work.

If you are interested in supporting this project with your skills or by helping with fundraising efforts, please contact Sashabw Presbyterian Church (USA)

== Description ==
The Sashabaw Presbyterian Church is a small rectangular-plan Greek Revival clad in clapboard siding. It has a gable roof with flush-boarded pedimented treatment within the gable, sixteen-over-sixteen sash windows, and a small 1957 steeple. A rear addition is connected to the church.

== See also ==
- National Register of Historic Places listings in Oakland County, Michigan
