= Nardin Park United Methodist Church =

Historic church in Michigan, United States

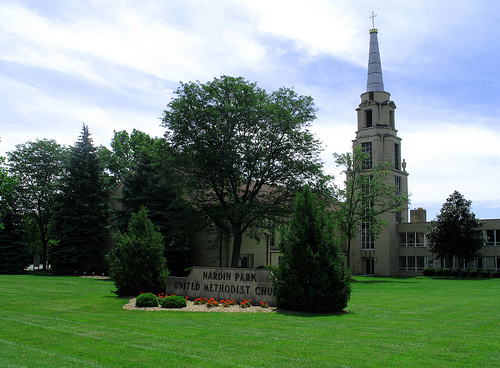
- Where Head and Heart Work Hand in Hand
- Nardin Park United Methodist Church
- 42.4843°N 83.3423°W
- Location: 29887 W. Eleven Mile Rd., Farmington Hills, Michigan
- Country: USA
- Denomination: Methodist
- Churchmanship: Evangelical
- Website: www.nardinpark.org

History
- Former name: Nardin Park Methodist Episcopal Church
- Status: Church
- Founded: 1927

Architecture
- Functional status: Active
- Architectural type: Modern
- Groundbreaking: 1963
- Completed: September 1965

Specifications
- Capacity: 3,000

Clergy
- Pastor: Pastor Monica William

Nardin Park United Methodist Church is a Methodist church situated in Farmington Hills, Michigan. Nardin Park was first formed in 1927 by the union of two large churches in northwest Detroit - the Grand River Avenue Church, established in 1891, and the Ninde Church, organized in 1886. The name 'Nardin Park' was taken from the park and the subdivision where the church was located Nardin Park United Methodist Church was officially listed in Michigan's register of historic sites on September 21, 1990.

== History ==
Nardin Park Methodist Episcopal Church was formed in 1927 by the union of two large churches in northwest Detroit - the Grand River Avenue Church (at Grand River and McGraw) and the Ninde Church (at Visger and 28th Streets). Their immediate congregation was 3,000 members. A new building was erected in 1928 at 5151 W. Chicago Avenue and the church was renamed "Nardin Park". The name was taken from the park and the subdivision where the church was located.

The decision to relocate and to build a new building was made in the early 1960s. Twenty acres were purchased in Farmington Township, with ground breaking in 1963. The Nardin Park congregation met at East Junior High School on Middlebelt Road until the new building at 29887 W. 11 Mile Road was ready in September 1965.

The former building was sold to the Ebenezer African Methodist Episcopal Church in 1963.

In 1972 a building addition provided more Sunday School rooms, a Youth room, Parlor, Choir room, an expanded Fellowship Hall and Kitchen, a Stage and a Scout Room. In 1989 another addition included an elevator, a Children's Worship Center, a Multi-Purpose Room, Chapel, Music Complex, Courtyard, Office Space, and Offices for the Samaritan Counseling Center.

== Former Senior Pastors ==
- George L. Nuckolls, 1926–1931
- Clarence E. Hoon, 1932–1934
- Marshall R. Reed, 1934–1948
- Verner S. Mumbulo, 1948–1961
- John Adams, 1961–1963
- Rev. Dr. William C. Mercer, 1963–1980
- Rev. Dr. William A. Ritter, 1980–1993
- Rev. Richard A. Peacock, 1993–1997
- Rev. Benjamin Bohnsack, 1997–2006
- Rev. Dr. Dale M. Miller, 2006–2016
- Rev. Melanie Carey 2016–2022
- Rev. Phillip Friedrick 2022-2023
- Rev. Carter Grimmett 2023-2025
- Rev. Dr. Anthony R. Hood 2025-present

== Michigan Historic Site ==
The marker reads: "NARDIN PARK UNITED METHODIST CHURCH In 1927 the Nardin Park Methodist Episcopal Church was formed by a merger of two Detroit churches: the Ninde Church, organized in 1886, and the Grand River Avenue Church, established in 1891. The following year an educational building and gymnasium were constructed on a site across West Chicago Boulevard from Nardin Park. The Depression delayed construction of the sanctuary. In 1937 a building campaign began. The Kresge Foundation donated $50,000. The completed sanctuary was dedicated in 1943. In 1963 the congregation sold the building to the Ebenezer African Methodist Episcopal Church. The present church was dedicated on October 17, 1965."
