= Caleb Everts House =

- U.S. National Register of Historic Places
- Michigan State Historic Site
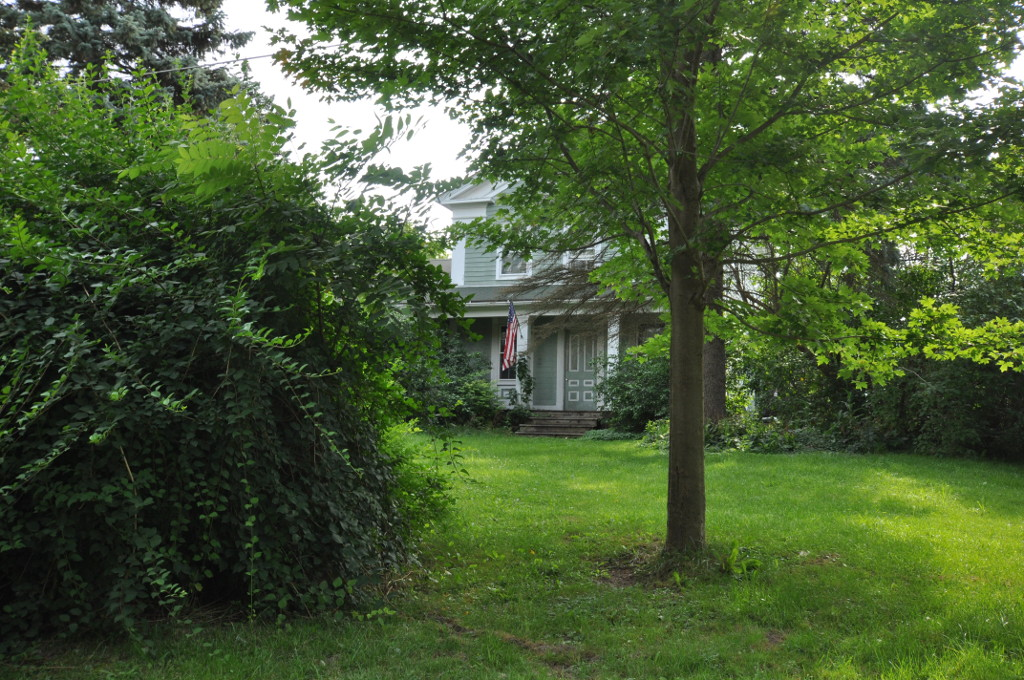
- Interactive map
- Location: 8880 Hickory Ridge Rd., Davisburg, Michigan
- Coordinates: 42.72552°N 83.6652°W
- Area: 10.1 acres (4.1 ha)
- Built: 1856
- Architectural style: Greek Revival, Greek revival vernacular
- NRHP reference No.: 80001886
- Added to NRHP: October 14, 1980

The Caleb Everts House is a single-family house located at 8880 Hickory Ridge Road in Davisburg, Michigan. It was listed on the National Register of Historic Places in 1980.

== History ==
Caleb Everts moved from New York state to Michigan in 1840, and purchased this farm. He constructed a log cabin at this site, and then in 1842 added a frame wing onto the house. Everts prospered as a farmer, and in 1856 had this house constructed. By the 1870s, he owned over 1000 surrounding acres. The property on which this house stands passed to his son, also named Caleb Everts; the younger Caleb died in 1919. The house remained in the Everts family until 1941, when it was sold.

== Description ==
The Caleb Everts House is located in a farmstead consisting of the house with a carriage shed, two barns, a granary, chicken coop, and various other outbuildings. The house is a large Greek Revival structure, covered in clapboard, with several wings. The exterior is plain, with pilaster strips on the two-story, end-gabled main block. A porch across the front is supported by square posts, as is a side porch. The original windows are six-over-six, symmetrically arranged The windows on the front porch have paneled window aprons below. A carriage shed adjoining the kitchen appears to be part of the original construction.

On the interior, the house is divided into several large rooms, with smaller ones opening off them. The floor plan is very informal, with few halls and rooms opening directly into each other.

== 1877 Gallery ==
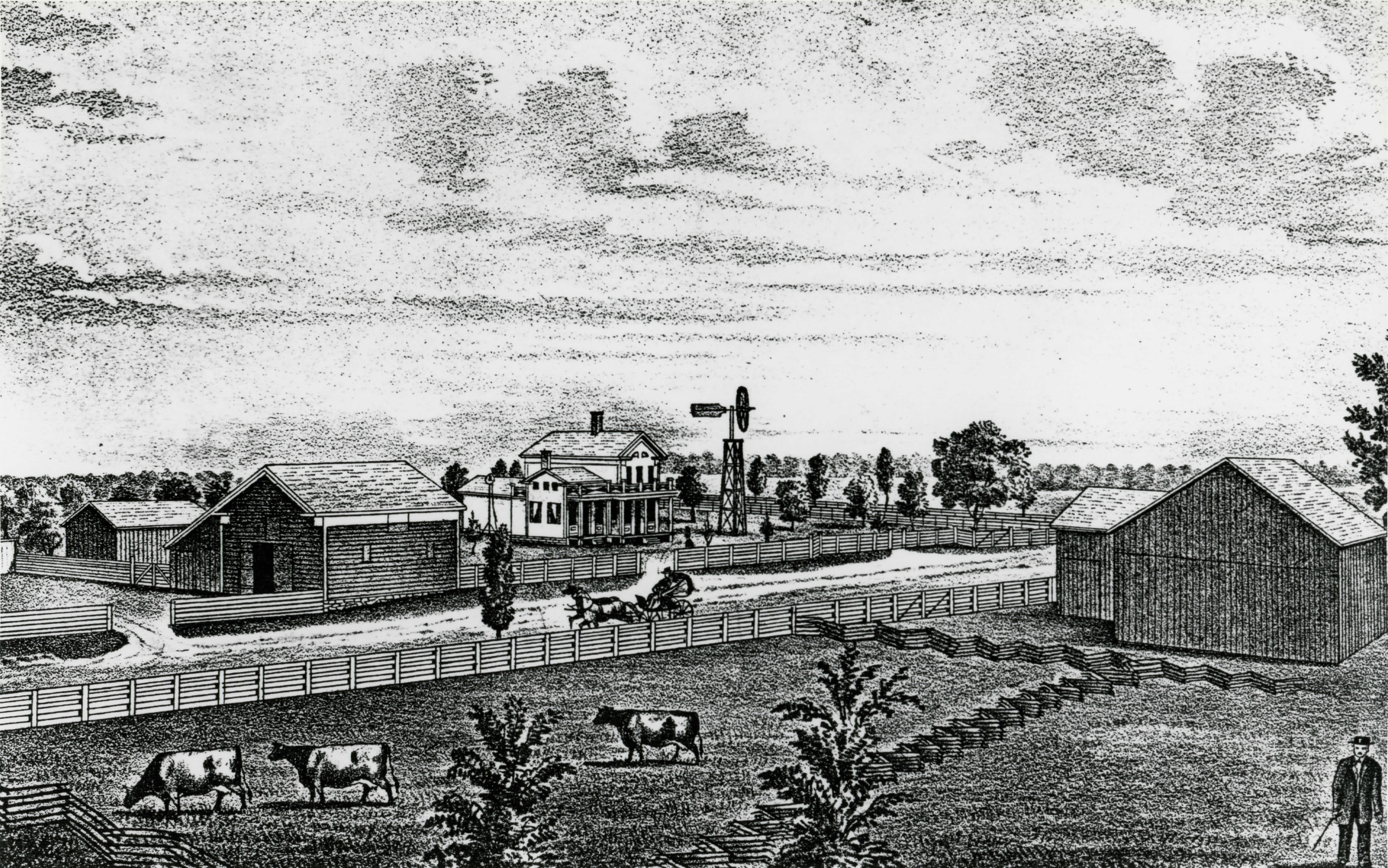
Caleb Everts House, 1877

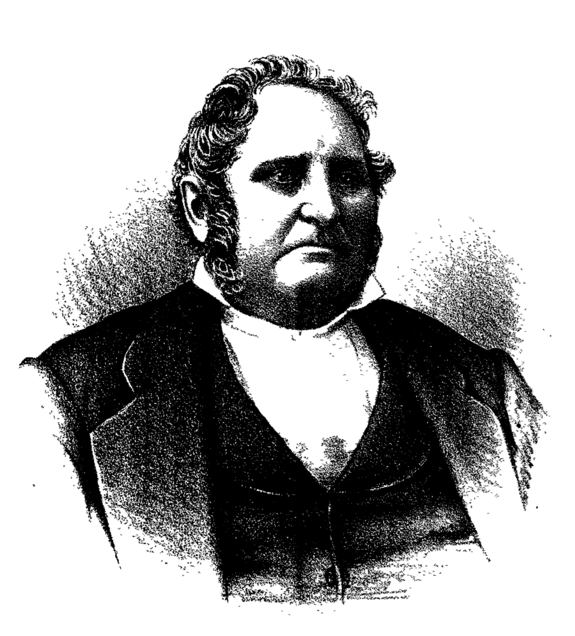
Caleb Everts, 1877

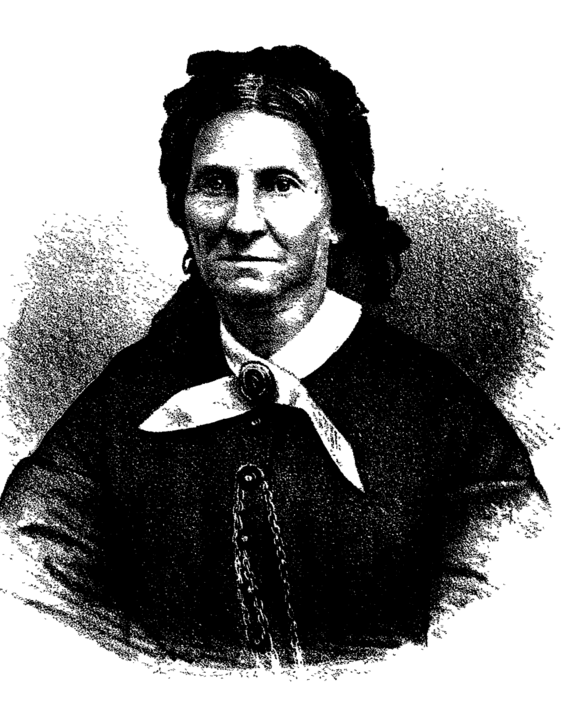
Mrs Caleb Everts, 1877

== See also ==
- National Register of Historic Places listings in Oakland County, Michigan
