= Joseph D. Yerkes House =

- U.S. National Register of Historic Places
- Michigan State Historic Site
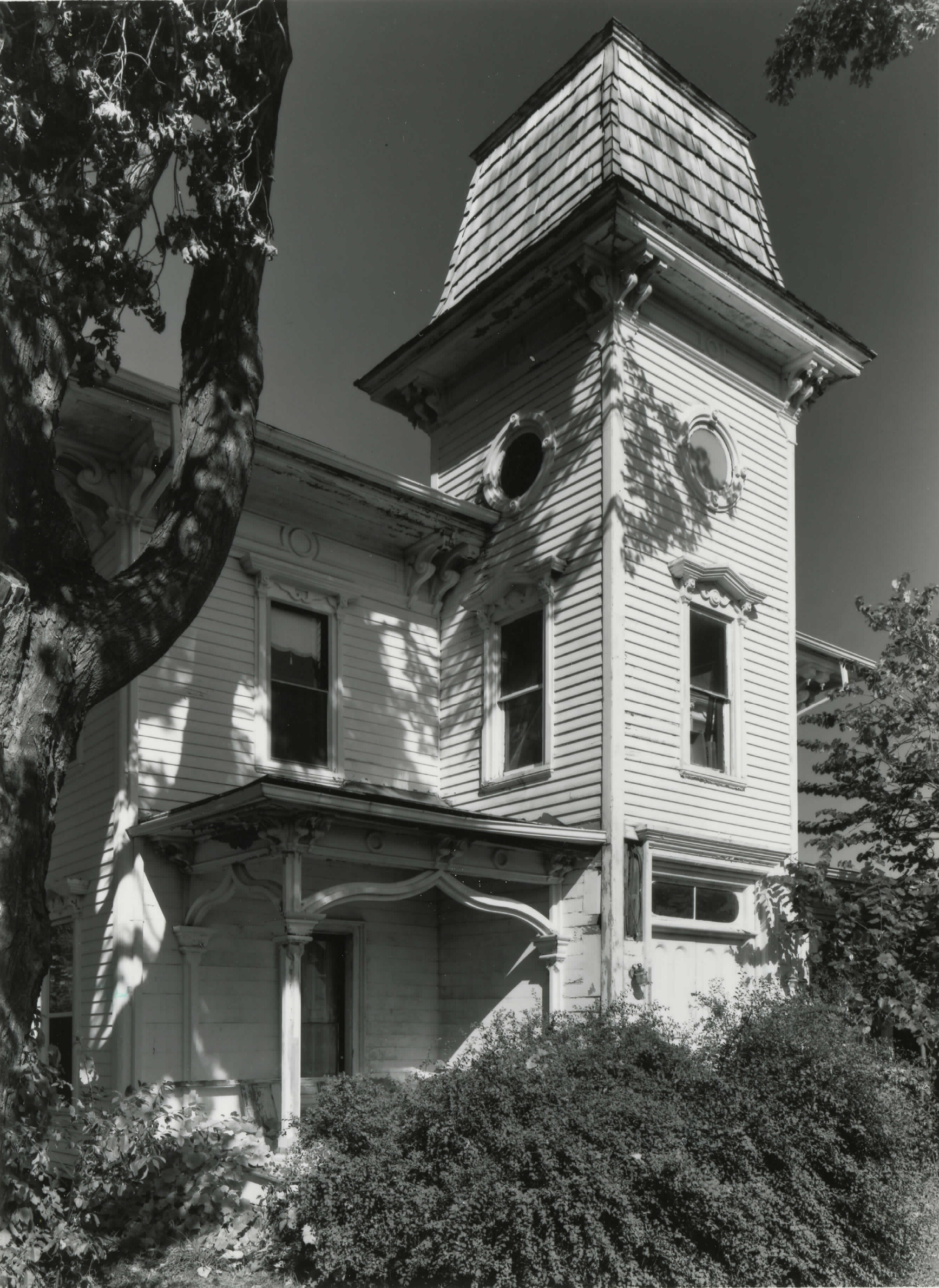
- Joseph Yerkes House, 1983
- Interactive map
- Location: 42580 Eight Mile Rd., Novi, Michigan
- Coordinates: 42°26′18″N 83°27′53″W
- Area: 1.5 acres (0.61 ha)
- Built: 1870
- Architectural style: Italianate
- Demolished: August 24, 1989
- NRHP reference No.: 84001822
- Added to NRHP: January 26, 1984

The Joseph D. Yerkes House was a single-family home located at 42580 Eight Mile Rd in Novi, Michigan. It was listed on the National Register of Historic Places in 1984, and burned in 1989.

== History ==
In 1826, Joseph Yerkes, his sons William and John, and members of their family moved from Romulus, New York to Michigan and purchased land around Novi and Northville. One of those family members was Joseph D. Yerkes, the eldest son of William Yerkes. Joseph D. Yerkes was born in New York in 1819, and helped his father farm upon coming to Michigan. In 1848, Joseph purchased 80 acres from his father at this location. Between 1870 and 1872, he had a house built for himself, his wife, and their three children.

Joseph Yerkes died in 1899. The house remained in the Yerkes family until 1959. By the late 1980s, the house had been abandoned for several years and was deteriorating. It was purchased in 1987 with the intention of preserving it; however, preservation efforts never got off the ground. The house was destroyed by fire on August 24, 1989. The "Yerkes Manor" subdivision was built on the location of the house.

== Description ==
The Joseph D. Yerkes house was a two-story, hip-roof, Italianate structure with a projecting three-story mansard-roofed tower in the center of the facade. The main section measured 34 feet by 32 feet, with a 1 1/2-story rear kitchen ell measuring 20 feet by 21 feet. The front entrance was through double doors in the base of the tower, to one side of which was a small front porch has Gothic, ogee-arch detailing. The windows in the facade were all tall, narrow, double-hung one-over-one units with projecting caps supported by small brackets. Above, the house's broadly projecting eaves were supported by paired brackets, beneath which were centrally positioned roundel decorations.

On the inside, the house had a large living room and parlor in the front of the house, separated by a rich wood archway with paneled double doors, and a dining room and library in the rear. The stairs to the second floor began in the living room and ran between the dining room and parlor.

== Gallery ==
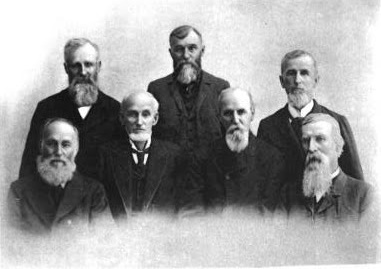
Yerkes Brothers; Joseph bottom row second from left

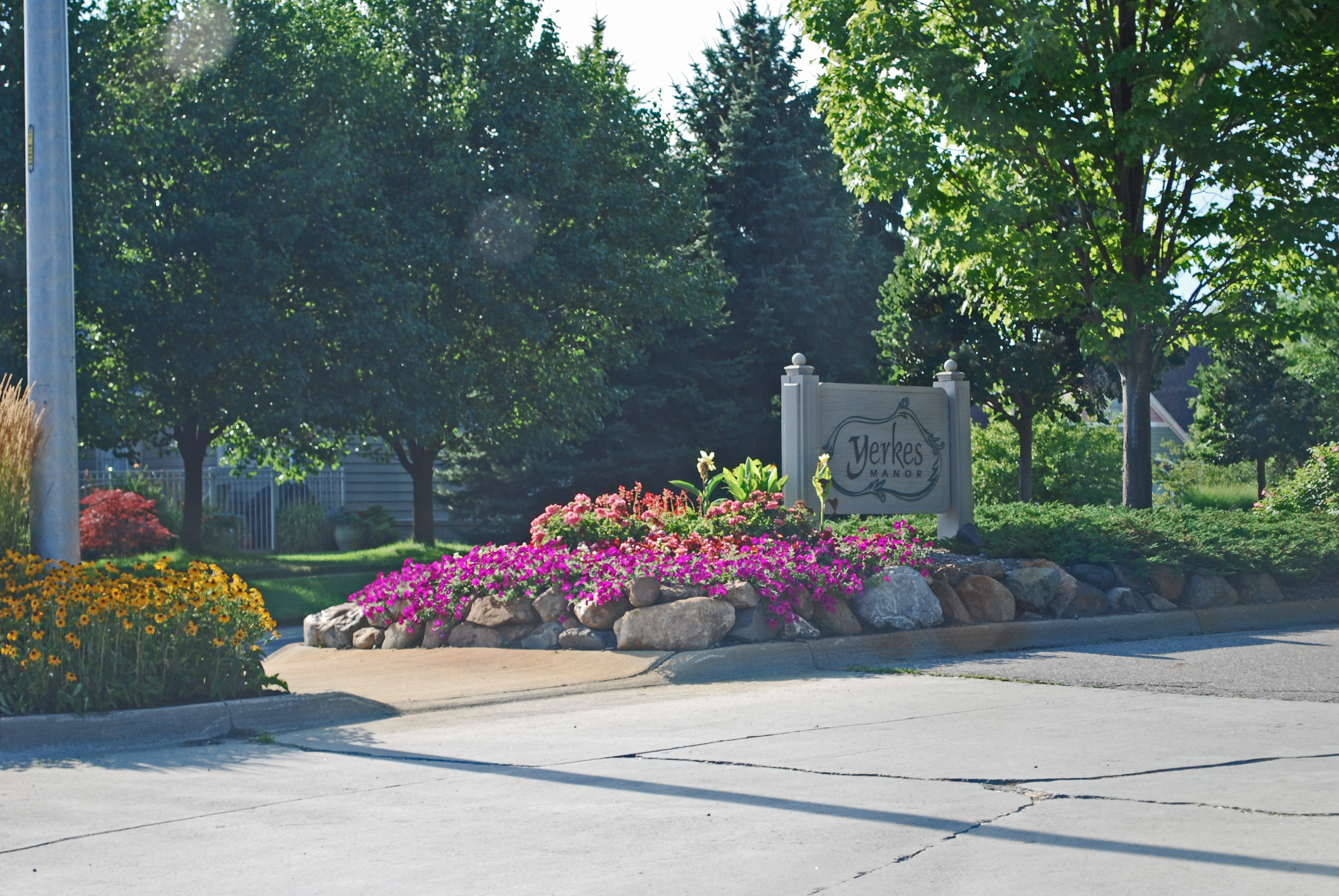
Former site of the Joseph D. Yerkes House

== See also ==
- National Register of Historic Places listings in Oakland County, Michigan
