= Highland United Methodist Church =

Historic church in Michigan, United States

- Huron Valley Council for the Arts
- U.S. National Register of Historic Places
- Michigan State Historic Site
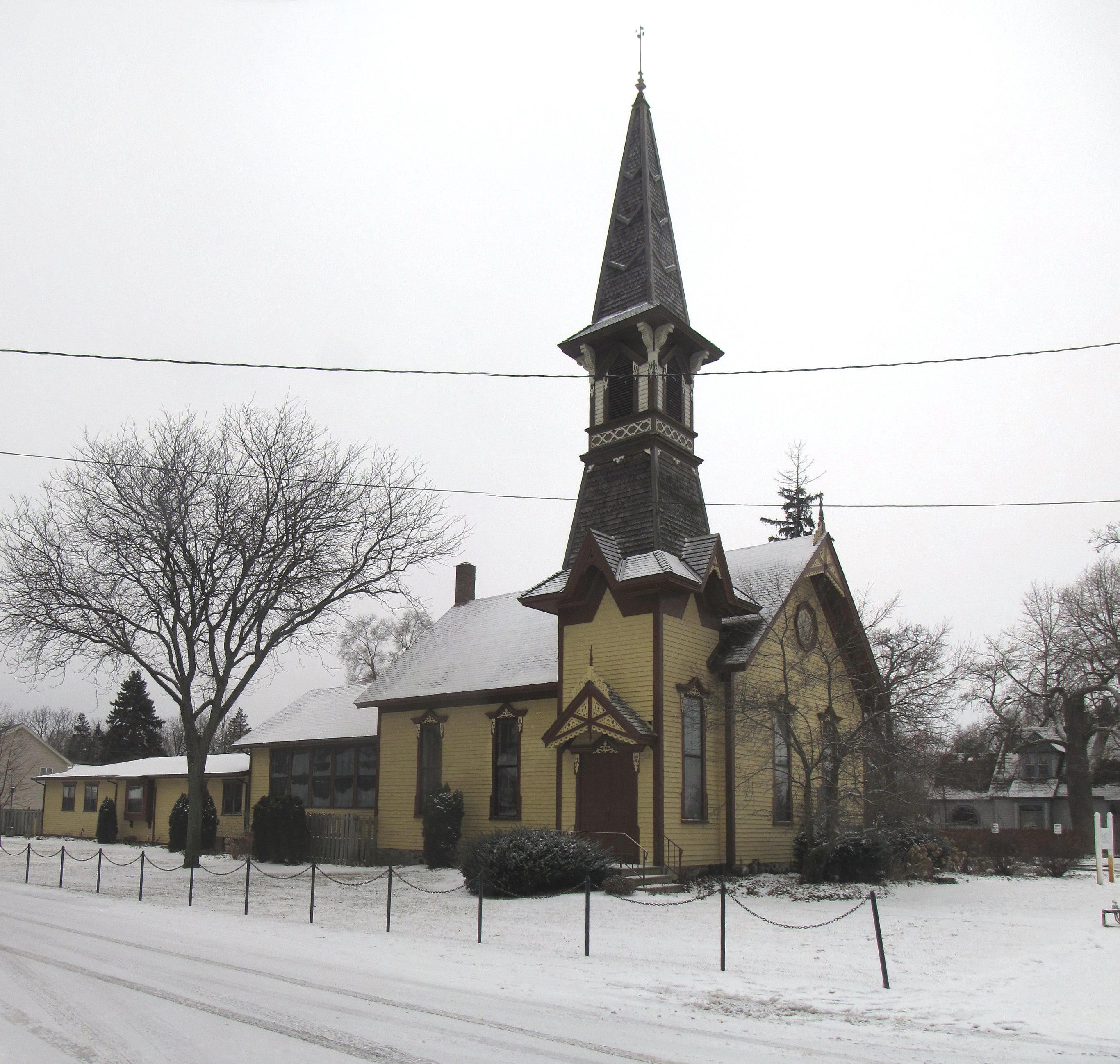

- Location within Michigan Location within the United States
- Interactive map
- Location: 205 W. Livingston Rd., Highland, Michigan
- Coordinates: 42°38′15″N 83°37′10″W
- Area: less than one acre
- Built: 1886
- Built by: Lester and George St. John
- Architectural style: Gothic
- NRHP reference No.: 81000314

Significant dates
- Added to NRHP: July 9, 1981
- Designated MSHS: March 16, 1981

The Huron Valley Council for the Arts (formerly Highland United Methodist Church) is a historic Victorian Gothic building at 205 West Livingston Road in Highland, Michigan, United States. It was designated a Michigan State Historic Site and added to the National Register of Historic Places in 1980. Highland Township purchased this building in 1981 and is now home to the Huron Valley Council for the Arts.

== History ==
The Methodist congregation in Highland was first organized in 1865, and met in the Hickory Ridge School. They continued to meet in the school house until 1886, when they had raised enough funds to build this structure. The church was built by local carpenters George and Lester St. John on three lots in Highland, donated by J. B. and Betsey Crouse, and was completed in late 1886. In 1946, the Hickory Ridge School (built in 1835) was moved to the site of the church and connected to serve as a parish hall. Another portion was added to the rear of the structure in 1957.

In 1980, the Highland Methodist Church moved down the street and the building was purchased by Highland Township, renovated and expanded, and put into use as a library in 1982. The library moved into a new building in 2002. The structure is currently known as the Highland Station House and houses the Huron Valley Council for the Arts.

== Description ==
The Huron Valley Council for the Arts, formerly the Highland United Methodist Church, is a rectangular Victorian Gothic structure with a gable roof, clapboard siding, and a projecting square tower at one corner, topped with a belfry and spire. The windows are tall and narrow, with original wooden louvered blinds on the exterior. Scrollsaw filigree decorates the window heads, the front gable, and the tower. A double-door entrance is on the base of the tower, and is sheltered by a hood.

The adjoining addition, originally the 1835 Hickory Ridge School, is a single-story, gable-roofed, wood-frame structure.

== See also ==
- National Register of Historic Places listings in Oakland County, Michigan
