= Ortonville Mill =

- U.S. National Register of Historic Places
- Michigan State Historic Site
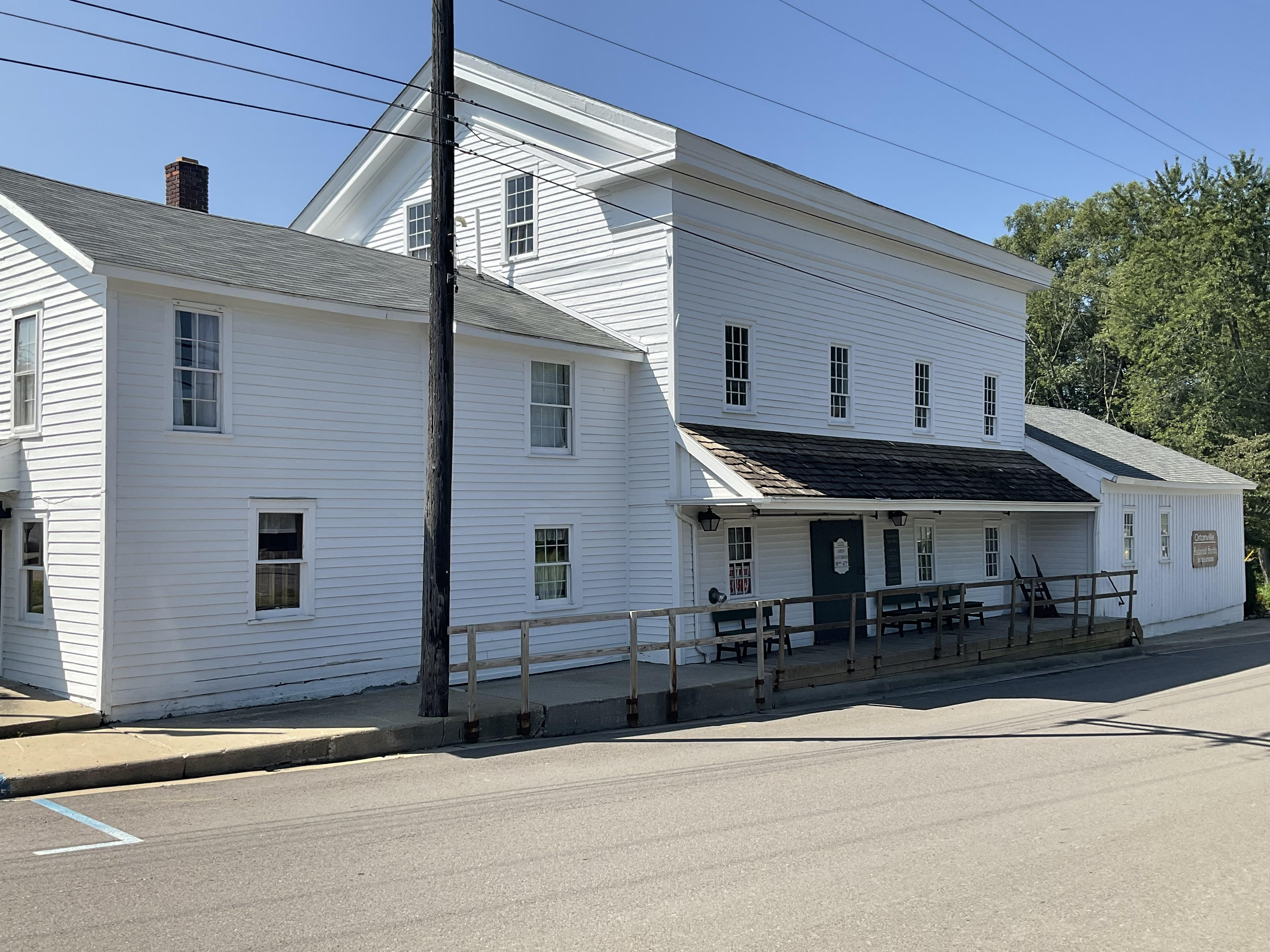
- The mill in 2023
- Interactive map
- Location: 366 Mill St., Ortonville, Michigan
- Coordinates: 42°51′07″N 83°26′45″W
- Area: less than one acre
- Built: 1856
- Architectural style: Greek Revival
- NRHP reference No.: 71000416
- Added to NRHP: April 16, 1971

The Ortonville Mill is a former gristmill located at 366 Mill Street in Ortonville, Michigan. It was listed on the National Register of Historic Places in 1971. The Ortonville Community Historical Society now operates the mill as a museum of local history.

== History ==
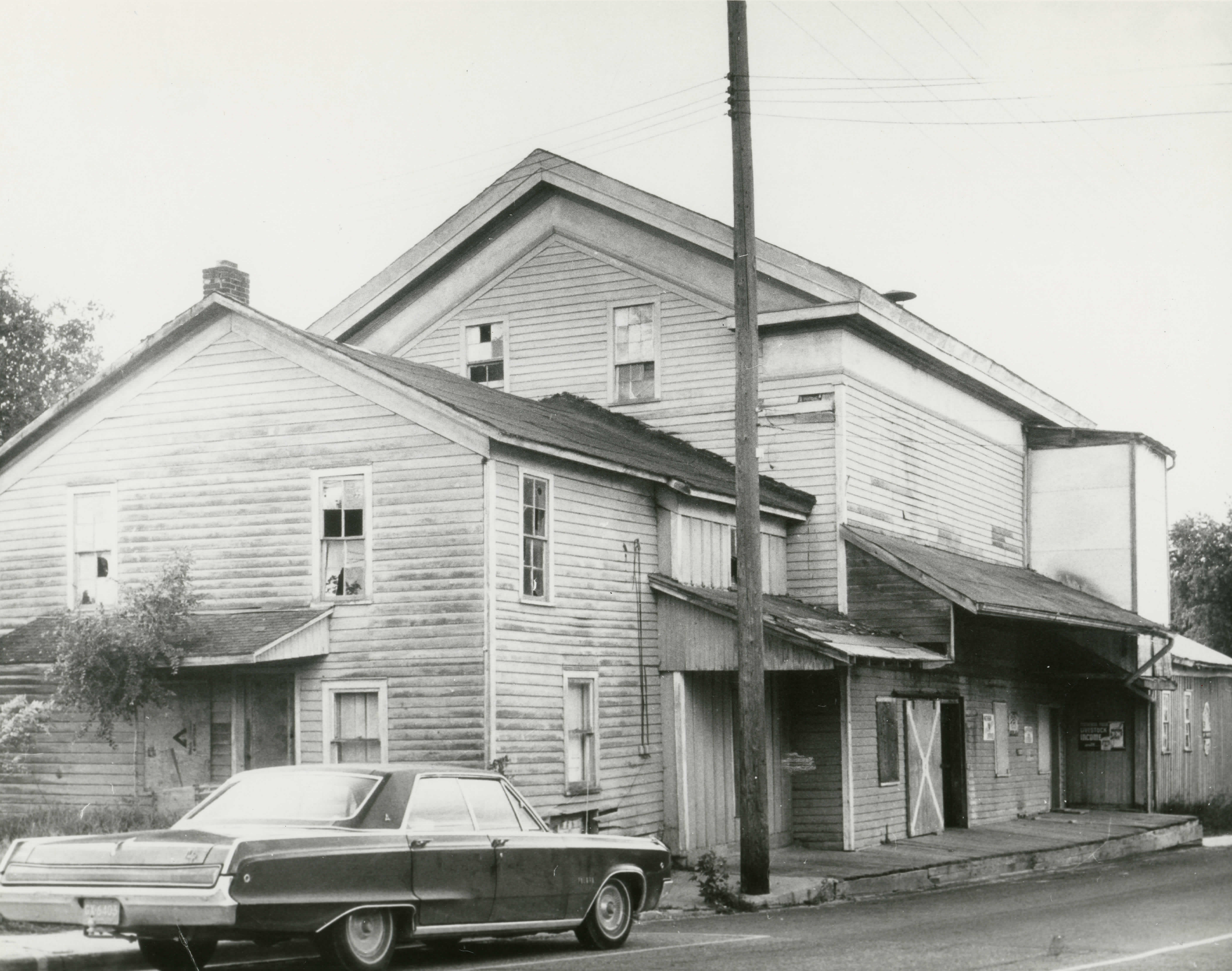
The Old Mill in 1969

Amos Orton was born in 1809 in Hadley, New York. In about 1848 he arrived in Oakland County, Michigan and constructed a sawmill very near this location. In 1852, he constructed a gristmill nearby to make the location more attractive to potential settlers. In 1856, he replaced the gristmill with the current structure. The small community of Ortonville grew up around the milling center, with Amos Orton working as the miller, blacksmith, and keeping a general store.

Orton gave up his mill in 1860, but it continued to thrive under a variety of owners well into the twentieth century. In 1889, the mill was converted to the roller process, and for a time during the 1920s also generated electric power for the community. The mill continued in use until 1960 In 1968, Emiline and Jack Hamilton donated the Mill to the Ortonville Community Historical Society for use as a museum of local history. The Society now owns and maintains the mill as a museum and gathering place.

== Description ==
The Ortonville Mill is a 2-1/2 story Greek Revival structure, made with a hand-hewn timber frame and sitting on an unpaved basement. The original section of the mill measures 36 feet by 48 feet; at some early point a large room was added on bringing the total length to 108 feet. Most of the original windows are nine over six sliding sash units. A roofed loading dock has been added to one side of the building.

== See also ==
- National Register of Historic Places listings in Oakland County, Michigan
