= Franklin Boulevard Historic District (Pontiac, Michigan) =

- U.S. National Register of Historic Places
- U.S. Historic district
- Michigan State Historic Site
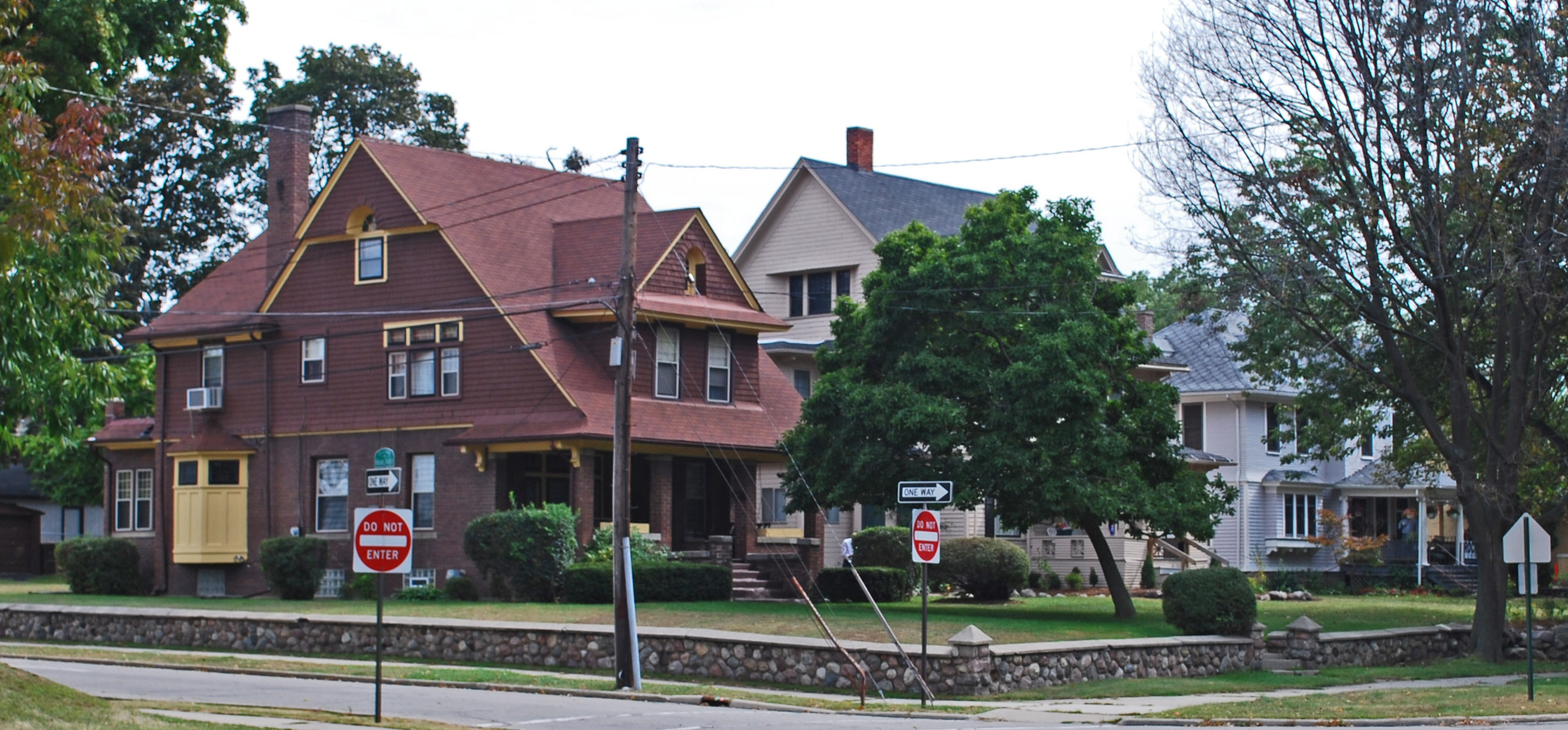
- Corner of Franklin and Pike (Charles L. Rockwell House, 65 Franklin)
- Interactive map
- Location: Roughly bounded by Grand Trunk Western RR, Orchard Lake Ave., Miller and W. Huron Sts., Pontiac, Michigan
- Coordinates: 42°38′06″N 83°18′07″W
- Area: 36 acres (15 ha)
- Built: 1848
- Architectural style: Greek Revival, Italianate, Queen Anne
- NRHP reference No.: 83000888
- Added to NRHP: August 11, 1983

The Franklin Boulevard Historic District is a primarily residential historic district located in Pontiac, Michigan along Franklin Boulevard between West Huron Street and Orchard Lake Avenue. It also contains structures along Mary Day and Henry Clay Avenues between Franklin and Miller, and some structure along West Huron between Franklin and Williams, and along West Lawrence between Williams and the railroad. The district was listed on the National Register of Historic Places in 1983.

== History ==
Pontiac was founded in 1818, with the earliest development occurring downtown. The Sibley-Hoyt House, at 146 W. Lawrence St., part of the original downtown plat, started as a company farm and frame cabin in 1819 or 1820. It is the oldest structure in the district and a cornerstone of city, county, and state historical growth and development (Sibley-Hoyt House Wikipedia). Residential development soon spread west, first to Lawrence and Williams Streets in 1835, when George M Williams platted lots in the area. In 1886, Henry Clay Ward platted Franklin Boulevard (named after his son) and Mary Day and Henry Clay Avenues (named after his wife and himself). Lots in this area were sold and developed at different times, leading to a mix of architectural styles through the district.

== Description ==
The heart of the district, along Franklin Boulevard, contains relatively large lots with large, detached, single-family houses of two-and-a-half to three stories. There is a mix of architectural styles and materials, but the streetscape is unified by a consistent 60 foot setback from the street. The houses on the adjacent Mary Day and Henry Clay Avenues are smaller in scale and on smaller lots, but are also unified by their consistent setback and similar massing.

The eastern portion of district was developed earlier, and the houses are generally older. The houses along West Huron Street and Williams Street are placed on very large lots, with substantial open space between them. The structures on West Lawrence Street are generally smaller, from one and one-half to two and one-half stories high, and on smaller lots.

Significant structures in the district include:

- Myrick-Palmer House (223 W. Huron): An Italian Villa-style house constructed by Frederick C. Myrick in 1848 and purchased by Charles H. Palmer in 1862. This house is individually listed on the national Register.
- Sibley-Hoyt House (146 W. Lawrence): A long, low clapboard-covered house is cabin dating to 1820 with another house moved to the site in 1867 by George Hoyt.a blind music teacher at the Romeo Academy when Palmer was there.
- First Church of Christ, Scientist (Williams and West Lawrence): A Greek Revival structure with a double portico facing both Williams and West Lawrence Streets. The building was originally a house belonging to Edwin C. Smith. The church [purchased it in about 1920.
- Pontiac Cultural Arts Center (47 Williams Street): This building was originally the Pontiac City Library, built in 1898 by the Ladies' Library Association. In 1924 the Association turned the library over to the City of Pontiac, and when the library moved in the 1950s, this building became the city's Art Center.
- Jacobs House (99 Franklin Boulevard): Probably the oldest building on Franklin, this house was built In 1886 by banker Frank G. Jacobs It is generally Queen Anne In style, with a large L-shaped front veranda and two small balconies on the second floor.
- McCall House (72 Franklin Boulevard): Built In 1889 by businessman F. E. McCall, this house is Queen Anne In style with a projecting angled, boxed bay at the southeast corner.
- Heltsch House (75 Mary Day Avenue): A two-and-one-half-story clapboard covered house with a steep gable roof and an enclosed porch with three pilasters across the front.
- O. J. Beaudette House (87 Franklin Boulevard): Built in 1914 by carriage-maker Oliver Joseph Beaudette. Beaudette's company was one of Pontiac's largest employers at the turn of the century, and continued to be so as the firm gradually switched to making automobile bodies.
- Leo Beaudette House (269 West Huron Street): Built in 1917 for Oliver Leo Beaudette, Oliver Joseph's son. It was designed by architect Oscar C. Gottesleben of Detroit. The Y.W.C.A. purchased the property in 1965.
- William L. Day House (22 Franklin Boulevard): Built for William La Motte Day (1863-1938), manager and president of General Motors Truck Company of Pontiac from 1912 to 1924.
- Andrew Lewis Moore House (58 Franklin Boulevard): Queen Anne house built for attorney Andrew Lewis Moore between 1899 and 1902.

== Gallery ==
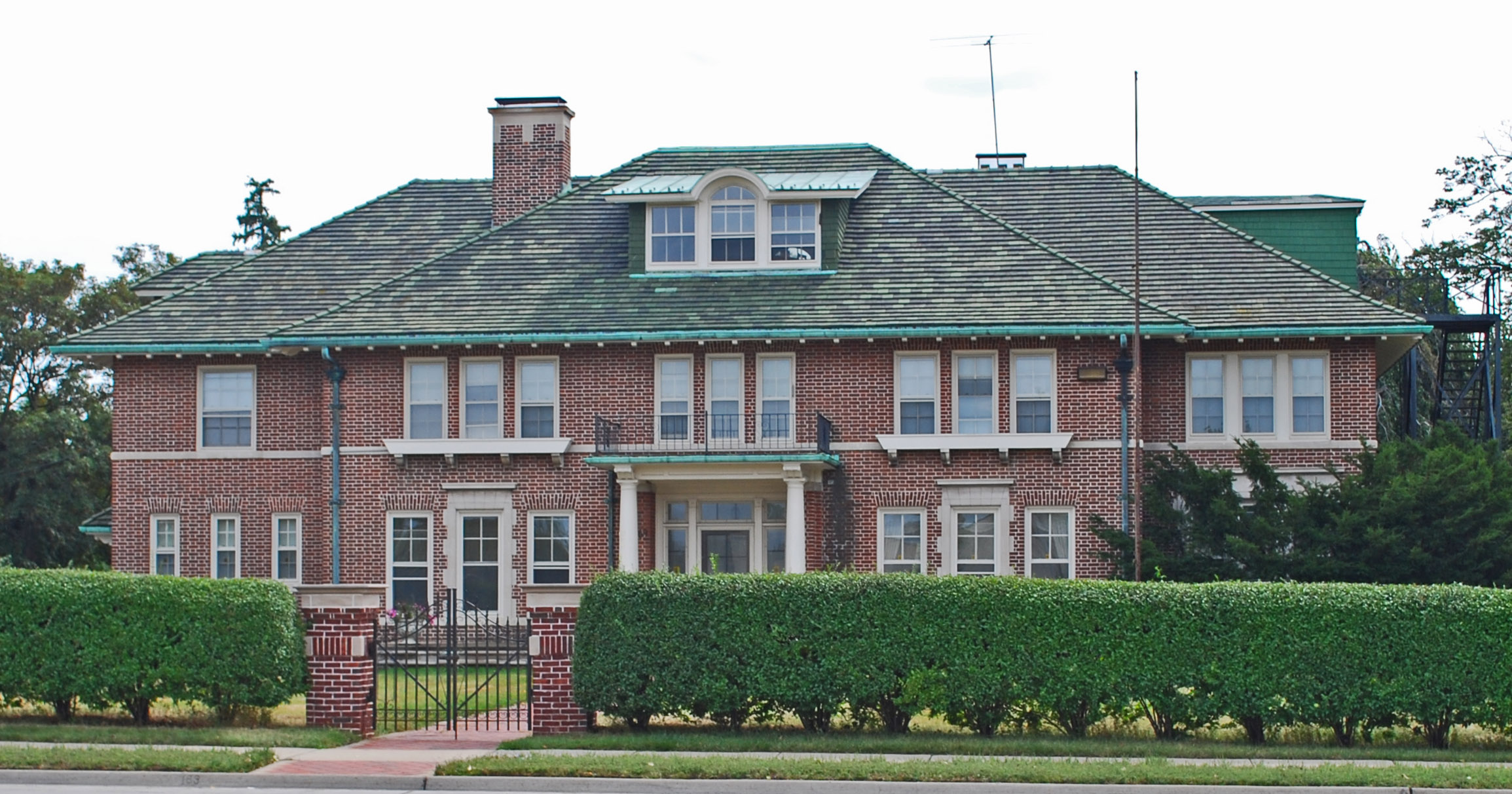
Leo Beaudette House (now YWCA), 269 W. Huron

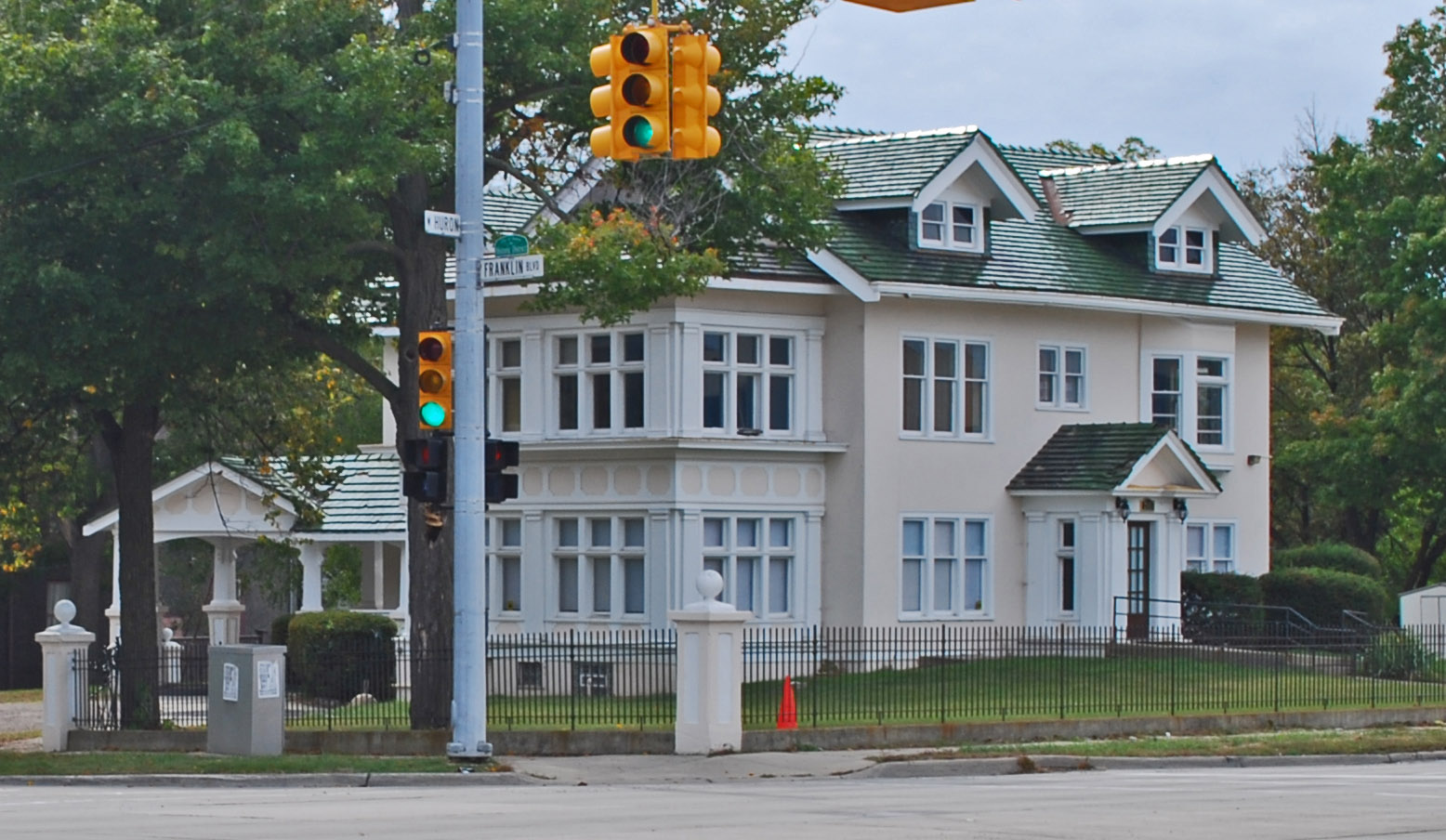
Ward House, 295 W. Huron

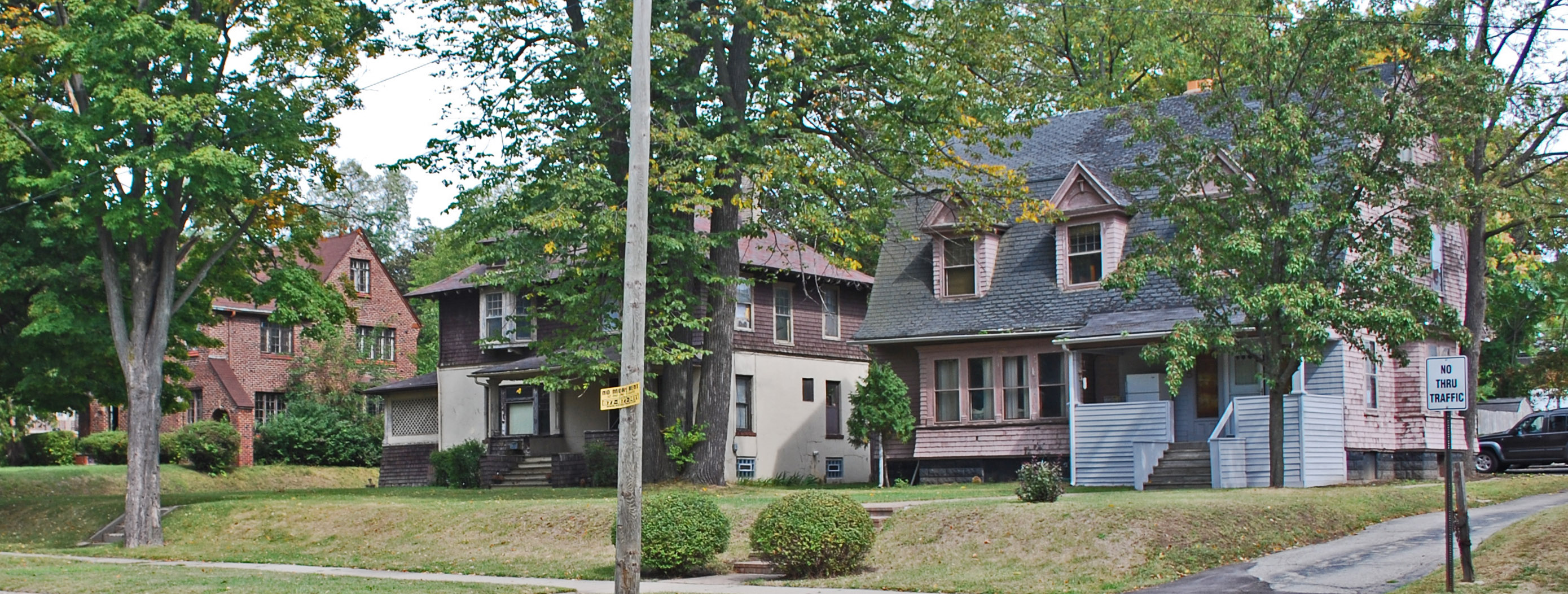
31, 39, and 45 Franklin

== See also ==
- National Register of Historic Places listings in Oakland County, Michigan
