= Myrick-Palmer House =

Historic place in Michigan, United States

- U.S. National Register of Historic Places
- Michigan State Historic Site
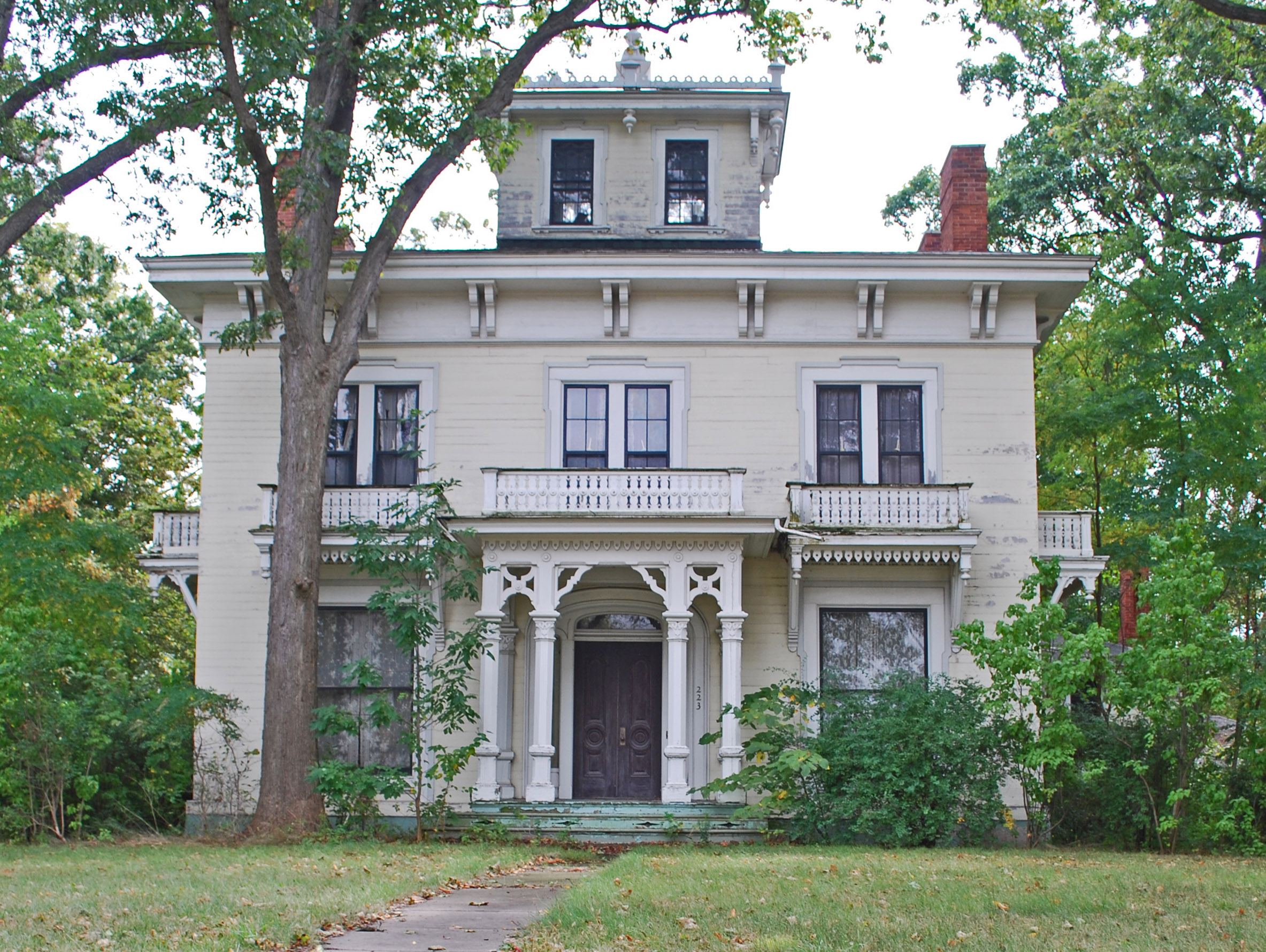
- Interactive map
- Location: 223 W. Huron St., Pontiac, Michigan
- Coordinates: 42°38′12″N 83°18′04″W
- Area: 4 acres (1.6 ha)
- Built: c. 1855
- Architectural style: Italian Villa
- NRHP reference No.: 70000283
- Added to NRHP: July 8, 1970

The Myrick-Palmer House is a single-family house located at 223 W. Huron Street in Pontiac, Michigan. It was listed on the National Register of Historic Places in 1970.

== History ==
Frederick C. Myrick moved to Pontiac some time after 1851, and the house was likely built for him in the 1850s. Myrick died in 1860, and his widow sold the house to Charles Palmer in 1862. Palmer was born in 1814 in New York state, graduated from Union College in 1837, and served as principal for various schools in the east. He moved to Michigan in 1847, working in Romeo and Flint as well as serving as a Regent of the University of Michigan. Palmer was also involved in mining, and promoted many interests in the Upper Peninsula before and after he moved to Pontiac. Palmer retired in 1875, and lived in this house until his death in 1887.

== Description ==
The Palmer House is a timber-framed, Italian Villa style two-story house on a fieldstone foundation. It is roughly cubical, with an L-shaped rear service wing. The walls are clad with flush siding, a fairly unusual feature in Michigan architecture. The house has a hip roof supported with paired brackets. Small decorative balconies are around many of the windows. A large flat-roofed cupola in the center of the roof was destroyed in a 1930 fire, and later rebuilt.

On the interior, a center entrance hall runs through the building, opening onto a parlor and two smaller rooms. Three bedrooms are on the second floor.

== See also ==
- National Register of Historic Places listings in Oakland County, Michigan
