= Milford, Michigan =

Milford
- Village
- Village of Milford
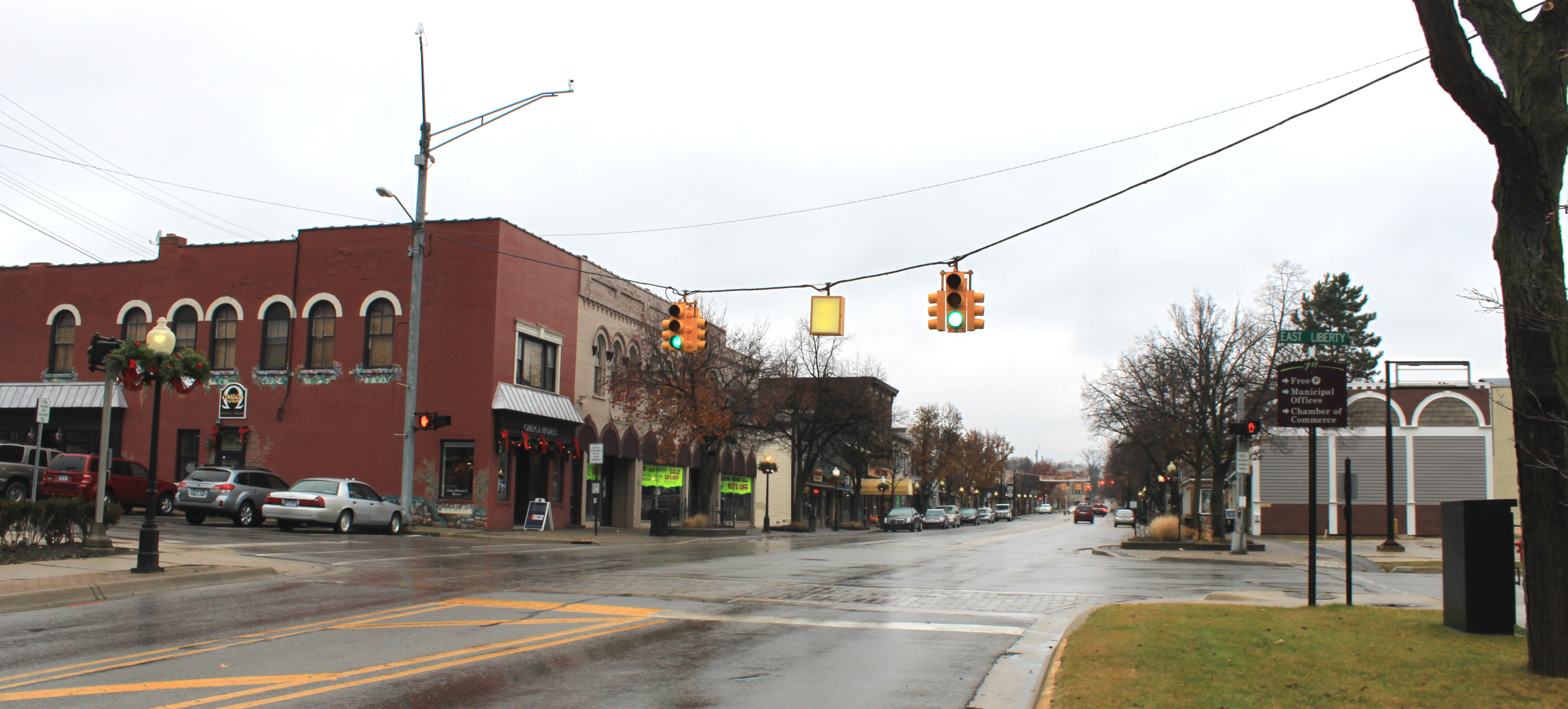
- Downtown Milford along Main Street

- Seal

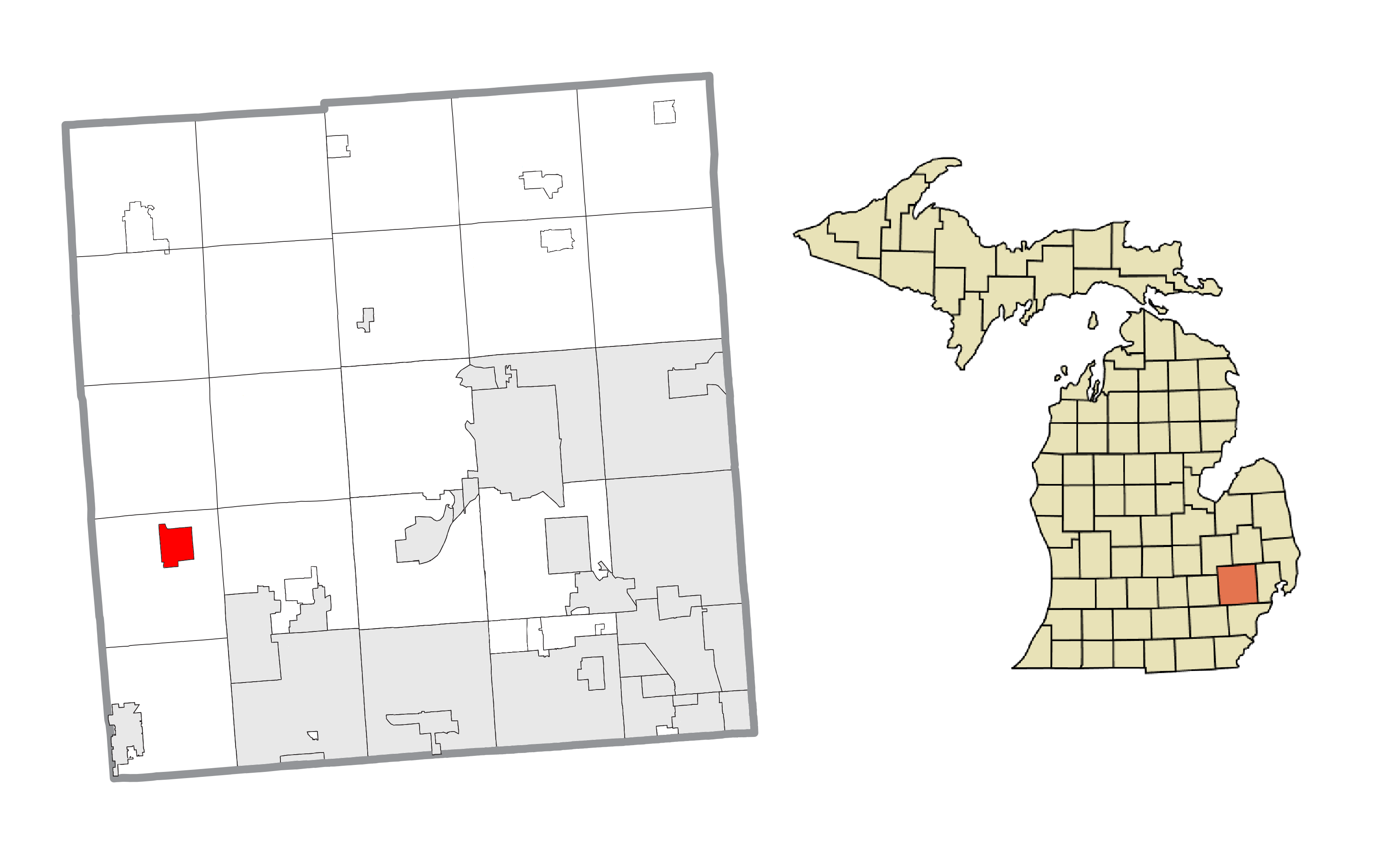
- Location within Oakland County

- Location within the state of Michigan
- Coordinates: 42°35′37″N 83°35′58″W
- Country: United States
- State: Michigan
- County: Oakland
- Township: Milford
- Incorporated: 1869

Area
  - Village: 2.53 sq mi (6.55 km^{2})
  - Land: 2.45 sq mi (6.35 km^{2})
  - Water: 0.077 sq mi (0.20 km^{2})
- Elevation: 945.00 ft (288.036 m)

Population (2020)
  - Village: 6,520
  - Density: 2,660/sq mi (1,026.9/km^{2})
  - Metro: 4,296,250 (Metro Detroit)
- Time zone: UTC-5 (EST)
  - Summer (DST): UTC-4 (EDT)
- ZIP code(s): 48380, 48381
- Area code: 248
- FIPS code: 26-53960
- GNIS feature ID: 0632306
- Website: Official website

Milford is a village in Oakland County in the U.S. state of Michigan. As of the 2020 census, Milford had a population of 6,520. The village is located within Milford Township.

The village is known for being the home of the Milford General Motors Proving Ground.

== Demographics ==
Historical population
Census	Pop.	Note	%±
1880	1,251		—
1890	1,138		−9.0%
1900	1,108		−2.6%
1910	973		−12.2%
1920	1,088		11.8%
1930	1,364		25.4%
1940	1,637		20.0%
1950	1,924		17.5%
1960	4,323		124.7%
1970	4,699		8.7%
1980	5,041		7.3%
1990	5,511		9.3%
2000	6,272		13.8%
2010	6,175		−1.5%
2020	6,520		5.6%
U.S. Decennial Census

=== 2020 census ===
As of the 2020 census, Milford had a population of 6,520. The median age was 46.3 years. 18.9% of residents were under the age of 18 and 21.1% of residents were 65 years of age or older. For every 100 females there were 88.0 males, and for every 100 females age 18 and over there were 84.5 males age 18 and over.

100.0% of residents lived in urban areas, while 0.0% lived in rural areas.

There were 2,834 households in Milford, of which 23.9% had children under the age of 18 living in them. Of all households, 48.9% were married-couple households, 15.5% were households with a male householder and no spouse or partner present, and 30.5% were households with a female householder and no spouse or partner present. About 31.2% of all households were made up of individuals and 14.8% had someone living alone who was 65 years of age or older.

There were 2,985 housing units, of which 5.1% were vacant. The homeowner vacancy rate was 0.5% and the rental vacancy rate was 8.7%.

Racial composition as of the 2020 census
Race	Number	Percent
White	5,962	91.4%
Black or African American	64	1.0%
American Indian and Alaska Native	24	0.4%
Asian	50	0.8%
Native Hawaiian and Other Pacific Islander	0	0.0%
Some other race	47	0.7%
Two or more races	373	5.7%
Hispanic or Latino (of any race)	133	2.0%

=== 2010 census ===
As of the census of 2010, there were 6,175 people, 2,589 households, and 1,719 families living in the village. The population density was 2,541.2 inhabitants per square mile (981.2/km^{2}). There were 2,777 housing units at an average density of 1,142.8 per square mile (441.2/km^{2}). The racial makeup of the village was 95.7% White, 0.6% African American, 0.6% Native American, 0.7% Asian, 0.7% from other races, and 1.7% from two or more races. Hispanic or Latino of any race were 2.0% of the population.

There were 2,589 households, of which 31.4% had children under the age of 18 living with them, 49.9% were married couples living together, 13.2% had a female householder with no husband present, 3.2% had a male householder with no wife present, and 33.6% were non-families. 28.4% of all households were made up of individuals, and 10.2% had someone living alone who was 65 years of age or older. The average household size was 2.38 and the average family size was 2.93.

The median age in the village was 40.8 years. 23.5% of residents were under the age of 18; 6.8% were between the ages of 18 and 24; 25.8% were from 25 to 44; 30.9% were from 45 to 64; and 12.9% were 65 years of age or older. The sex makeup of the village was 47.4% male and 52.6% female.

=== 2000 census ===
As of the census of 2000, there were 6,272 people, 2,427 households, and 1,706 families living in the village. The population density was 2,560.7 inhabitants per square mile (988.7/km^{2}). There were 2,491 housing units at an average density of 1,017.0 per square mile (392.7/km^{2}). The racial makeup of the village was 97.35% White, 0.16% African American, 0.38% Native American, 0.49% Asian, 0.35% from other races, and 1.26% from two or more races. Hispanic or Latino of any race were 1.32% of the population.

There were 2,427 households, out of which 38.3% had children under the age of 18 living with them, 55.0% were married couples living together, 12.7% had a female householder with no husband present, and 29.7% were non-families. 25.8% of all households were made up of individuals, and 8.9% had someone living alone who was 65 years of age or older. The average household size was 2.55 and the average family size was 3.09.

In the village, the population was spread out, with 28.6% under the age of 18, 6.4% from 18 to 24, 33.0% from 25 to 44, 21.6% from 45 to 64, and 10.4% who were 65 years of age or older. The median age was 35 years. For every 100 females, there were 91.2 males. For every 100 females age 18 and over, there were 83.9 males.

The median income for a household in the village was $59,688, and the median income for a family was $71,333. Males had a median income of $53,393 versus $31,935 for females. The per capita income for the village was $26,159. About 6.5% of families and 7.2% of the population were below the poverty line, including 13.0% of those under age 18 and 2.4% of those age 65 or over.

== History ==
The village of Milford began with the building of a sawmill by Elizur and Stanley Ruggles in 1832. Early county records indicate that the mill was erected in the "Township" at that time, and that formal organization would occur in 1834. That same year, the first gristmill was erected by Luman Fuller. In 1835, the first post office was established with Aaron Phelps as postmaster.

The Lower Mill Pond was created in 1836 to provide waterpower for the various types of mills and factories. The Upper Mill Pond followed in 1845. In 1911, the Hubbell Pond was created by a dam built on the Huron River to generate electricity. The village was incorporated in 1869.

Hydropower made it possible for Milford to become one of the first communities to have electric lights, in 1892. A year later, telephone service was available in the Village. As a point of reference, nearby South Lyon did not have electric lights until 1932.

By 1939, Henry Ford built a carburetor plant and two hydroelectric stations intended to allow residents to maintain their agricultural work while working in the factories. The former carburetor plant was demolished in 2002. The Art Deco station still remains on Pettibone Creek in the village, and restoration work began in 2004.

== Government ==
As a village, Milford is provided assessing, counties and school districts tax collecting and elections administration for county, state and national by Milford Township. The Village of Milford is a Michigan home rule village with a council-manager form of government. The village is governed by a local charter adopted by village electors. The village council appoints a Village Manager to serve as the CAO of the government, responsible for the management of the village's daily operations and oversight of all departments.

The summer of 2017 was the first year that the village has allowed golf carts on their streets. By November, only 10 carts were registered.

Milford is a part of the Huron Valley School District. All communities in far western Oakland County including Milford are presently represented in the United States House of Representatives by Tom Barrett, R-Birmingham.

== Notable people ==
- Lillian Hollister, temperance activist
- Mary Jackson, actress
- Thomas Lynch, poet
- Blake Pietila, hockey player
- Richard Pursel, animation writer
- Dax Shepard, actor
- Brian Steele, actor
- Jim Storm, hockey player
- Matt Wayne, animation writer
- Violent J, rapper

== Geography ==
According to the United States Census Bureau in 2010, the village has a total area of 2.52 square miles (6.53 km^{2}), of which 2.43 square miles (6.29 km^{2}) is land and 0.09 square miles (0.23 km^{2}) is water.

== Climate ==
This climatic region is typified by large seasonal temperature differences, with warm to hot (and often humid) summers and cold (sometimes severely cold) winters. According to the Köppen Climate Classification system, Milford has a humid continental climate, abbreviated "Dfb" on climate maps.

Climate data for Milford, Michigan (Milford GM Proving Ground) 1991–2020 normals, extremes 1928–present
Month	Jan	Feb	Mar	Apr	May	Jun	Jul	Aug	Sep	Oct	Nov	Dec	Year
Record high °F (°C)	66 (19)	67 (19)	84 (29)	86 (30)	93 (34)	102 (39)	104 (40)	99 (37)	97 (36)	88 (31)	78 (26)	67 (19)	104 (40)
Mean daily maximum °F (°C)	30.9 (−0.6)	34.0 (1.1)	44.7 (7.1)	57.6 (14.2)	69.6 (20.9)	78.4 (25.8)	82.3 (27.9)	80.1 (26.7)	73.5 (23.1)	60.7 (15.9)	47.2 (8.4)	35.5 (1.9)	57.9 (14.4)
Daily mean °F (°C)	22.8 (−5.1)	24.5 (−4.2)	34.2 (1.2)	46.3 (7.9)	57.8 (14.3)	67.1 (19.5)	71.0 (21.7)	69.3 (20.7)	62.2 (16.8)	50.4 (10.2)	38.3 (3.5)	28.1 (−2.2)	47.7 (8.7)
Mean daily minimum °F (°C)	14.7 (−9.6)	15.1 (−9.4)	23.7 (−4.6)	34.9 (1.6)	46.0 (7.8)	55.8 (13.2)	59.6 (15.3)	58.4 (14.7)	51.0 (10.6)	40.0 (4.4)	29.5 (−1.4)	20.8 (−6.2)	37.5 (3.1)
Record low °F (°C)	−23 (−31)	−27 (−33)	−14 (−26)	11 (−12)	21 (−6)	33 (1)	39 (4)	38 (3)	26 (−3)	16 (−9)	−2 (−19)	−18 (−28)	−27 (−33)
Average precipitation inches (mm)	2.06 (52)	1.91 (49)	2.16 (55)	3.07 (78)	3.66 (93)	3.58 (91)	3.20 (81)	3.32 (84)	3.51 (89)	2.88 (73)	2.64 (67)	2.10 (53)	34.09 (866)
Source: NOAA
