= Metro Detroit =

Metropolitan area in Michigan, US

Coordinates: 42°26′48″N 83°07′30″W

- Combined Statistical Area
- Detroit–Warren–Dearborn, MI; Metropolitan Statistical Area
- Downtown Detroit seen from Windsor, Ontario in August 2026
- Nickname(s): Motor City, Motown, Hockeytown, The Arsenal of Democracy
Interactive Map of Detroit–Warren–Ann Arbor, MI CSA
City of Detroit
Detroit–Warren–Dearborn, MI MSA
Detroit–Dearborn–Livonia Met Division
Warren–Troy–Farmington Hills, MI
Other Statistical Areas in the Detroit CSA
Flint, MI MSA
Ann Arbor, MI MSA
Monroe, MI MSA
Adrian, MI µSA
- Country: United States
- State: Michigan
- Principal city: Detroit
- Counties: List: In MSA: Lapeer; Livingston; Macomb; Oakland; St. Clair; Wayne; Additional in CSA: Genesee; Lenawee; Monroe; Washtenaw

Area
  - Urban: 1,284.8 sq mi (3,328 km^{2})
  - MSA: 3,888.4 sq mi (10,071 km^{2})
  - CSA: 6,701 sq mi (17,360 km^{2})
- Elevation: 569–1,280 ft (173–390 m)

Population (2020)
  - Urban: 3,776,890 (12th)
  - Urban density: 2,939.6/sq mi (1,135.0/km^{2})
  - MSA: 4,392,041 (14th)
  - CSA: 5,325,219 (12th)

GDP
  - MSA: $331.333 billion (2023)
  - Per capita: $75,439 (2023)
- Time zone: UTC−5 (EST)
  - Summer (DST): UTC−4 (EDT)
- Area codes: 248, 313, 586, 734, 810, 947
- Website: visitdetroit.com

Metro Detroit is a major metropolitan area in the U.S. state of Michigan, consisting of the city of Detroit and over 200 municipalities in the surrounding area. There are varied definitions of the area, including the official statistical areas designated by the Office of Management and Budget, a federal agency of the United States.

Metro Detroit is known for its automotive heritage, arts, entertainment, popular music, food, cultural diversity, and sports. The area includes a variety of natural landscapes, parks, and beaches, with a recreational coastline linking the Great Lakes. Metro Detroit also has one of the largest metropolitan economies in the U.S. with 17 Fortune 500 companies.

== Definitions ==
Detroit in 1940 (8:50)
1940 color 8mm footage of Metro Detroit.

The Detroit Urban Area, which serves as the metropolitan area's core, ranks as the 12th most populous in the United States, with a population of 3,776,890 as of the 2020 census and an area of 1,284.83 square miles (3,327.7 km^{2}). This urbanized area covers parts of the counties of Macomb, Oakland, and Wayne. These counties are sometimes referred to as the Detroit Tri-County Area and had a population of 3,862,888 as of the 2010 census with an area of 1,967.1 square miles (5,095 km^{2}).

The Office of Management and Budget (OMB), a federal agency of the United States, defines the Detroit–Warren–Dearborn Metropolitan Statistical Area (MSA) as the six counties of Lapeer, Livingston, Macomb, Oakland, St. Clair, and Wayne. As of the 2010 census, the MSA had a population of 4,296,250 with an area of 3,913 square miles (10,130 km^{2}).

=== Detroit–Warren–Dearborn Metropolitan Statistical Area ===
County	Seat	2025 Estimate	2020 Census	Change	Area	Density
Wayne	Detroit	1,769,038	1,793,561	−1.37%	612.08 sq mi (1,585.3 km^{2})	2,890/sq mi (1,116/km^{2})
Oakland	Pontiac	1,288,337	1,274,395	+1.09%	867.66 sq mi (2,247.2 km^{2})	1,485/sq mi (573/km^{2})
Macomb	Mt. Clemens	886,221	881,287	+0.56%	479.22 sq mi (1,241.2 km^{2})	1,849/sq mi (714/km^{2})
Livingston	Howell	197,315	193,866	+1.78%	565.25 sq mi (1,464.0 km^{2})	349/sq mi (135/km^{2})
St. Clair	Port Huron	160,486	160,383	+0.06%	721.17 sq mi (1,867.8 km^{2})	223/sq mi (86/km^{2})
Lapeer	Lapeer	89,516	88,619	+1.01%	643.01 sq mi (1,665.4 km^{2})	139/sq mi (54/km^{2})
Total		4,390,913	4,392,041	−0.03%	3,888.39 sq mi (10,070.9 km^{2})	1,129/sq mi (436/km^{2})

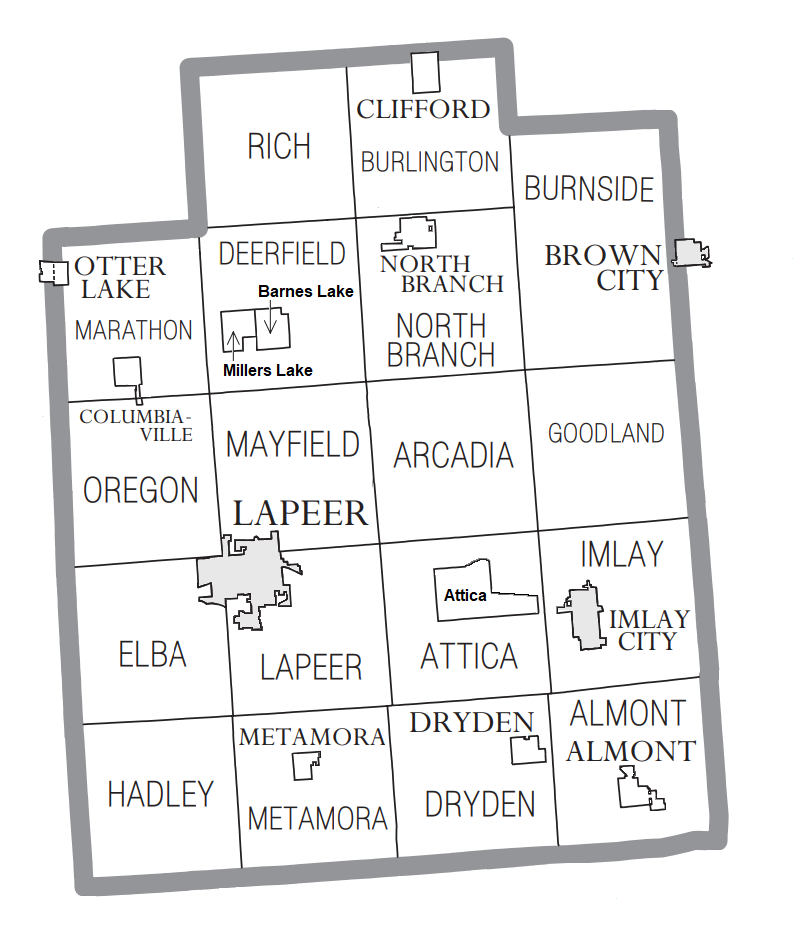
Lapeer County

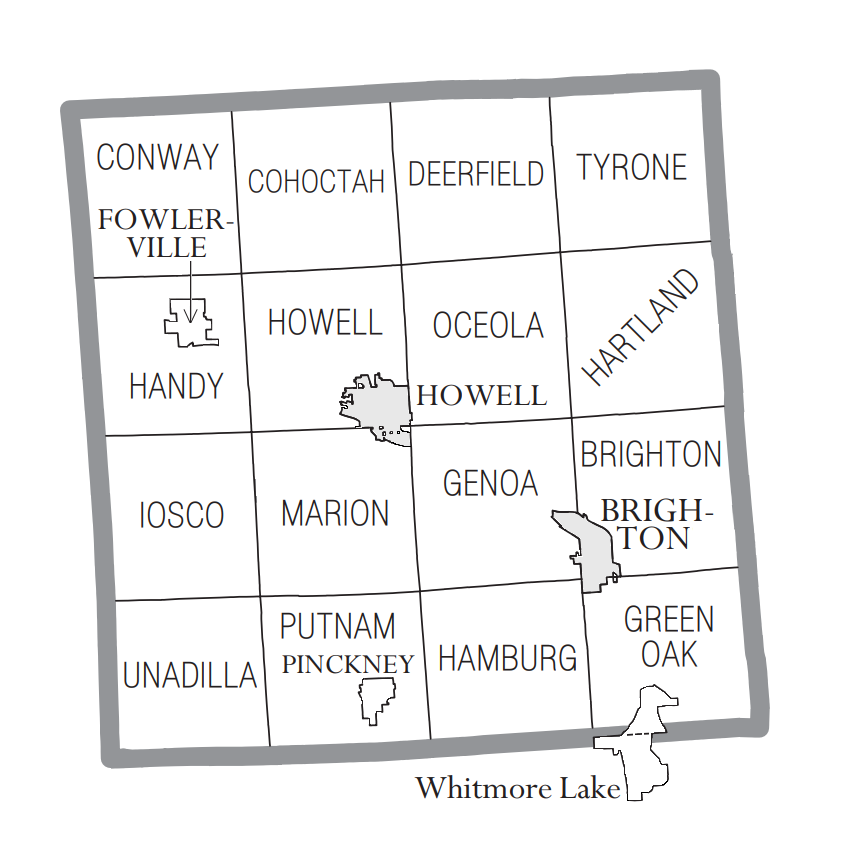
Livingston County

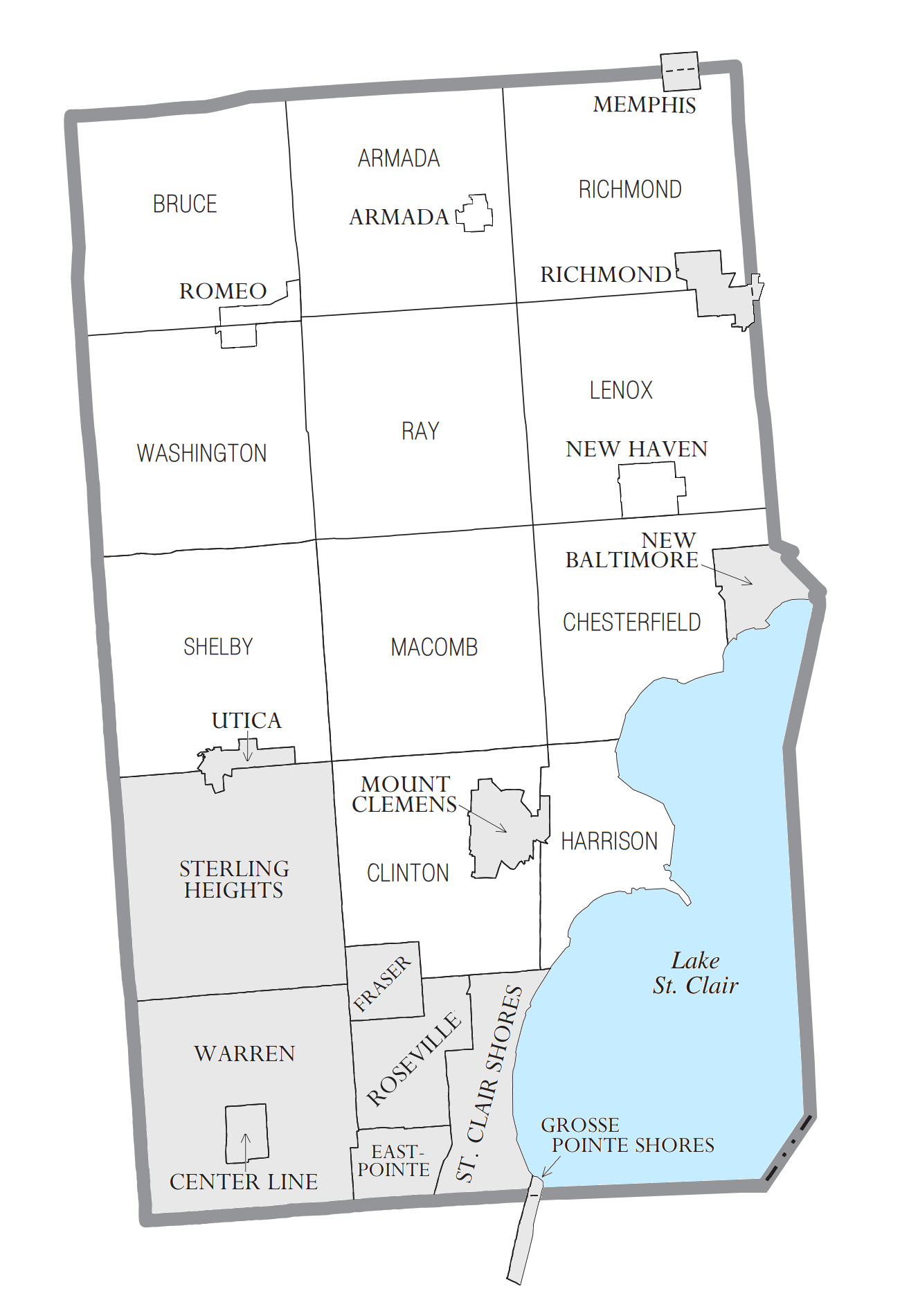
Macomb County

Oakland County

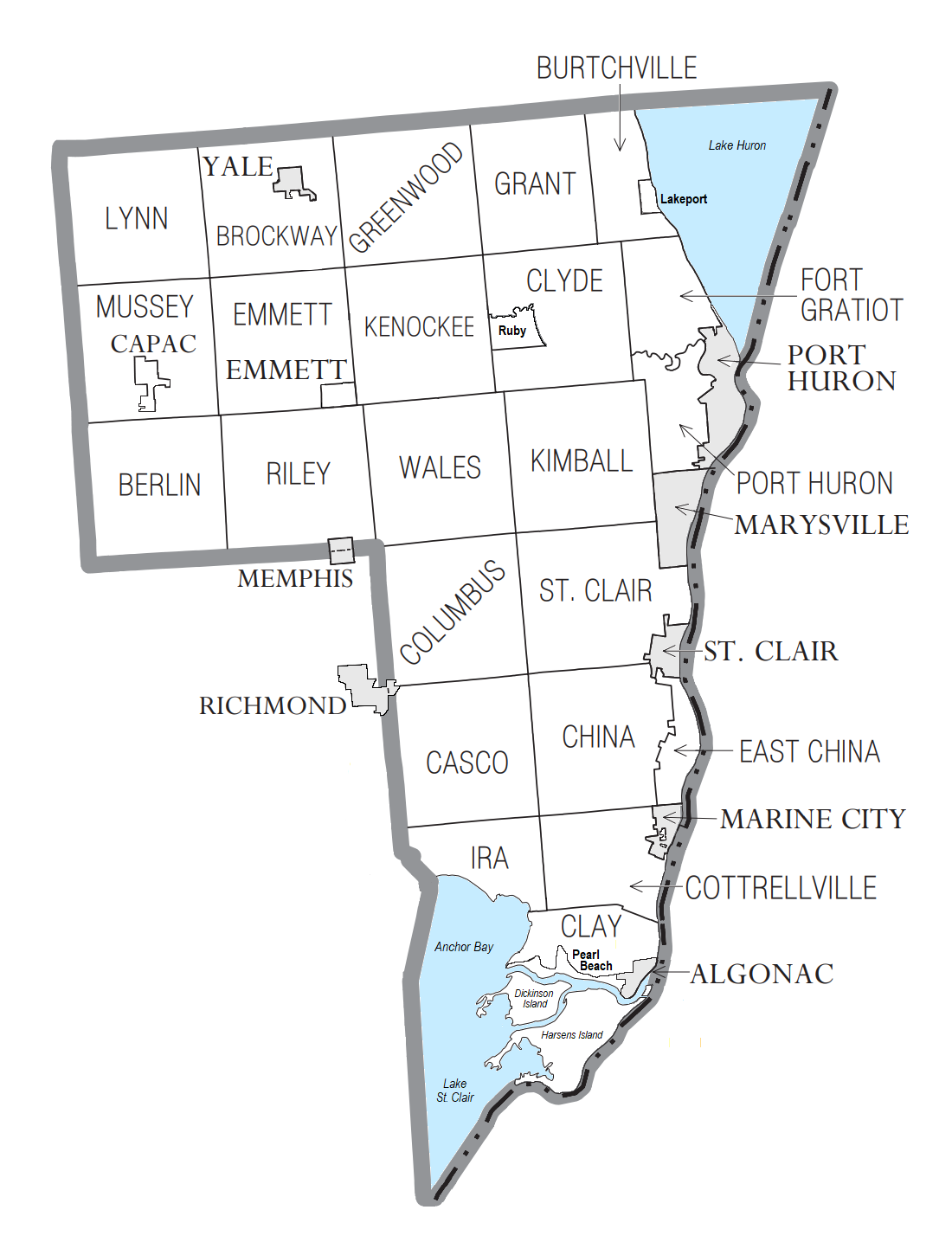
St. Clair County

Wayne County

The nine county area designated by the OMB as the Detroit–Warren–Ann Arbor Combined Statistical Area (CSA) includes the Detroit–Warren–Dearborn MSA and the three additional counties of Genesee, Monroe, and Washtenaw (which include the metropolitan areas of Flint, Monroe, and Ann Arbor, respectively). It had a population of 5,318,744 as of the 2010 census, making it one of the largest metropolitan areas in the United States, covering an area of 5,814 square miles (15,060 km^{2}). Lenawee County was removed from the CSA in 2000, but added back in 2013.

=== Detroit–Warren–Ann Arbor Combined Statistical Area ===
Statistical Area	2025 Estimate	2020 Census	Change	Area	Density
Detroit-Warren-Dearborn, MI Metropolitan Statistical Area	4,390,913	4,392,041	−0.03%	3,888 sq mi (10,070 km^{2})	1,129/sq mi (436/km^{2})
Flint, MI Metropolitan Statistical Area (Genesee County)	401,093	406,211	−1.26%	650 sq mi (1,700 km^{2})	617/sq mi (238/km^{2})
Ann Arbor, MI Metropolitan Statistical Area (Washtenaw County)	370,214	372,258	−0.55%	722 sq mi (1,870 km^{2})	513/sq mi (198/km^{2})
Monroe, MI Metropolitan Statistical Area (Monroe County)	156,004	154,809	+0.77%	722 sq mi (1,870 km^{2})	216/sq mi (83/km^{2})
Adrian, MI Micropolitan Statistical Area (Lenawee County)	97,779	99,423	−1.65%	761 sq mi (1,970 km^{2})	128/sq mi (50/km^{2})
Total	5,416,003	5,424,742	−0.16%	6,701 sq mi (17,360 km^{2})	808/sq mi (312/km^{2})

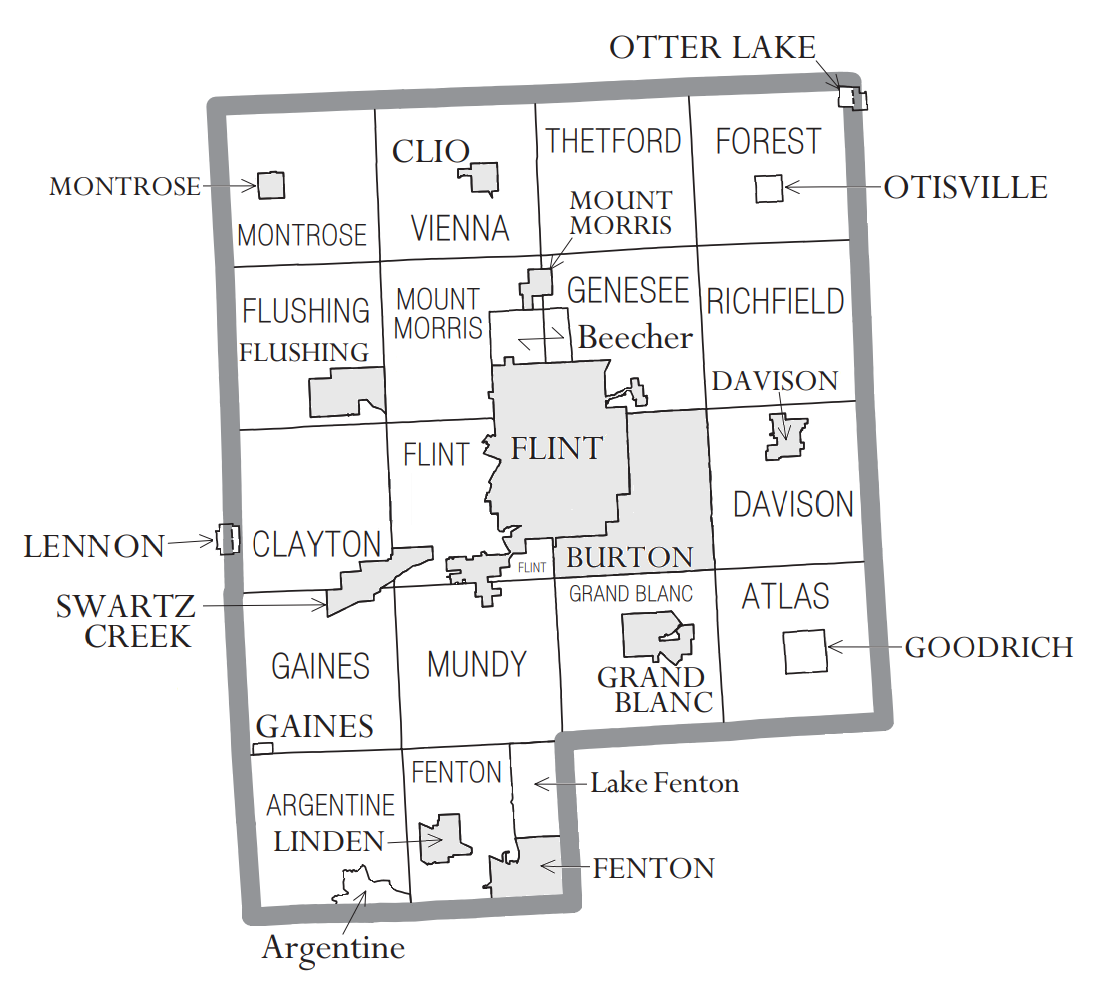
Genesee County

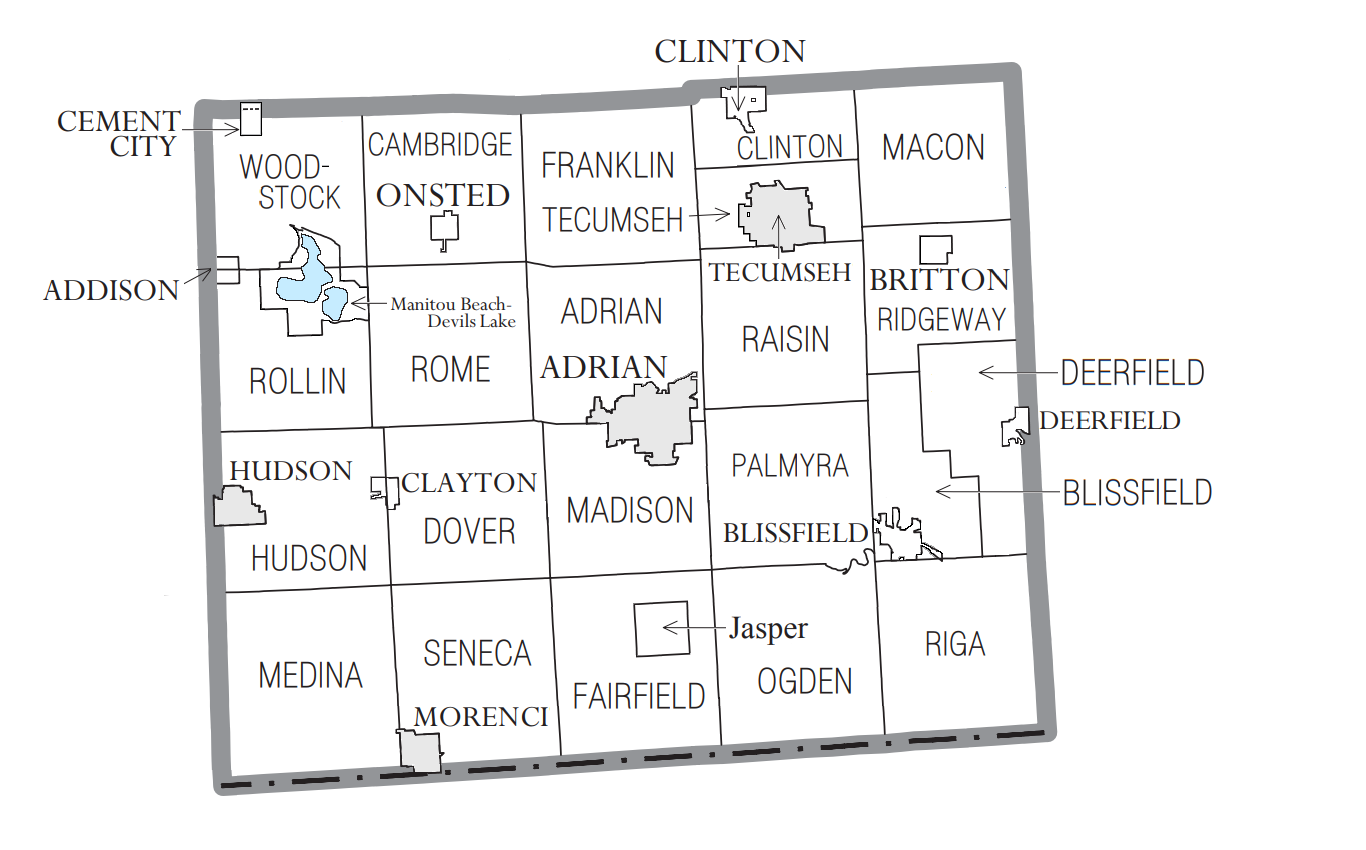
Lenawee County

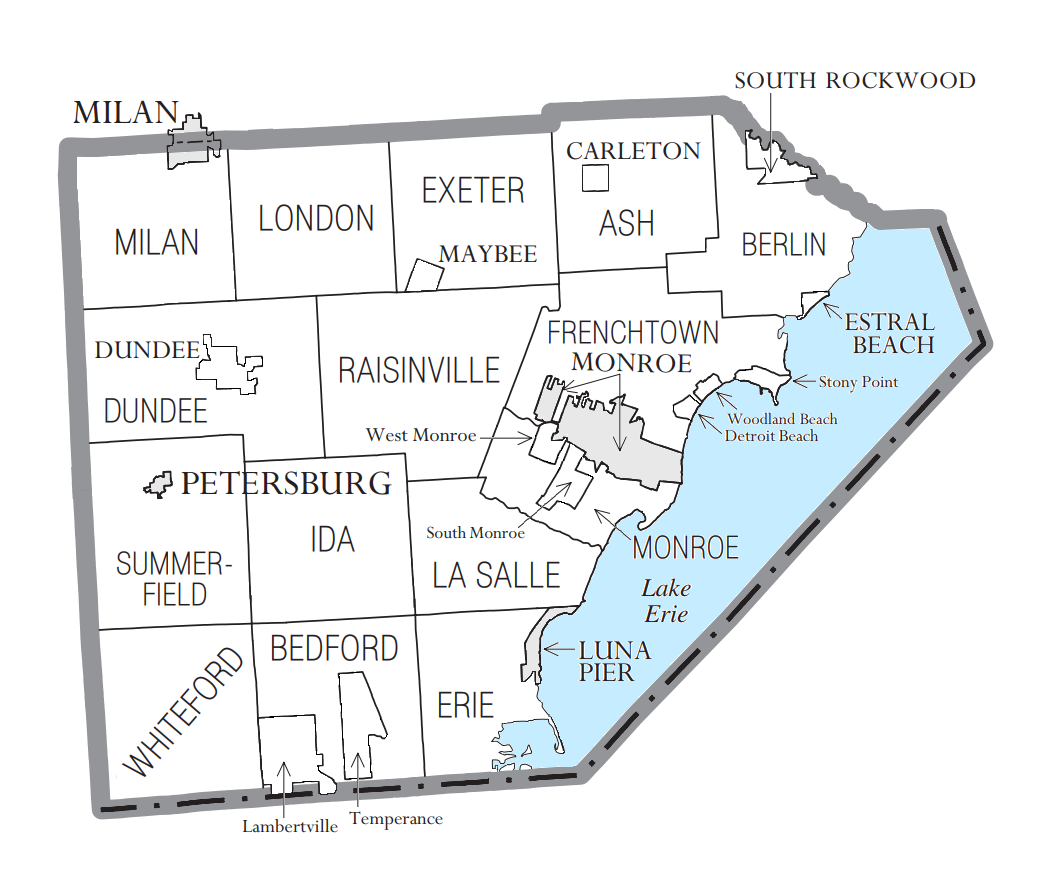
Monroe County

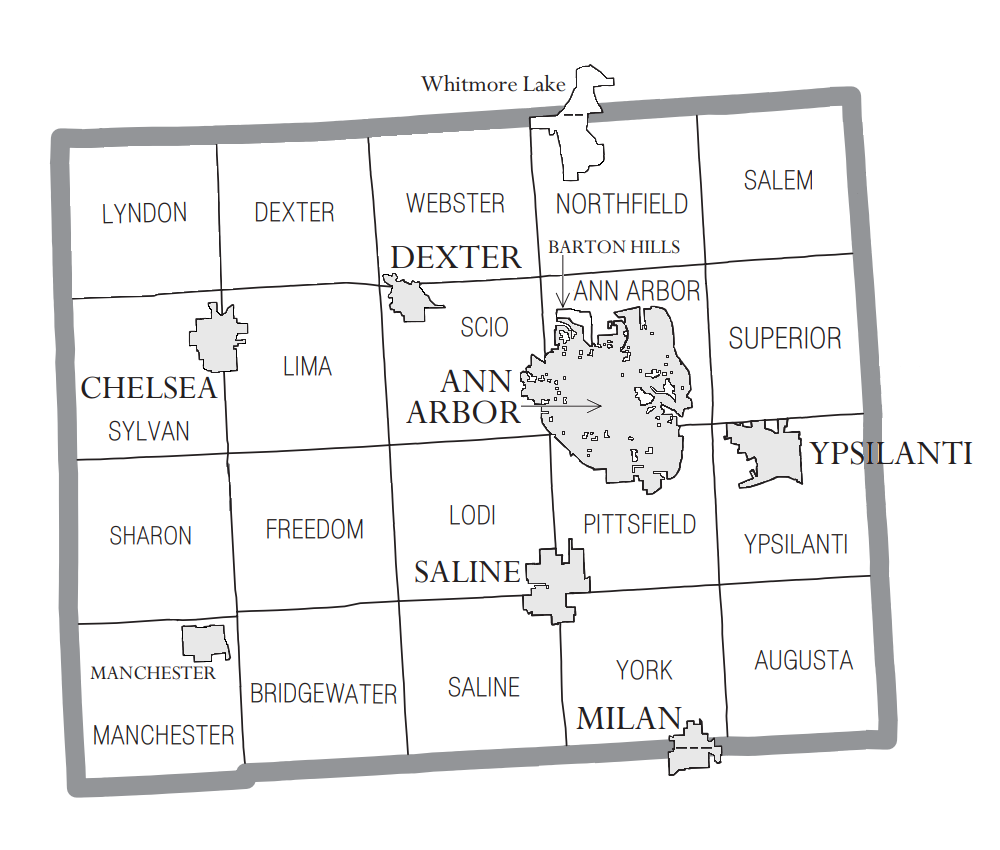
Washtenaw County

With the adjacent city of Windsor, Ontario, and its suburbs, the combined Detroit–Windsor area has a population of about 5.7 million. When the nearby Toledo metropolitan area and its commuters are taken into account, the region constitutes a much larger population center. An estimated 46 million people live within a 300-mile (480 km) radius of Detroit proper, including the major metropolitan areas of Chicago, Toronto and Cleveland. Metro Detroit is at the center of an emerging Great Lakes Megalopolis.

Conan Smith, a businessperson quoted in a 2012 article by The Ann Arbor News, stated the most significant reason Washtenaw County, including Ann Arbor, is not often included in definitions of Metro Detroit is that there is a "lack of affinity that Washtenaw County as a whole has with Wayne County and Detroit or Oakland County and Macomb". Ann Arbor is nearly 43 miles by car from Downtown Detroit, and developed separately as a university city, with its own character. Smith said that county residents "just don't yet see ourselves as a natural part of that [Detroit] region, so I think it feels a little forced to a lot of people, and they're scared about it".

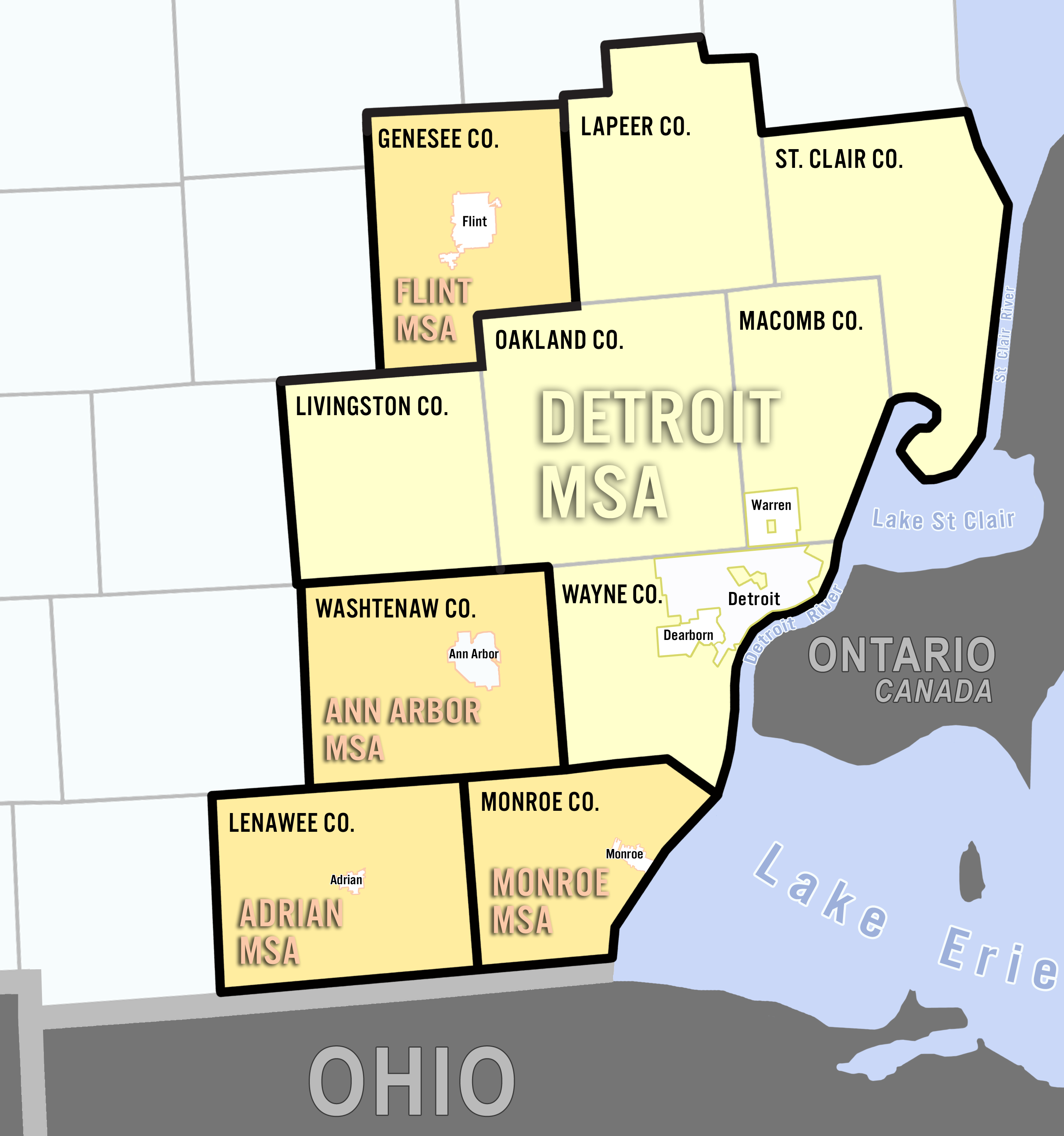
Detroit Region Within Southeast Michigan

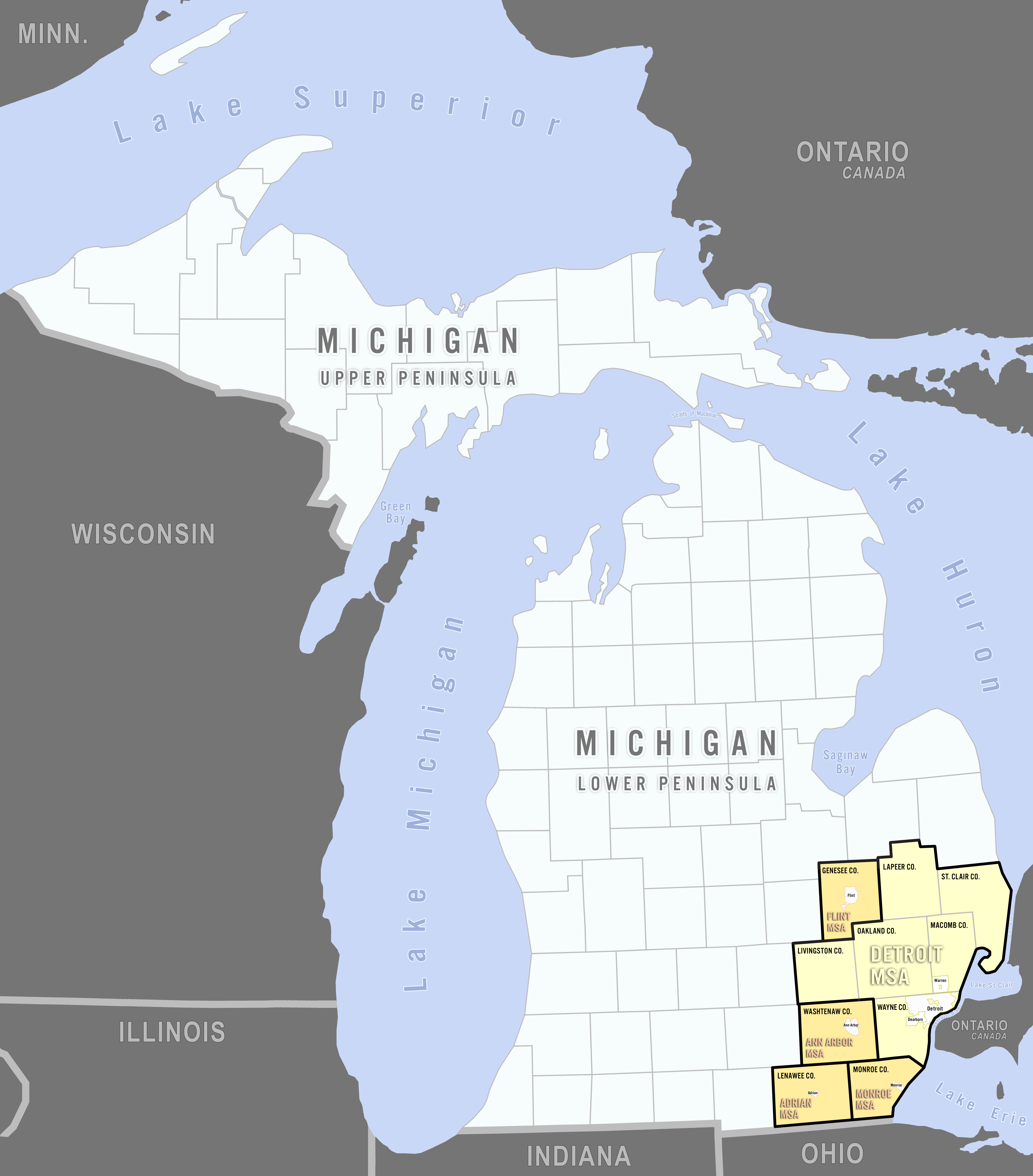
Detroit Region Within Michigan

== Economy ==
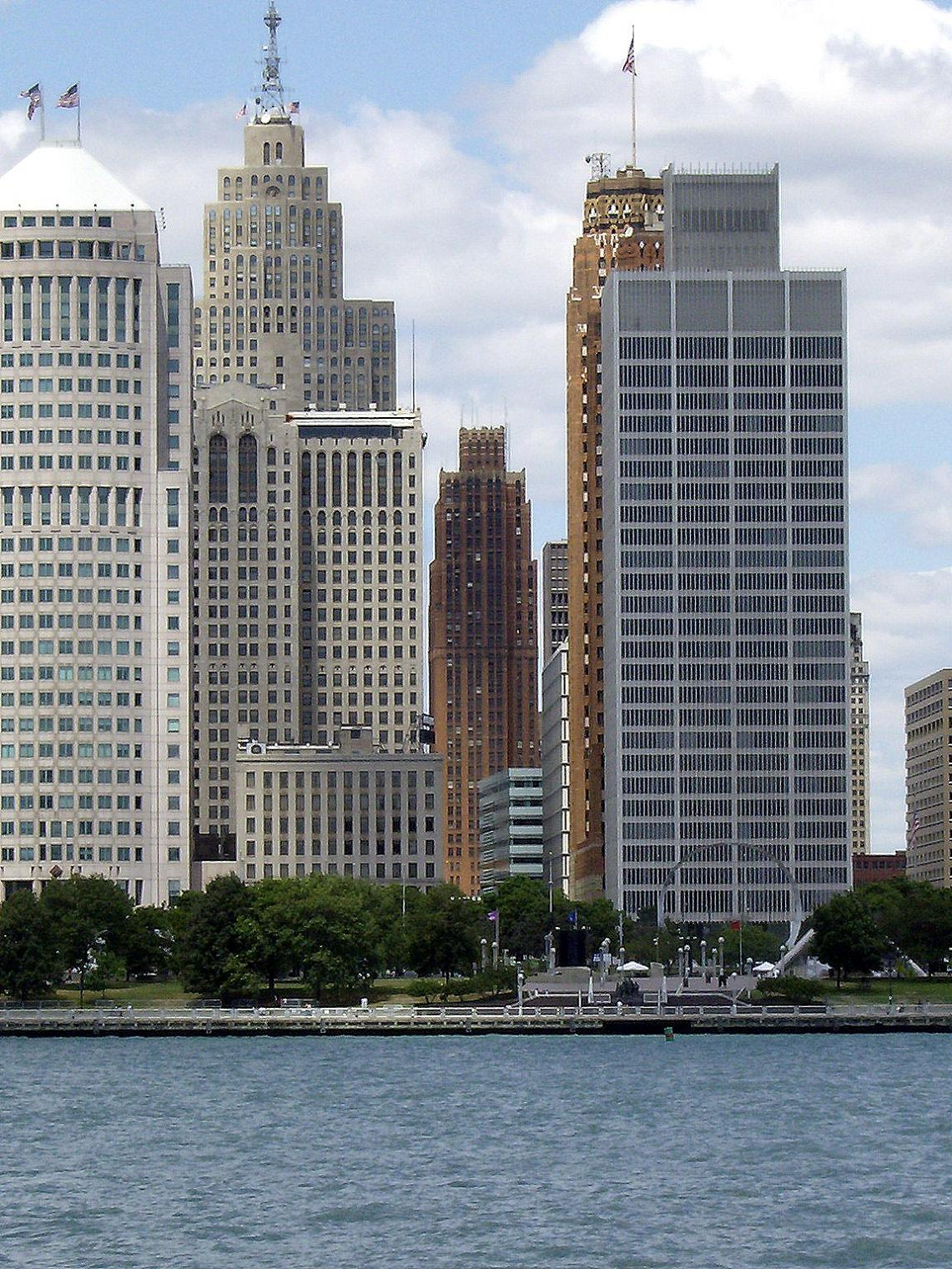
The Detroit Financial District viewed from the Detroit River

Detroit and the surrounding region constitute a major center of commerce and global trade, most notably as home to America's 'Big Three' automobile companies: General Motors, Ford, and Chrysler. Detroit's six-county Metropolitan Statistical Area (MSA) has a population of about 4.3 million and a workforce of about 2.1 million. In December 2017, the Department of Labor reported metropolitan Detroit's unemployment rate to be 4.2%. The Detroit MSA had a Gross Metropolitan Product (GMP) of $252.7 billion as of September 2017.

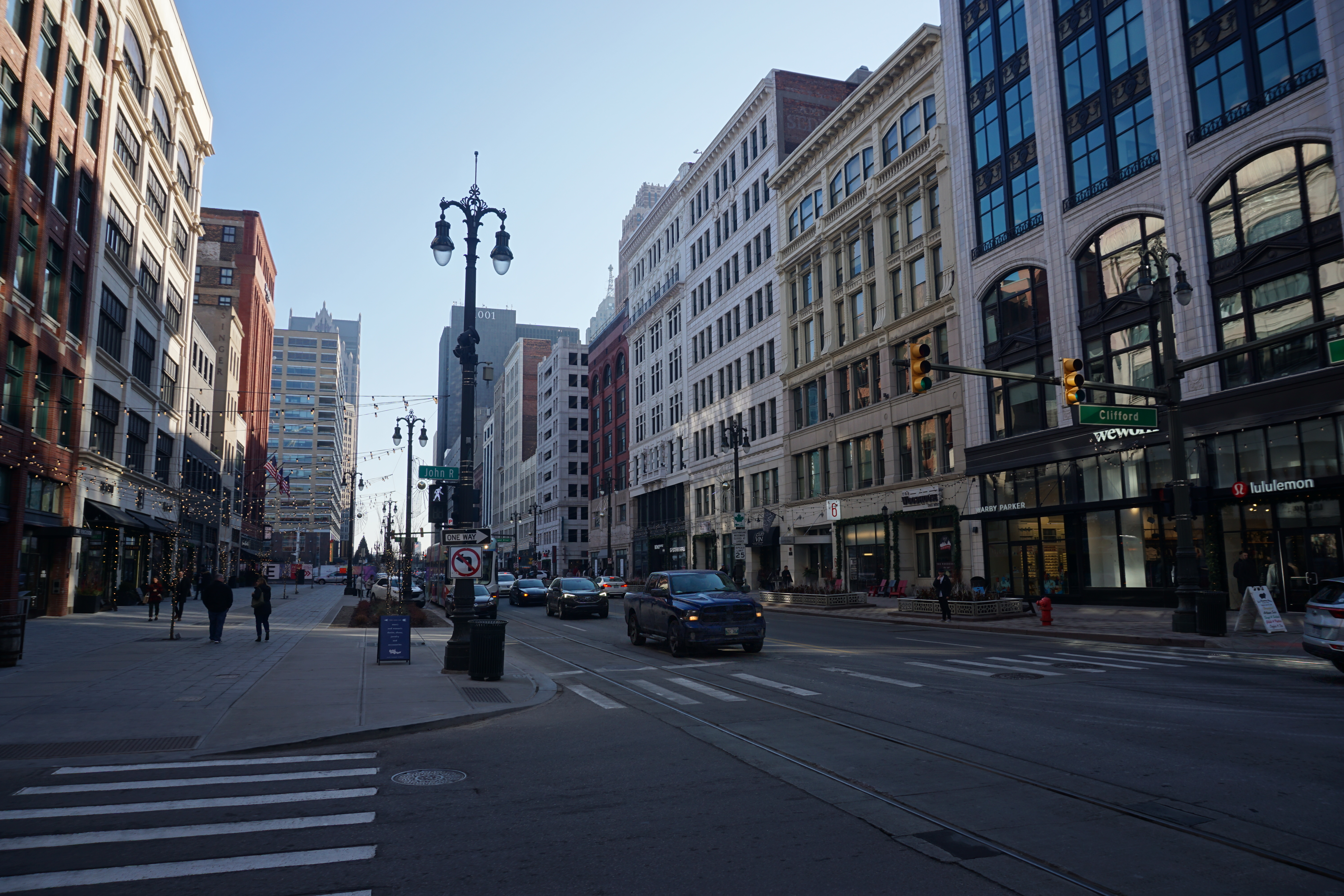
Merchants Row on Woodward Avenue between Grand Circus Park and Campus Martius Park in downtown Detroit

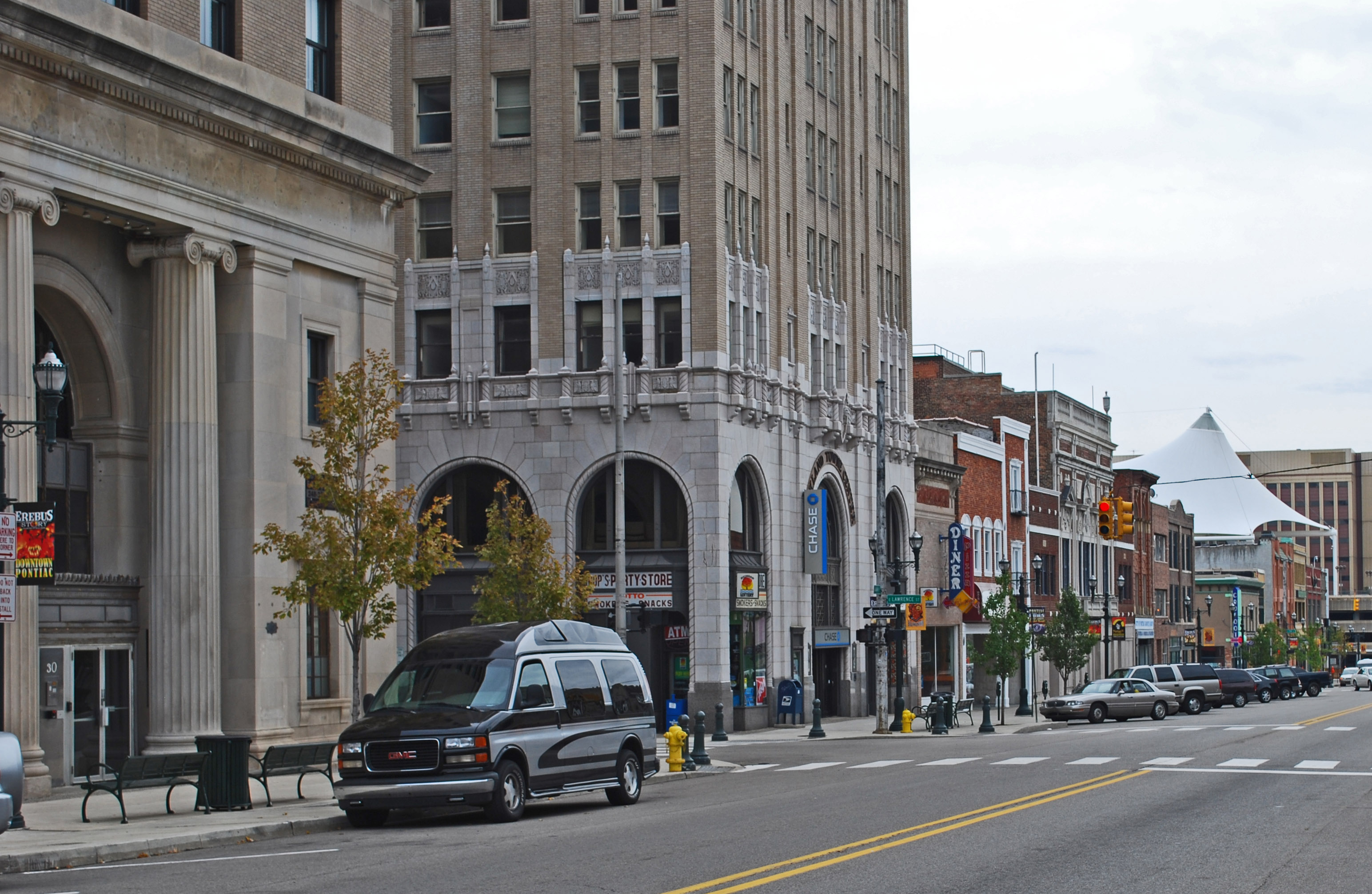
Pontiac Commercial Historic District in Pontiac

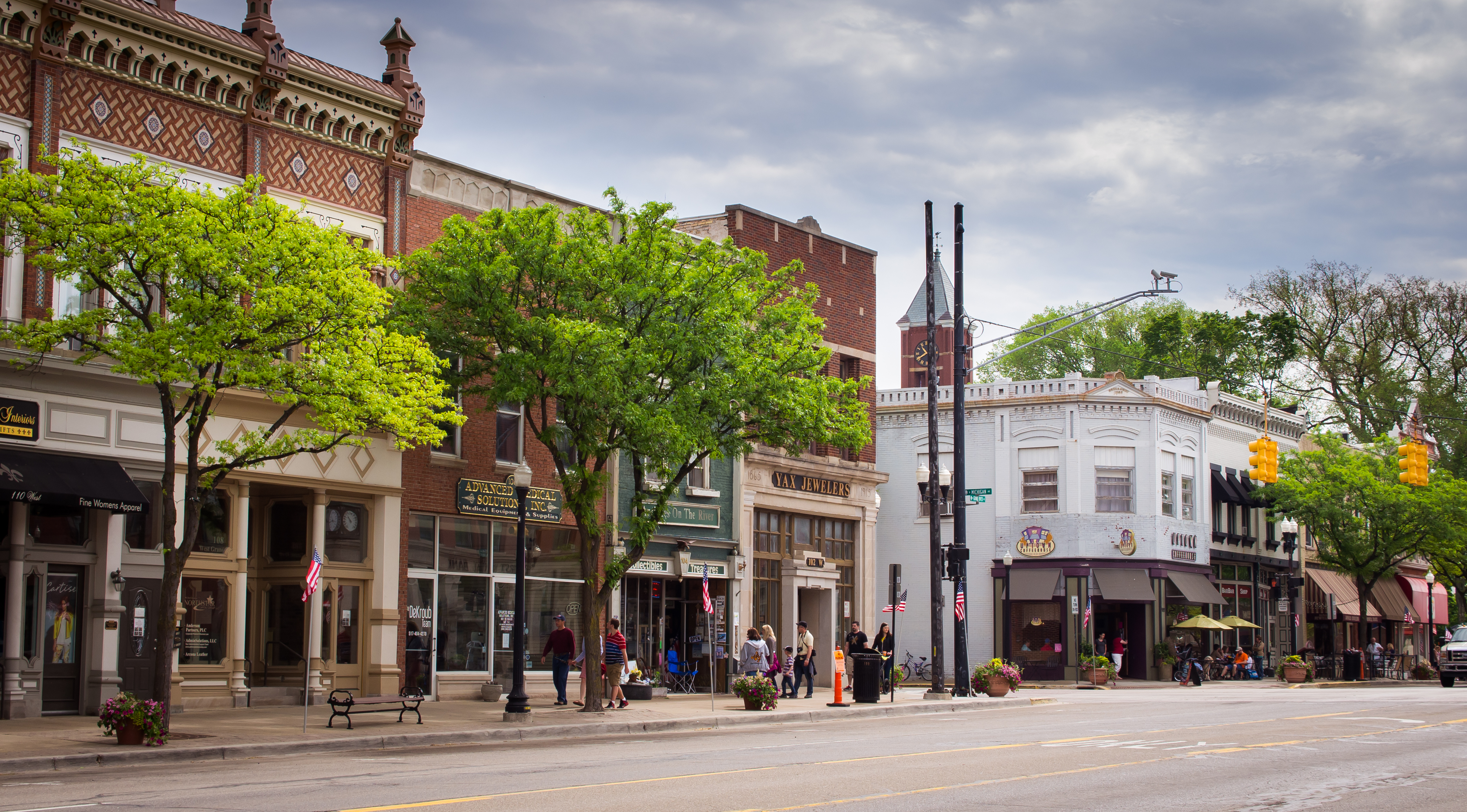
Downtown Howell

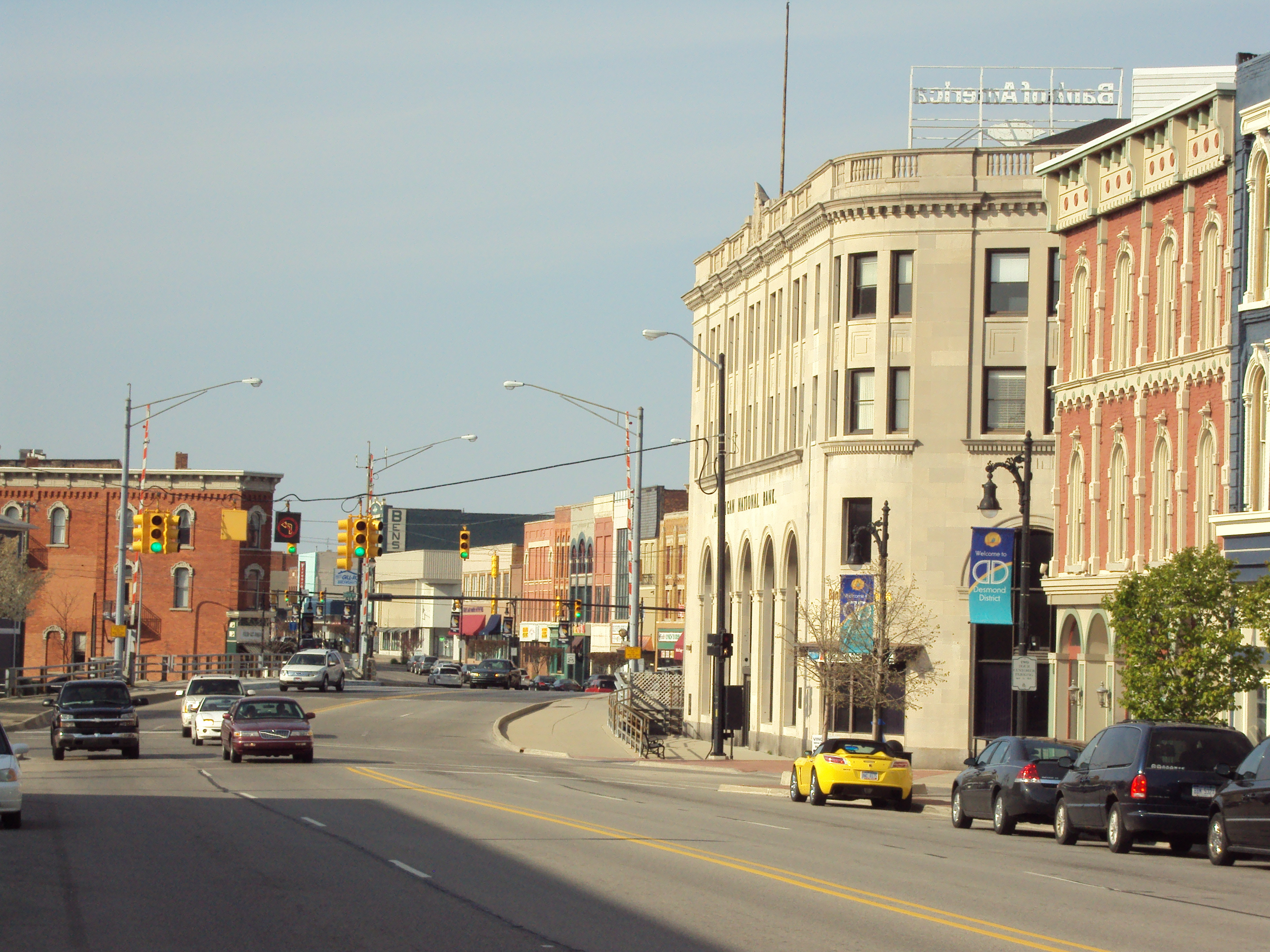
Military Road Historic District in Port Huron

Firms in the region pursue emerging technologies including biotechnology, nanotechnology, information technology, and hydrogen fuel cell development.

Metro Detroit is one of the leading health care economies in the U.S., according to a 2003 study measuring health care industry components, with the region's hospital sector ranked fourth in the nation.

Casino gaming plays an important economic role, with Detroit the largest US city to offer casino resort hotels. Caesars Windsor, Canada's largest, complements the MGM Grand Detroit, MotorCity Casino, and Hollywood Casino in the city. The casino hotels contribute significant tax revenue along with thousands of jobs for residents. Gaming revenues have grown steadily, with Detroit ranked as the fifth-largest gambling market in the United States for 2007. When Casino Windsor is included, Detroit's gambling market ranks either third or fourth.

There are about four thousand factories in the area. The domestic auto industry is primarily headquartered in Metro Detroit. The area is an important source of engineering job opportunities. A rise in automated manufacturing using robotic technology has created related industries in the area.

Detroit is a major U.S. port with an extensive toll-free expressway system. A 2004 Border Transportation Partnership study showed that 150,000 jobs in the Detroit-Windsor region and $13 billion in annual production depend on Detroit's international border crossing.

In addition to property taxes, residents of the City of Detroit pay an income tax rate of 2.50%.

Detroit automakers and local manufacturers have made significant restructurings in response to market competition. GM made its initial public offering (IPO) of stock in 2010, after bankruptcy, bailout, and restructuring by the federal government. Domestic automakers reported significant profits in 2010, interpreted by some analysts as the beginning of an industry rebound and an economic recovery for the Detroit area.

The region's nine-county area, with its population of 5.3 million, has a workforce of about 2.6 million and about 247,000 businesses. Fourteen Fortune 500 companies are based in metropolitan Detroit. In April 2015, the metropolitan Detroit unemployment rate was 5.1 percent, a rate lower than the New York, Los Angeles, Chicago and Atlanta metropolitan areas.

Metro Detroit has made Michigan's economy a leader in information technology, biotechnology, and advanced manufacturing. Michigan ranks fourth nationally in high-tech employment with 568,000 high-tech workers, including 70,000 in the automotive industry.

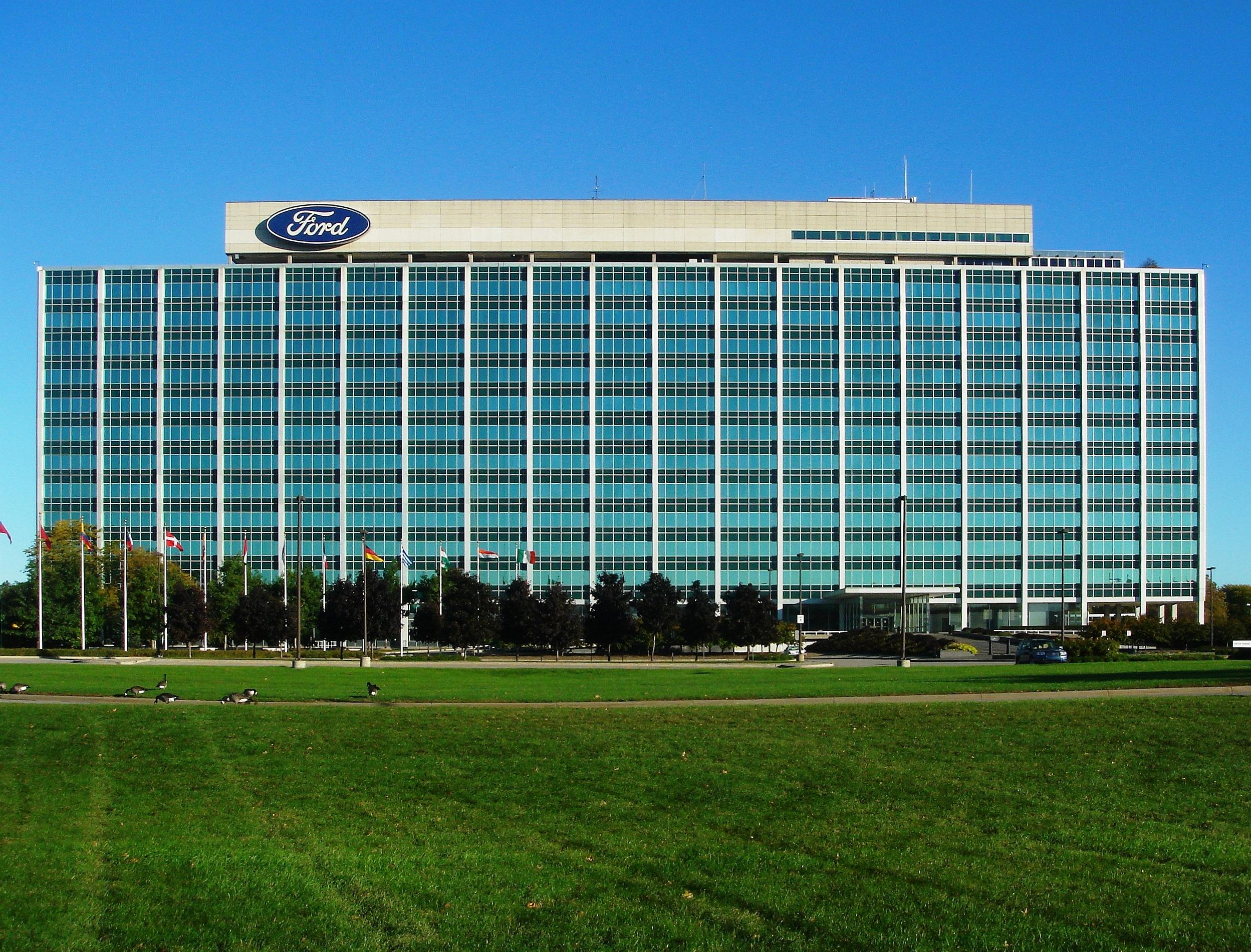
The Ford World Headquarters in Dearborn, also known as the Glass House.

Michigan typically ranks second or third in overall Research & development (R&D) expenditures in the United States. Metro Detroit is an important source of engineering and high-tech job opportunities. As the home of the "Big Three" American automakers (General Motors, Ford, and Chrysler), it is the world's traditional automotive center and a key pillar of the US economy. In the 2010s, the domestic auto industry accounts, directly and indirectly, for one of ten jobs in the United States, making it a significant component for economic recovery.

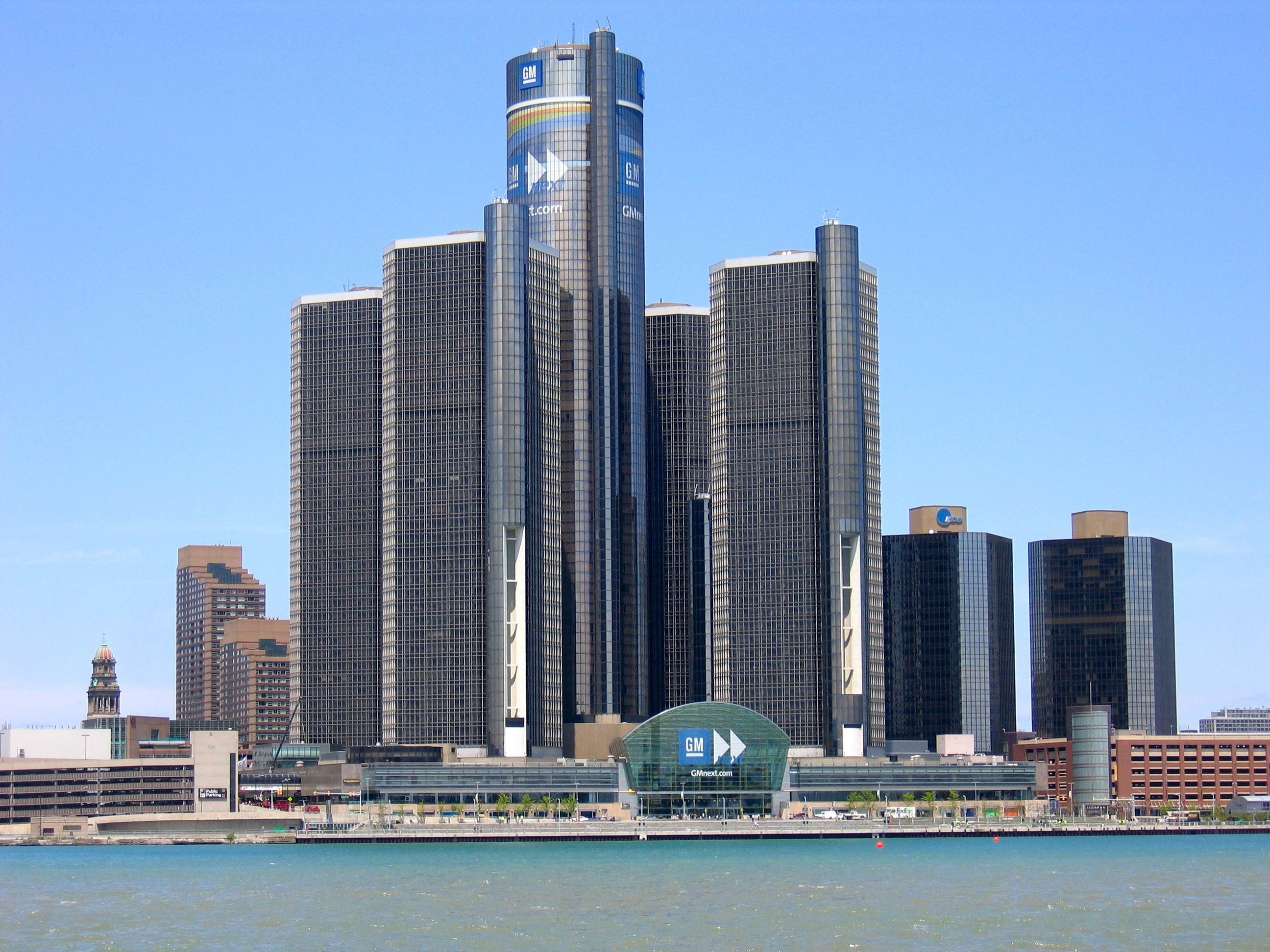
The General Motors World Headquarters, Renaissance Center in Downtown Detroit.

For 2010, the domestic automakers have reported significant profits indicating the beginning of rebound.

Metro Detroit serves as the headquarters for the United States Army TACOM Life Cycle Management Command (TACOM), with Selfridge Air National Guard Base. Detroit Metropolitan Airport (DTW) is one of America's largest and most recently modernized facilities, with six major runways, Boeing 747 maintenance facilities, and an attached Westin Hotel and Conference Center.

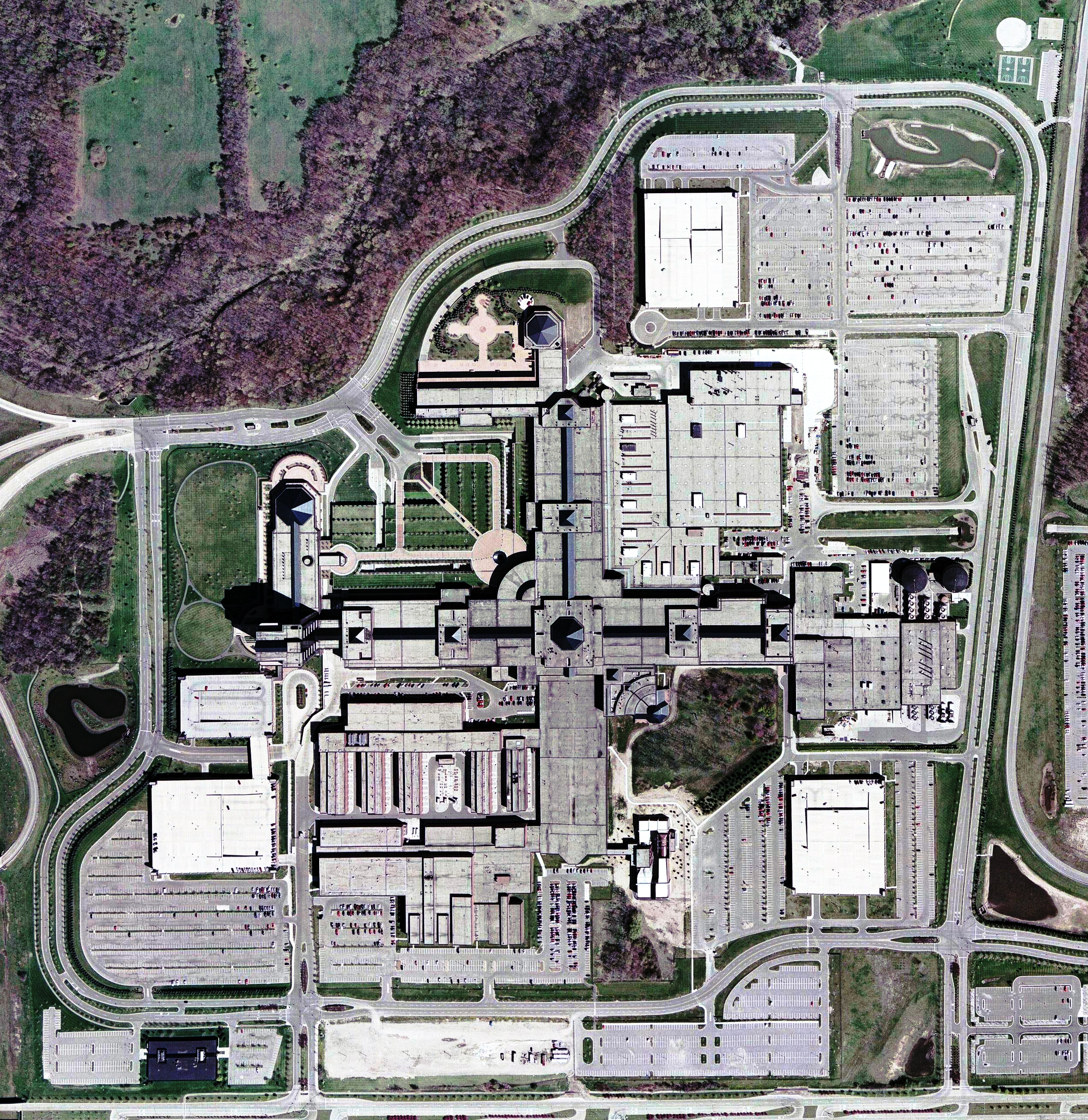
The Chrysler Headquarters in Auburn Hills

Metro Detroit is home to several universities, including the University of Michigan in Ann Arbor, University of Michigan-Dearborn in Dearborn, Oakland University in Oakland County, and Wayne State University in Detroit.

Metro Detroit is a prominent business center, with major commercial districts such as the Detroit Financial District and Renaissance Center, the Southfield Town Center, and the historic New Center district with the Fisher Building and Cadillac Place. Among the major companies based in the area, aside from the major automotive companies, are BorgWarner (Auburn Hills), Rocket Mortgage (Downtown Detroit), Ally Financial (Downtown Detroit), Carhartt (Dearborn), and Shinola (Detroit).

IBM and Google are among the technology companies with a major presence in Metro Detroit. HP Enterprise Services makes Detroit its regional headquarters, and one of its largest global employment locations. The metropolitan Detroit area has one of the nation's largest office markets with 147,082,003 square feet. Chrysler's largest corporate facility is its U.S. headquarters and technology center in the Detroit suburb of Auburn Hills, while Ford Motor Company is in Dearborn, directly adjacent to Detroit. In the decade leading up to 2006, downtown Detroit gained more than $15 billion in new investment from private and public sectors.

== Tourism ==
Tourism is an important component of the region's culture and economy, providing about nine percent of the area's two million jobs. About 15.9 million people visit metro Detroit annually, spending about $4.8 billion. Detroit is the largest city or metro area in the U.S. to offer casino resort hotels (MGM Grand Detroit, MotorCity Casino, Hollywood Casino, and nearby Caesars Windsor).

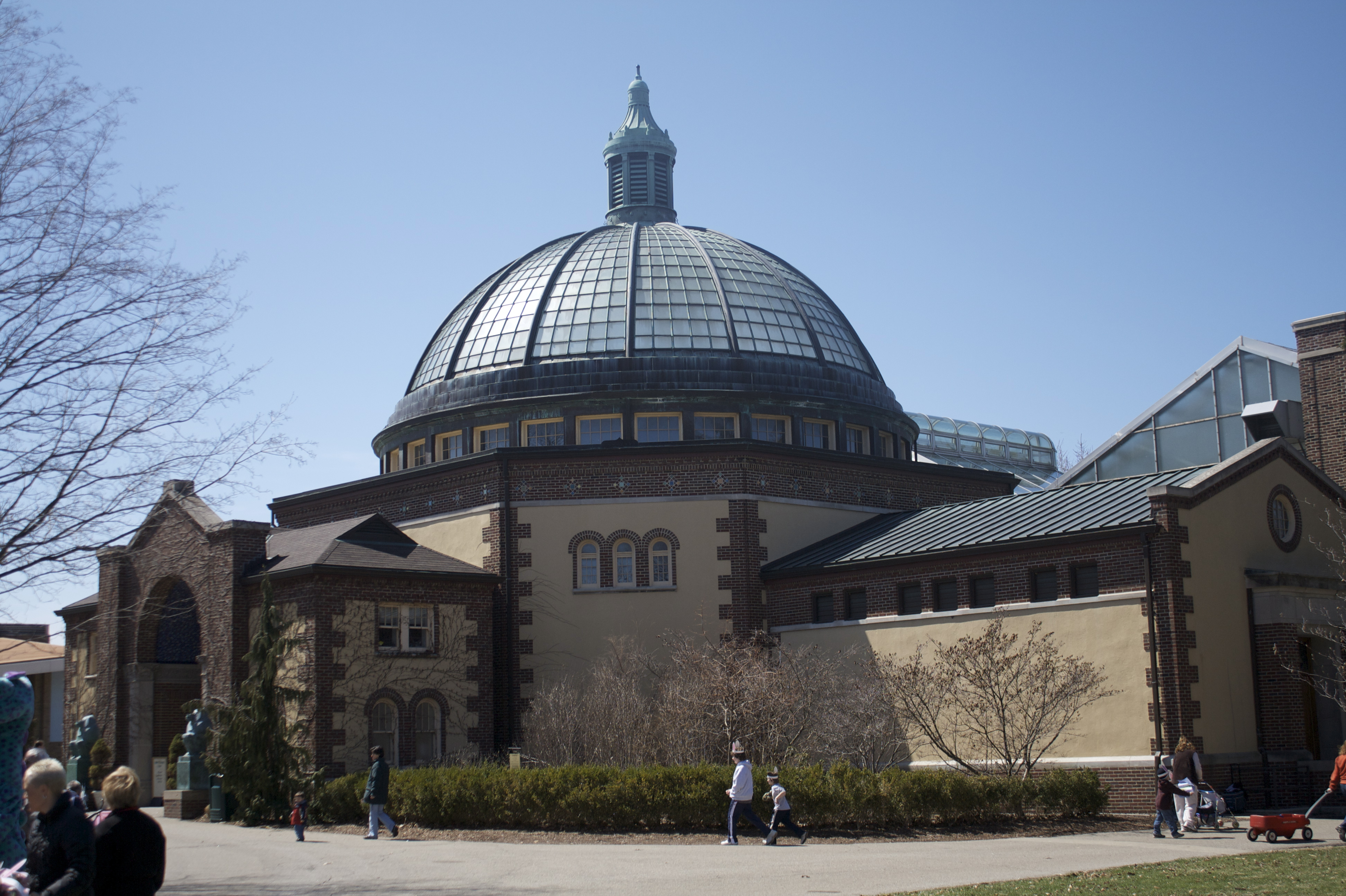
The Wildlife Interpretive Gallery at the Detroit Zoo

Metro Detroit is a tourist destination that easily accommodates super-sized crowds to events such as the Woodward Dream Cruise, North American International Auto Show, Youmacon, the Windsor-Detroit International Freedom Festival, 2009 NCAA Final Four, 2027 NCAA Final Four and Super Bowl XL. The Detroit International Riverfront links the Renaissance Center to a series of venues, parks, restaurants, and hotels. In 2006, the four-day Motown Winter Blast drew a cold weather crowd of about 1.2 million people to Campus Martius Park area downtown.

Detroit's metroparks include fresh water beaches, such as Metropolitan Beach, Kensington Beach, and Stony Creek Beach. Metro Detroit offers canoeing through the Huron-Clinton Metroparks. Sports enthusiasts can enjoy downhill and cross-county skiing at Alpine Valley Ski Resort, Mt. Brighton, Mt. Holly, and Pine Knob Ski Resort.

The Detroit River International Wildlife Refuge is the only international wildlife preserve in North America that is located in the heart of a major metropolitan area. The Refuge includes islands, coastal wetlands, marshes, shoals, and waterfront lands along 48 miles (77 km) of the Detroit River and Western Lake Erie shoreline.

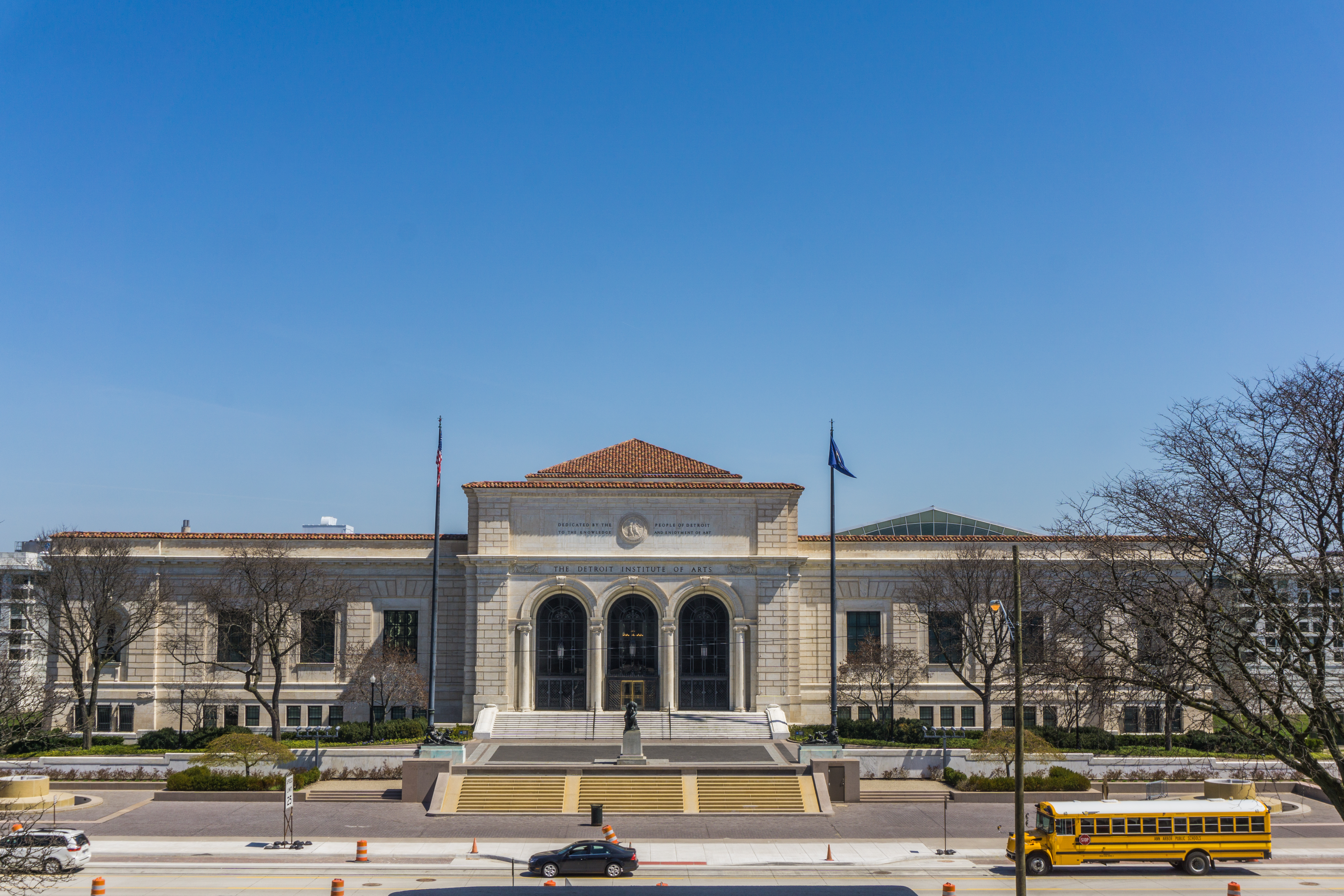
Detroit Institute of Arts

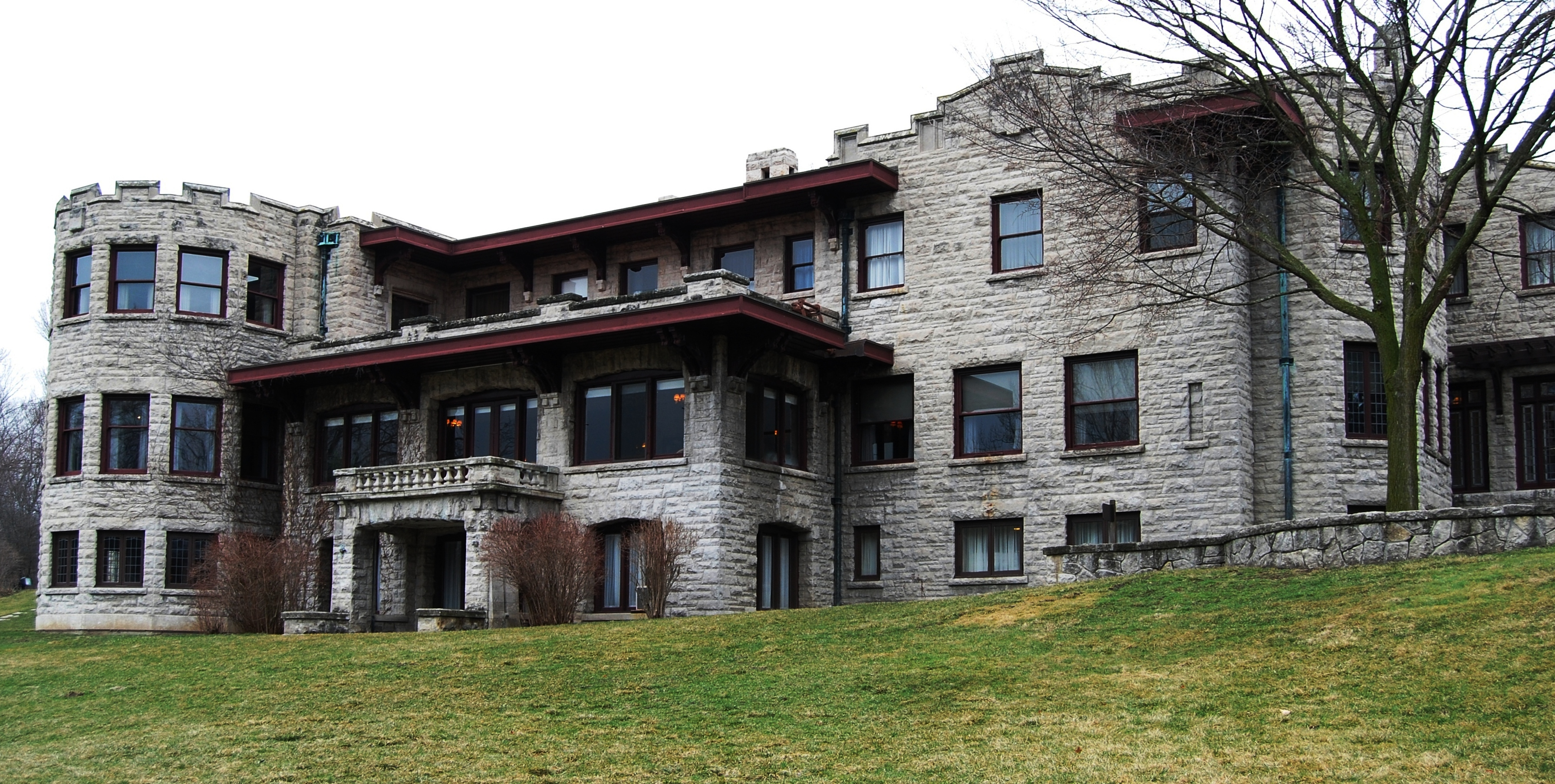
Henry Ford's Fair Lane estate in Dearborn

Metro Detroit contains a number of shopping malls, including the upscale Somerset Collection in Troy, Great Lakes Crossing Outlets in Auburn Hills, and Twelve Oaks Mall in Novi, all of which are draws for tourists.

The region's leading attraction is The Henry Ford, located in the Detroit suburb of Dearborn; it is America's largest indoor-outdoor museum complex.

The recent renovation of the Renaissance Center, and related construction of a state-of-the-art cruise ship dock, new stadiums, and a new RiverWalk, have stimulated related private economic development. Nearby Windsor has a 19-year-old drinking age with a myriad of entertainment to complement Detroit's Greektown district. Some analysts believe that tourism planners have yet to tap the full economic power of the estimated 46 million people who live within a 300-mile (480-km) radius of Detroit.

== Demographics ==
Historical population
Census	Pop.	Note	%±
1840	73,836		—
1850	120,490		63.2%
1860	194,860		61.7%
1870	264,893		35.9%
1880	340,194		28.4%
1890	432,348		27.1%
1900	529,362		22.4%
1910	709,883		34.1%
1920	1,407,111		98.2%
1930	2,292,528		62.9%
1940	2,506,530		9.3%
1950	3,170,315		26.5%
1960	3,949,720		24.6%
1970	4,431,390		12.2%
1980	4,353,365		−1.8%
1990	4,248,699		−2.4%
2000	4,452,557		4.8%
2010	4,296,250		−3.5%
2020	4,392,041		2.2%
2024 (est.)	4,400,578		0.2%
Metropolitan Statistical Area (MSA)

Historical population
Census	Pop.	Note	%±
1840	129,486		—
1850	202,158		56.1%
1860	312,749		54.7%
1870	413,305		32.2%
1880	503,229		21.8%
1890	594,773		18.2%
1900	700,087		17.7%
1910	899,976		28.6%
1920	1,667,181		85.2%
1930	2,672,033		60.3%
1940	2,927,014		9.5%
1950	3,716,179		27.0%
1960	4,675,382		25.8%
1970	5,309,922		13.6%
1980	5,293,169		−0.3%
1990	5,187,171		−2.0%
2000	5,456,428		5.2%
2010	5,318,744		−2.5%
2020	5,393,033		1.4%
2024 (est.)	5,430,523		0.7%
Combined Statistical Area (CSA)

Racial Composition of Metro Detroit (as of 2020)
Self-identified race	Percent of population
Non-Hispanic white	63.7%
Hispanic and Latino (of any race)	5.0%
Black or African American	21.8%
Asian	4.8%
Two or more races	5.9%
Native Americans and Alaska Natives	0.3%
Native Hawaiians and Other Pacific Islanders	0.02%

Metro Detroit is a six-county metropolitan statistical area (MSA) with a population of 4,392,041—making it the 14th-largest MSA in the United States as enumerated by the 2020 United States Census.

The Detroit region is a ten-county Combined Statistical Area (CSA) with a population of 5,325,219—making it the 12th-largest CSA in the United States as enumerated by the 2020 Census.

The Detroit–Windsor area, a commercial link straddling the Canada-U.S. border, has a total population of about 5,700,000.

As of the census of 2010, there were 4,296,250 people, 1,682,111 households, and 1,110,454 families residing within the metropolitan statistical area. The census reported 70.1% White, 22.8% African American, 0.3% Native American, 3.3% Asian, 0.02% Pacific Islander, 1.2% from other races, and 2.2% from two or more races. Hispanic or Latino of any race were 6.2% of the population. Arab Americans were at least 4.7% of the region's population (considered white in the US Census).

As of the 2010 American Community Survey estimates, the median income for a household in the MSA was $48,198, and the median income for a family was $62,119. The per capita income for the MSA was $25,403. The region's foreign-born population sat at 8.6%. The region contains the largest concentration of Arab-Americans in the United States, particularly in Dearborn. The metro area also has the 25th largest Jewish population worldwide.

In 1701, French officer Antoine de La Mothe Cadillac, along with fifty-one additional French-Canadians, founded a settlement called Fort Ponchartrain du Détroit, naming it after the comte de Pontchartrain, Minister of Marine under Louis XIV. The French legacy can be observed today in the names of many area cities (ex. Detroit, Grosse Pointe, Grosse Ile) and streets (ex. Gratiot, Beaubien, St. Antoine, Cadieux). Later came an influx of persons of British and German descent, followed by Polish, Irish, Italian, Lebanese, Assyrian, Armenian, Greek, Jewish, Maltese, and Belgian immigrants who made their way to the area in the early 20th century and during and after World War II. There was a large migration of African Americans into the city from the rural South during The Great Migration and following World War I.

Today, the Detroit suburbs in Oakland County, Macomb County, and northeastern and northwestern Wayne County are predominantly ethnic European American. Oakland County is among the most affluent counties in the United States, with a population of more than one million. In Wayne County, the city of Dearborn has a large concentration of Arab Americans, mainly Shi'ite Muslim Lebanese, whose ancestors immigrated here in the early 20th century. Recently, the area has witnessed some growth in ethnic Albanian, Asian and Hispanic populations.

Metro Detroit has a sizeable population of Indian Americans, with an estimated 1.5% of the population being of Indian descent. Indians Americans in Metro Detroit are employed in various engineering and medical fields.

Up until the 2000s, 115 of the 185 cities and townships in Metro Detroit were more than 95% white. African Americans have also moved to the suburbs with a dramatic shift in many places between the 2000-2010 census: in 2000 44% of the more than 240,000 suburban blacks lived in Inkster, Pontiac, Oak Park, and Southfield.

== Transportation ==
=== Airports ===
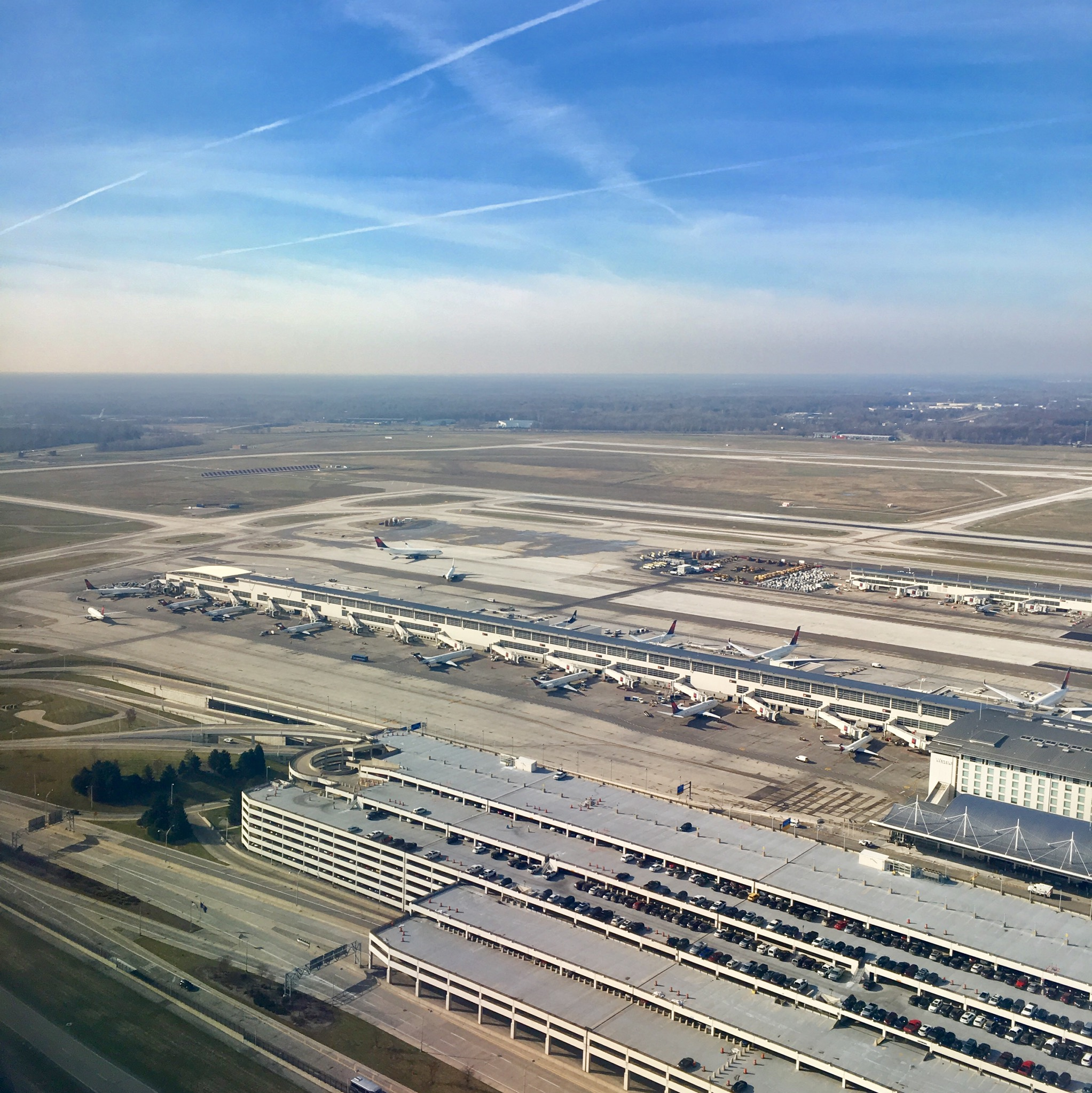
Detroit Metropolitan Airport, one of the largest air traffic hubs in the US.

The largest airport in the area is Detroit Metropolitan Wayne County Airport (DTW) in Romulus, an international airport that serves as a commercial hub for Delta Air Lines.The other airports in the metropolitan area are:

- Ann Arbor Municipal Airport (ARB)
- Coleman A. Young International Airport (DET) (Detroit) - General aviation only
- Flint-Bishop International Airport(FNT) (Flint) - Commercial airport
- Oakland County International Airport (PTK) Waterford Township - Charter passenger facility
- St. Clair County International Airport (near Port Huron, Michigan) - An international airport on the Canada–US border.
- Selfridge Air National Guard Base (Mount Clemens) - Military airbase
- Willow Run Airport (YIP) (Ypsilanti) - Cargo, general aviation, charter passenger traffic

=== Transit systems ===
Bus service for the metropolitan area is provided jointly by the Detroit Department of Transportation (DDOT) and Suburban Mobility Authority for Regional Transportation (SMART) which operate under a cooperative service and fare agreement. The elevated Detroit People Mover encircles downtown providing service to numerous downtown hotels, offices and attractions. The QLine began service in 2017 to provide service between downtown and New Center, and the proposed Ann Arbor–Detroit Regional Rail would extend from Detroit's New Center area to The Henry Ford, Dearborn, Detroit Metropolitan Airport, Ypsilanti, and Ann Arbor The Regional Transit Authority (RTA) was established in December 2012 to coordinate the services of all existing transit providers, and to develop a bus rapid transit service along Woodward Avenue.

=== Rail ===
The Amtrak Wolverine provides passenger rail service from Chicago to Pontiac. Stops in Metro Detroit include Ann Arbor, Dearborn, Detroit, Royal Oak, Troy, and Pontiac.

=== Roads and freeways ===
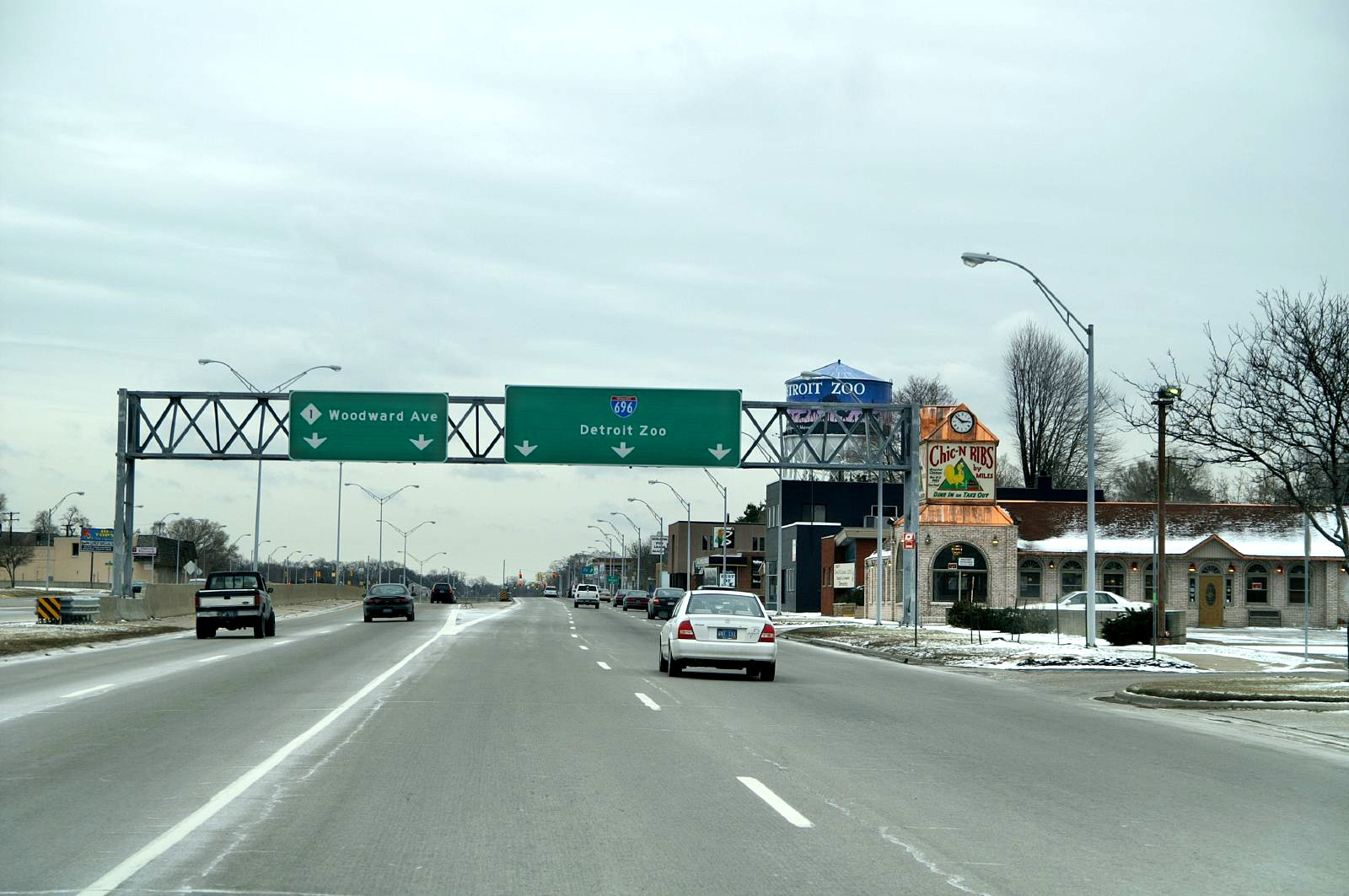
view of I-696 and M-1 (Woodward Avenue)

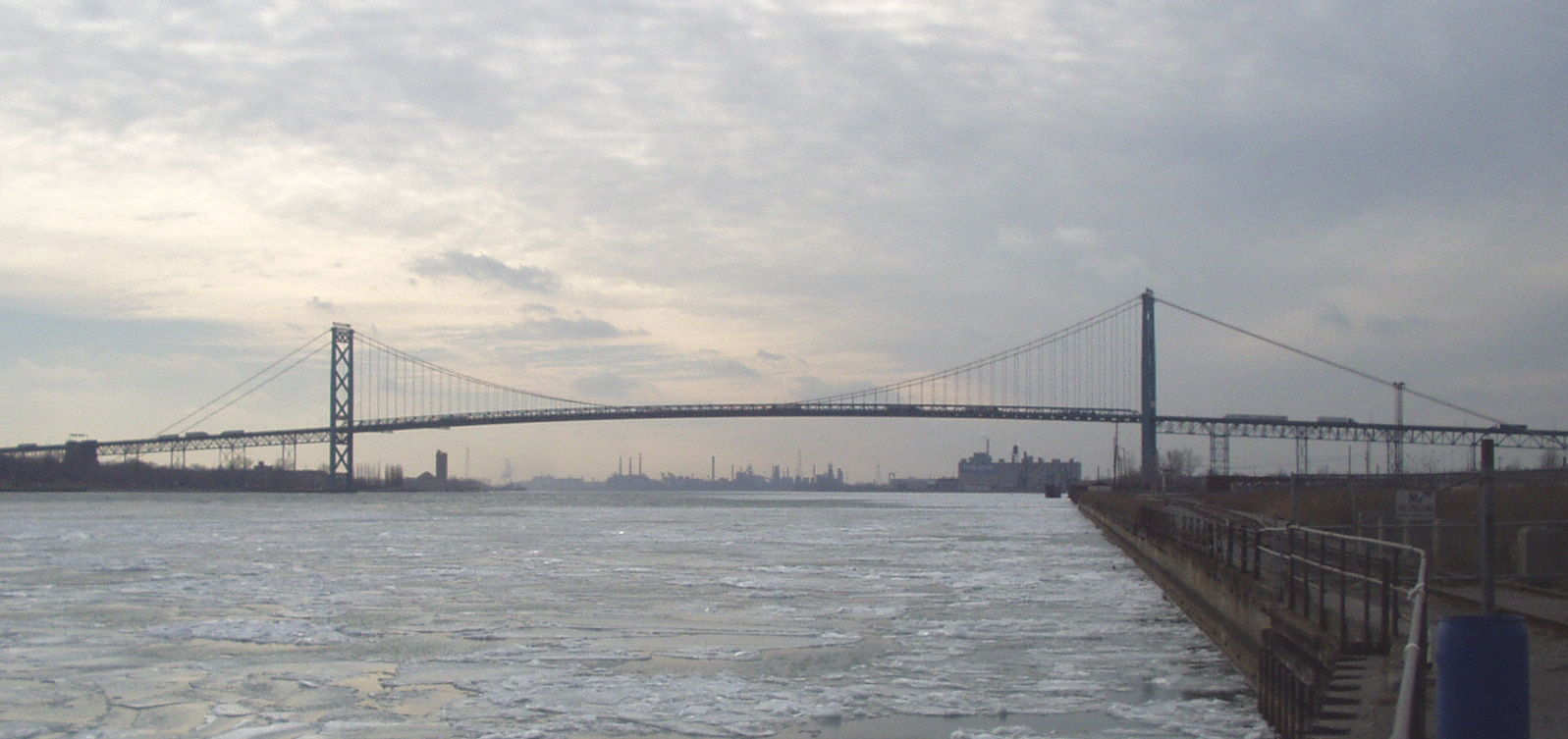
View of the Ambassador Bridge

The Metro Detroit area is linked by an advanced network of major roads and freeways which include Interstate highways. Traditionally, Detroiters refer to some of their freeways by name rather than route number. The Davison, Lodge, and Southfield freeways are almost always referred to by name rather than route number. Detroiters commonly precede freeway names with the word 'the' as in the Lodge, the Southfield, and the Davison. Those without names are referred to by number, also interstate 696 is commonly referred as "the Autobahn of America" due to frequent speeders and reckless driving and the common auto accidents every day on that freeway.

Surface street navigation in Metro Detroit is commonly anchored by "mile roads", major east–west surface streets that are spaced at one-mile (1.6 km) intervals and increment as one travels north and away from the city center. Mile roads sometimes have two names, the numeric name (ex. 15 Mile Road) used in Macomb County and a local name (ex. Maple Road) used in Oakland County mostly.

== Education ==
=== Colleges and universities ===
- Baker College — Auburn Hills and Royal Oak
- Central Michigan University — Clinton Township, Troy, and Southfield
- Cleary University — Detroit and Howell
- College for Creative Studies — Detroit
- Concordia University Ann Arbor — Ann Arbor
- Cranbrook Academy of Art — Bloomfield Hills
- Davenport University — Detroit and Warren
- Dorsey College — Dearborn, Madison Heights, Roseville, Wayne and Woodhaven
- Eastern Michigan University — Ypsilanti
- Henry Ford College — Dearborn
- Kettering University — Flint
- Lansing Community College — Howell
- Lawrence Technological University — Southfield
- Macomb Community College — Warren and Clinton Township
- Madonna University — Livonia
- Michigan State University Management Education Center — Troy
- Michigan State University Detroit Campus — Detroit
- Monroe County Community College — Monroe
- Mott Community College — Flint
- Northwood University — Midland
- Oakland Community College — Auburn Hills, Farmington Hills, Highland Lakes, Royal Oak and Southfield
- Oakland University — Auburn Hills and Rochester Hills
- Rochester College — Rochester
- Saint Clair County Community College — Port Huron
- Schoolcraft College — Livonia
- Specs Howard School of Media Arts — Southfield
- Sacred Heart Major Seminary — Detroit
- SS. Cyril and Methodius Seminary — Orchard Lake
- University of Detroit Mercy — Detroit
- University of Michigan–Ann Arbor — Ann Arbor
- University of Michigan–Dearborn — Dearborn
- University of Michigan Detroit Center — Detroit
- University of Michigan–Flint — Flint
- Walsh College — Troy
- Washtenaw Community College — Ann Arbor
- Wayne County Community College — Detroit
- Wayne State University — Detroit and Warren (Macomb Campus)

== Crime ==
The principal City of Detroit has struggled with high crime for decades. About half of all murders in Michigan in 2015 occurred in Detroit. Since 2013, the FBI has reported a 26% decrease in property crimes and a 27% decrease in violent crimes.

== Sports ==
Professional sports has a major fan following in Metro Detroit. The area is home to many sports teams, including seven professional teams in five major sports. The area's several universities field teams in a variety of sports. Michigan Stadium, home of the Michigan Wolverines, is the largest American football stadium in the world. Metro Detroit hosts many annual sporting events including auto and hydroplane racing. The area has hosted many major sporting events, including the 1994 FIFA World Cup, Super Bowl XVI, Super Bowl XL, Wrestlemania 23, the 2005 Major League Baseball All-Star Game, many Stanley Cup Championship rounds, the first two games of the 2006 World Series, and the last two games of the 2012 World Series. Multiple NBA finals games have been held in Metro Detroit in 1988, 1989, 1990, 2004 and 2005. The 2024 NFL Draft was held in Detroit at Campus Martius Park and Hart Plaza.

Detroit area teams
Club	Sport	League (Conf)	Venue	Location
Detroit Lions	American football	NFL	Ford Field	Detroit
Detroit Tigers	Baseball	MLB	Comerica Park	Detroit
Detroit Pistons	Basketball	NBA	Little Caesars Arena	Detroit
Detroit Red Wings	Ice hockey	NHL	Little Caesars Arena	Detroit
Detroit Clutch	Ice hockey	PWHL	Little Caesars Arena	Detroit
Detroit City FC	Soccer	USLC	Keyworth Stadium	Hamtramck
Michigan Stars FC	Soccer	NISA	Barnabo Field	Romeo
Gold Star FC	Soccer	NISA	Madonna University	Livonia
Detroit Coast II Coast All-Stars	Basketball	American Basketball Association	Cass Technical High School	Detroit
Motor City Firebirds	Basketball	American Basketball Association	Inkster Recreation Complex	Inkster
Oakland County Cowboys	Basketball	American Basketball Association	Walled Lake Central High School	Walled Lake
Team NetWork	Basketball	American Basketball Association	Romulus Athletic Center	Romulus
Detroit Wolfetones Gaelic Football	Gaelic Football	Gaelic Athletic Association	Flodin Park	Detroit
USA Hockey National Team Development Program	Ice Hockey	United States Hockey League	USA Hockey Arena	Plymouth
Metro Jets	Ice Hockey	North American 3 Hockey League	Fraser Hockeyland	Fraser
Detroit Fighting Irish	Ice Hockey	United States Premier Hockey League	Brownstown Sports Arena	Brownstown
Motor City Hawks	Ice Hockey	United States Premier Hockey League	McCann Arena	Grosse Pointe
Flint City Bucks	Soccer	USL2	Atwood Stadium	Pontiac
Oakland County FC	Soccer	USL2	Royal Oak High School	Clawson
Carpathia FC	Soccer	NPSL	Carpathia Club	Sterling Heights
Detroit Roller Derby	Roller derby	WFTDA	Masonic Temple	Detroit
Detroit Tradesmen	Rugby union	USA Rugby	Glenn W. Levey Middle School	Detroit
Detroit rugby league team	Rugby league	AMNRL	N/A	Detroit
Detroit Mechanix	Ultimate Frisbee	American Ultimate Disc League	Ultimate Soccer Arenas	Pontiac
Eastern Michigan Eagles	various	NCAA (MAC)	various, including Rynearson Stadium	Ypsilanti
Oakland University Golden Grizzlies	various	NCAA (Horizon League)	various, including Athletics Center O'rena	Rochester
University of Detroit Mercy Titans	various	NCAA (Horizon League)	various, including Calihan Hall	Detroit
University of Michigan Wolverines	various	NCAA (Big Ten)	various, including Michigan Stadium	Ann Arbor
Wayne State University Warriors	various	NCAA (Great Lakes, CHA)	various	Detroit

The Michigan International Speedway in Brooklyn hosts various Auto racing: NASCAR, INDYCAR, and ARCA. The Detroit River hosts Hydroplane racing held by the APBA for the Detroit APBA Gold Cup.

== Area codes ==
Metro Detroit is served by nine telephone area codes (six not including Windsor). The 313 area code, which used to encompass all of Southeast Michigan, is today confined exclusively to the City of Detroit and several neighboring Wayne County suburbs (they also use a overlay number being 679).

- The 248 area code along with the newer 947 area code overlay mostly serve Oakland County.
- Macomb County is largely served by 586.
- Genesee, St. Clair, and Lapeer counties, eastern Livingston County, and part of northern Oakland County are covered by 810.
- Washtenaw, Monroe, and most of the Wayne County suburbs are in the 734 area.
- The Windsor area (and most of southwestern Ontario) is served by an overlay complex of three codes — 519, 226, and 548.
