= Pontiac Commercial Historic District =

- U.S. National Register of Historic Places
- U.S. Historic district
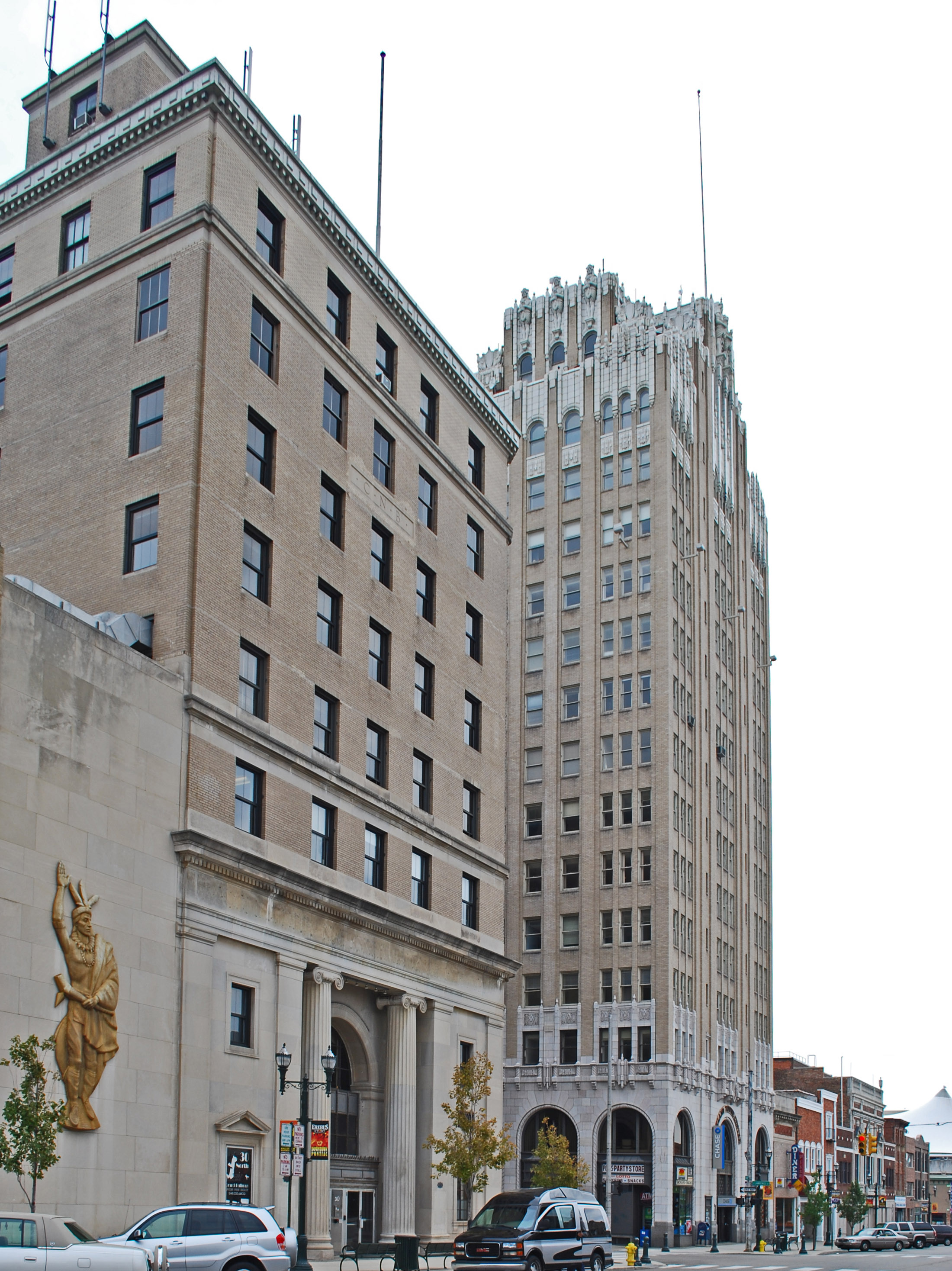
- Corner of Lawrence and Saginaw
- Interactive map
- Location: Roughly E. Huron St. and S. Saginaw St. within the Woodward Ave. Loop (formerly Wide Track Dr.), Pontiac, Michigan
- Coordinates: 42°38′13″N 83°17′35″W
- Area: 2.1 acres (0.85 ha)
- Built: 1865
- Architect: Smith, Hinchman & Grylls, other
- Architectural style: Early Commercial, Gothic, Tapestry Brick, Renaissance Revival
- NRHP reference No.: 84001817 (original); 89000491 (increase)

Significant dates
- Added to NRHP: February 16, 1984
- Boundary increase: June 23, 1989

The Pontiac Commercial Historic District is a primarily commercial historic district located roughly along East Huron and South Saginaw Streets, within the Woodward Avenue Loop (formerly known as Wide Track Drive), in Pontiac, Michigan. The core of the district, within the block bounded by Saginaw, Lawrence, Pike, and Wayne Streets, was originally listed on the National Register of Historic Places in 1984. A boundary increase creating the present boundaries was listed in 1989. The district includes the Eagle Theater and the Grinnell Brothers Music House, also listed on the National Register.

== History ==
Pontiac was founded in 1818-19 by a group of investors. In 1819, Oakland County was established, with a county seat at Pontiac. By 1820, Pontiac had a dam, a sawmill, a flour mill, and a blacksmith shop. A courthouse was constructed in 1824, and by 1830 the city of Pontiac was clearly the center of commerce for the county. In 1840, the business district was completely leveled by fire. Buildings were rebuilt in the district, including a series of buildings in the heart of the district, facing North Saginaw between West Pike and West Lawrence Streets, which are still extant.

The industrial growth of the city only really began in 1886 when a carriage factory was established by local businessman Charles V. Taylor. By 1900, three quarters of the male workers in the city were employed in the carriage and buggy trade. By 1907 these factories were being converted to serves the automobile industry, and in 1909 General Motors absorbed many of the independent manufacturers, leading to an explosive growth in population. This growth led to a rebuilding of the central business district in the first three decades of the twentieth century, and much of the district contains buildings constructed during this time.

== Description ==
The Pontiac Commercial Historic District contains parts of sixteen blocks in downtown Pontiac including the single block within the original 1984 district. This block contains sixteen buildings, of which fourteen contribute to the historic nature of the district. The remainder of the district contains an additional 84 buildings, of which 53 contribute to the historic nature of the district.

=== Original 1984 district ===
The original portion of the district designated in 1984 is located within a single block bounded by Saginaw, Lawrence, Pike, and Wayne Streets. The buildings are all commercial brick structures of two or three stories in height, fronting on the sidewalk. The eastern half of the block, fronting on Saginaw, was completely rebuilt some time after time 1840 fire and prior to 1865. Nearly all of these buildings, the oldest in the district, remain, running from 1 to 21 North Saginaw and interrupted only by a single non-contributing structure at 17 N. Saginaw. Many of the buildings were remodeled in the 1910s and 1920s, resulting in a breadth of architectural styles represented in the facades. Other buildings on the block, fronting on Lawrence and Pike, were originally constructed in the 1910s and 1920s.

=== Boundary increase ===
The buildings in the 1989 boundary increase were primarily constructed during Pontiac's boom years of 1900-1930, although the district does include some structures from the late 19th century. The buildings span a series of architectural styles, from a Second Empire and Late Victorian brick commercial buildings from the 19th century to Neo-Classical Revival, Renaissance Revival, Adamesque, Romanesque, Gothic Revival, and Art Deco buildings from the 20th. Significant structures in the district include:

- Turk Building (71-75 North Saginaw): Built in 1900, this is one of the oldest buildings in the district of substantial size. It is a three-store-wide Romanesque building with corbelled brickwork.
- The Strand (Campus) Theatre (12-14 North Saginaw): No longer containing its original theater interior, the Strand still has its facade with delicate Adam ornamentation, including fluted pilasters dividing the facade into three parts.
- Post Office (now the Furlong Building) (35 East Huron): Built in 1910 from plans taken from the office of the Treasury architect, John Knox Taylor, the post office is a limestone building with a series of Ionic columns extending across the center of the facade.
- The Eagle Theatre (15 South Saginaw): A Moorish theater, also listed on the National Register of Historic Places.
- Grinnell Brothers Music House (27 South Saginaw): A somewhat Gothic structure, also listed on the National Register of Historic Places.
- Masonic Temple (1 Lafayette): A 1923 building of unique, Michigan-centric design, with double and triple-arch windows each set within a slightly recessed archways.

== Gallery ==
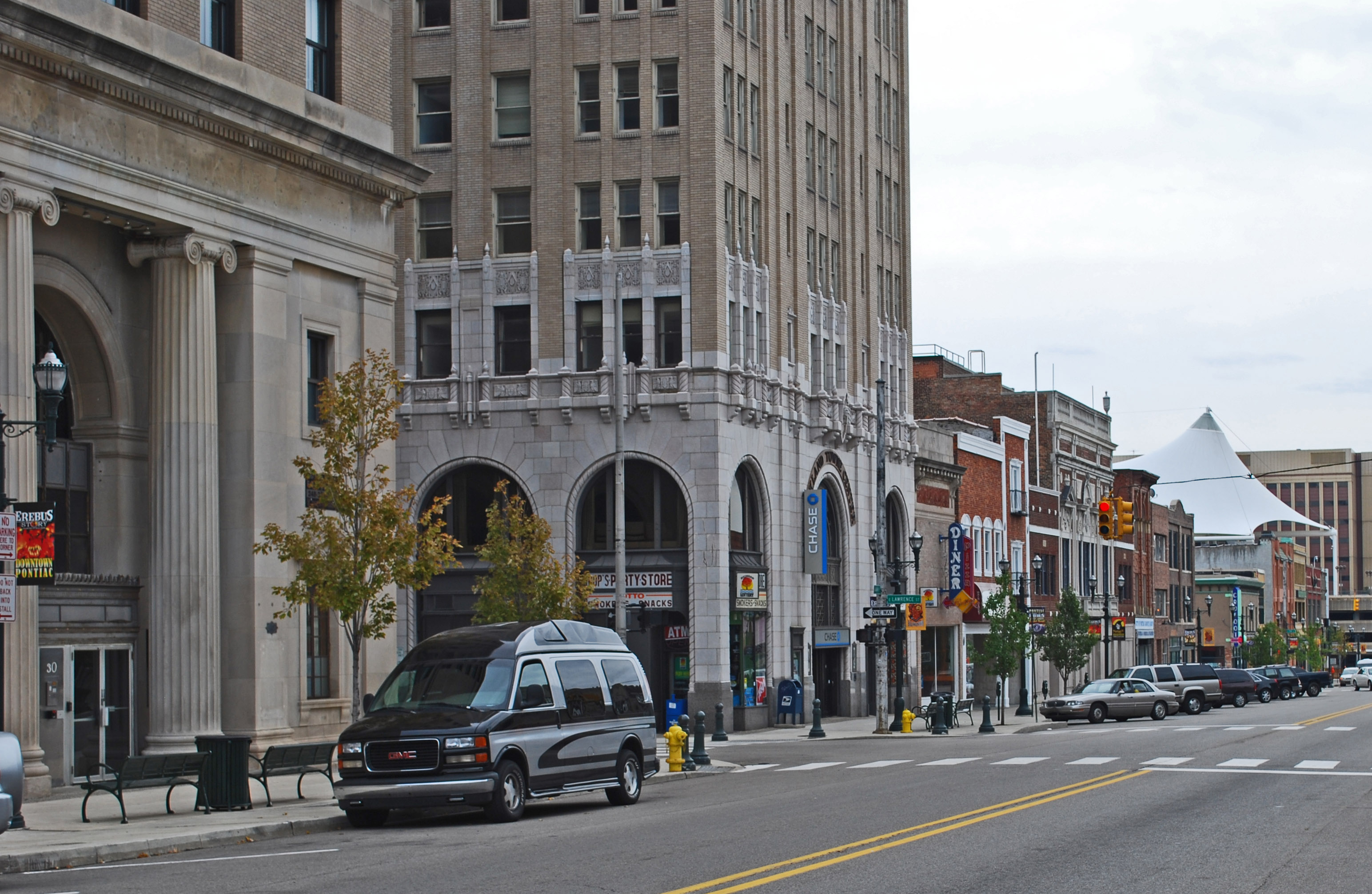
Detail, Corner of Lawrence and Saginaw, east side

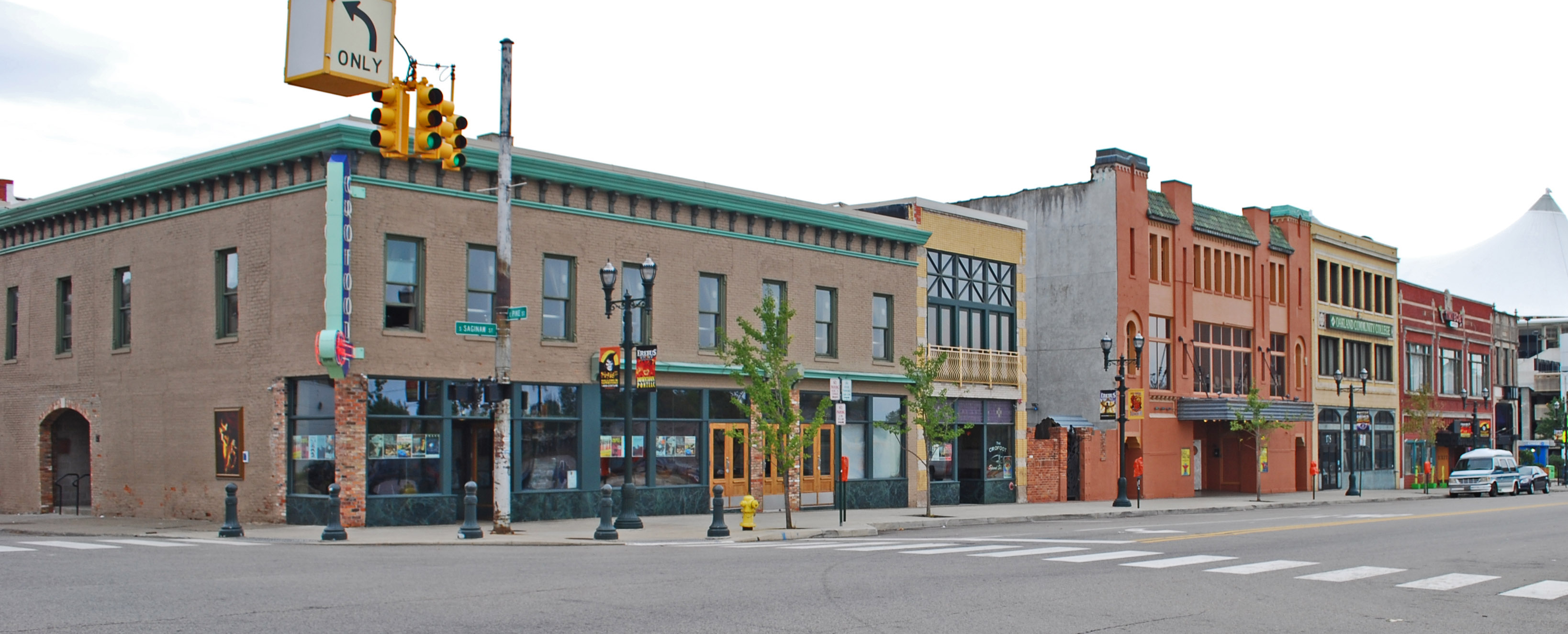
SE corner of Saginaw and Pike

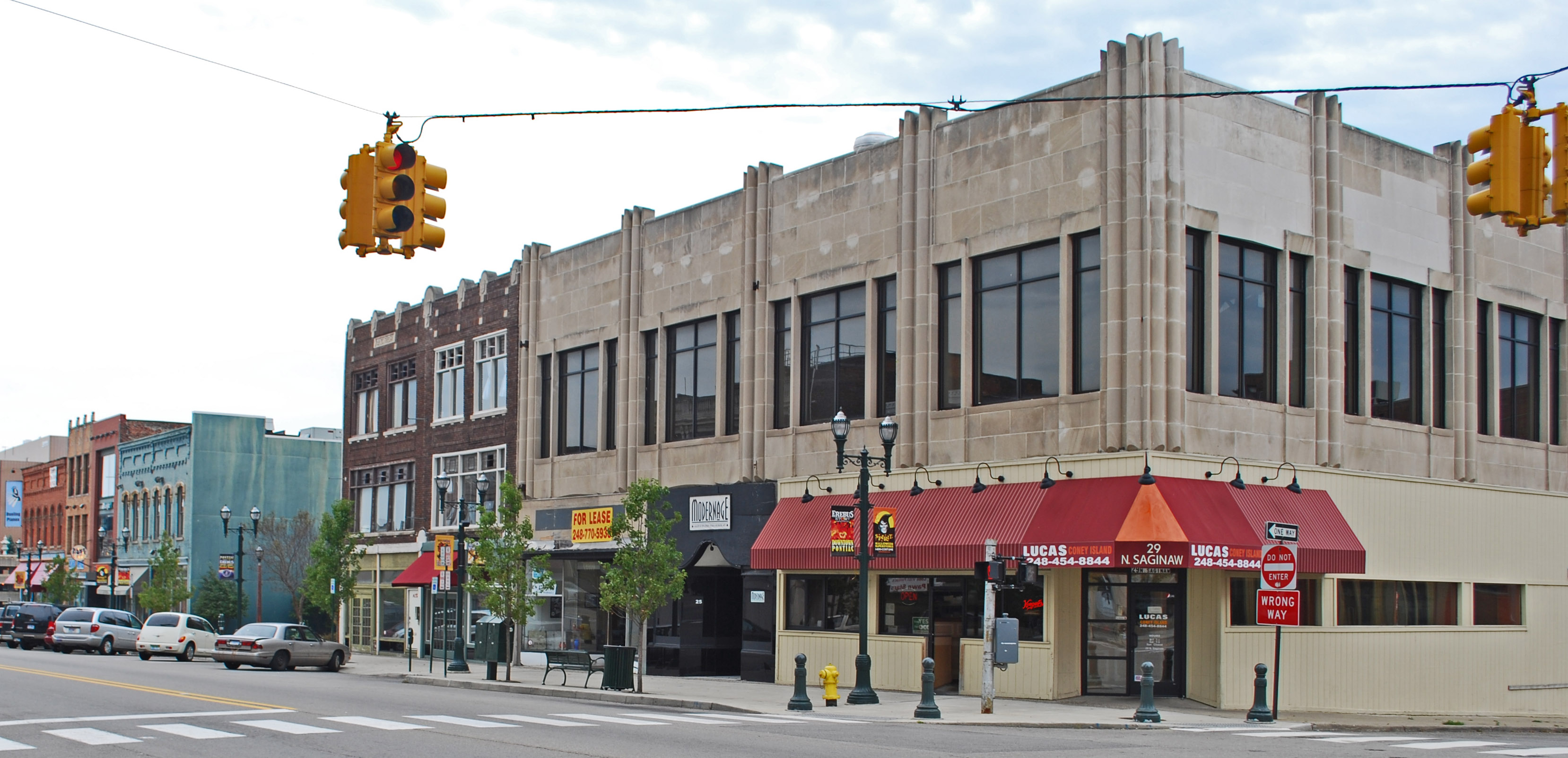
SW corner of Lawrence and Saginaw

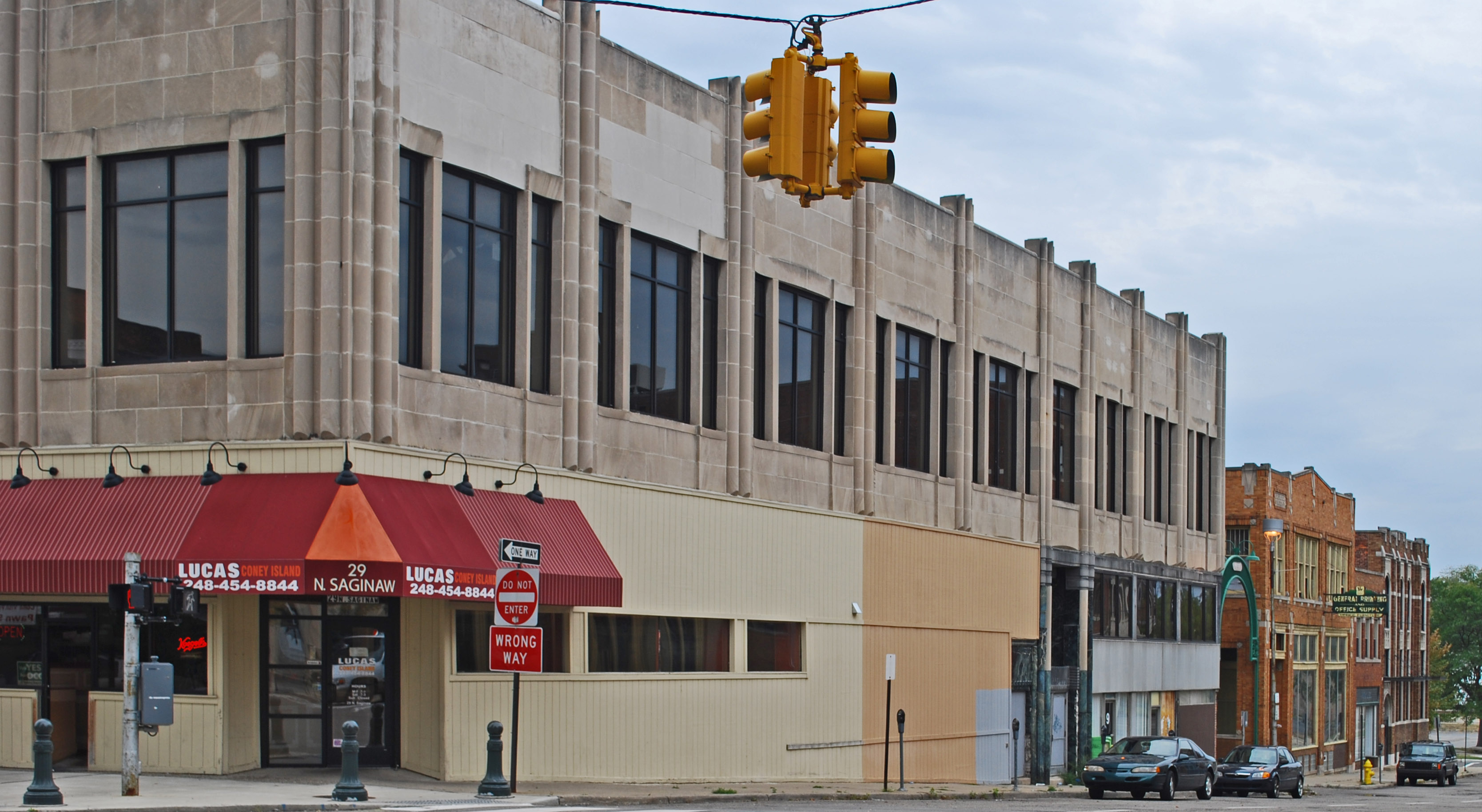
SW corner of Lawrence and Saginaw

== See also ==
- National Register of Historic Places listings in Oakland County, Michigan
