= Grinnell Brothers Music House =

- U.S. National Register of Historic Places
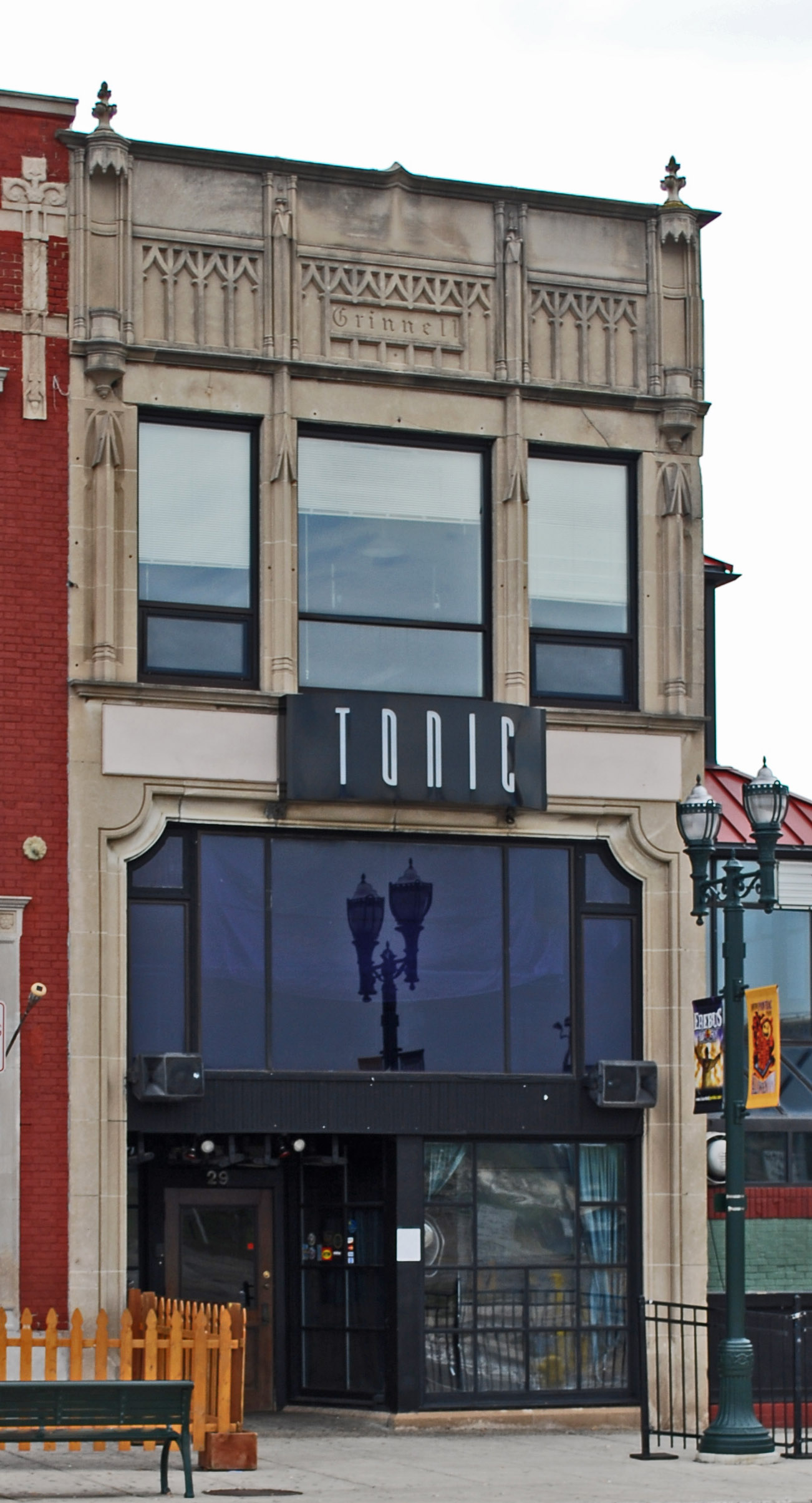
- Interactive map
- Location: 27 S. Saginaw St., Pontiac, Michigan
- Coordinates: 42°38′10″N 83°17′31″W
- Area: 0.1 acres (0.040 ha)
- Built: 1923
- Architect: Leo John Heenan
- Architectural style: Late Gothic Revival
- NRHP reference No.: 84001812
- Added to NRHP: April 19, 1984

The Grinnell Brothers Music House is a commercial building located at 27 South Saginaw Street in Pontiac, Michigan. It was listed on the National Register of Historic Places in 1984.

== History ==
In 1880, brothers Herbert B. Grinnell, Clayton A. Grinnell and Ira L. Grinnell started a music business in Ann Arbor, Michigan. They moved the company to Ypsilanti in 1882, where they had success selling the Steinway brand and started manufacturing their own brand of pianos. By 1901, Grinnell Brothers was one of Michigan's largest piano and general music dealers, and the company began opening retail outlets in other cities in Michigan. Eventually, it had 43 retail stores in Michigan; Windsor, Ontario; and Toledo, Ohio. In 1905, they moved to Woodward Avenue in Detroit, and in 1915 they built their headquarters two miles north on Woodward Avenue. They opened an outlet in Pontiac in 1907. The original Pontiac building was destroyed by fire, and in 1923, the company constructed this building to replace it. The company hired architect Leo John Heenan, a former employee of both Albert Kahn and Smith, Hinchman and Grylls, to design the building.

By 1960, they were the largest music company in the world and the largest retail outlet for Steinway pianos.

The Grinnell Brothers store in Pontiac eventually closed, and the building was converted into a nightclub. The nightclub closed in 2014.

== Description ==
The Grinnell Brothers Music store in Pontiac is a three-story Gothic Revival commercial structure, measuring 20 feet in width and 140 feet in length. It was constructed to be fireproof, with a steel frame and concrete floors. The front facade is made entirely of stone, and contains many detailed decorative elements. It is three bays wide, with the bays separated by pilasters on the third floor level. The storefront opening on the first floor spans nearly the entire width of the building. "Grinnell Bros. Music House" is carved into the stone facade above the storefront.

== See also ==
- National Register of Historic Places listings in Oakland County, Michigan
