= Aldrich House =

Aldrich House may refer to following houses on the United States National Register of Historic Places (NRHP):

- Aaron Aldrich House, Bay Village, Ohio
- Jacob Aldrich House, Uxbridge, Massachusetts
- Nathan C. Aldrich House and Resthaven Chapel, Mendon, Massachusetts
- Nelson W. Aldrich House, Providence, Rhode Island
- Royal Aldrich House, Farmington Hills, Michigan
- Seth Aldrich House, Uxbridge, Massachusetts
- W. Aldrich House, Uxbridge, Massachusetts

== See also ==
- Aldrich–Genella House, New Orleans, Louisiana, on the NRHP
- Hazen-Kimball-Aldrich House, Georgetown, Massachusetts, on the NRHP
- Aldrich Mansion, Warwick, Rhode Island, United States, on the NRHP
