= Lynnfield High School =

Location
- 275 Essex Street; Lynnfield, Massachusetts 01940; United States
- Coordinates: 42°32′20″N 71°1′58″W

Information
- Type: Public, Coeducational
- Status: Open
- School district: Lynnfield Public Schools
- Principal: Patricia Puglisi
- Teaching staff: 48.66 (FTE)
- Grades: 9–12
- Enrollment: 571 (2023-2024)
- Student to teacher ratio: 11.73
- Colors: Blue and Gold
- Athletics conference: Cape Ann League
- Mascot: Pioneer
- Nickname: Pios
- Team name: Lynnfield Pioneers
- Accreditation: New England Association of Schools and Colleges
- Newspaper: The Catalyst
- Communities served: Lynnfield, Massachusetts
- Website: https://lhs.lynnfield.k12.ma.us/en-US

Lynnfield High School is a four-year, coeducational public high school for students in grades nine through twelve residing in the town of Lynnfield, Massachusetts, United States.

== Athletics ==
Lynnfield High School is a member of the Cape Ann League and is a Division III competitor in the Massachusetts Interscholastic Athletic Association. Sports teams are known as the Pioneers and the school colors are blue and gold. Lynnfield High offers sports in the fall, winter, and spring seasons.

- Fall Sports
  - Football
  - Golf
  - Soccer (boys & girls)
  - Field Hockey
  - Volleyball
  - Cross Country (boys & girls)
  - Cheerleading
- Winter Sports
  - Basketball (boys & girls)
  - Ice Hockey (boys & girls)
  - Wrestling
  - Indoor Track (boys & girls)
  - Gymnastics
  - Swimming (Co-Ed)
- Spring Sports
  - Baseball
  - Softball
  - Tennis (boys & girls)
  - Track & Field (boys & girls)
  - Lacrosse (boys & girls)

== Arts and activities ==
Lynnfield High School has many notable art and music programs, as well as clubs and extracurricular activities. Every fall, a Club Fair is held during school, organized by student representatives from different activities to inform and encourage freshmen to participate and get involved. Some of Lynnfield's clubs and activities include:

- Best Buddies
- Math Team
- Mock Trial
- The Catalyst (Student Newspaper)
- Dance Club
- Debate Team
- Habitat for Humanity
- Concert Choir
  - Men's Chorus and Women's Chorus
- Stocks and Trades Club
- Pickleball Club
- Yearbook Club
- Interact Club
- Environmental Awareness Club
- Chess Club
- Lynnfield Media
- A Healthy Lynnfield
- Asian Students Alliance
- Tri-M Music Honor Society

Theatre East is Lynnfield High School's drama company. The company performs a 40-minute play each winter as a long-time participant of the METG (Massachusetts Educational Theater Guild)'s High School division Dramafest.

== Graduation requirements ==
To graduate from Lynnfield High School, students must earn 108 credits and meet the following departmental and community service requirements:

Department	Required Courses
English	English 9, 10, 11, 12 (including Research Paper in grade 11)
Mathematics	Four full-year math courses
Science	Three full-year science courses
Social Studies	Modern World History, U.S. History I, U.S. History II
Unified Arts	One semester course
Business/Technology	One semester course
Physical Education/Health	PE 9/Health, PE 10, PE 11, PE 12
Community Service	35 hours (20 hours to be completed by the end of grade 10; an additional 15 hours to be completed by the end of semester one of the senior year)

Students must be scheduled for a minimum of 27.5 credits (or the equivalent) per school year. At least one-semester elective is required of all students.

== Notable alumni ==
- Scott Curtis, former American football linebacker who played in the National Football League
- Dan Andelman is a co host of Phantom Gourmet. A co owner of the Mendon Twin Drive-In & son of famous sports radio personality Eddie Andelman.
- Dennis Kenney, American actor, singer, and dancer
- Richard Tisei, American politician and realtor
- Bob Tufts, American professional baseball player who was a pitcher in Major League Baseball (MLB)
- Danielle DiLorenzo Nath, Two-time Survivor contestant (Panama, Heroes vs Villains).
