= Skyfari =

Skyfari is the name of aerial tramway/gondola lifts at multiple zoos in the United States:

- Bronx Zoo
- Henry Doorly Zoo and Aquarium
- San Diego Zoo
- Southwick's Zoo
