= Phantom Gourmet =

Food-related television program

The Phantom Gourmet is a food-related television program featuring profiles of New England area restaurants. The show airs on WSBK-TV in Boston, Massachusetts, WNAC-DT2 in Providence, Rhode Island, and WPXT in Portland, Maine each Saturday and Sunday morning, with an hour episode composed of older clips followed by an hour-long episode (either new or rerun). While the original format featured reviews by the "Phantom Critic" and numerical ratings of the restaurants, the reviews and numerical ratings have been discontinued. The show continues to feature local restaurants but focuses on describing dishes and profiling chefs and owners. In late spring of 2006, the company behind the show came out with its first Boston restaurant guide, entitled The Phantom Gourmet Guide to Boston's Best Restaurants.

== Show format ==
In addition to restaurant profiles, the show features interviews with restaurant owners and chefs, a segment on determining the best grocery item of a chosen category(Top of the Food Chain), and a segment on recipes. The show also gives a Great 8 selection of restaurants that are the best in their category, and a Hidden Jewel that features a unique restaurant that people may not have heard of. At the end of each show, a Dish Worth Driving To award is awarded, which is a restaurant in the outlying areas of the Metro Boston area (though sometimes as far away as Rhode Island or New Hampshire).

When the show was still assigning numerical ratings to restaurants, the rating was based on ten criteria: atmosphere, menu, appetizers, entrees, desserts, portion sizes, service, cleanliness, value, and location. Each element was rated 1 - 10, leading to final rankings of:

- Phan-tastic Dining (~90-100)
- Gourmet Greatness (~80-90)
- Phantom Approved (~75-80)
- Phantom Mezza Mezza (~65-75)
- Phantom Flawed (~65 and below)

== History ==
The program broadcast its first episode on June 26, 1993, on New England Cable News with host Steve Martorano. The show gained a cult following almost immediately and was given a Best of Boston award by Boston Magazine in 1994 for Best Talk Show. NECN broadcast the show for a decade.

In March 2003, the Phantom Gourmet made a deal with Viacom to move the show to WSBK-TV beginning on September 20, 2003, where it has been since. During the transition, the original host, Billy Costa began a new show, TV Diner. The deal also led to the "Restaurant Report Card" segment of the show to appear on sister station WBZ-TV's newscasts. The show was also added to WLWC's programming schedule, bringing the show to the Providence, Rhode Island area, where NECN had been largely unavailable.

The Phantom Gourmet was suspended on June 14, 2020 following social media comments made by host Dave Andelman that mocked the George Floyd protests. The show returned to WSBK-TV on August 29, 2020.

== The Andelmans ==
When Phantom Gourmet moved to broadcast television in 2003, CEO David (Dave) Andelman, who also was the show's second host on NECN, tapped WBZ-TV news reporter David Robichaud to serve as host (2003–2005) before turning the job over to his own younger brother, Feedback Forum segment host Dan Andelman, who then became the show's full-time and current host. Dave Andelman continues to run the company while also appearing as an unseen narrator during the restaurant segments and frequent on-air contributor. During special theme shows (usually ones that discuss more popular fare like chain restaurants and fast food), the two Andelman brothers are sometimes joined in a panel by other brother Michael. Their father, Eddie, known for his annual "Hot Dog Safari" charity event, has also been featured on the show as an expert on hot dogs. Dave Andelman appeared on an episode of Throwdown! with Bobby Flay as one of the local judges for a meatloaf throwdown which took place on Cape Cod.

In June 2020, Dave Andelman posted a series of social media posts that appeared to show opposition to Black Lives Matter as well as dismissing the seriousness of the COVID-19 pandemic. After WBZ, the station that airs The Phantom Gourmet, received a large number of complaints, Dave Andelman apologized for his posts spanning the last ten days. On Sunday, June 14, WBZ announced that it was suspending broadcasts of The Phantom Gourmet indefinitely. Andelman resigned as CEO of Phantom Gourmet on June 16.

== Other versions ==
=== Radio ===
In 2008, the Phantom Gourmet discontinued the radio segments that aired on WBZ each morning at 10:56 and each weekend afternoon at 2:56 and 3:56. This version had been on the air since 1995, and usually consisted of an audio version of a Restaurant Report Card, although at times a Great 8 segment appeared on the station. (As a result of corporate mergers, WBZ radio is now co-owned with WSBK-TV, and was formerly co-owned with WLWC as well.) A "Phantom Gourmet" radio show debuted on April 7, 2007, on Boston's WTKK (96.9 FM). It aired on Fridays from 10AM-1PM with a replay on Saturdays from 4PM-7PM local time. This program left the air when WTKK changed to a music format in January 2013.

=== In print and online ===
The Phantom's report cards also appear in print in the Boston Herald Friday editions, and online at the Phantom Gourmet's website after each episode airs. The website also contains web versions of the Great 8, Top of the Food Chain, and Hidden Jewel segments of the television program.

== The critic ==
The term Phantom Gourmet is also used to describe the critic who reviews each of the above programs. According to the website, the Phantom "pays his own way" and dines under a disguise to give the most trustworthy restaurant reviews the company can possibly give to their viewers. This is done because the producers believe that recognizable critics are given special service above what average customers receive, whereas concealing the Phantom's identity allows him a more accurate representation of what other customers experience. To this end, the Phantom Gourmet staff refuse to disclose the Phantom's name to the general public. The only clues that have been given are that he doesn't live in Boston or Providence and it has been stated that the Phantom is not Andelman. On the June 3, 2006 show, host Dan Andelman conducted an interview with the Phantom, whose voice and identity were altered. They revealed that the Phantom's favorite food is pizza, and also that, despite the show's use of "he" to refer to the critic, the Phantom could still be a woman.

At some point prior to 2013, the Phantom critic and his reviews were removed from the television program's format. The show continues to feature local restaurants but focuses on describing dishes and profiling chefs and owners. Numerical ratings have been discontinued.

== Special events ==
Every fall, the Phantom Gourmet Food Festival is held near Fenway Park on Landsdowne Street. The Phantom's most critically acclaimed restaurants in Boston and the Greater Boston area serve various foods at the event. Due to alcohol served, the gala is a 21+ event.

On May 2, 2009 the company hosted a new event, The Phantom Gourmet Wine & Food Phest at the Bayside Expo Center. The tagline for the event, which featured 30 wines and 30 foods and a giant purple dance floor, was “wine snobs need not apply.”

Andelman and his brothers have also taken over the longtime hot dog fundraiser that their father, sports radio talk show host Eddie Andelman, had hosted for the last 19 years. The renamed Phantom Gourmet Hot Dog Safari was held on May 31, 2009, at Suffolk Downs. All proceeds went to the Joey Fund and Cystic Fibrosis Foundation.

The Phantom Gourmet BBQ Beach Party has changed its name because they changed its focus to include music. The 2014 Phantom Gourmet BBQ & Music Festival was headlined by The Mighty Mighty Bosstones and took place over three days on Boston's City Hall Plaza.
