= Mendon Center Historic District =

Historic district in Massachusetts, United States

- U.S. National Register of Historic Places
- U.S. Historic district
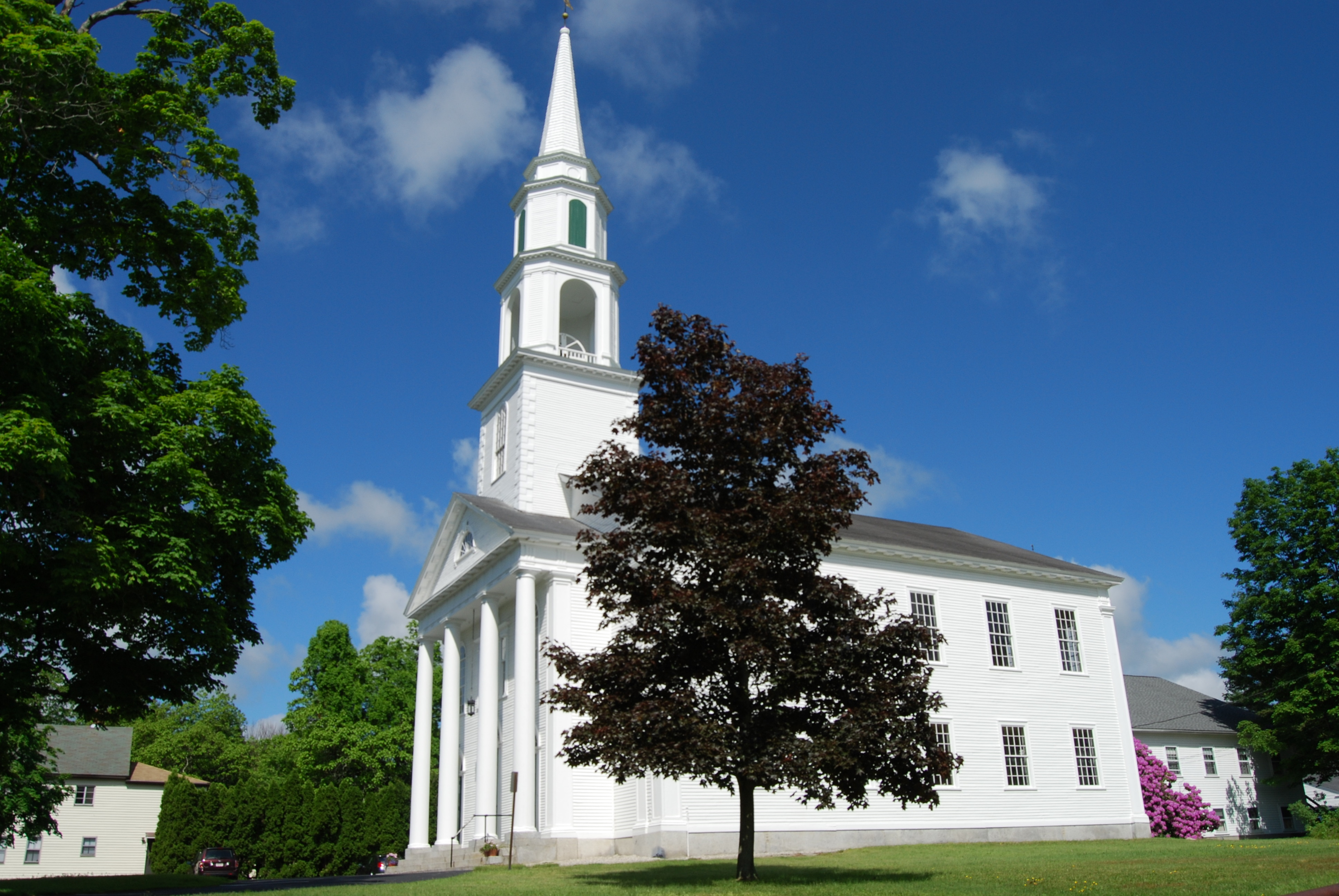

- Location within Massachusetts Location within the United States
- Location: Mendon, Massachusetts
- Coordinates: 42°6′19.3″N 71°33′14.0″W
- Area: 400 acres (160 ha)
- Built: 1740
- Architect: Carter, Elias; Metcalf, James Edward, Jr.
- Architectural style: Colonial, Federal
- NRHP reference No.: 03000552
- Added to NRHP: June 19, 2003

The Mendon Center Historic District is a historic district encompassing the village center of Mendon, Massachusetts, and some of its surrounding rural areas. It is roughly bounded by Main, Hastings, Maple, North, Washington & George Streets. The village is centered on the triangle defined by Main, Hastings, and Maple Streets, with dwellings built up on the roads that radiate away from this area. Founders' Park, located at the junction of Main, Hastings, North and Milford Streets, is the site of the original town center, where the first meeting house was located. The district has residential buildings dating from the 18th to the mid-20th centuries, in a wide variety of styles. The focal point of the town center is the Second Unitarian Church, an 1820 building designed by Worcester architect Elias Carter.

The district was listed on the National Register of Historic Places in 2003.

== See also ==
- National Register of Historic Places listings in Worcester County, Massachusetts
