= Olney Cook Artisan Shop =

- U.S. National Register of Historic Places
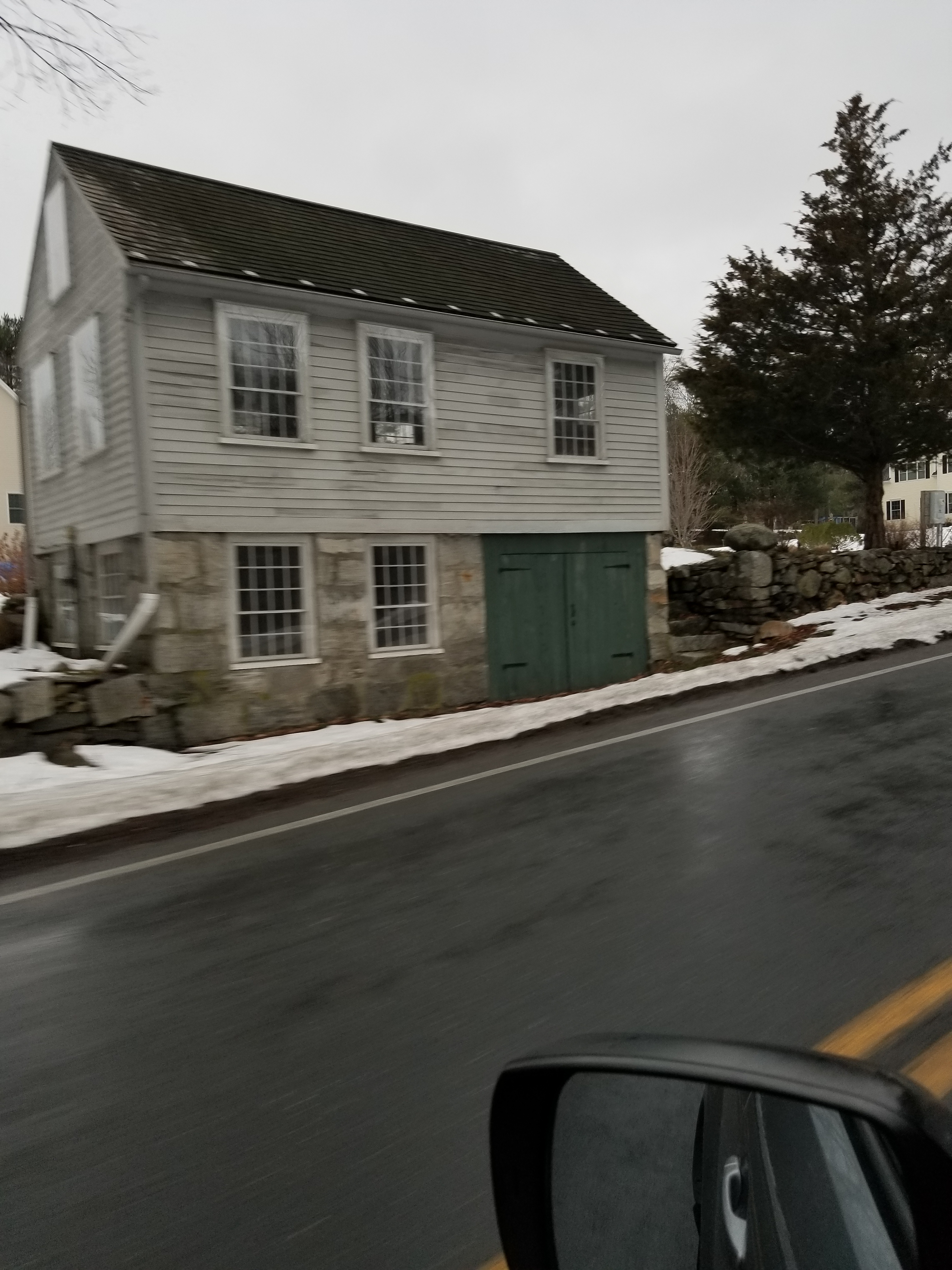

- Location within Massachusetts Location within the United States
- Location: 54 Hartford Ave. E., Mendon, Massachusetts
- Coordinates: 42°5′41″N 71°31′24″W
- Area: less than one acre
- Built: before 1839
- Built by: Probably Olney Cook
- NRHP reference No.: 100004699
- Added to NRHP: December 2, 2019

The Olney Cook Artisan Shop is a historic industrial building at 54 Hartford Avenue East in Mendon, Massachusetts. Built in the early 19th century, it is a rare surviving example of an industrial structure built for use in small-scale cottage industry from that period. It was listed on the National Register of Historic Places in 2019. It is now owned by the town.

== Description and history ==
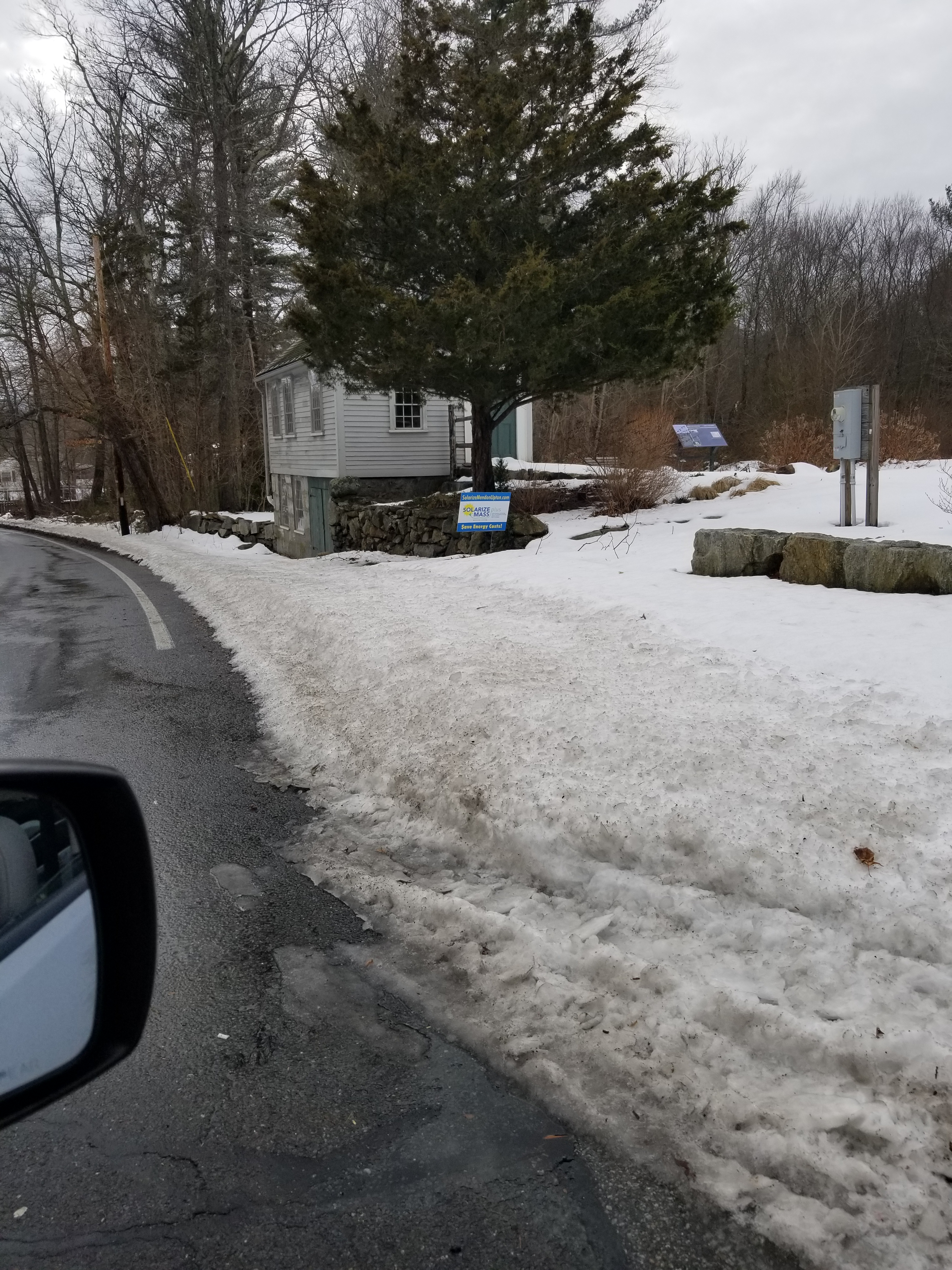
Olney Cook Artisan Shop

The Olney Cook Aartisan Shop stands in a rural residential area of eastern Mendon, on the north side of Hartford Avenue East a short way east of its junction with Bellingham Street. It is set close to the road. It is a functionally two-story structure, with an exposed stone basement level and a wood frame main level. It has a gabled roof and clapboarded exterior. The front facade has a two-panel garage door and sash windows in the granite basement walls, and three sash windows on the main level. The upper level entrance is on the right facade, accessed via stone steps.

What is now Hartford Avenue East was historically the main road connecting Mendon village with towns to the east. The area where this shop stands belonged to members of the Cook family, descends of Walter Cook, one of the town's early settlers. This modest industrial shop was built sometime before 1839, when it is mentioned in a deed transferring the land from Ariel Cook to his son Olney. Members of the Cook family are known to have engaged in the shoemaking trade in the early 19th century, and Olney Cook is listed in some records as a painter. Modest industrial shops of this scale and state of preservation are particularly rare today, despite the fact that they were fairly numerous in the years prior to the erection of large-scale industrial facilities.

The shop was deeded to the town in 2004; the associated Cook farmhouse and barn were demolished in the early 2000s.

== See also ==
- National Register of Historic Places listings in Worcester County, Massachusetts
