= North Avenue Rural Historic District =

Historic district in Massachusetts, United States

- U.S. National Register of Historic Places
- U.S. Historic district
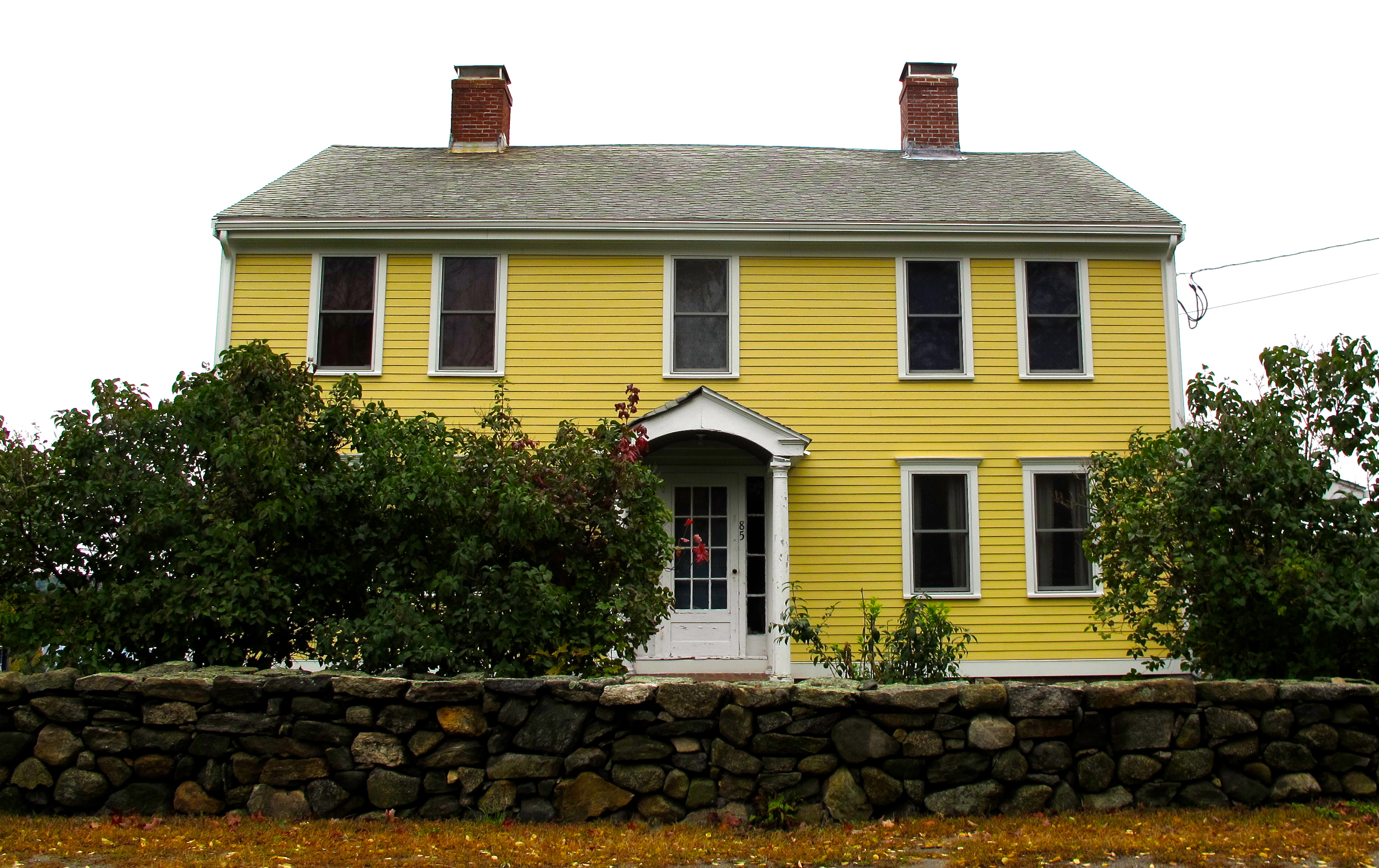
- 85 North Avenue

- Location within Massachusetts Location within the United States
- Location: Mendon, Massachusetts
- Coordinates: 42°7′34″N 71°34′1″W
- Area: 345 acres (140 ha)
- Architectural style: Federal, Greek Revival
- NRHP reference No.: 03000683
- Added to NRHP: July 25, 2003

The North Avenue Rural Historic District is a rural historic district in northern Mendon, Massachusetts. It covers 345 acres (140 ha), and extends predominantly along North Street, between Esty Road and Powers Road, and eastward along Hopedale Street and Trask Road. The area has been a rural agricultural area since the early days of Mendon's history in the 17th century. The present landscape retains boundaries and land-use patterns that were established in the 18th and 19th centuries, although some features (generally within individual farms) have been lost or obscured to accommodate modern farming practices. The architecture of the area is predominantly 19th century; the oldest building in the district appears to be the Federal style house of the Seth Davenport Farm at 133 North Avenue, built c. 1780.

The district was added to the National Register of Historic Places in 2003.

== See also ==
- National Register of Historic Places listings in Worcester County, Massachusetts
