= Scott Curtis (American football) =

American football player (born 1964)

No. 91, 58
- Position: Linebacker

Personal information
- Born: December 26, 1964 (age 61); Burlington, Vermont, U.S.
- Listed height: 6 ft 1 in (1.85 m)
- Listed weight: 230 lb (104 kg)

Career information
- High school: Lynnfield
- College: New Hampshire
- NFL draft: 1988: undrafted

Career history
- Philadelphia Eagles (1988); Denver Broncos (1989–1990); San Francisco 49ers (1992)*
- * Offseason or practice squad member only

Career NFL statistics
- Games played: 41
- Games started: 1
- Stats at Pro Football Reference

Alston Scott Curtis (born December 26, 1964) is an American former professional football player who was a linebacker in the National Football League (NFL) for three seasons. He played college football for the New Hampshire Wildcats.

== Professional career ==
Curtis signed with the Philadelphia Eagles as an undrafted free agent following the 1988 NFL draft. He saw the field in all 16 games that season. He played the next two seasons with the Denver Broncos, seeing action in 25 games and starting in one. Curtis played in Super Bowl XXIV against the San Francisco 49ers.
