= Mendon Airport =

- IATA: none; ICAO: none

Summary
- Operator: Private
- Location: Mendon, Massachusetts
- Built: Unknown
- In use: Before 1927-Before 1955
- Occupants: Private
- Elevation AMSL: 431 ft / 131 m
- Coordinates: 42°6′4.14″N 71°33′25.68″W
- Interactive map of Mendon Airport

Mendon Airport was an airfield operational in the mid-20th century in Mendon, Massachusetts. The airfield was located in the center of Mendon.

== 1938 Hurricane ==
During the 1938 New England Hurricane, one of the hangars at Mendon Airport collapsed, damaging two airplanes.
