= Dan Andelman =

American television personality (born 1975)

Daniel Jacob Andelman (born May 8, 1975) is one of the hosts of the WSBK-TV 38 show The Phantom Gourmet, and a previous host of the WTKK Radio 96 radio show Phantom Gourmet.

== Career ==
The Andelman brothers took over the Phantom Gourmet hosting duties from David Robichaud, who left the show in their hands. Andelman took over as CEO when his brother Dave was ousted from his ownership role in 2020, due to his negative comments on the Black Lives Matter protests.

With his brothers, Andelman owns the Mendon Twin Drive-In in Mendon, Massachusetts.

He appeared as one of the judges on the "Sticky Buns" episode of Throwdown! with Bobby Flay, which took place at the Cambridge location of Flour.

== Personal life ==
Andelman is a son of greater Boston sports radio personality Eddie Andelman.
