= Seth Aldrich House =

Historic house in Massachusetts, United States

- S. Aldrich House
- U.S. National Register of Historic Places
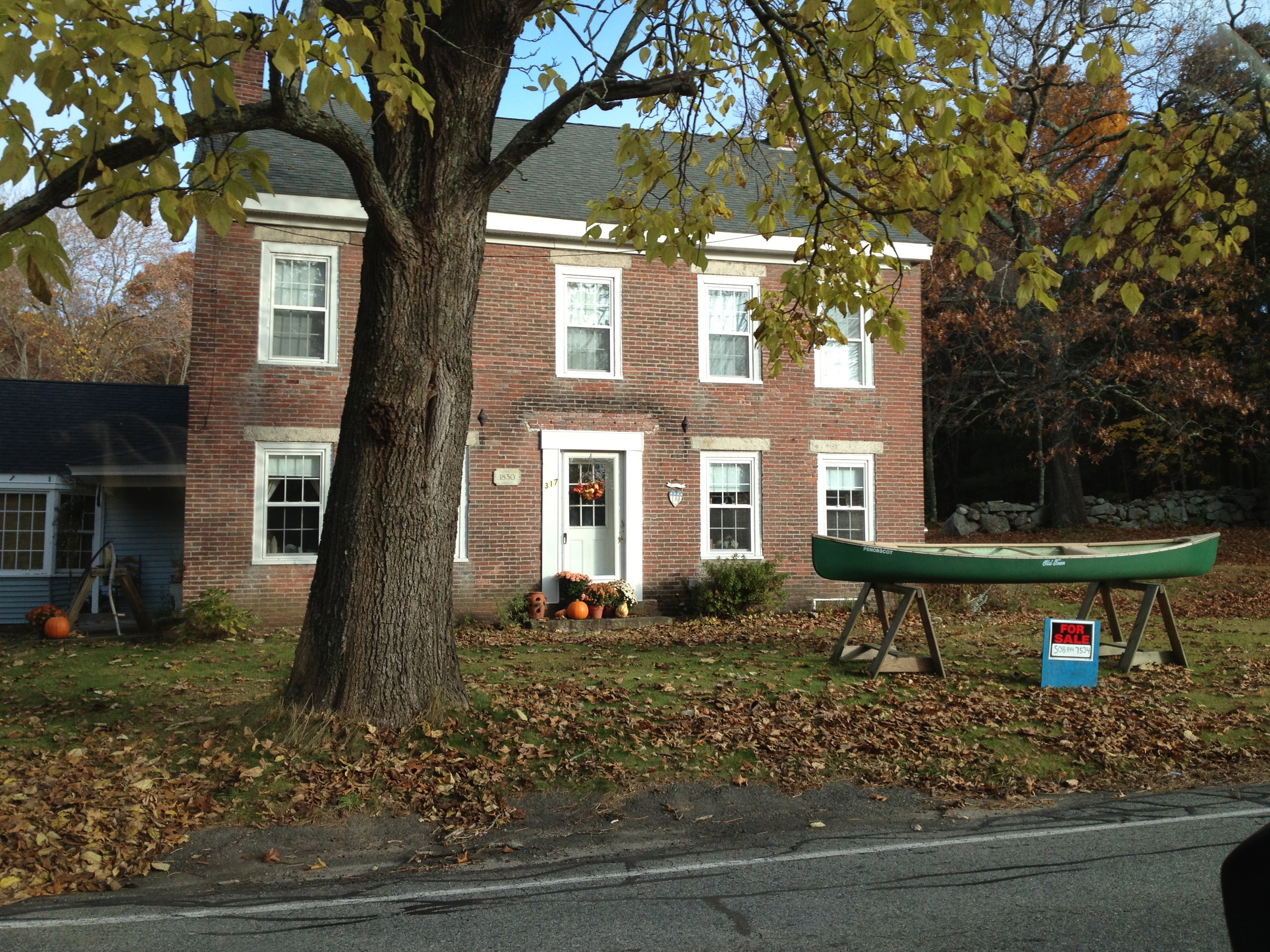

- Location within Massachusetts Location within the United States
- Location: Uxbridge, Massachusetts
- Coordinates: 42°1′44″N 71°38′17″W
- Built: 1830
- Architectural style: Federal
- MPS: Uxbridge MRA
- NRHP reference No.: 83004104
- Added to NRHP: October 7, 1983

The Seth Aldrich House or S. Aldrich House is an historic house located at 317 Aldrich Street, in Uxbridge, Massachusetts. On October 7, 1983, it was added to the National Register of Historic Places.

== History ==
The section where the house is located is also known as "Aldrich Village". There is an historic Quaker Meeting House here, known as "The Old Brick", among other local historic sites. The Town of Uxbridge was first settled in 1662. The Aldrich Family of Mendon and Uxbridge, became a political force in American politics. The original ancestor was George Aldrich of Mendon, who may have been buried near the Seth Aldrich Home, in the family cemetery. Senator Nelson Aldrich, an Aldrich family descendant from Rhode Island, set up the banking industry and finance system in the U.S. Former Vice President, Nelson Aldrich Rockefeller, was named for his mother's father, U.S. Senator Nelson Aldrich. Other Aldriches in political service included, William Aldrich, Richard S. Aldrich, and J. Frank Aldrich. There are a number of Aldrich homes along Aldrich Street, and Glendale Street in the south Uxbridge section of Uxbridge. The area generally is also often referred to as Ironstone, Massachusetts.

In the 1820–30s, nearby Aldrich Village sprang up as a community of the extended family of the Aldriches. The Aldrich family were Quakers and their community included their homes, businesses including the Jacob Aldrich Farm (and Orchard) at 389 Aldrich Street which is a light colored brick home made in a kiln nearby on River Road. 364 Aldrich Street was owned by Daniel Aldrich who ran a saw mill, a blacksmith shop and a wheelwright shop which produced numerous products such as roof shingles, wagons, and lumber. A one-room schoolhouse was in the community as was an ice house cutting and storing ice from Aldrich Pond. 317 Aldrich Street was the home of Seth Aldrich and the family cemetery `is on Glendale Street, near the border with Burrillville, Rhode Island.

== See also ==
- National Register of Historic Places listings in Uxbridge, Massachusetts
- Jacob Aldrich House
- Ironstone Mill Housing and Cellar Hole
- Friends Meetinghouse (Uxbridge, Massachusetts)
