= Nathan C. Aldrich House and Resthaven Chapel =

Historic church in Massachusetts, United States

- U.S. National Register of Historic Places
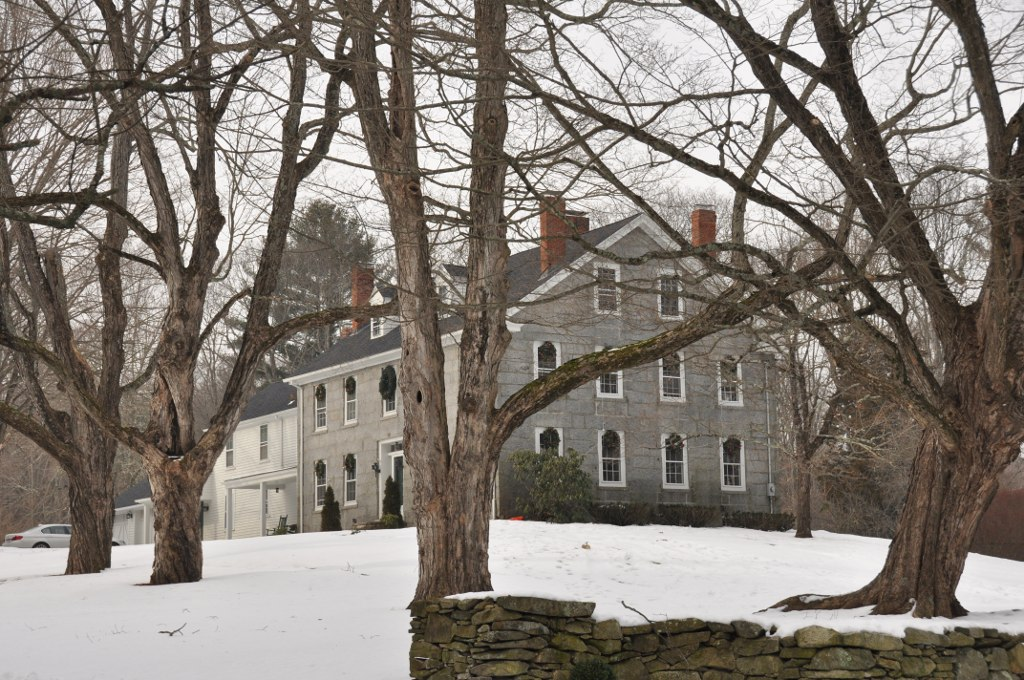

- Location within Massachusetts Location within the United States
- Location: 111 Providence St., Mendon, Massachusetts
- Coordinates: 42°5′13″N 71°31′57″W
- Area: 4.9 acres (2.0 ha)
- Built: c. 1830
- Architect: Parker, Gurdon Saltonstall; Phillips, Wendell
- Architectural style: Greek Revival, Late Gothic Revival
- NRHP reference No.: 06000399
- Added to NRHP: May 17, 2006

The Nathan C. Aldrich House and Resthaven Chapel are a historic house and chapel at 111 Providence Street in Mendon, Massachusetts. The house, built c. 1830, is an example of Greek Revival architecture in stone, while the chapel is a Late Gothic structure completed in 1900. The property was listed on the National Register of Historic Places in 2006.

== Description and history ==
The Nathan C. Aldrich House is located in a rural-residential area southeast of the center of Mendon, on the west side of Providence Street just south of its crossing of Spring Brook. It is a two-story masonry structure, built out of locally quarried granite that has been formed into dressed blocks. It is capped by a gabled roof, and has a series of ells that telescope in size. Its main facade faces south, and is five bays wide, with a transomed entrance at the center. The interior has retained a significant number of original finishes, despite its adaptation for institutional use. The chapel, also built of stone, is located near the rear of the property, overlooking Spring Brook.

The date of construction of Nathan Aldrich's stone house is not known; it is estimated to have been built c. 1830 based on its Greek Revival details. Stone farmhouses of the period are rare in Mendon, and are predominantly associated with Quakers like Aldrich. The property was acquired in 1891 by Catherine Regina Seabury, who established a rural retreat for women on the property, including the construction of a chapel on the grounds in 1899–1900. The retreat was transformed into a boarding school in 1912, but it did not survive Seabury's death in 1929. The next owner, Doctor Joseph Ashkins, transformed the property into a country estate, removing many of the trappings and alterations made to accommodate the institutional needs.

== See also ==
- National Register of Historic Places listings in Worcester County, Massachusetts
