= Eddie Andelman =

American sports radio talk show host (1937–2026)

Eddie Andelman

Eddie Andelman (December 3, 1936 – June 15, 2026) was an American sports radio talk-show host. He worked for more than 40 years in sports talk radio in Boston and appeared on more than 100 sports stations throughout the United States.

== Early life and education ==
Andelman was born in the Boston neighborhood of Dorchester in December 1936. He was raised in Brookline. He graduated from Brookline High School in 1954. Andelman graduated from Boston University and earned an MBA from Northeastern University. Before starting his career in radio with WBZ in 1969, he ran his family's real estate development business.

== Career ==
Andelman's career in sports talk radio began in June 1969 on suburban station WUNR. His show Sports Huddle then moved to Boston's WBZ later that year. Airing on Sundays from 7–10 p.m., the show also featured Jim McCarthy and Mark Witkin. Andelman remained at WBZ until mid-1971, when he and the show moved to WEEI. He began a television program for WNAC, now WHDH, Channel 7 in November 1972, which lasted until early 1976. He also appeared as a host on WCVB Channel 5.

Andelman's Sports Huddle show moved to WTKK and lasted for many years until December 26, 2010.

== Personal life and death ==
Andelman's son David created the Phantom Gourmet restaurant-review television show. His other sons, including Dan Andelman, also hosted the show.

Andelman and his wife Judith, whom he often called "the fabulous Judy" on his Sports Huddle talk show, lived in West Palm Beach, Florida. They were made honorary goodwill ambassadors by the Aruba Tourism Authority after having visited the island 53 times over 35 years.

He was also known for hosting the Hot Dog Safari for the Cystic Fibrosis Foundation, raising in excess of $5 million.

Andelman died unexpectedly on June 15, 2026, at the age of 89.

== Charitable work ==
Andelman was involved with many charitable organizations, but was best known in the New England area for his Hot Dog Safari, which he hosted beginning in 1990. The event raised money for the Joey Fund and the Cystic Fibrosis Foundation.

== WEEI ==
Andelman worked at WEEI for ten years until his abrupt departure in December 2001. Reports described him as unhappy with the direction that the station had taken toward more confrontational shows such as The Dennis and Callahan Show and The Big Show. He was also said to be unhappy when the station paired him with cohost Dale Arnold for the A-Team show. Although Arnold denied any personal problems with Andelman, some reports indicated that the men disliked each other. WEEI replaced Andelman with former television sportscaster Bob Neumeier.

=== Comments about WEEI ===
Regarding the state of sports radio, including WEEI, Andelman observed:

"I’ve been planning this show at WTKK for almost two years. Radio should be a theater of the mind, not screaming and stupidity. ... WEEI has too many people who are not trained and not educated. They pay players and coaches to be on their shows. Then they have to watch what questions they ask. I won't pay guests. Sports radio has become public relations. Everyone kisses ass."

Andelman pledged to start a movement called Fans Against Idiot Radio, or FAIR, as an antidote to "venomous" WEEI.

== WWZN (WMEX) ==
In early 2002, Andelman joined WWZN, a direct competitor to WEEI in Boston, which also featured former Red Sox play-by-play announcer Sean McDonough and Ryen Russillo. The station also acquired the rights to broadcast Boston Celtics games for five years. WWZN eventually sold its Celtics rights to WRKO and replaced all local broadcasts in October 2005 with a nationally syndicated lineup.
