= Hazen-Kimball-Aldrich House =

Historic house in Massachusetts, United States

- U.S. National Register of Historic Places
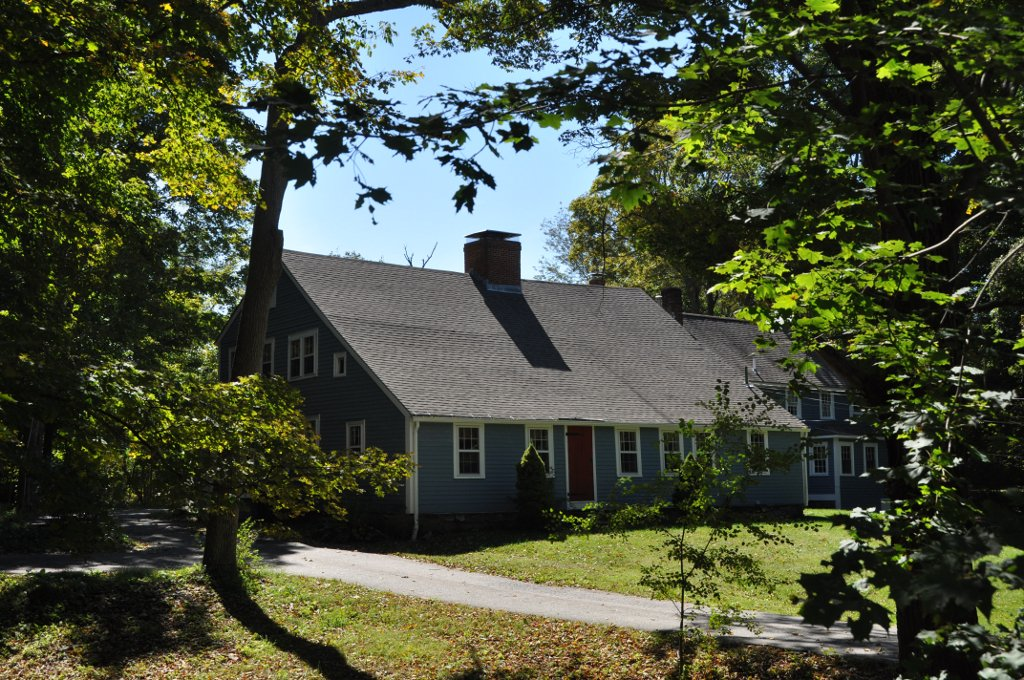

- Location within Massachusetts Location within the United States
- Location: 225 E. Main Street, Georgetown, Massachusetts
- Coordinates: 42°42′59″N 70°58′32″W
- Built: 1710
- Architectural style: Colonial
- MPS: First Period Buildings of Eastern Massachusetts TR
- NRHP reference No.: 90000209
- Added to NRHP: March 9, 1990

The Hazen-Kimball-Aldrich House is a historic First Period house in Georgetown, Massachusetts.

The Hazen House was built around the 1680s by Thomas and Mary Hazen. Thomas was born in Rowley, Mass. January 29, 1657 (son of Edward Hazen, first generation to migrate to America from Lincolnshire, England) and Mary Howlett born in Ipswich, Mass. around 1664. Thomas and Mary moved from the house in 1710–11, relocating to Norwich, Connecticut. The oldest part of the house is the central chimney and the rooms immediately to its right; the rooms to the chimney's left were built next (probably not long afterward), and the leanto section (which faces the street today) was added in the middle of the 18th century. In 1906 a barn was attached to the north side of the house and converted to living space.

The house was listed on the National Register of Historic Places in 1990.

== See also ==
- National Register of Historic Places listings in Essex County, Massachusetts
