= Royal Aldrich House =

- U.S. National Register of Historic Places
- Michigan State Historic Site
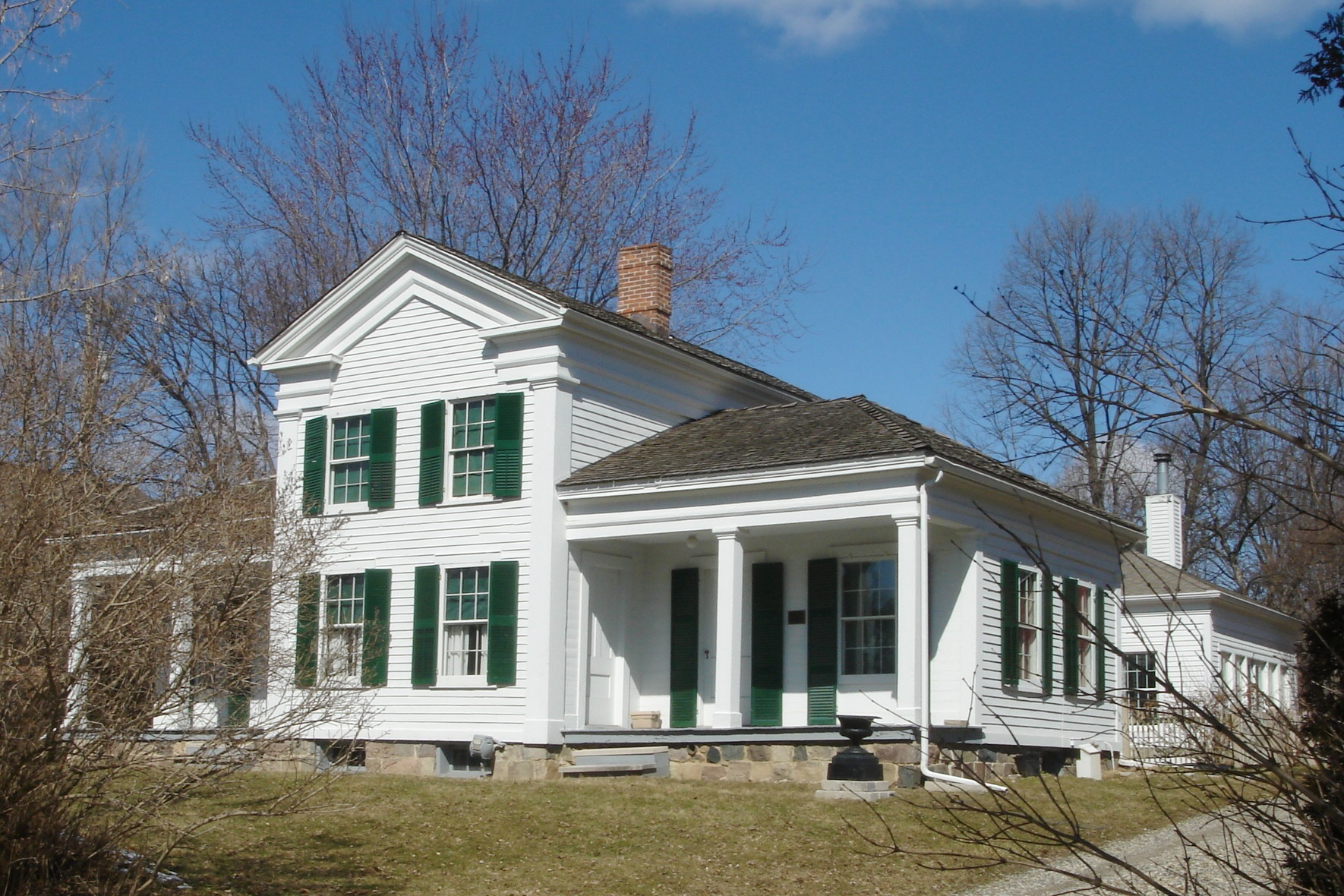
- Interactive map
- Location: 31110 W. 11 Mile Rd., Farmington Hills, Michigan
- Coordinates: 42°29′06″N 83°21′24″W
- Area: 1.3 acres (0.53 ha)
- Architectural style: Greek Revival
- NRHP reference No.: 94000755
- Added to NRHP: August 19, 1994

The Royal Aldrich House is a single-family house located at 31110 West 11 Mile Road in Farmington Hills, Michigan. It was listed on the National Register of Historic Places in 1994. It is one of a few remaining Greek Revival style houses in southeast Michigan still located on the site where built.

== History ==
In 1823, Esek Aldrich of Farmington, New York purchased this land. In 1839, Esek's 24-year-old son Royal moved from New York to Michigan to make a fresh start after the death of his wife and daughter. Shortly after his move, Royal married Betsey Janette Stevens, the daughter of a local farmer. The couple eventually had three children: Almeron, Bruce and Erin. In 1843, Royal constructed this Greek Revival farmhouse on his property.

Royal Aldrich died in 1856, passing the farm to his wife and children. In 1870, the farm was sold to Frederick Bade, a German immigrant. The Bade family owned the farm until the middle to the 20th century. In the post-World War II housing boom, the farm land was subdivided, and the house served as a duplex for a time.

== Description ==
The Royal Aldrich house is an upright-and-double wing Greek Revival of post-and-beam construction. It is covered with clapboard and sits on a fieldstone foundation. The upright section is a two-story front-gable structure with cornice returns and broad architrave and frieze bands. The flanking wings are single story, hip roof sections, both with porches on the front. The windows are six-over-six units; the original movable shutters are still installed.

The interior of the house includes a parlor, sitting room, dining room, bedroom, and kitchen on the ground floor, with the kitchen likely a c. 1880 addition. The second floor contains two more bedrooms. The interior is generally simple, with little decoration. Walls are plaster, and the floors are softwood tongue-and-groove planking. The stairs to the second floor are mahogany.

== See also ==
- National Register of Historic Places listings in Oakland County, Michigan
