= Aldrich–Genella House =

Historic house in New Orleans, Louisiana

- U.S. National Register of Historic Places
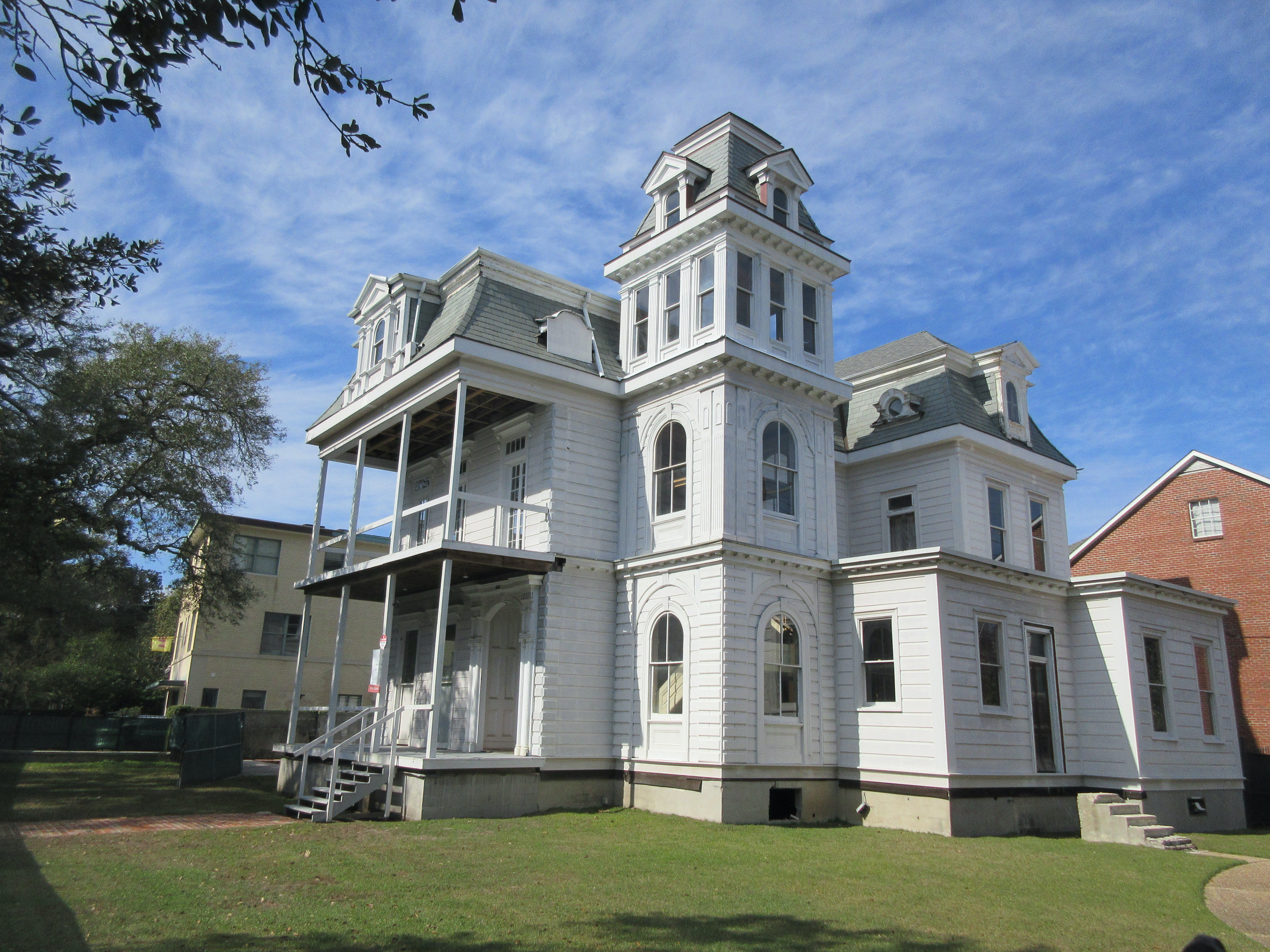

- Location within East New Orleans Location within Louisiana Location within the United States
- Location: 4801 St. Charles Avenue, New Orleans, Louisiana
- Coordinates: 29°55′35″N 90°6′24″W
- Area: 0.5 acres (0.20 ha)
- Built: 1866
- Architect: Wright, Thomas Brown
- Architectural style: Second Empire, Renaissance
- NRHP reference No.: 80001742
- Added to NRHP: October 08, 1980

The Aldrich–Genella House is a historic house located at 4801 St. Charles Avenue in New Orleans, Louisiana.

== Description and history ==
The 3 1/2-story house was built in 1866 and was designed by Thomas Brown Wright in the Second Empire style of architecture, which was nationally popular at the time. In 1878, it was renovated and fitted with elements of the Renaissance Revival style. It was added to the National Register of Historic Places on October 8, 1980.
