= Mendon Twin Drive-In =

Coordinates: 42°06′46″N 71°32′54″W

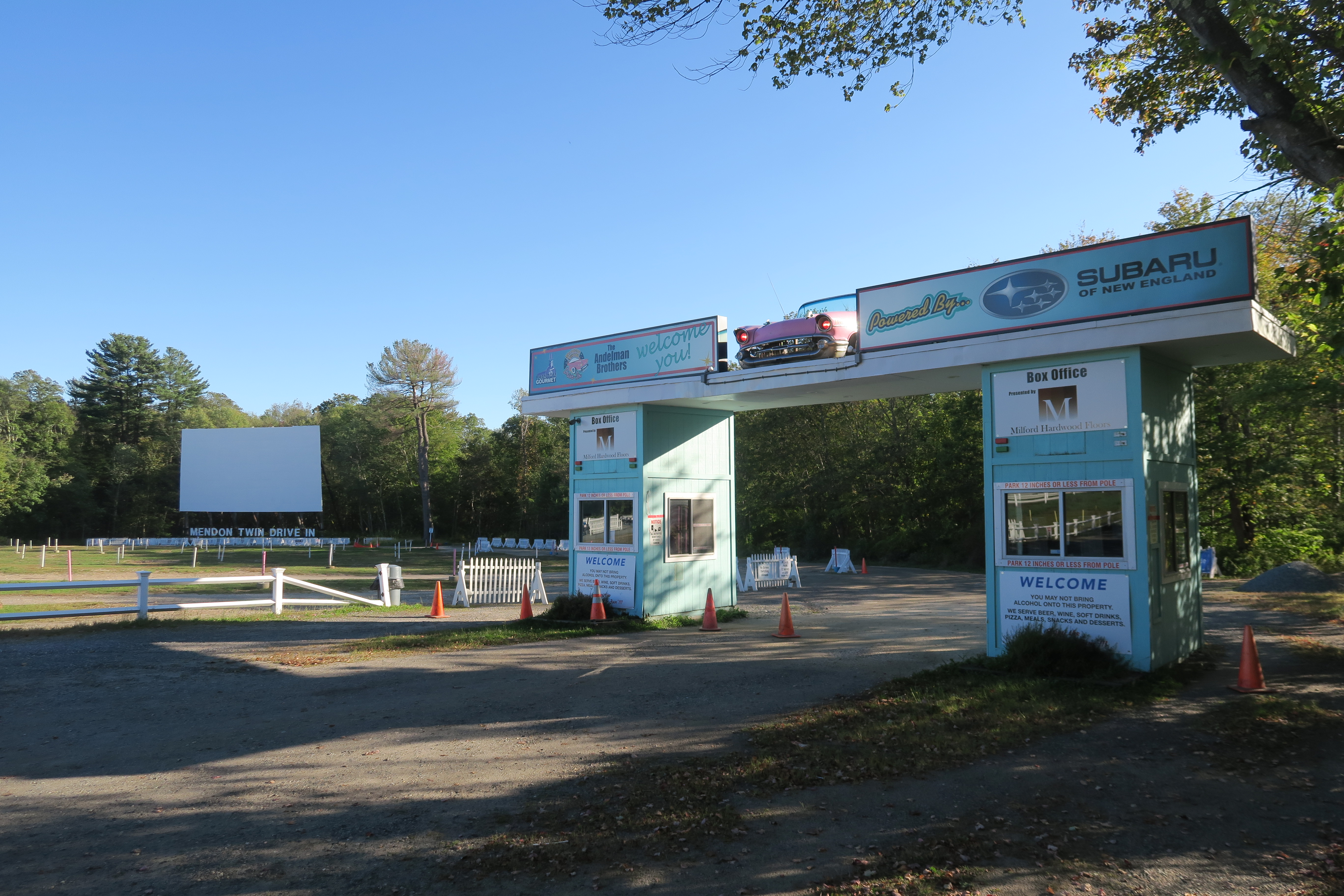
Mendon Twin Drive-In

The Mendon Twin Drive-In is a drive-in theater in Mendon, Massachusetts.

Opened on June 14, 1954, it is currently owned by Dan Andelman and his brothers Dave Andelman and Michael, who purchased the drive-in in March 2014 from Susan Swanson and Kathy Gorman, who had operated it since 1986. Dave was ousted from his ownership role in 2020 due to his negative comments on the Black Lives Matter protests. It can accommodate 800 cars. The second screen was added in 1998. Both screens broadcast movie soundtracks using FM radio signals; there are no remaining metal audio speakers on the poles.

As of 2015, it was one of three remaining drive-Ins in Massachusetts. The Andelmans have added a 5,000-square-foot outdoor patio where they offer beer and wine.
