= Southwick's Zoo =

Zoo in Massachusetts, United States

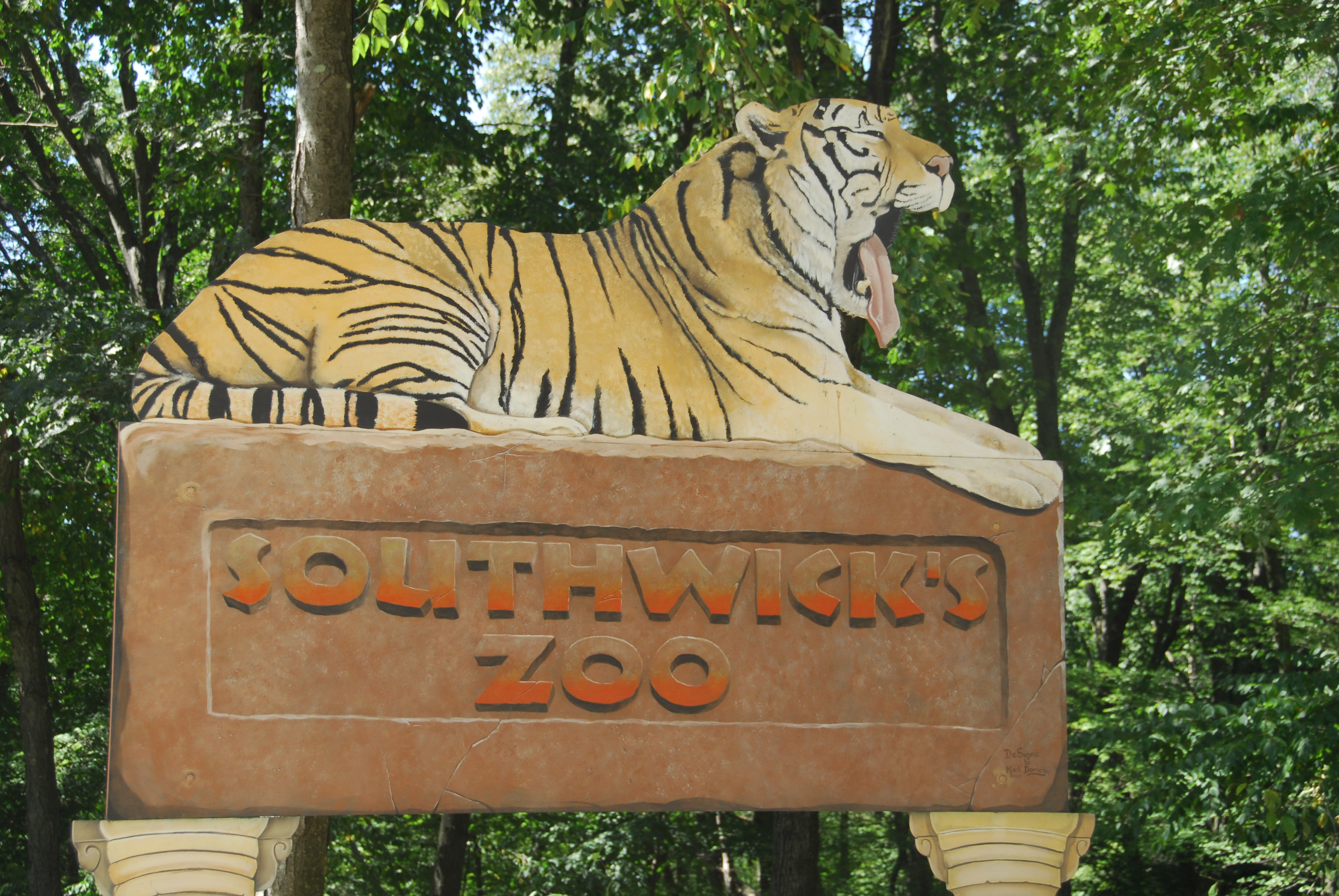
- Sign within Southwick's Zoo
- Interactive map of Southwick's Zoo
- 42.064643°N 71.5848541°W
- Date opened: 1963
- Location: Mendon, Massachusetts, United States
- Land area: 300 acres (120 ha)
- No. of animals: 850+
- No. of species: 162+
- Annual visitors: 475,000+
- Memberships: Zoological Association of America
- Website: southwickszoo.com

Southwick's Zoo, is a 300-acre zoological park in Mendon, Massachusetts, United States. Established in 1963, it is the largest zoo in New England. The Southwick and Brewer families have operated the zoo since its inception. The zoo is home to more than 850 animals from various regions of the world, offering visitors a chance to observe over 165 species of exotic animals.

Southwick's Zoo is home to the Earth Discovery Center, an environmental education facility that focuses on wildlife rehabilitation and conservation initiatives. Popular attractions at the zoo include the Skyfari Sky Ride, which offers aerial views of the exhibits, and animal encounters where guests can interact with giraffes, sloths, and other exotic animals. The zoo also features a petting zoo, and educational presentations aimed at fostering environmental awareness among children and adults.

The zoo is part of a larger entertainment and education complex that includes Galliford's Restaurant and Tavern, The Daniels Farmstead, Earth Limited, and Wild Events, offering a mix of wildlife, history, and dining experiences.

== History ==
The Southwick homestead was established in 1803 as a working dairy and vegetable farm. In the 1930s, the tradition of animal keeping began with Justin F. Southwick's interest in collecting exotic poultry. His son, Justin A. Southwick, had dedicated the entire property to aviculture by 1956 and introduced a donation box to fund the expansion of the collection.

The modern zoo was opened in 1963 under the name Southwick Wild Animal Farm. The Southwick and Brewer families managed both the zoo and the sale and trade of animals. The president of the zoo since 2016 has been Dr. Peter Brewer.

== Exhibits ==
=== North American Exhibit ===
An exhibit home to North American elk and a small population of wild turkey. The Woodland Express Train, a rubber tire train ride, passes through this exhibit and allows visitors to view the elk and surrounding wetlands.

=== Deer Forest ===
A 35-acre (14 ha) exhibit home to fallow deer, turtles, hawks, and wild turkey.

=== Parakeet Landing ===
A walk-through aviary allowing visitors to interact with parakeets and cockatiels.

=== EARTH Discovery Center ===
Headquarters of the environmental education non-profit EARTH Ltd. The EARTH Discovery Center is home to a variety of small animals used in EARTH's educational programs.

== Other attractions ==
Other attractions at the zoo include:

- A petting zoo, pony rides, camel rides, and a play area for children.
- The 15-minute Skyfari Sky Ride, an aerial tram ride allowing aerial views of the zoo.
- A 12-minute rubber-tired train ride through the North American Exhibit.
- An interactive attraction called The Elkhorn Mining Company, opened in 2012, which features a walk-in mine that allows visitors to pan for gold, gems, and fossils. The Elkhorn Livery Stables and pony rides are located next to the mine.
- Conceptual realists & conceptual favors

== Updates and additions ==
Over the last 20 years, several of the animal exhibits have been updated to more closely resemble the animals' natural habitat. African Plains Exhibit Expansion: The zoo has enhanced its African plains exhibit, featuring zebras and ostriches in a more natural, open environment that mimics their native habitats. This exhibit provides visitors with a safari-like experience and better visibility of the animals.

Southwick's Zoo began offering giraffe encounters on weekends in 2010.

In 2014, EARTH Ltd. and Southwick's Zoo began offering rhinoceros encounters to help promote rhinoceros conservation. These encounters allow visitors to meet the zoo's two white rhinos, Thelma and Louise.

In 2016, Southwick's Zoo opened a new reptile and insect walk-through building that houses more than 20 species. In 2017, a new restaurant and event building opened to the public and zoo guests.

In 2021, the Festival of Illumination: World of Lights! was organized at Southwick's Zoo.

== Animals ==
Southwick's Zoo is home to more than 115 species. The zoo houses four species of big cat and numerous bird species. There are also educational programs on birds. The zoo has the largest primate troupe in New England. They are the only zoo in New England with a chimpanzee exhibit.

== Education ==
EARTH Ltd provides Southwick's Zoo with assorted education programs. The organization performs live animal presentations at the EARTH Discovery Center, which cover topics including ecology and animal adaptations. EARTH offers outreach programs and spring and summer programs for young children while also training interns and docents.
