= Hot Dog Day =

Informal events

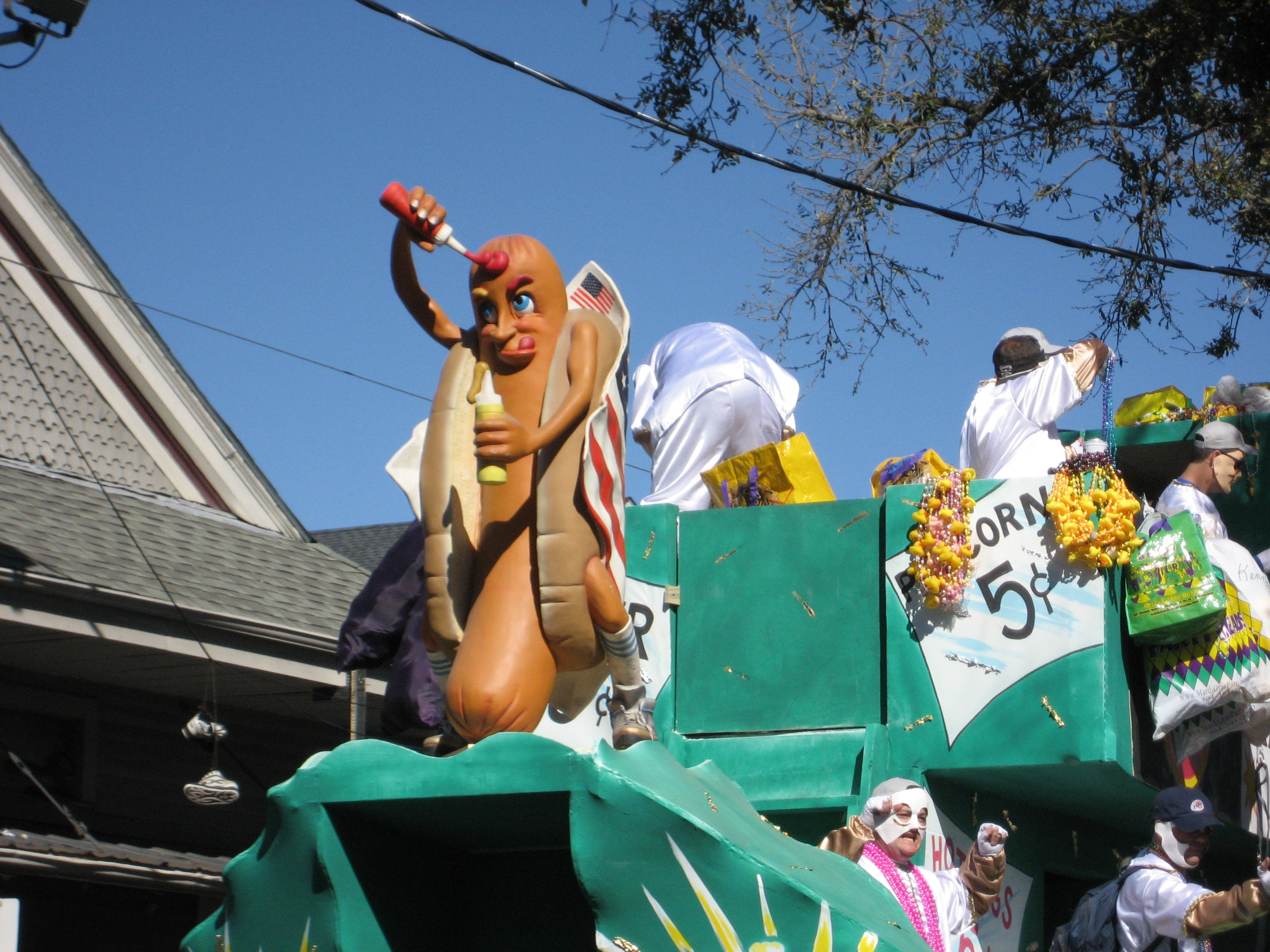
Hot dog float in the Thoth parade on Magazine Street during New Orleans Mardi Gras in 2007

Hot Dog Days are informal events that are celebrated in communities throughout the hotdog-eating world, including the United States, Canada and Australia. The earliest known Hot Dog Day was held in Alfred, New York, in 1972. As the name suggests, the festivals revolve around eating hot dogs, but usually there are many other activities such as wiener dog races, root beer chugging contests, and face painting. Often the proceeds from a hot dog day are given to charity.

Industry groups, such as National Hot Dog and Sausage Council in the US, encourage, sponsor, and support some of the events. The Council designates July as National Hot Dog Month; National Hot Dog Day varies year to year. It annually falls on the 3rd Wednesday of July, which in 2026, is July 15. The council also gives advice on hot-dog eating etiquette, which aren't considered strict, as most Hot Dog Day style events do not adhere to them.

== Notable Hot Dog Festivals ==
=== Hot Dog Day – Alfred, New York ===
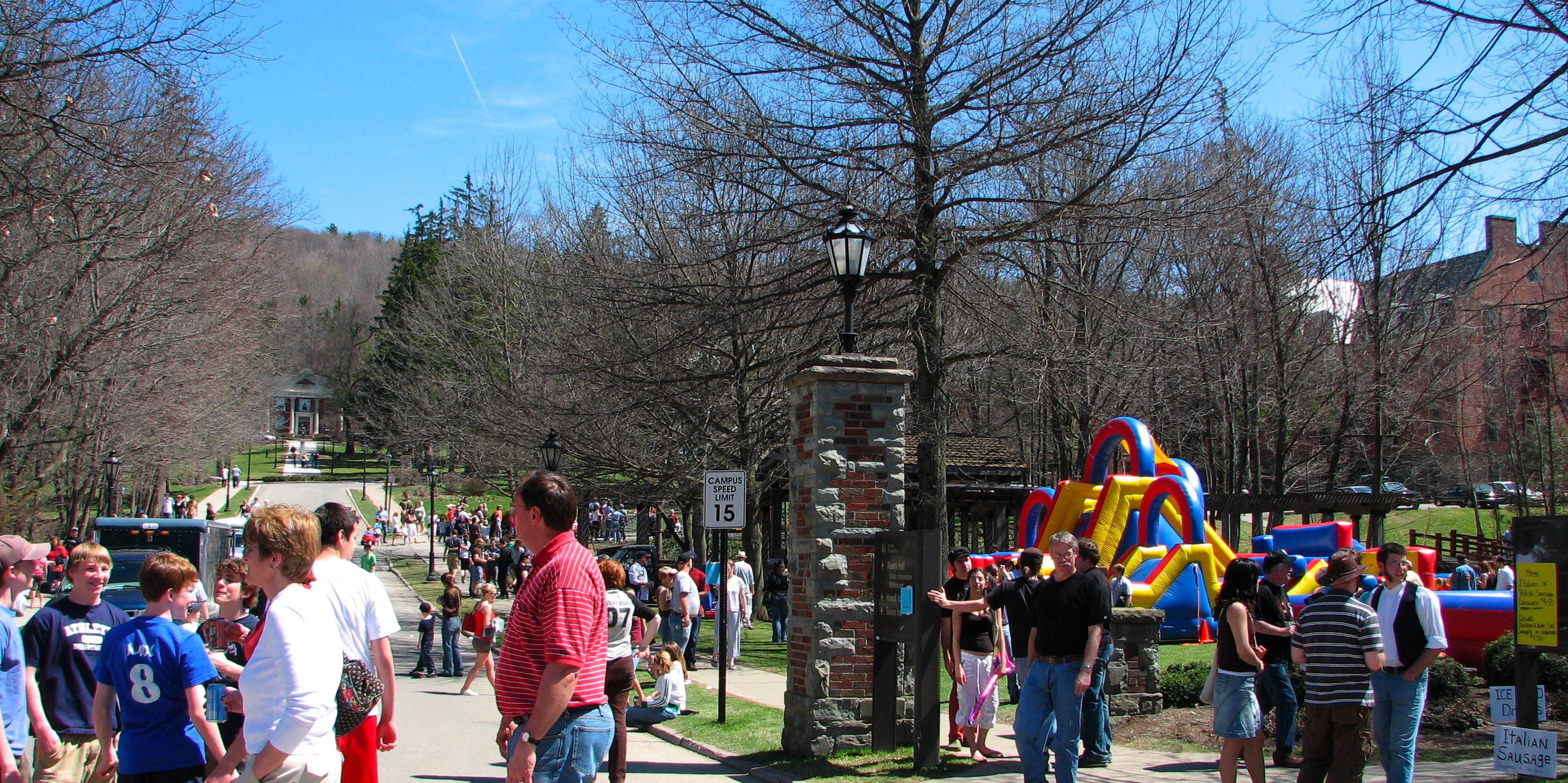
A crowd at Hot Dog Day 2007. Alfred University's Howell Hall and statue of King Alfred are visible on the left.

Hot Dog Day is celebrated every spring in the village of Alfred, New York. It was first organized in 1972 by Alfred University students Mark O'Meara and Eric "Rick" Vaughn as a way for area students to give back to the local community. The event is focused on the hot dog, a food popular among college students for its cheapness and ease of preparation. In the early years festival-goers could buy a hot dog and a drink for a quarter. Hot Dog Day itself is usually a Saturday towards the end of April, although many students celebrate the entire "hot dog week", running from that Wednesday to that Sunday.

Hot Dog Day, which is organized primarily by students from Alfred University and Alfred State College, raises money for local charities and community organizations such as the Alfred Fire Department (A.E. Crandall Hook & Ladder Co.) and Alfred Montessori School. Hot Dog Day often acts as an unofficial homecoming for Alfred's two colleges.

Events have included a parade, ice cream social, fun run, mud Olympics, hot dog eating contest, carnival, wiener dog race, live music, a chicken barbecue, and hot dog stands. Main Street is closed to traffic during the parade and originally hosted most of these activities until the 2015 event. From 1998 to 2019 the engineering department held the Pine Hill Derby, where engineering students would race homemade motor-less vehicles down Pine Hill on the north end of the Alfred University campus.

From 2015 through 2022 the carnival and fair were held on the campuses, alternating between the two each year. In 2022 the event returned for its 50th anniversary after a two-year absence due to the COVID-19 pandemic, and both O'Meara and Vaughn returned to act as grand marshals. After an eight-year hiatus, most of the festival returned to Main Street in 2023.

=== Annual Hot Dog Lunch on Capitol Hill ===
The Annual Hot Dog Lunch in Washington, D.C., is one of the most popular social events on Capitol Hill. Sponsored by the North American Meat Institute for the past 40 years, more than 1,000 members of Congress, Administration officials, journalists and lobbyists gather in a courtyard for a huge hot dog picnic. At the lunch, hot dog companies serve their franks from traditional hot dog carts and popular retired major league baseball players sign autographs for attendees.

People for the Ethical Treatment of Animals (PETA) has concurrently held their Congressional Veggie Dog Lunch outside the Rayburn House Office Building since 1996. PETA employees offer veggie dogs and encourage attendees to go vegan.

=== Boston Hot Dog Safari ===
The Boston Hot Dog Safari is an annual charity benefit founded by Boston sports radio host Eddie Andelman. The charity began in 1990 to help find a cure for cystic fibrosis by raising money for the Joey Fund, named after a friend of his who died of the disease in 1986 at the age of twelve. One of Andelman's all-time favorite foods are hot dogs, which is why the charity is called the Hot Dog Safari.

The Hot Dog Safari is one of the most popular charity events in Boston today. Over the years, it has a gained a steady flow of participants as well as money for charity. In one single day, an estimated $150,000 was raised to help find a cure for cystic fibrosis. Medical experts said that a cure for the disease is close to being found in only a few years' time.

The Safari is an all-you-eat supply of hot dogs, sausages, and ice cream sundaes. Money is earned from tickets (sold either at the door or in advance) and raffles. Entertainment is also provided.

=== West Virginia Hot Dog Festival ===
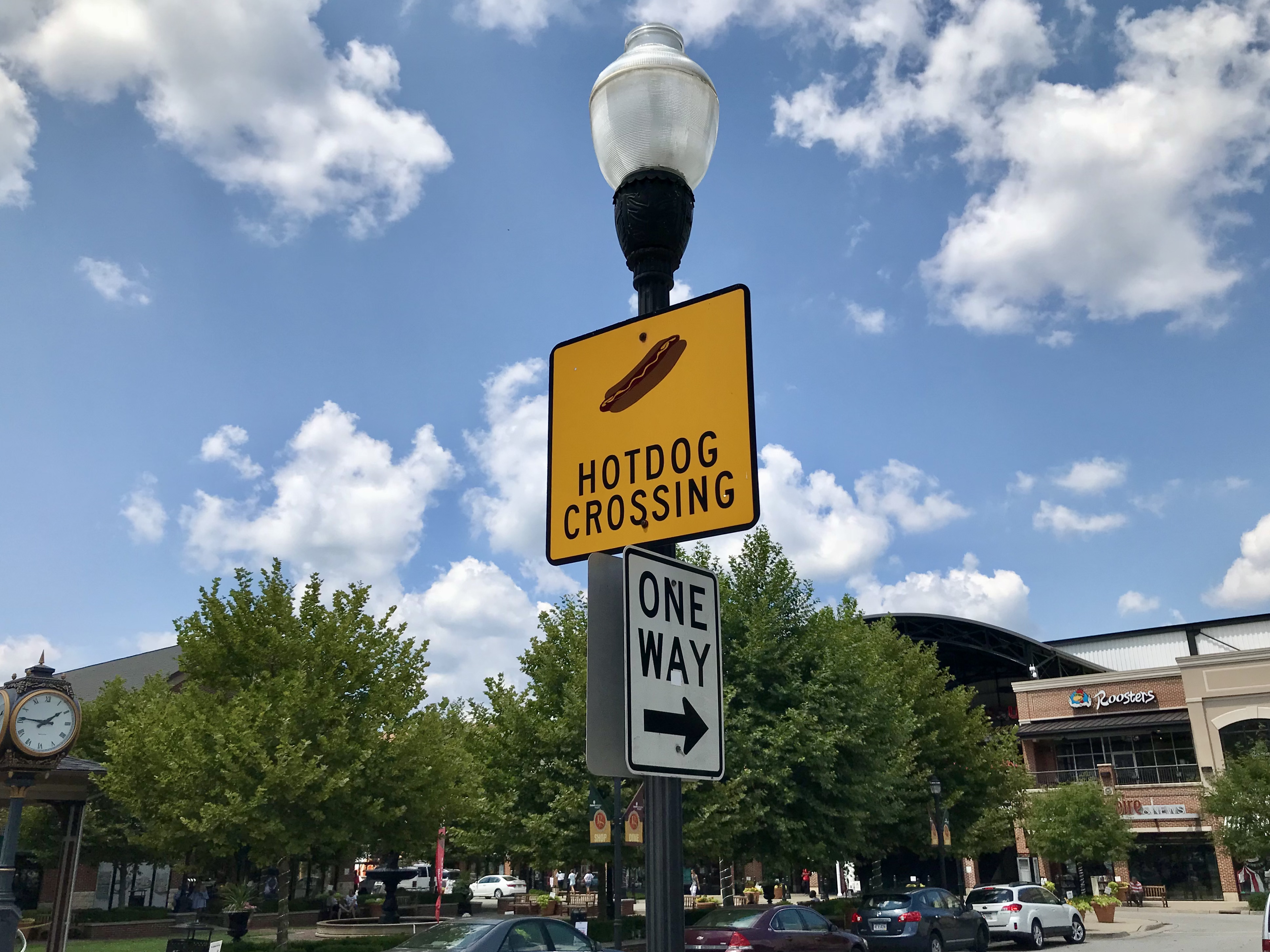
"Hot Dog Crossing" sign in Pullman Square, Huntington, West Virginia, in 2018

The West Virginia Hot Dog Festival has been held in Huntington, West Virginia, on the last Saturday in July since 2005. A charitable event, the festival may raise $10,000 or more for the children's cancer unit at the Edwards' Comprehensive Cancer Center. Activities include a bun run (or walk), a weiner dog race, the owner-dog look-alike contest, a car and truck show, a hotdog eating contest, and a harmonica championship.

== Other hot dog events ==
- Nathan's Hot Dog Eating Contest in Brooklyn, New York – an eating competition at Coney Island on US Independence Day
- Stanley Park, Kitchener, Ontario, Optimist Club – Season End Hot Dog Day Celebration
- Kiwanis Club of Ingersoll, Ontario – Hot Dog Day
- Newburyport, Massachusetts, Hot Dog Day
- Vancouver Hot Dog Day
- Winnipeg Mennonite Elementary Schools Hot Dog Day
- Hot dog lovers in Philadelphia, Pennsylvania, celebrate National Hotdog Month by sponsoring Hot Dog Crawls, Hot Dog Safaris & Cook Offs as well as organizing free Hot Dog lunches for Veterans and kid's summer camps during July.
- Leo's Lunch & Cafe, Hackettstown NJ Annual National Hot Dog Day Celebration, Free hot dogs, contests & games.

== See also ==
- Carnival
- Fair
- Festival
