= Aaron Aldrich House =

Historic house in Ohio, United States

- U.S. National Register of Historic Places
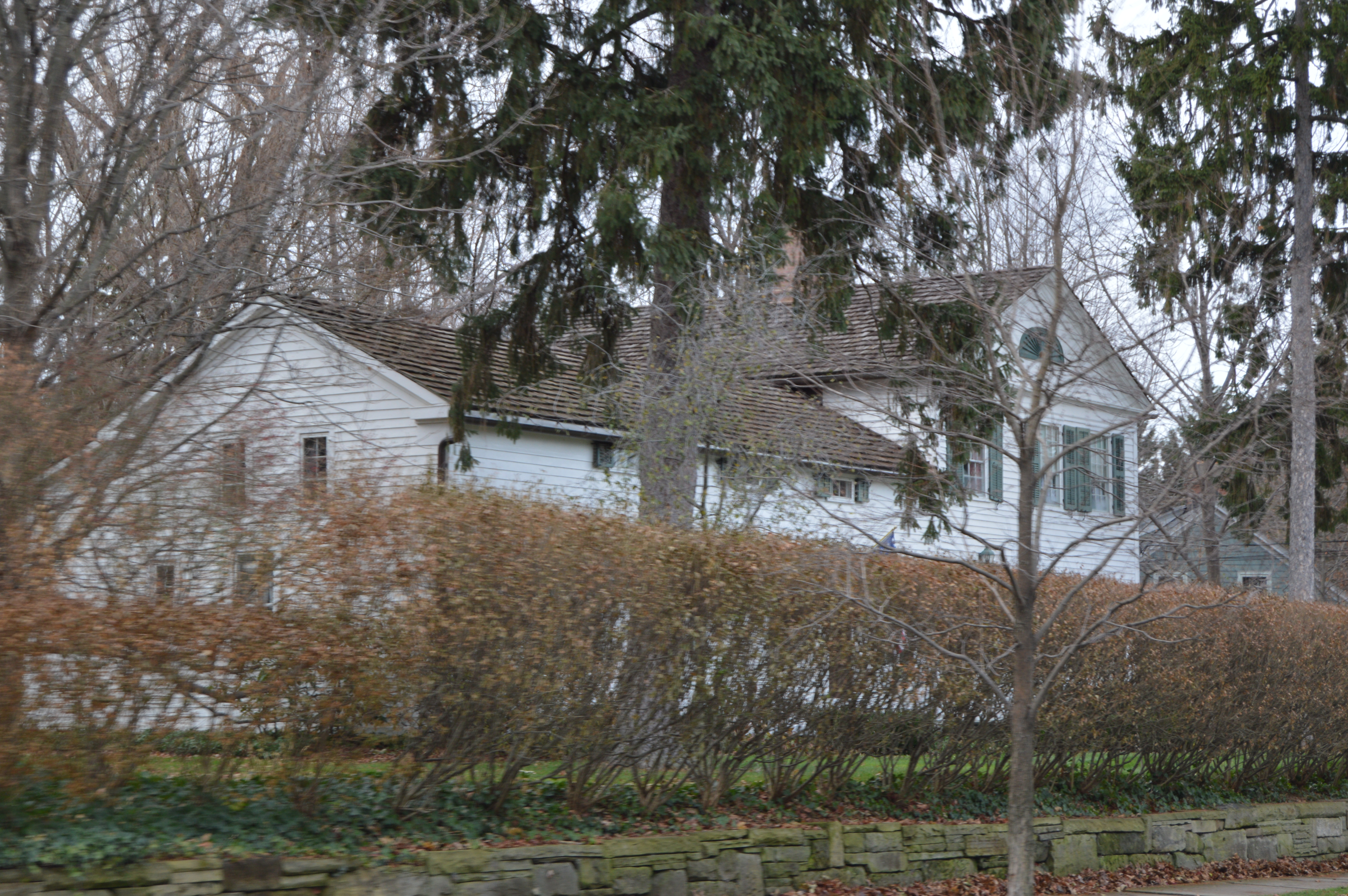

- Location within Ohio Location within the United States
- Location: 30663 Lake Road, Bay Village, Ohio
- Coordinates: 41°29′48.82″N 81°57′27.65″W
- Built: 1829
- Architect: Aaron Aldrich
- Architectural style: Federal
- NRHP reference No.: 78002033
- Added to NRHP: December 4, 1978

The Aaron Aldrich House is a historic house located at 30663 Lake Road in Bay Village, Ohio. It is locally significant as an exceptionally well-preserved example of a Federal period farmhouse.

== Description and history ==
The 2 1/2-story, Federal style house was built in 1829 by Rhode Island native Aaron Aldrich, a skilled craftsman, and one of the towns early settlers. It has historically been used as a single dwelling. It was listed on the National Register of Historic Places on December 4, 1978.
