= Jacob Aldrich House =

Historic house in Massachusetts, United States

- J. Aldrich House
- U.S. National Register of Historic Places
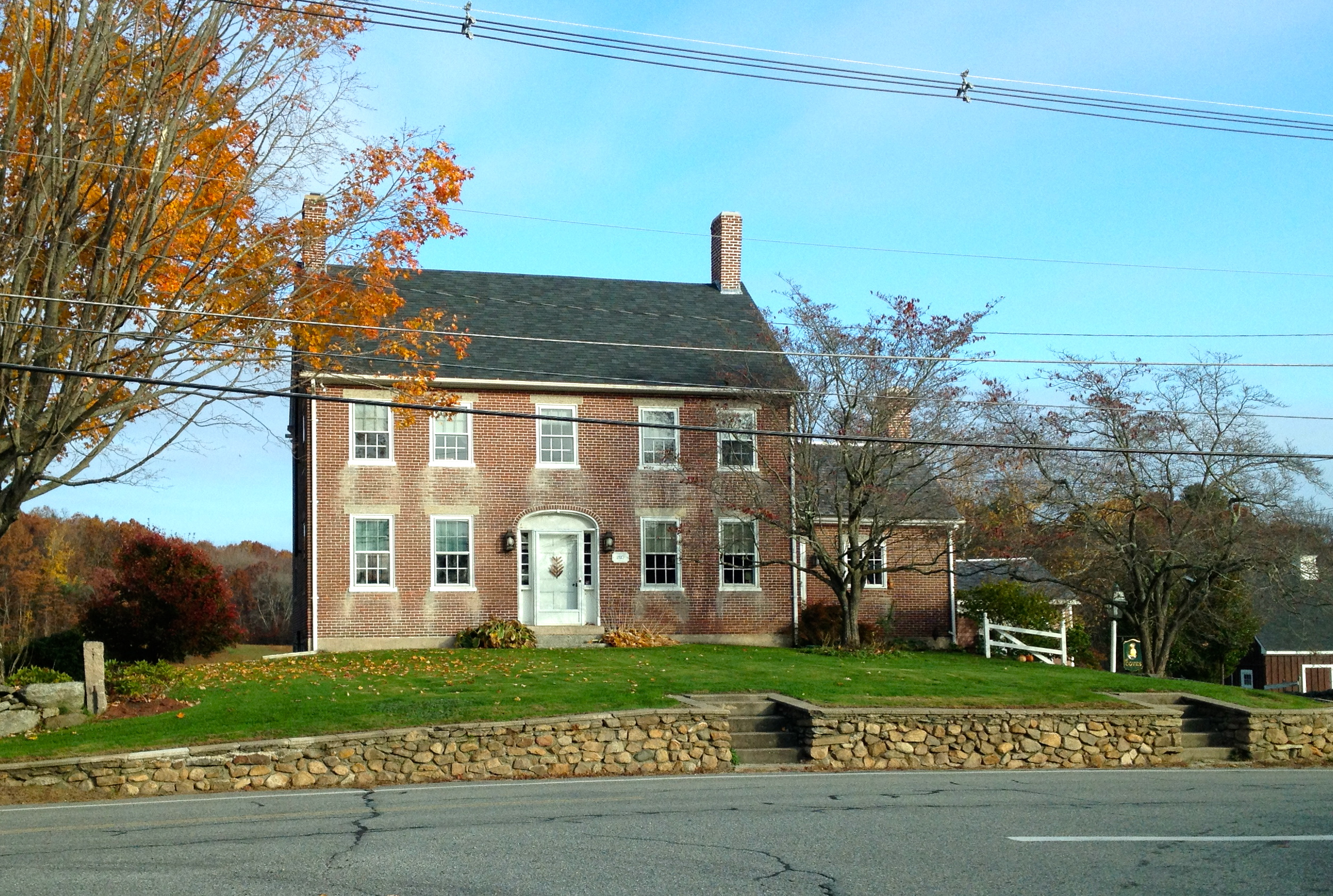
- Jacob Aldrich House, South Uxbridge, MA

- Location within Massachusetts Location within the United States
- Location: Uxbridge, Massachusetts
- Coordinates: 42°1′38″N 71°38′35″W
- Built: 1825
- Architectural style: Federal
- MPS: Uxbridge MRA
- NRHP reference No.: 84002896
- Added to NRHP: January 20, 1984

The Jacob Aldrich House, also known as the J. Aldrich House, is an historic house located at 389 Aldrich Street, in Uxbridge, Massachusetts. On January 20, 1984, it was added to the National Register of Historic Places.

== History ==
The Aldrich family were Quakers and their community included their homes, businesses including the Jacob Aldrich Farm (and Orchard) at 389 Aldrich Street which is a light colored brick home made in a kiln nearby on River Road. The Jacob Aldrich Farm and Orchard is located on Massachusetts Route 98, in a village of similar homes from the 18th and 19th century. The house is 2 1/2 stories in height, with end chimneys and a side gable roof. The main facade is five bays wide and symmetrical, with a center entrance flanked by sidelight windows and narrow pilasters, which rise to a semi-oval Federal-style fan. The brickwork is somewhat unusual, with the occasional use of square bricks on the outer walls.

== Aldrich Village ==
In the 1820-30s, Aldrich Village sprang up as a community of the extended family of the Aldriches. The Aldrich family began in America in Mendon with George Aldrich, and the family eventually became a political force (see the article on the Seth Aldrich House for more info). The Aldrich family were Quakers and their community included their homes and businesses including the Jacob Aldrich Farm. 364 Aldrich Street was owned by Daniel Aldrich who ran a saw mill, a blacksmith shop and a wheelwright shop which produced numerous products such as roof shingles, wagons, lumber. 364 Aldrich is also on the Historic Register as are several other homes in this vicinity. For a more complete listing of these older Quaker Homes on the National Register in Uxbridge, please see the link below for local historic listings. A one-room schoolhouse was in the community as was an ice house cutting and storing ice from Aldrich Pond. 317 Aldrich Street was the Seth Aldrich House and the family cemetery is on Glendale Street.

== See also ==
- Seth Aldrich House
- National Register of Historic Places listings in Uxbridge, Massachusetts
- Ironstone, Massachusetts
- Friends Meetinghouse (Uxbridge, Massachusetts)
