= Mendon, Massachusetts =

- Town
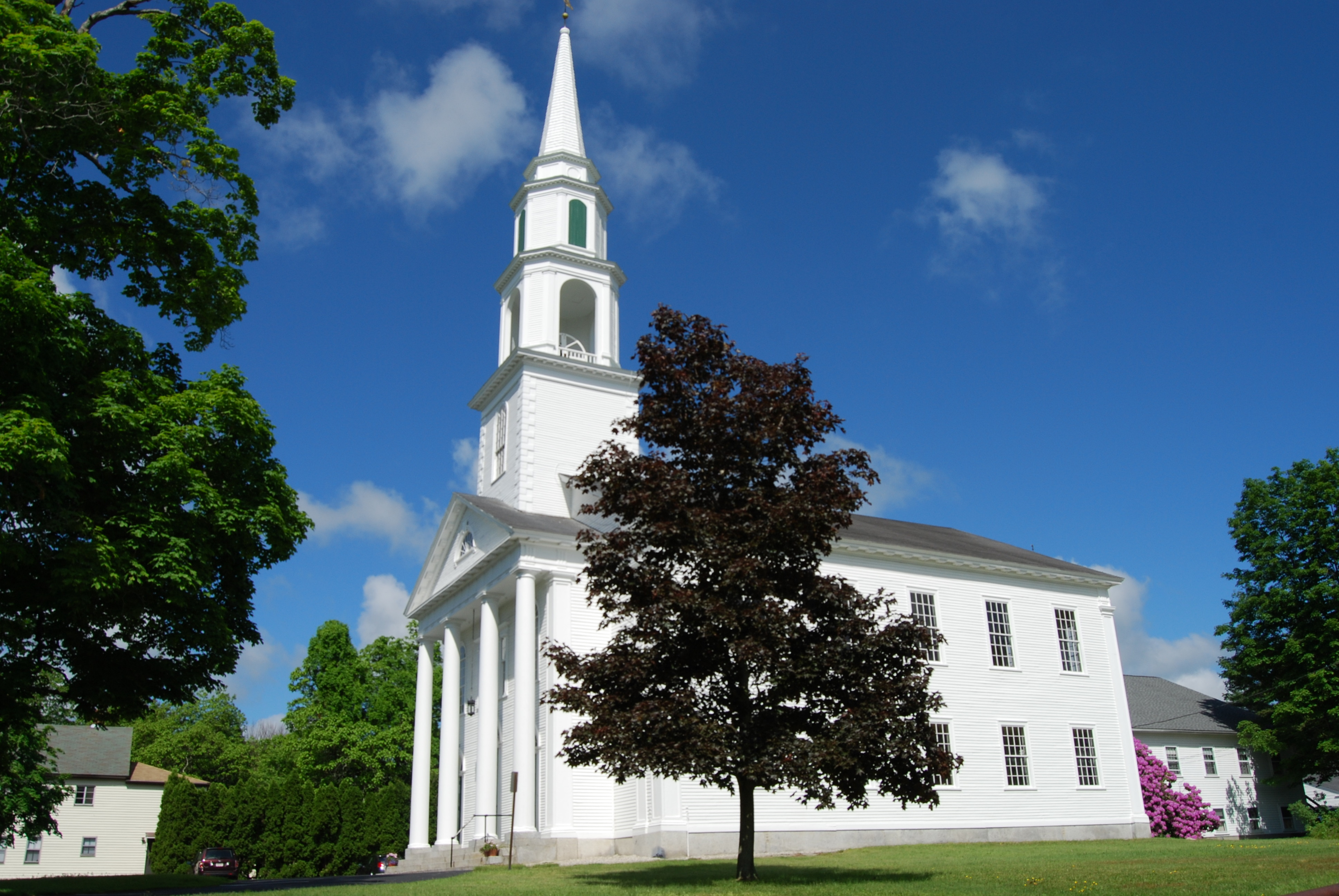
- First Church, Mendon

- Seal

- Location in Worcester County and the state of Massachusetts.
- Coordinates: 42°06′20″N 71°33′10″W
- Country: United States
- State: Massachusetts
- County: Worcester
- Settled: 1660
- Incorporated: May 15, 1667

Government
  - Type: Open town meeting
  - Town Administrator: Jeremy Stull
  - Select Board: Mike Merolli (Chair); Alejna Brugos(Vice-Chair); Jason Kuter; Brendan Chenelle; Brian Morford

Area
  - Total: 18.3 sq mi (47.3 km^{2})
  - Land: 18.1 sq mi (46.9 km^{2})
  - Water: 0.15 sq mi (0.4 km^{2})
- Elevation: 331 ft (101 m)

Population (2020)
  - Total: 6,228
  - Density: 344/sq mi (132.8/km^{2})
- Time zone: UTC-5 (Eastern)
  - Summer (DST): UTC-4 (Eastern)
- ZIP Code: 01756
- Area code: 508 / 774
- FIPS code: 25-40255
- GNIS feature ID: 0618371
- Website: footnotes =

Mendon is a town in Worcester County, Massachusetts, United States. The population was 6,228 at the 2020 census. Mendon is part of the Blackstone River Valley National Heritage Corridor, an early center of the Industrial Revolution in the United States. Mendon celebrated its 350th anniversary on May 15, 2017.

== History ==
=== Early history ===
Native Americans inhabited the Mendon area for thousands of years prior to European colonization of the Americas. At the time of contact, Nipmuc people inhabited the area that would become Mendon, and Nipmuc Pond is named for them. Nipmuc Regional High School was named after this lake. Nipmuc means "small pond place" or "people of the fresh waters". The Nipmuc name does not refer to a specific village or tribe, but to natives that inhabited almost all of central Massachusetts. Over 500 Nipmuc live today in Massachusetts, and there are two nearby reservations at Grafton and Webster. The Nipmuc had a written language, tools, a graphite mine at Sturbridge, and well-developed agriculture, including maize (a variant of corn), beans and squash.

In the early 1600s, Praying Indians (natives who converted to Christianity) were settled into Praying Towns. Wacentug and Rice City held two of these villages in Mendon, in a section that later became Uxbridge. These were two of the 14 Praying Indian villages established by Reverend John Eliot, from Natick and Roxbury, who translated the Bible into the Nipmuc language.

=== Pioneer settlement ===
Pioneers from Braintree petitioned to receive a land grant for 8 miles (13 km) square of land, 15 miles (24 km) west of Medfield. In September 1662, after the deed was signed with a Native American chief, "Great John" and another Sachem, Quashaamit, the pioneers entered this part of what is now southern Worcester County. Earlier, unofficial, settlement occurred here in the 1640s, by pioneers from Roxbury. This was the beginning of Mendon.

The land for the settlement was 8 miles (13 km) square of Native American land in the Massachusetts Bay Colony and was purchased from the Nipmuc Indians, "for divers good and vallewable considerations them there unto Moovinge and especiall for an in consideration of the summe of twenty fower pound Ster." In 1662, "Squinshepauke Plantation was started at the Netmocke settlement and plantation", and was incorporated as the town of Mendon in 1667. The settlers were ambitious and set about clearing the roads that would mark settlement patterns throughout the town's history.

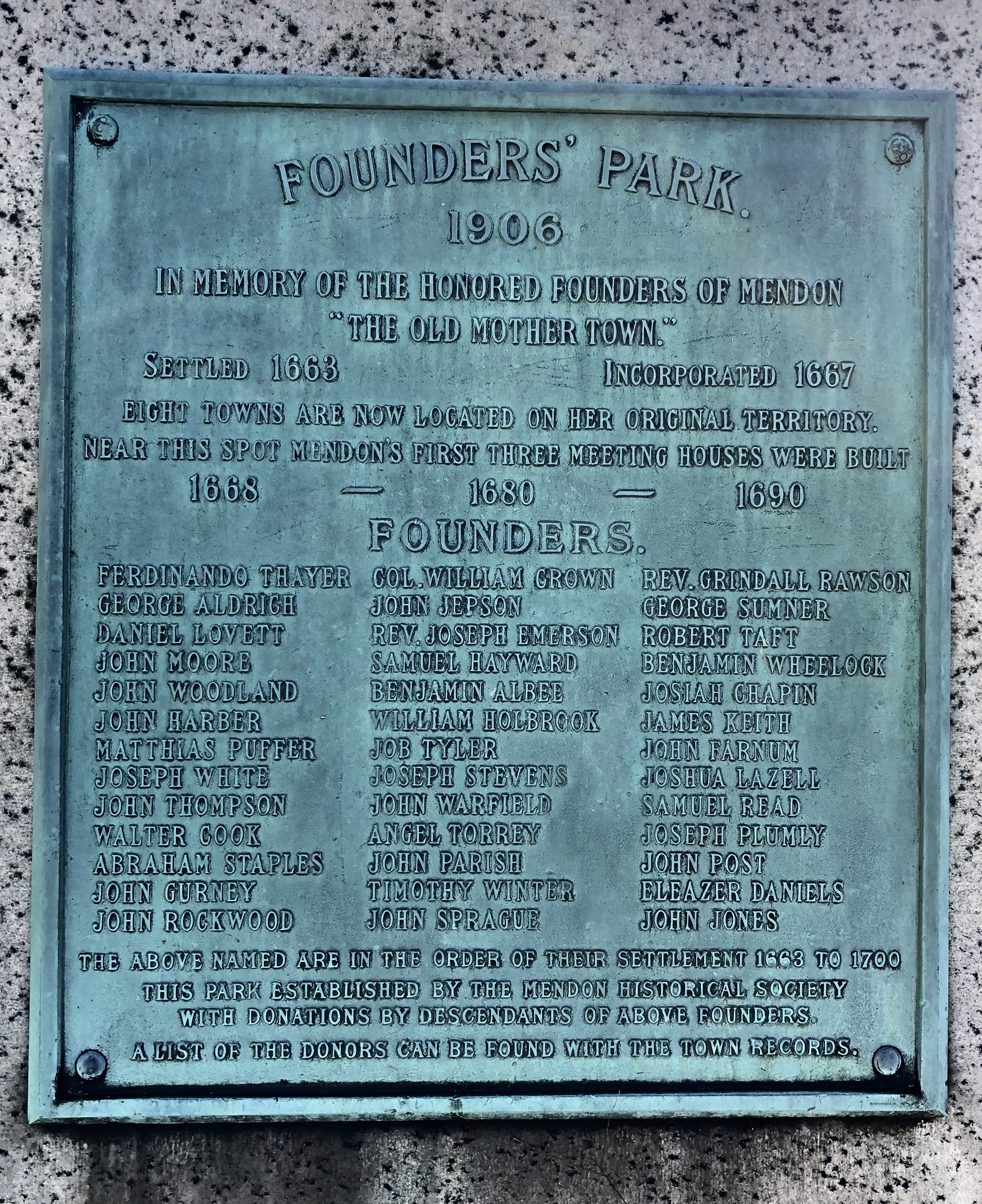
Photo of the Founders' Plaque in Founders' Park, Mendon, Mass.

The early settlement at Mendon was first listed in Middlesex County in 1667, then in 1671 in Suffolk County, and in Worcester County from 1731 onward. Mendon was first settled in 1660 and was officially incorporated in 1667. The town was originally 64 square miles (170 km^{2}), including at least part of the modern-day towns of Milford, Bellingham, Hopedale, Uxbridge, Upton, Blackstone, Northbridge and Millville. For this reason, the town of Mendon is sometimes referred to as "Mother Mendon". Benjamin Albee (1614–1695) erected a water-powered mill on Mill River in 1664 where it crosses modern-day Hartford Avenue. and was one of the town's important early residents. The mill was the first water-powered grist mill in the region.

On July 14, 1675, early violence in King Philip's War took place in Mendon, with the deaths of multiple residents and the destruction of Albee's mill. These were the first settlers killed in this war in the Colony of Massachusetts. A man named Richard Post, of Post's lane, may have been the first settler killed. The town was largely burnt to the ground later that winter in early 1676. During King Philip's War, many Nipmuc from around Marlboro and Natick were interned Deer Island, and many died from the harsh winter in 1675. The town of Mendon was resettled and rebuilt in 1680.

Robert Taft, Sr., settled here, in the part that became Uxbridge, in 1680 and was the patriarch of the famous Taft family. He settled here in 1669 and was among those forced back to Braintree because of King Philip's War. In 1712, Mendon was the birthplace of Lydia Chapin, who became America's first legal woman voter, known later as Lydia Chapin Taft, or simply Lydia Taft. Ezra T. Benson was born here and became a famous Mormon Missionary and Utah Territory legislator. (See also the article of neighboring Uxbridge, Massachusetts.) The Taft family became an American political dynasty, especially in Ohio, but also in Iowa, Rhode Island, Vermont, and other states. President William Howard Taft was a descendant and also was a descendant of George Aldrich.

Another American family began in Mendon with the immigrant George Aldrich. His descendants included a number of U.S. congressmen, including Senator Nelson Aldrich, who started the Federal Reserve Bank, and Vice President Nelson Aldrich Rockefeller. Other descendants were Ezra T. Benson and his grandson, Ezra Taft Benson, former Secretary of Agriculture under President Dwight D. Eisenhower, later 13th President of the Church of Jesus Christ of Latter-day Saints.

=== Colonial and revolutionary era ===
Mendon would eventually rebuild and find itself along Boston's Middle Post Road (Route 16 today). Milestone 37 (from Boston) was erected in 1772 and still stands today. In 1719, Bellingham became the first community to break off from Mother Mendon and incorporate as a separate entity. In 1789, it is purported that President George Washington, during his inaugural journey, was denied a room in Mendon by an innkeeper's wife.

=== Modern Mendon ===
Lake Nipmuc Park was a popular resort in the early 20th century, featuring leading musical and vaudeville talent. Vintage postcards from this resort are frequently for sale on eBay. The first Aerosmith gig took place at Nipmuc Regional High School (now Miscoe Hill Middle School) in this town on November 6, 1970. Mendon is home to two Boy Scout (BSA) troops, Troop 1 Mendon and Troop 44 Mendon.

Mendon has teamed up with neighboring town Upton to make the Mendon Upton Regional School District (MURSD), this district features four schools. In elementary school the two towns are split and each have equally nice schools. However, in middle school the classes merge into one and attend Miscoe Hill Middle School. Finally, in high school they attend Nipmuc Regional High School, which was recently named one of the top 500 schools in the United States.

In 1986 Congress created the Blackstone River Valley National Heritage Corridor, a national park. Mendon falls within this corridor. In modern times, Mendon serves primarily as a bedroom community but has seen some significant commercial development along Route 16 in recent years. Southwick's Zoo in Mendon is currently Massachusetts's largest zoo. The Mendon Twin Drive-In, one of only three drive-in theaters in Massachusetts, is located in Mendon.

== Geography ==
According to the United States Census Bureau, the town has a total area of 18.3 square miles (47 km^{2}), of which 18.1 square miles (47 km^{2}) is land and 0.2 square miles (0.52 km^{2}), or 0.88%, is water.

== Demographics ==
Historical population
Year	Pop.	±%
1790	1,555	—
1850	1,300	−16.4%
1860	1,351	+3.9%
1870	1,175	−13.0%
1880	1,094	−6.9%
1890	919	−16.0%
1900	911	−0.9%
1910	880	−3.4%
1920	961	+9.2%
1930	1,107	+15.2%
1940	1,315	+18.8%
1950	1,619	+23.1%
1960	2,068	+27.7%
1970	2,524	+22.1%
1980	3,108	+23.1%
1990	4,010	+29.0%
2000	5,286	+31.8%
2010	5,839	+10.5%
2020	6,228	+6.7%
2024*	6,441	+3.4%
* = population estimate. Source: United States census records and Population Estimates Program data.

As of the census of 2000, there were 5,286 people, 1,815 households, and 1,450 families residing in the town. The population density was 292.1 inhabitants per square mile (112.8/km^{2}). There were 1,886 housing units at an average density of 104.2 per square mile (40.2/km^{2}). The racial makeup of the town was 97.99% White, 0.40% African American, 0.59% Asian, 0.15% from other races, and 0.87% from two or more races. Hispanic or Latino of any race were 0.96% of the population.

There were 1,815 households, out of which 42.2% had children under the age of 18 living with them, 71.5% were married couples living together, 6.2% had a female householder with no husband present, and 20.1% were non-families. Of all households, 16.0% were made up of individuals, and 6.2% had someone living alone who was 65 years of age or older. The average household size was 2.90 and the average family size was 3.28.

In the town, the population was spread out, with 29.5% under the age of 18, 4.9% from 18 to 24, 32.7% from 25 to 44, 24.5% from 45 to 64, and 8.4% who were 65 years of age or older. The median age was 37 years. For every 100 females, there were 98.5 males. For every 100 females age 18 and over, there were 97.1 males.

The median income for a household in the town was $71,164, and the median income for a family was $79,337. Males had a median income of $55,230 versus $36,174 for females. The per capita income for the town was $27,693. About 2.6% of families and 4.0% of the population were below the poverty line, including 3.4% of those under age 18 and 10.9% of those age 65 or over.

== Government ==
State government
State Representative(s):	Brian W. Murray (D)
State Senator(s):	Ryan Fattman (R)
Governor's Councilor(s):	Paul DePalo (D)
Federal government
U.S. Representative(s):	James P. McGovern (D-2nd District),
U.S. Senators:	Elizabeth Warren (D), Ed Markey (D)

== Library ==
Mendon's Taft Public Library was established in 1881. In fiscal year 2008, the town of Mendon spent 1.66% ($187,825) of its budget on its public library—approximately $32 per person, per year ($39.19 adjusted for inflation to 2021). A new library, built on the site of the former St. Michael's Church, was completed in 2016.

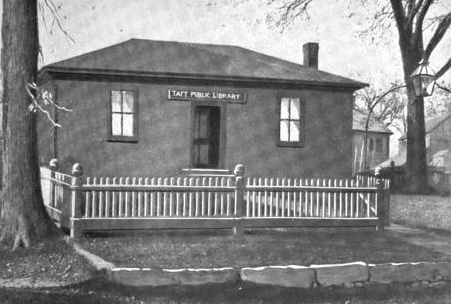
Taft Public Library, Mendon, 1899

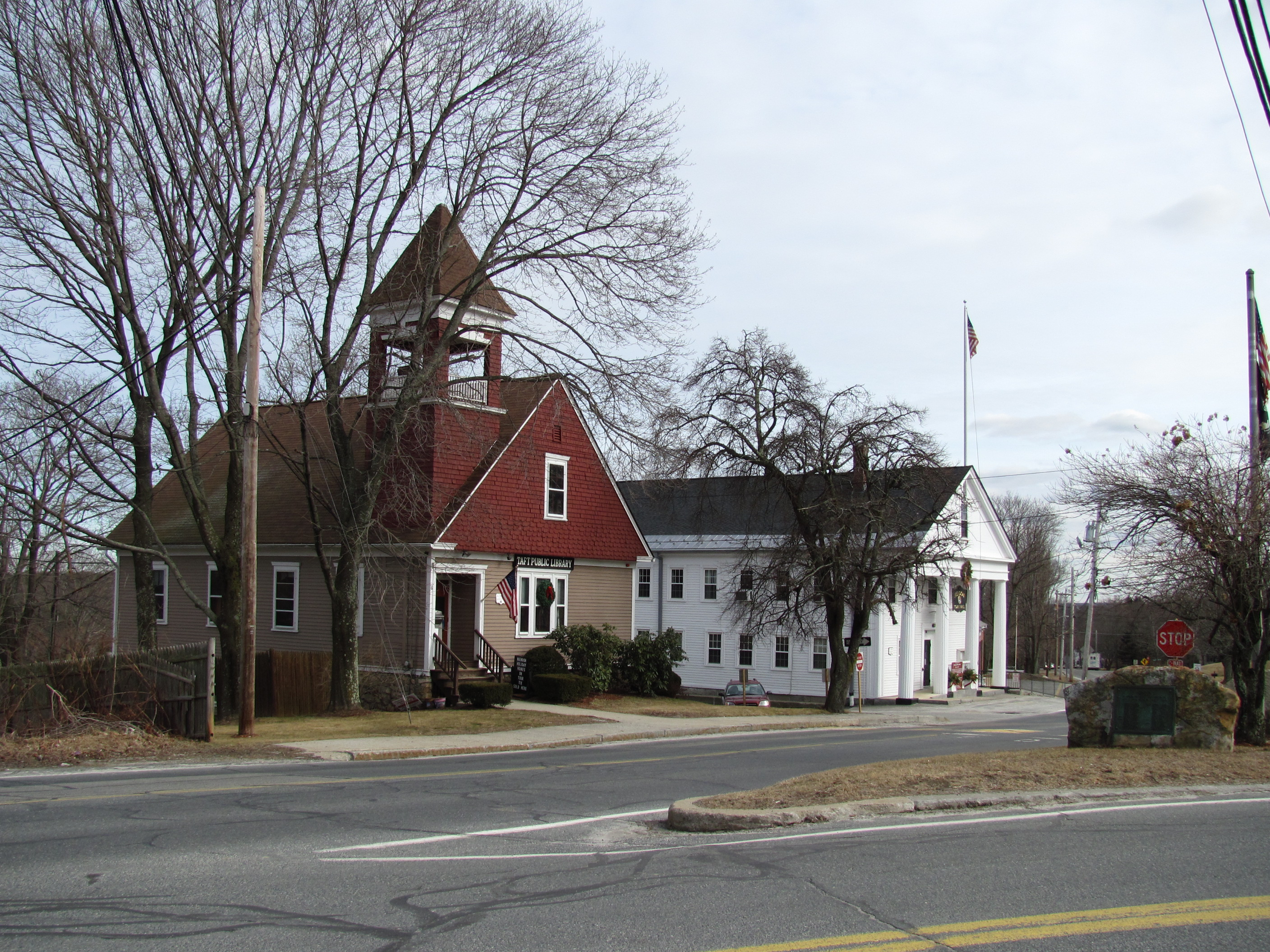
Taft Public Library and Mendon Town Hall, 2010

== Points of interest ==
- Mendon Twin Drive-In
- Southwick's Zoo
- Mendon Airport (private)

== National Historic Places ==
- Mendon Center Historic District
- Nathan C. Aldrich House and Resthaven Chapel
- North Avenue Rural Historic District
- Olney Cook Artisan Shop

== Media ==
- The Upton and Mendon Town Crier newspaper (circulation ~5500) is published twice monthly and mailed free to all residents of Mendon and the adjoining town of Upton.
- The Milford Daily News is the nearest daily publication.

== Notable people ==
- Benjamin Adams (1764–1837), U. S. Congressman
- Adin Ballou (1803–1890), social reformer, pacifist, and Unitarian minister, led Mendon's Unitarian Church from 1831 to 1842, immediately before his founding of the Hopedale Community
- Ezra T. Benson (1811–1869), Mormon pioneer (birthplace)
- Adin B. Capron (1841–1911), U. S. Congressman
- Albert Harkness (1822–1907), scholar and educator
- Lydia Taft (1712–1778), America's first woman voter (birthplace)
- Eli Thayer (1819–1899), abolitionist congressman and founder of Oread Institute
- Armenia S. White (1817–1916), suffragette, philanthropist, social reformer
