= Robert Rogerson =

American businessman

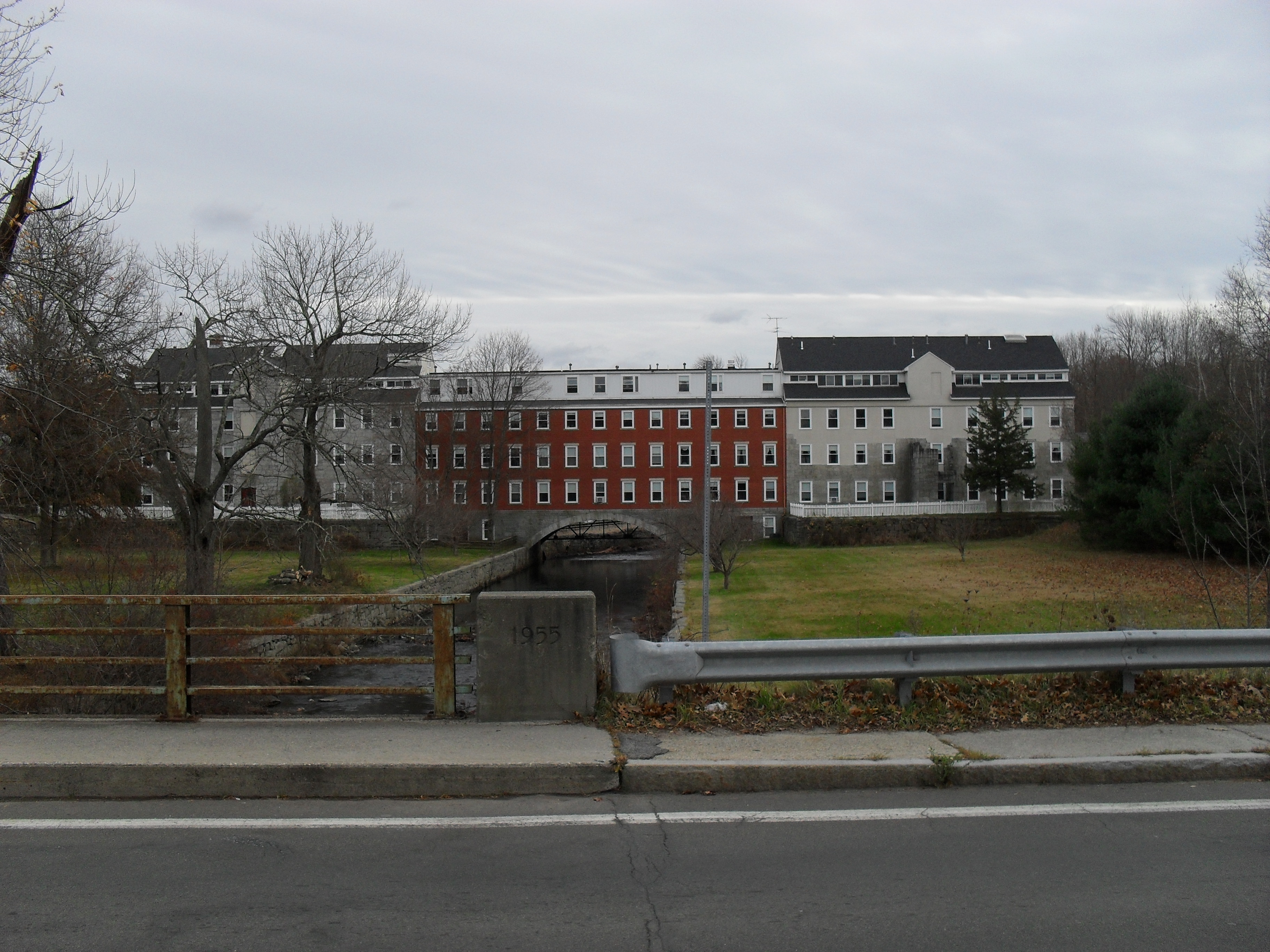
Crown & Eagle Mill, built in 1824 by Robert Rogerson is considered a masterpiece of early American Industrial architecture

Robert Rogerson was an early American industrialist. He was born in Taunton, Massachusetts, and died in the United States.

== Early career ==
Robert Rogerson was born in Taunton to parents who immigrated to the US from the UK. After leaving Taunton, he came to Uxbridge, Massachusetts, where he acquired the Clapp Mill in 1817, which had been established on the Mumford River about seven years earlier. This was the oldest cotton mill in Uxbridge. Rogerson then built two cotton mills at the Mumford River in Uxbridge in 1825. The complex became known as the Crown and Eagle Mills. The name derived from a tribute to both of his parents original (the Crown) and his families adopted (the Eagle) homelands. As well as the mills themselves, Rogerson built a village, acclaimed as an architectural masterpiece, designed and constructed with devotion and extravagance.

=== Later history of the mills ===
It is known that Rogerson's ownership of the Crown and Eagle ended around 1837. The business had failed, partly due to the expense he had lavished on construction, and was acquired by James Whitin and the Whitin Family, who continued to operate the mill as the Uxbridge Cotton Mills.

The Crown and Eagle Mills were burned around 1975. They have been restored and converted into Senior Housing. Rogersons Village, built by Robert Rogerson, is now part of the Blackstone River Valley National Heritage Corridor and is on the National Register of Historic Places.

== Personal life ==
Rogerson's wife may have been Ann Rogerson, who is listed in the Douglas Vital Records as wife of Robert Rogerson, having died in Douglas, Massachusetts. His daughter, Elizabeth Slater Rogerson, died in Uxbridge at age 18 on January 19, 1842.

He was also a scholar, a musician and for many years, the president of Boston's Handel and Haydn Society. Rogerson did not die in Uxbridge, at least prior to 1850, but apparently lived there until at least the early 1840s.

== See also ==
- List of Registered Historic Places in Uxbridge, Massachusetts
- Rogerson's Village Historic District
- North Uxbridge—the main village nearby Rogerson's village
- Uxbridge, Massachusetts - center of the Blackstone Valley, New England's historic National Park area
- Whitinsville, Massachusetts
