= Linwood, Massachusetts =

- Village
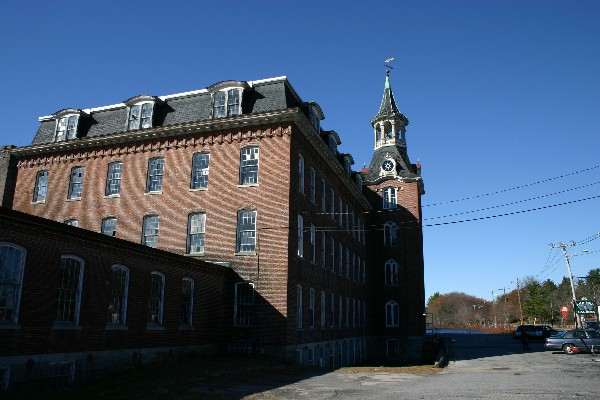
- Historic Linwood Mill

- Location within Massachusetts Location within the United States
- Coordinates: 42°05′50″N 71°38′41″W
- Country: United States
- State: Massachusetts
- County: Worcester
- Elevation: 269 ft (82 m)
- Time zone: UTC-5 (Eastern (EST))
  - Summer (DST): UTC-4 (EDT)
- ZIP Code: 01525
- GNIS feature ID: 611020

Linwood is a village with its own post office in the towns of Northbridge and Uxbridge, Massachusetts, United States.

The zip code of the Linwood post office is 01525. As a village of both Uxbridge and Northbridge, Linwood has separate municipal services from Uxbridge or Northbridge, for fire, police, EMS, School district, public works, and other services, depending on the town (township) boundary. Worcester County, Massachusetts Sheriff, Lewis Evangelidis runs corrections, and court services from West Boylston, and Worcester District is the regional judicial jurisdiction. The Uxbridge district court serves surrounding towns. Linwood is closest to the villages of Whitinsville, and North Uxbridge. The village of Linwood was predominantly settled by French Canadians, who historically worked in the local textile industry. The Whitin Cotton Mills at Linwood were the principal industry and are a good example of the industrial architecture of the 19th century.

== The Whitin Cotton Mill ==
The damming of the Mumford River in the early 19th century provided water power and led to the development of the Whitin Machine Works, the Cotton Mill and Linwood Mill. The mills also had access to a trunk line of the Providence and Worcester Railroad allowing easy transportation of goods into and out of the manufacturing facilities.

In 2011, the Linwood Mill was developed into 75 studio, one bedroom, and two bedroom units of 55+ ‘active adult’ senior rental residences.

The ground floor of the Linwood Mill was developed into 22,000 square feet of commercial space including a restaurant, the Blackstone Valley Chamber of Commerce, office space, and a wine store.

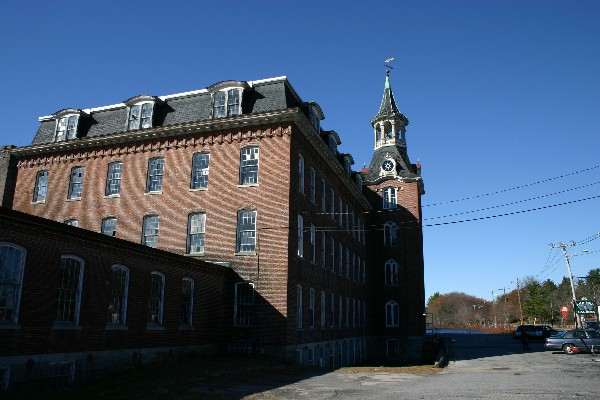
James Whitin Linwood Cotton Mill, Linwood Ave in Northbridge

Current businesses located in the Linwood Mill include the following:

- Blackstone Valley Chamber of Commerce
- Blackstone Valley Education Hub
- Blackstone Valley Heritage Corridor
- St.Camillus Adult Day Health Center
- Blackstone Valley Physical Therapy
- Major League Barber Shop
- Mill House Wine & Spirits
- MetLife
- Maison de Manger (Crêperie Restaurant)
- Fulcrum Acoustics
- Purgatory Beer Company
- Zentangle

== National Register listings ==
The Butler Block in Linwood is listed on the National Historic Register, under Uxbridge, Massachusetts. The Linwood Cotton Mills are also listed on the National Historic Register. The Linwood Historic District includes late Victorian Structures, the Linwood Cotton Mills, and extends down Linwood Avenue to Pine and Maple. The Blackstone Valley and Linwood are now part of the Blackstone River Valley National Heritage Corridor, the oldest industrialized region in the United States. The Blackstone Valley is New England's Historic National Park area. Built in 1866, the Linwood Mill was the crowning glory of James Fletcher Whitin and Charles Pinckney Whitin, sons of Colonel Paul and Betsy (Fletcher) Whitin.

== Gallery ==
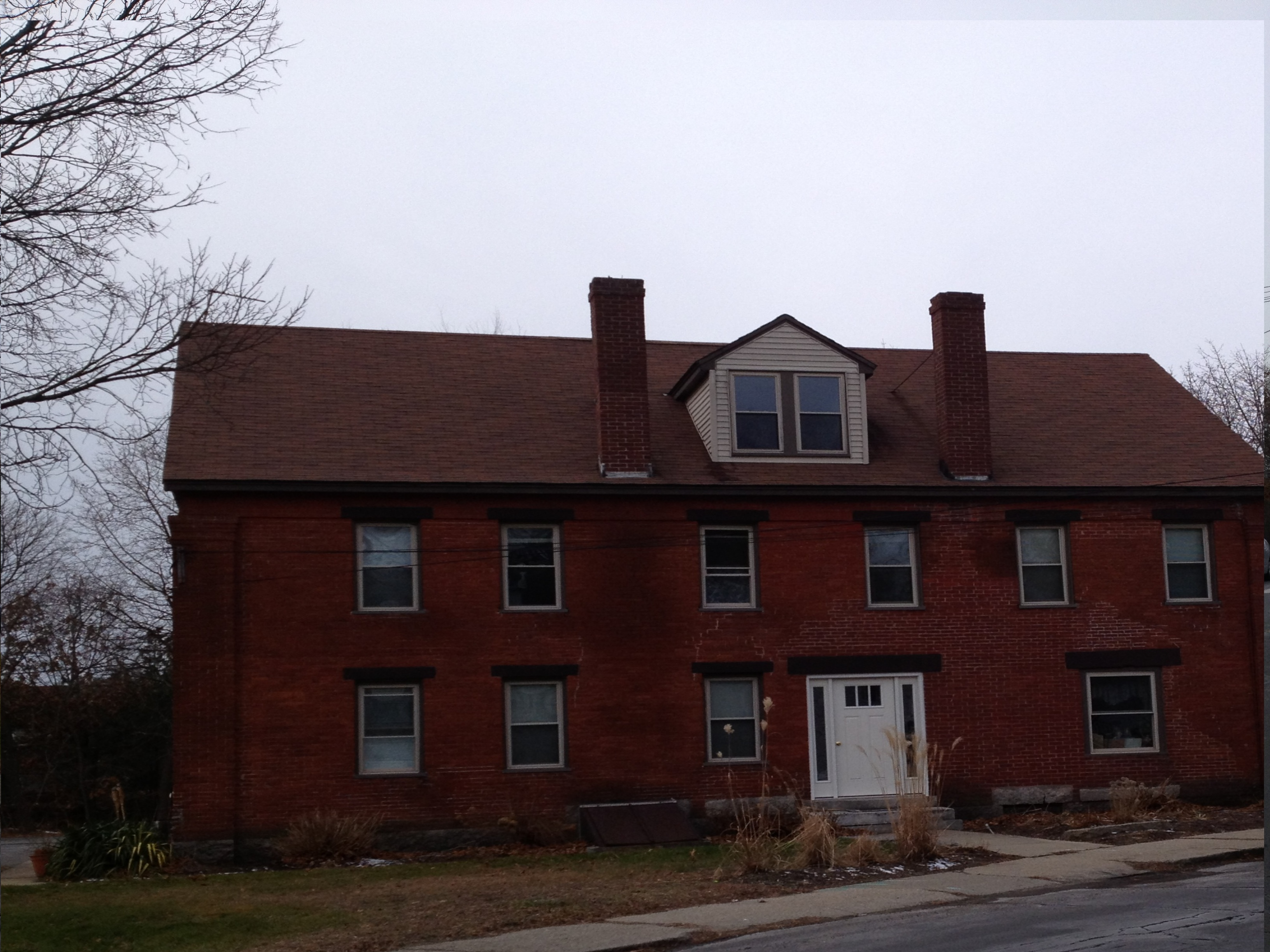
Butler Block, commercial and residential, 1800s building; part of the building houses the Linwood Post Office within the town limits of Uxbridge.

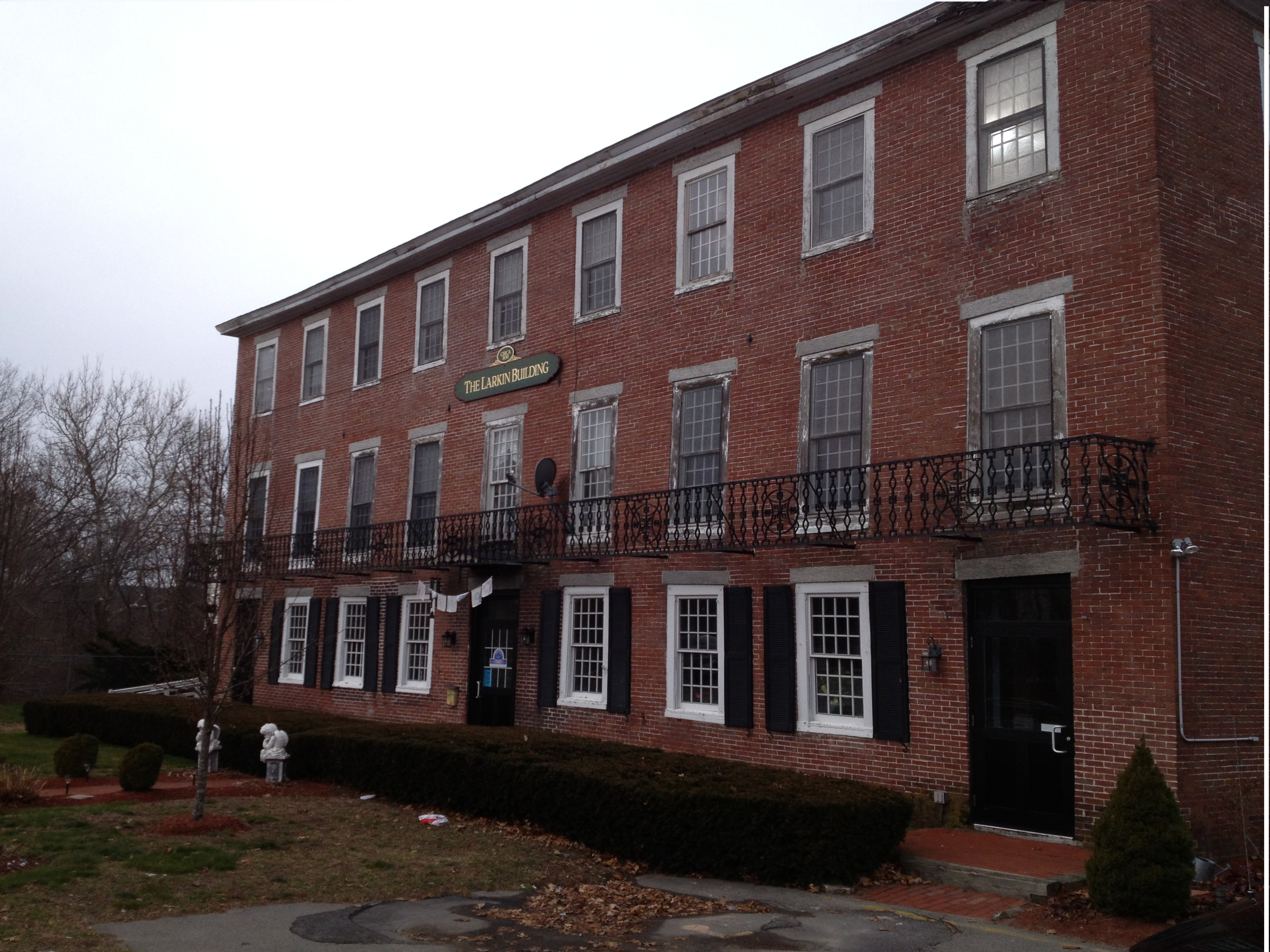
The Company Store, now known as the Larkin Building, on the edge of Linwood, at Whitin St. and East Hartford Ave. The Company Store is a part of the Rogerson Village Historic District.

== See also ==
- List of mill towns in Massachusetts
