= Rogerson's Village Historic District =

Historic district in Massachusetts, United States

- U.S. National Register of Historic Places
- U.S. Historic district
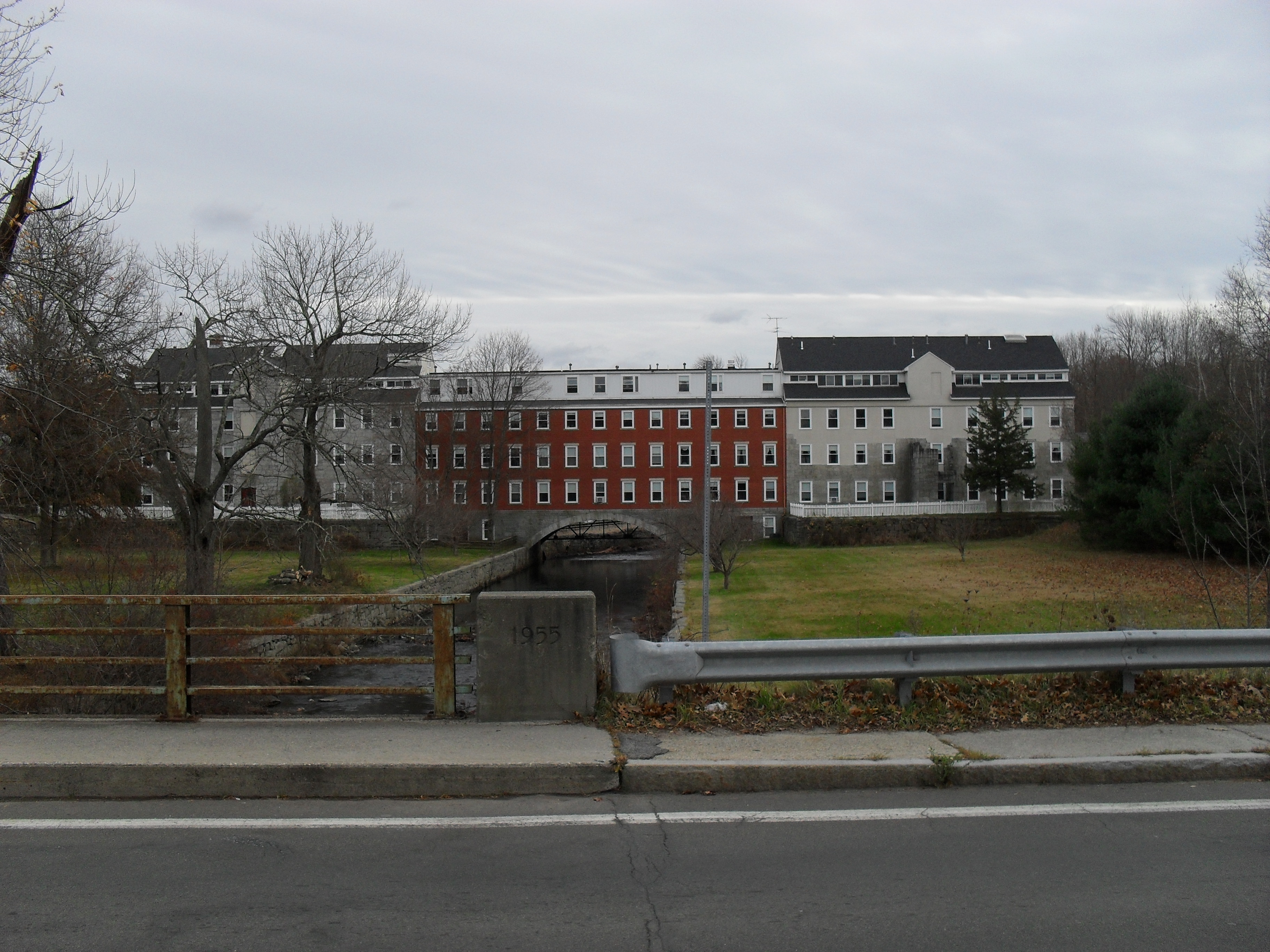
- "Rogersons Village, An early New England Mill Village, considered an architectural masterpiece"

- Location within Massachusetts Location within the United States
- Location: North Uxbridge, Massachusetts
- Coordinates: 42.09333°N 71.63556°W
- Built: 1810
- Architectural style: early American Industrial
- NRHP reference No.: 71000092
- Added to NRHP: November 23, 1971

Rogersons Village Historic District is a historic mill village in Uxbridge, Massachusetts, United States.

== The builder ==
Rogerson's Village was built by Robert Rogerson, whose parents were from England. He acquired the Clapp Mill in 1817, established on the Mumford River circa 1810, in Uxbridge, Massachusetts. This was the oldest cotton mill built in Uxbridge. It appears that he was the husband of Ann Rogerson.

== The Crown and Eagle Mills ==
Roger Rogerson then built two cotton mills at the Mumford River in Uxbridge circa 1823-1827. The mills became known as the Crown and Eagle Mills. The Crown and Eagle Mills have been written up as an architectural masterpiece of an early New England Mill Village. The Boston Globe published a summary of the Mill village in a 1971 edition. The Crown and Eagle Mills were burned around 1975. They have been restored to their former beauty and converted into Senior Housing. Rogersons village, built by Robert Rogerson is now part of the Blackstone River Valley National Heritage Corridor. The Crown Mill was named for Robert Rogerson's parent's homeland, England, and the Eagle Mill for his family's adopted nation, the U.S.

== Photos ==
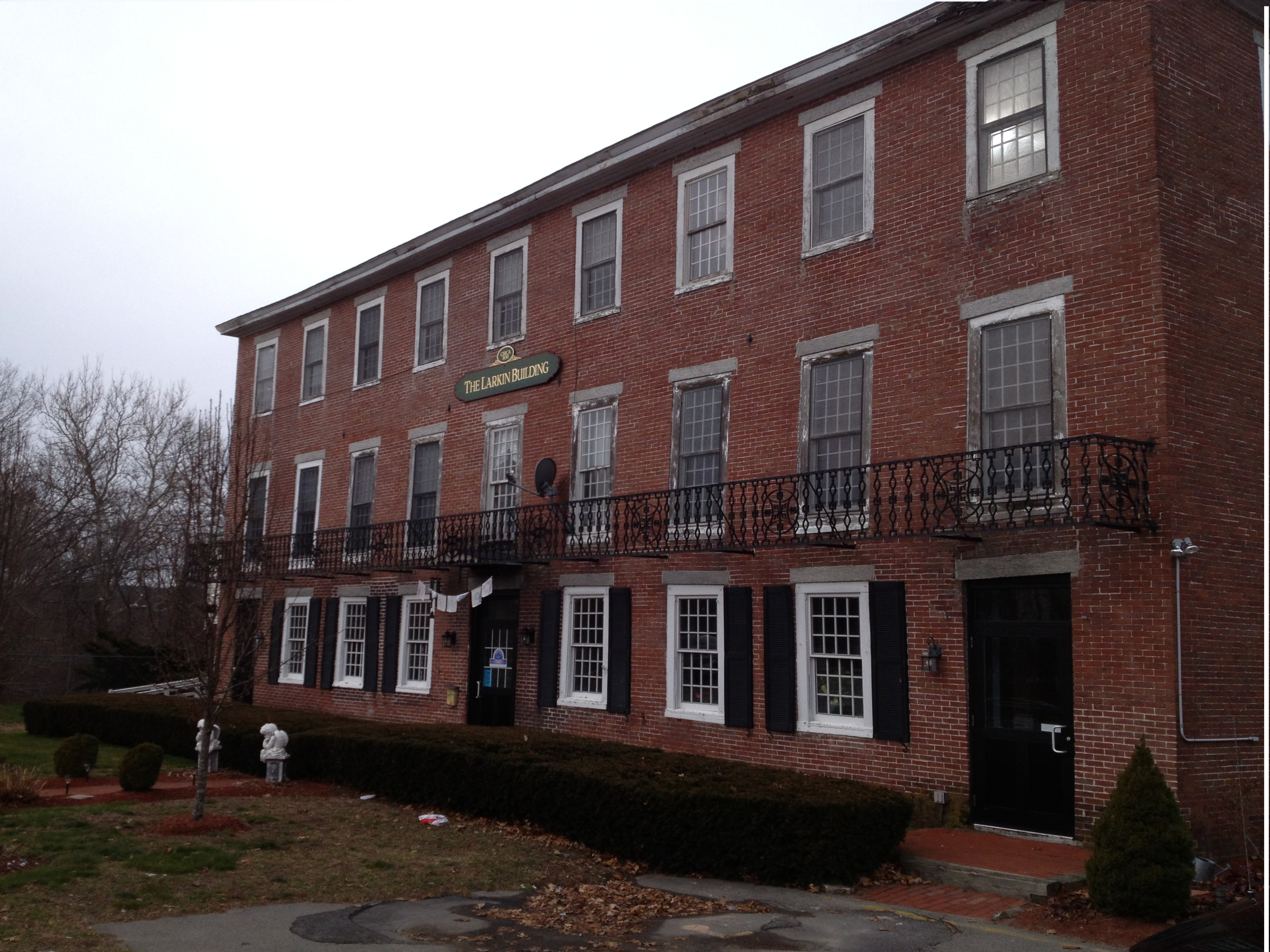
The Company Store, now known as the Larkin Building

Rogersons Village Mill worker housing circa 1824

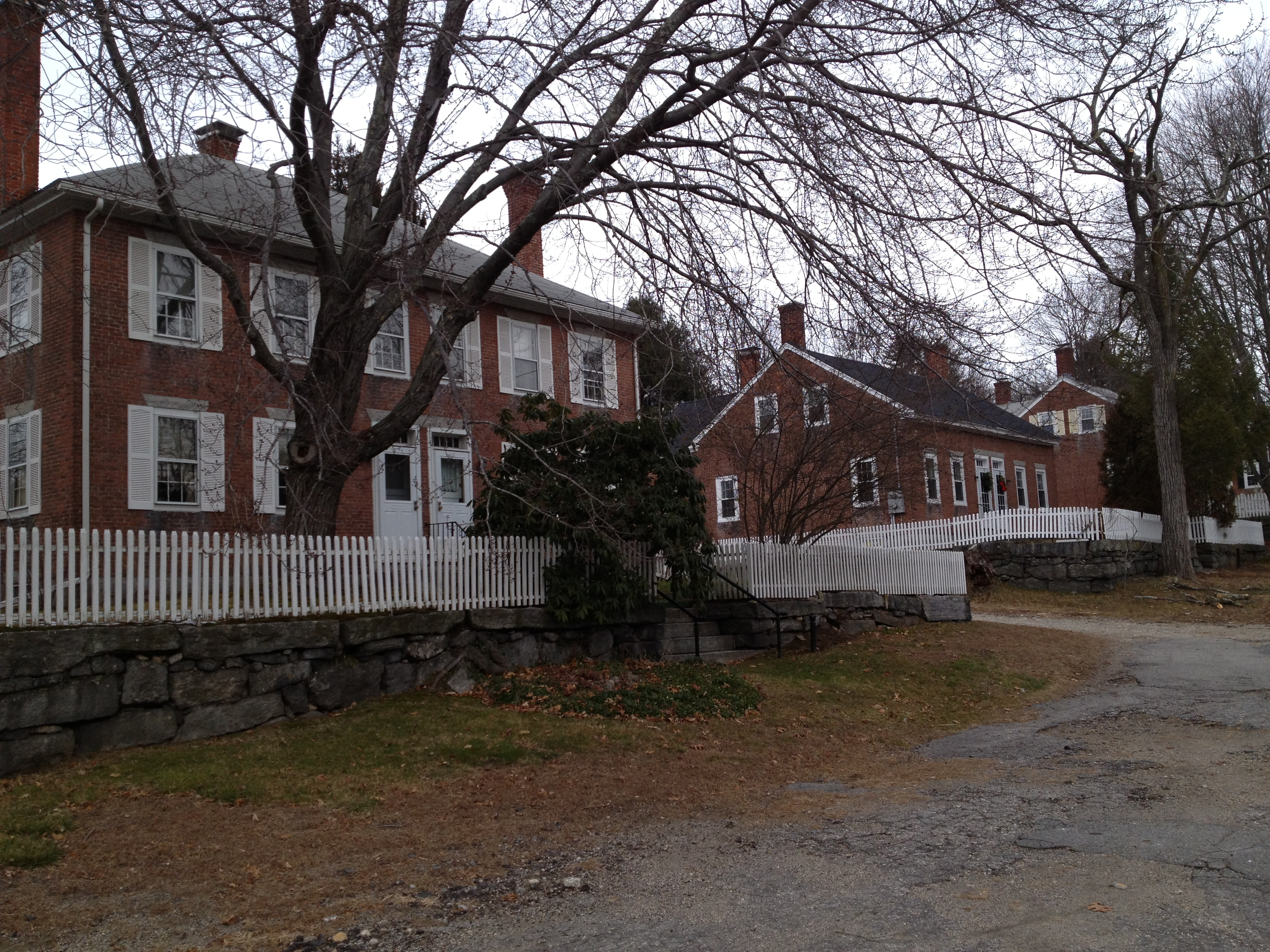
Rogersons Village Mill worker housing, Rhode Island System of Mill Villages

== Rogersons Village, other buildings ==
The mill village, the dream of Robert Rogerson, spared no expense for the mill, mansion, company store and mill worker homes. Uxbridge is in the Blackstone Valley, the earliest industrialized region in the U.S.

== Afterwards ==
It is known that Rogerson's ownership of the Crown and Eagle ended around 1837. The business had failed, and was acquired by James Whitin, and the Whitin Family, who continued to operate the mill as the Uxbridge Cotton Mills. See also Whitinsville, Massachusetts for more history references of the "Whitin Machine Works". "Rogerson's Village Historic District" is on the National Register of Historic Places.

== See also ==
- North Uxbridge - the main village nearby Rogerson's village
- Linwood, Massachusetts - within walking distance, more historic sites, and mills
- National Register of Historic Places listings in Uxbridge, Massachusetts
- List of mill towns in Massachusetts
