= Rockdale Common Housing District =

Historic district in Massachusetts, United States

- U.S. National Register of Historic Places
- U.S. Historic district
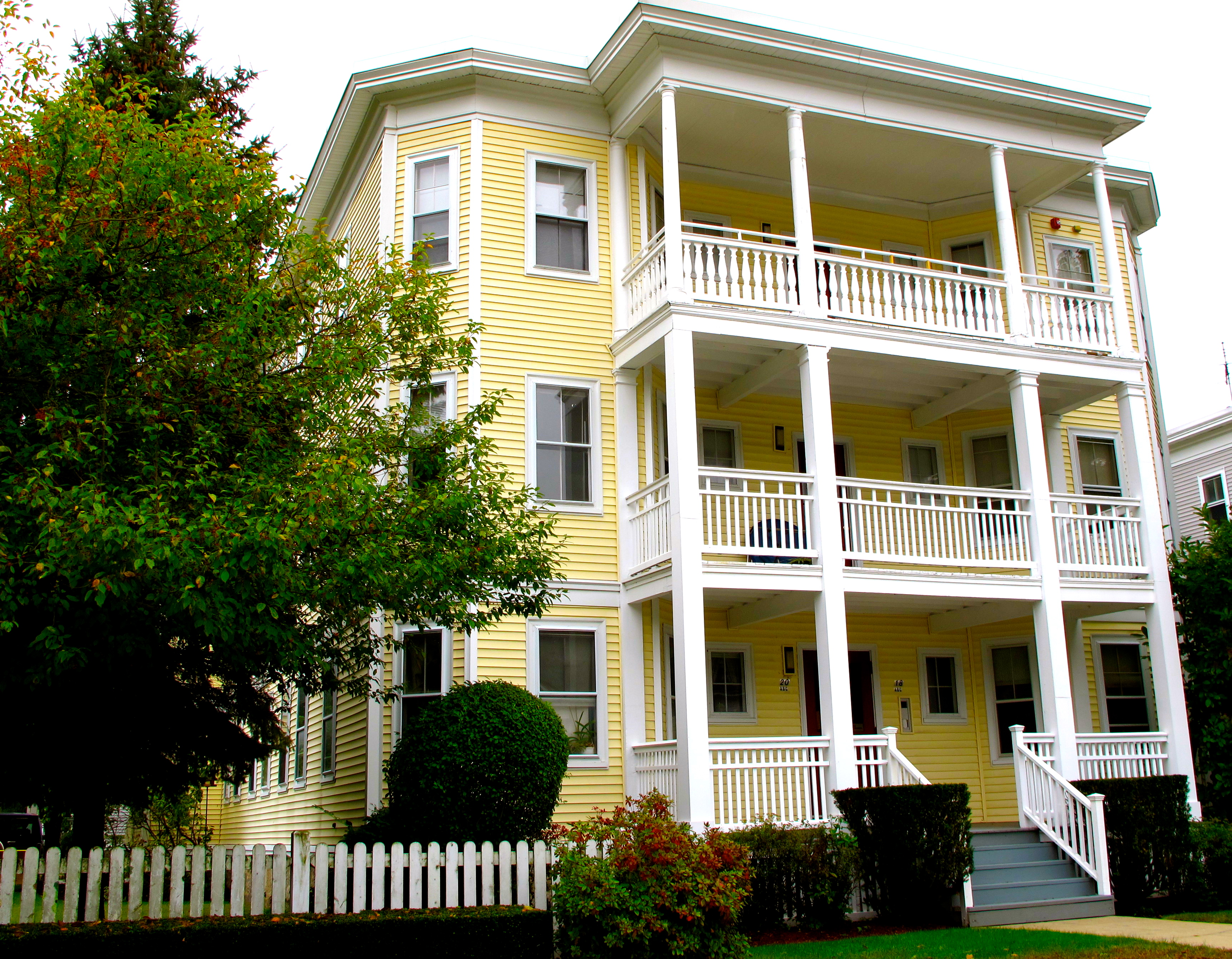

- Location within Massachusetts Location within the United States
- Location: Northbridge, Massachusetts
- Coordinates: 42°9′9″N 71°38′50″W
- Built: 1800
- Architectural style: Colonial Revival, Italianate
- NRHP reference No.: 83000611
- Added to NRHP: March 31, 1983

The Rockdale Common Housing District is a historic district at 4–20 McBride, 46–58 Plantation, and 37–42 Taft Sts. in Northbridge, Massachusetts, United States. The district is composed of a collection of tenement houses built from c. 1880 to 1920. They were built by members of the Whitin family, who owned most of the textile production capacity in Northbridge. The district was added to the National Register of Historic Places in 1983.

== Description and history ==
The village of Rockdale is one of the principal villages and former industrial centers in the central Massachusetts town of Northbridge. Its industrial history begins in 1814, but it did not become a successful industrial center until the 1860s, when the mill privilege was acquired by the Whitin family, a leading operator of textile mills in the Blackstone River valley. The Whitins attracted a reliable workforce by building housing, schools, and other community buildings for their workers. In the late 19th century an influx of French Canadians drawn to work at the mill in Rockdale prompted the company to build additional housing east of Taft Street.

The historic district includes seven residential structures built by the Paul Whitin Company between about 1880 and 1920. They are located in a single square block, bounded by Mcbride, Plantation, and Taft Streets, and Church Avenue. Two long six-unit rowhouses stand on the east side of Taft Street, larger in form than earlier tenement houses built to the west; these were built about 1915. Facing McBride and Taft Streets are four triple decker apartment blocks, housing six or twelve units. Built c. 1917, these have notable Colonial Revival styling in their front porches and polygonal window bays. Lastly, one six-unit building with Italianate styling also faces Taft Street.

The buildings continue to be used as low-income residential housing.

== See also ==
- National Register of Historic Places listings in Worcester County, Massachusetts
