= Linwood Historic District =

Linwood Historic District can refer to:

== United States ==
Places on the National Register of Historic Places

- Linwood Historic District (Northbridge, Massachusetts), listed on the NRHP in Massachusetts
- Linwood Historic District (Linwood, Maryland), listed on the NRHP in Maryland
- Linwood Historic District (Linwood, New Jersey), listed on the NRHP in New Jersey
- Linwood Historic District (Buffalo, New York), part of the City of Buffalo landmarks and historic districts
