= Linwood Historic District (Northbridge, Massachusetts) =

Historic district in Massachusetts, United States

- U.S. National Register of Historic Places
- U.S. Historic district
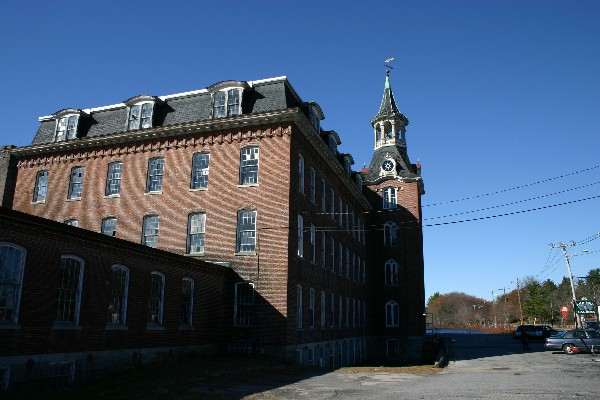
- Linwood Cotton Mill

- Location within Massachusetts Location within the United States
- Location: Northbridge, Massachusetts
- Coordinates: 42°5′54″N 71°38′49″W
- Built: 1866
- Architectural style: Second Empire, Late Victorian
- NRHP reference No.: 88002753
- Added to NRHP: June 16, 1989

The Linwood Historic District is an industrial historic district in the Linwood village of Northbridge, Massachusetts. It is the site of the Linwood Cotton Mill and is roughly bounded by Linwood Avenue, Maple Court, and Pine Court. On June 16, 1989, it was added to the National Register of Historic Places.

The Linwood Mill was built in 1866 by members of the Whitin family, who had purchased land in the area in the late 1840s. The Whitins had a history in the textile industry dating as far back as 1809, and are for whom the Northbridge village of Whitinsville is named. At the time of Linwood's development they owned virtually all of the textile industry in Northbridge. The Linwood property was built to process cotton, and produced cambrics, sateens, and shirting fabric. The original mill was a 3 1/2-story brick structure, which was expanded c. 1870 with the addition of a steam power plant in order to increase production. From the 1870s, the only other surviving building is a brick storehouse.

The mill complex, in addition to industrial facilities, also included worker housing. The district includes the fine Second Empire proprietor's residence, carriage house, and greenhouse, as well as a selection of tenement houses, dormitories, and duplexes built by the Whitins to house the factory workers. The mill complex is the best preserved of those built by the Whitins; the others have either been altered significantly, or been damaged or destroyed by fire.

== See also ==
- National Register of Historic Places listings in Worcester County, Massachusetts
