= List of mill towns in Massachusetts =

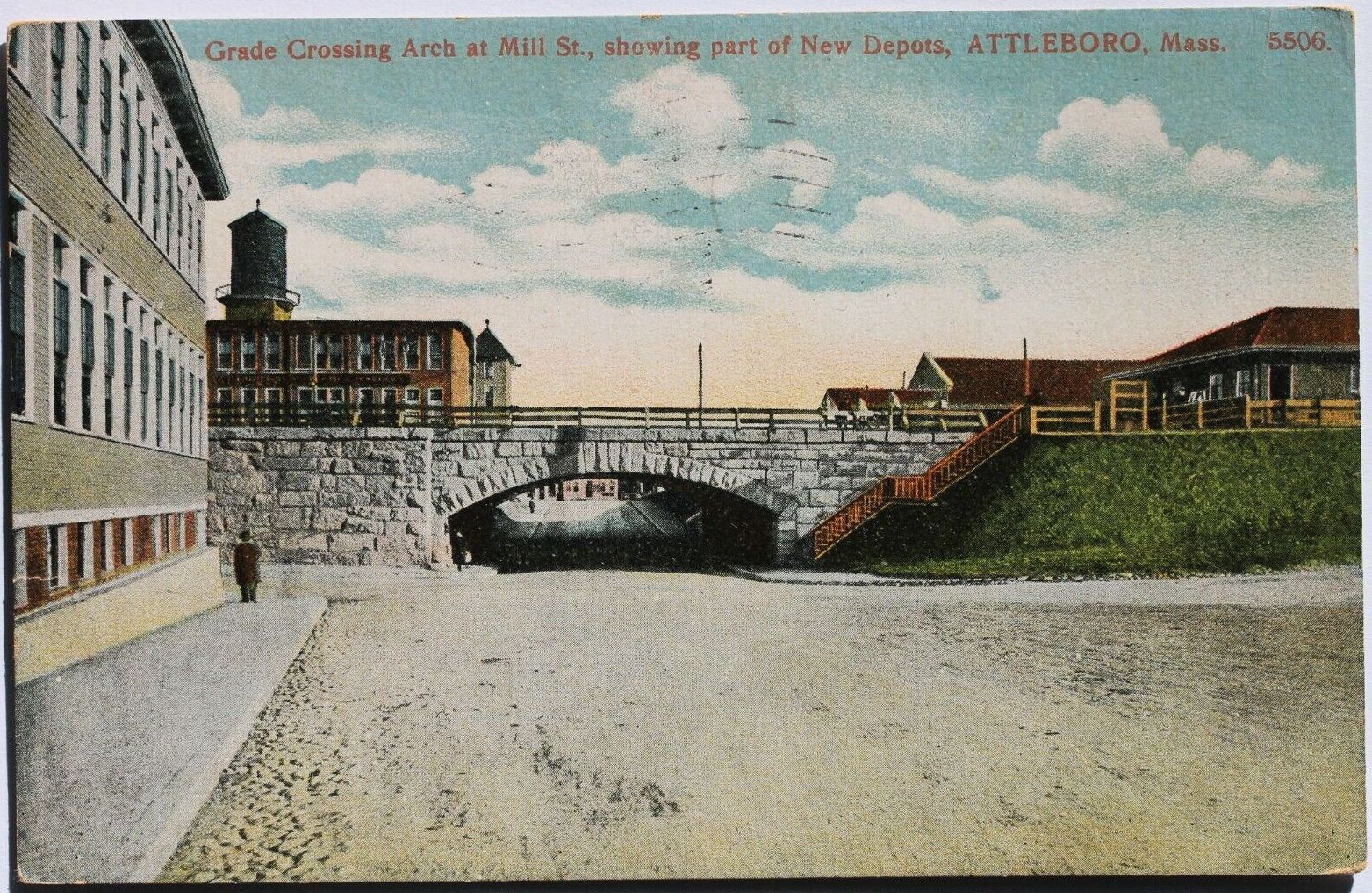
Mill Street, Attleboro, MA in 1908

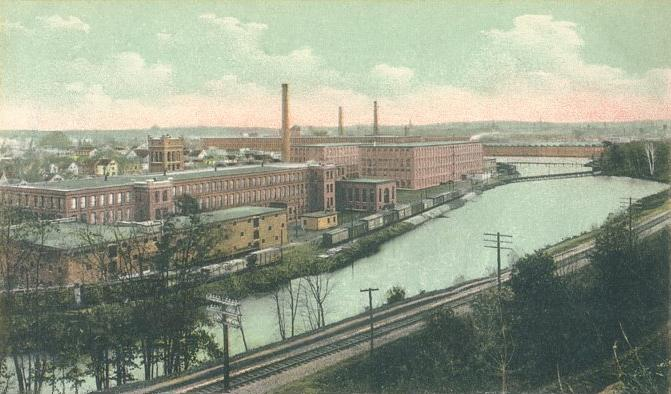
Arlington Mills, Lawrence, MA in 1907

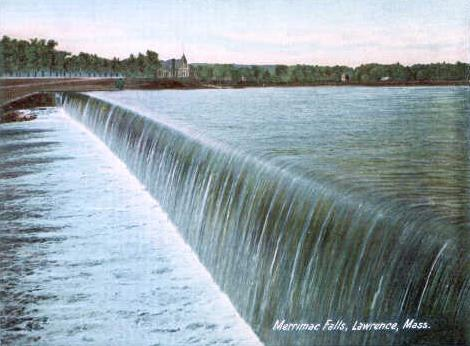
Merrimack Falls, Lawrence, MA in c. 1905

This is a list of mill towns in Massachusetts. Mill towns as described here are not expressly towns that had mills in them but, rather, (mostly former) company towns which depend or depended heavily on one or more millstone gristmills and after the industrial revolution, mass production of goods, that most or all residents were dependent on as an economic engine.

For example, Lowell is nationally renowned for its numerous historic mill complexes, but along with Easthampton and a handful of others such as Greenfield unique for their preservation of the same as an industry and labor museums dedicated to teaching the shared history of an boom that fueled the growth of the country's economy yet also inflicted gruesome abuses on workers so numerous that it necessitated the creation of the very first successful Labor unions in the United States.

The egress of the mills left numerous large empty factory complexes and economically depressed communities in its wake, something some of these towns, such as Ware, MA have yet to fully recover, whilst in other more diversified economies such as Amherst and Northampton in the Knowledge Corridor with their numerous Colleges and large State University, places such as 'Factory Pond' in Amherst are now known as 'Puffer's Pond' with little recollection of the mills that once stood there, and are thus not considered 'Mill Towns' in the same way as nearby Orange and Athol, Massachusetts.

== List ==
- Adams
- Amesbury
- Athol
- Attleboro
- Chicopee
- Clinton
- Dalton
- Dedham
- Fall River
- Fitchburg
- Framingham
- Gardner
- Grafton
- Greenfield
- Haverhill
- Holyoke
- Hopedale
- Hudson
- Lawrence
- Lowell
- Ludlow
- Lynn
- Maynard
- Medford
- Merrimac
- Methuen
- Milford
- Millbury
- Monson
- New Bedford
- North Adams
- North Andover
- Northbridge
- Orange
- Palmer
- Pittsfield
- Rowley
- Russell
- Southbridge
- Taunton
- Uxbridge
- Waltham
- Ware
- Webster
- Westborough
- Westford
- Winchendon
- Worcester

== Mill villages and districts in Massachusetts ==
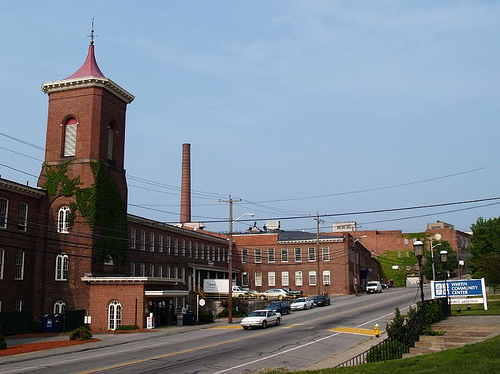
Northbridge "The Shop" (Whitinsville)

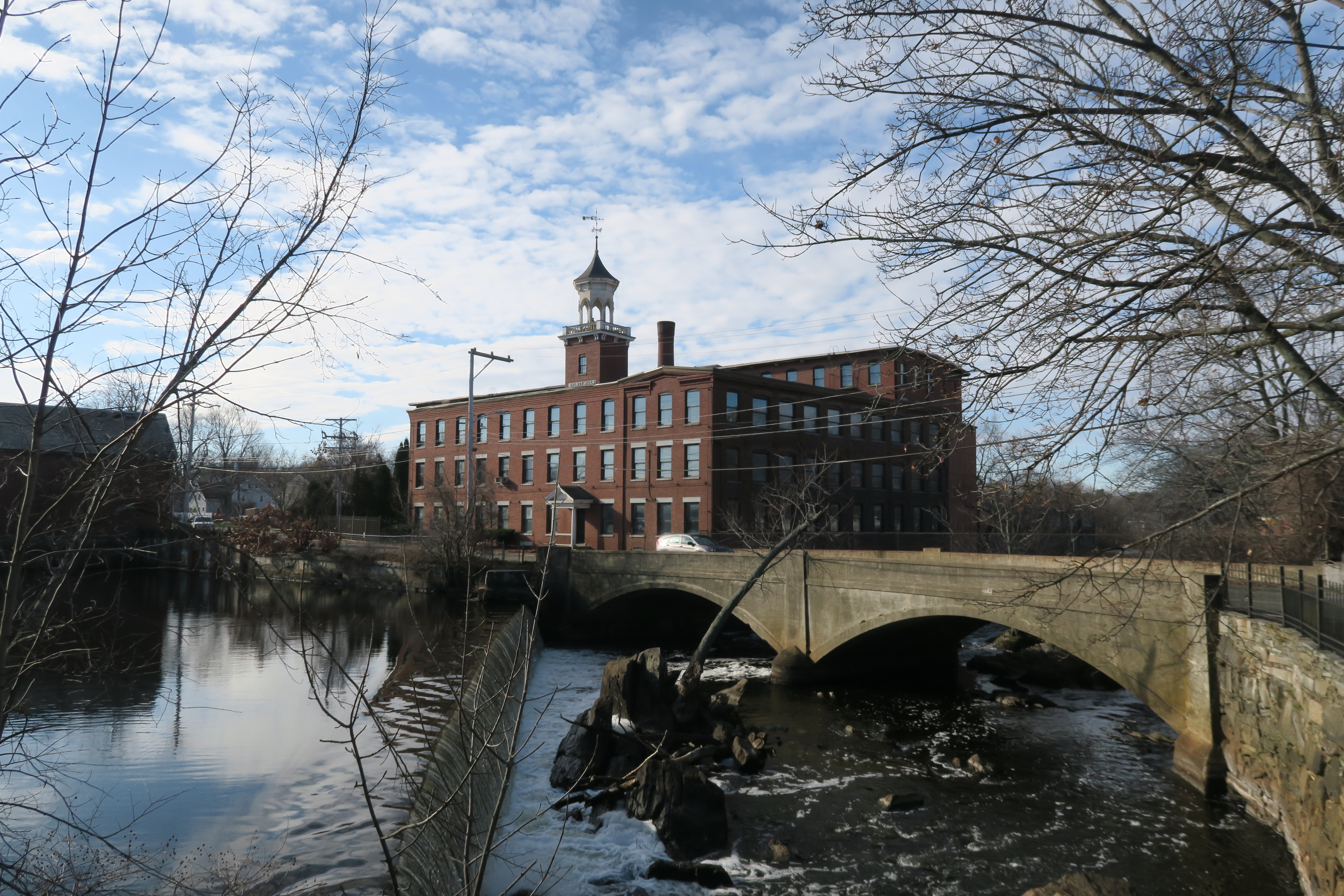
Old Talbot Mills, North Billerica

- Acushnet Heights Historic District – historic village district in New Bedford
- Ballardvale, Massachusetts – a village in Andover
- Bondsville, Massachusetts – a village in Palmer
- Bradford, Massachusetts – a village in Haverhill
- Brookside, Massachusetts – a village in Westford
- Cabotville Common Historic District – a historic mill district in Chicopee
- Central New Bedford Historic District – historic village district in New Bedford
- Church Street Historic District – located in Ware
- Dwight Manufacturing Company Housing District – a historic mill district in Chicopee
- Farnumsville Historic District – unincorporated mill village in Grafton
- Fisherville Historic District – unincorporated mill village in Grafton
- Forge Village, Massachusetts – a village in Westford
- Gilbertville, Massachusetts – a village in Hardwick
- Gleasondale, Massachusetts– a village between Hudson and Stow, but is now primarily residential.
- Graniteville, Massachusetts – a village in Westford
- Hamilton Woolen Company Historic District – historic mill district in Southbridge
- Howland Mill Village Historic District – historic village district in New Bedford
- Indian Orchard, now a neighborhood of Springfield. The remainder of Springfield was never a "mill town," but rather oriented toward precision manufacturing, (e.g. the Springfield Armory.)
- Ironstone, Massachusetts (also known as South Uxbridge) – a historic village in Uxbridge
- Linwood, Massachusetts – mill village in Northbridge
- North Uxbridge, Massachusetts – a village within Uxbridge
- North Chelmsford, Massachusetts – a historic mill district within Chelmsford, Massachusetts
- North Billerica, Massachusetts – a historic mill district within Billerica, Massachusetts
- Rogerson's Village Historic District – a historic mill district in Uxbridge
- South Barre, Massachusetts – a village in Barre
- Turners Falls, Massachusetts – a village in Montague, Massachusetts
- Three Rivers, Massachusetts – a village in Palmer
- Upton-West Upton, Massachusetts – home to Knowlton Hat Factory
- Ware Millyard Historic District – a historic district located in Ware
- Weir Village, Massachusetts – a village in Taunton
- Wheelockville, Massachusetts and the Wheelockville District – located within Uxbridge
- Whitinsville, Massachusetts – mill village in Northbridge

== See also ==
- Mill town
- Lowell Mill Girls
- Industrial Revolution
