= Paul Whitin =

American blacksmith and industrialist (1767–1831)

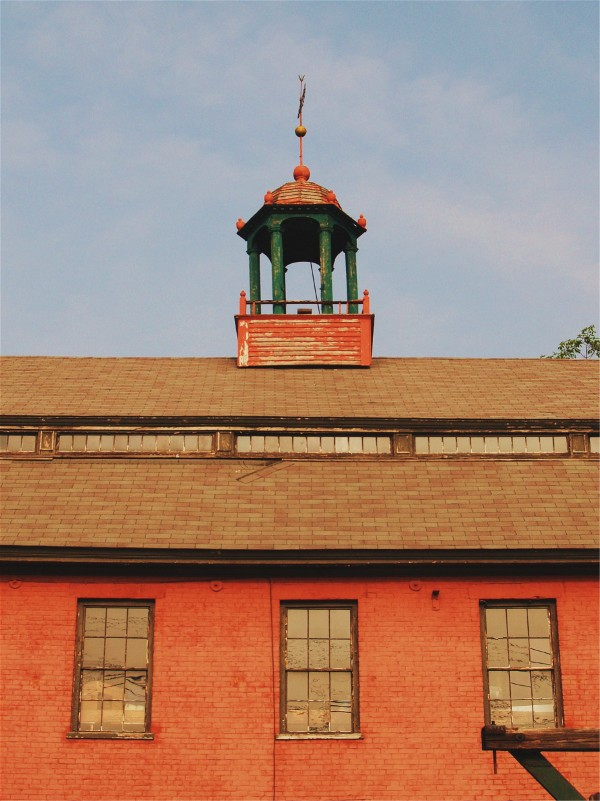
- 1826 Brick Mill, Whitinsville, built by Whitin
- Born: 1767; Roxbury, Province of Massachusetts, British America
- Died: 1831 (aged 63–64)
- Occupations: Blacksmith, industrialist

Paul Whitin (1767 – 1831) was an American blacksmith and pioneering industrialist who in 1826 in Northbridge, Massachusetts established P Whitin and Sons, a new cotton mill with his sons. This company would grow and acquire other mills in the area. In 1831 his son John C Whitin obtained a patent for a mechanized Cotton Picker. Textile machinery would become a larger percentage of their business over time. It would later become the largest maker of specialty textile machinery in the world.

== Early life ==
Whitin was born in 1767 in Roxbury, Boston as Paul Whiting to Nathaniel and Sarah (Draper) Whiting . He began his career as an apprentice in Colonel James Fletcher's forge in South Northbridge. In 1793, he married Fletcher's daughter, Elizabeth (Betsey) Fletcher at which time he changed his name by dropping the “g”. They would have eight children, including five sons.

Whitin and four of his sons and their descendants would become very influential in the development of the textile industry in the Blackstone Valley area during the 19th Century, establishing or acquiring several mills throughout the Blackstone Valley area, including ones at Uxbridge, Linwood, Riverdale and Rockdale. It was the Whitin Machine Works however, which would have the greatest impact on the area and the textile industry.

In 1835, the village of South Northbridge became known as Whitinsville in his honor.

== Pioneer of industry ==
In 1809, Whitin and his father-in-law James Fletcher and others from Northbridge and Leicester, established the Northbridge Cotton Manufacturing Company. This wood-framed spinning mill, two and one-half stories high had 200 spindles and was only the third cotton mill in the Blackstone Valley at the time.

In 1815, Whitin became a partner with Colonel Fletcher, Betsey's father, and his two brothers-in-law, Samuel and Ezra Fletcher, under the firm name of Whitin and Fletcher. Then they built a second mill with 300 spindles on the opposite side of the Mumford River. Paul Whitin then bought out the Fletcher shares in 1826 and formed a new partnership with his two sons, Paul Jr. and John Crane Whitin. The new company was called Paul Whitin and Sons. Also in 1826, a new brick mill was constructed, having 2000 spindles, which still stands today at Whitinsville, having been recently restored. The 1826 brick mill is perhaps the oldest surviving, unaltered textile mill remaining in Massachusetts. Colonel Fletcher's 1772 Blacksmith Forge is also still standing, next to the Brick Mill, on the west bank of the Mumford River.

Whitin died in 1831, aged 63 or 64. Later, with the cotton business on a solid basis and escalating in 1845, Betsey Whitin and her sons built a new, stone textile factory, largely of granite known as the Whitinsville Cotton Mill, which gave the family business 7,500 more spindles. The Whitinsville Cotton Mill would later be used as a testing facility for new equipment developed by the Whitin Machine Works, across the street. This is now called the restored Cotton Mill Apartments, in Whitinsville.
