= George Chidi =

American journalist

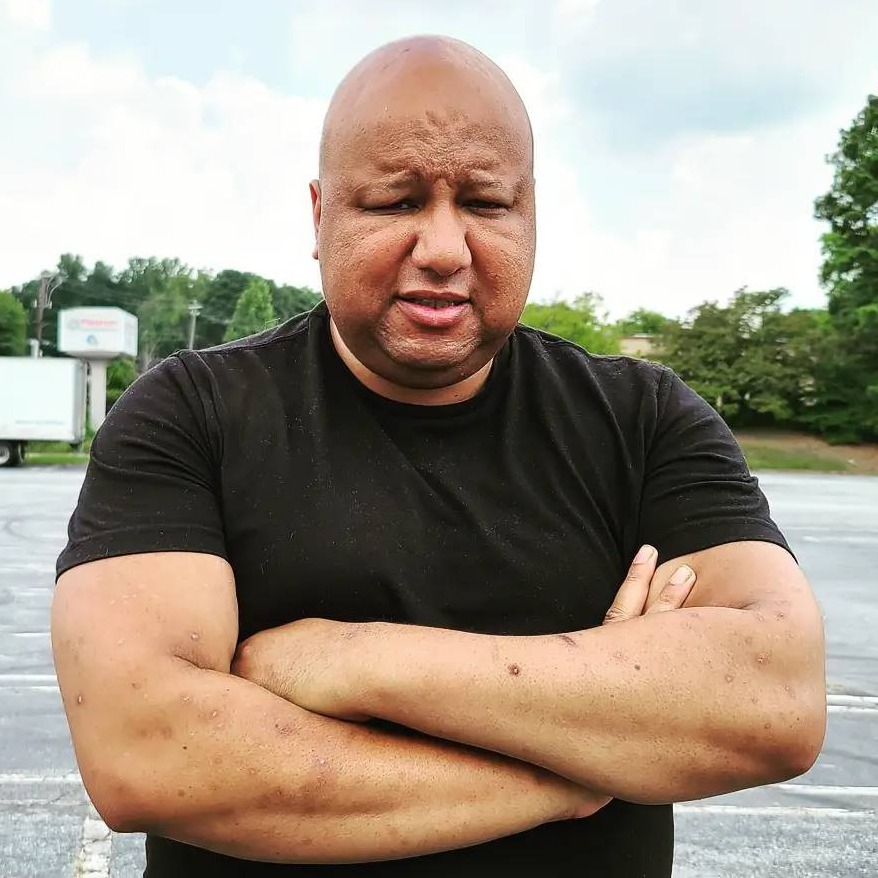
- Born: George Amaefule Njoku Chidi Jr. March 31, 1973 (age 53)
- Education: University of Massachusetts at Amherst (BA); Georgia Tech (MBA)
- Occupations: Journalist; political commentator; podcaster
- Years active: 1995-present
- Employers: The Guardian US (2024–present); Central Atlanta Progress (2015–2019)

George Amaefule Njoku Chidi Jr. (born March 31, 1973) is an American journalist and political figure, currently writing for The Guardian in the United States.

Chidi is best known for reporting on the politics and social issues of race and criminal justice in Atlanta, coverage of the YSL Records racketeering trial, and his role as a witness in the 2020 Georgia election racketeering prosecution of Donald Trump.

== Early life and education ==
George Chidi was born in Worcester, Massachusetts. His father is a Nigerian-American immigrant and physician, while his mother is an American of French-Canadian and Polish descent. Chidi grew up in nearby Northbridge, Massachusetts, graduating from Northbridge High School. He earned a bachelor's degree in journalism from the University of Massachusetts at Amherst in 2000. He was the first news director for future CNN host Audie Cornish while working as news director for WMUA. Chidi earned an MBA from Georgia Tech in 2010.

== Military service ==
Chidi served from 1994 to 1999 in the U.S. Army as an enlisted military photojournalist and reporter, primarily with the 25th Infantry Division. Chidi was an observer on the Multinational Force and Observers mission in Sinai Peninsula, Egypt in 1996. He left the Army as a specialist.

== Journalism career ==
His civilian career began with work as a tech journalist for the International Data Group—publisher of Computerworld—during the crash of the dot-com bubble. Chidi has written for CNN.com, Network World Fusion, the Rocky Mount Telegram, the Atlanta Journal-Constitution, Inc.(magazine), Decaturish, The Intercept, Rolling Stone, Atlanta Magazine, Slate and other publications. Chidi is currently a staff writer for The Guardian’s U.S. wing, covering politics and the issue of democracy.

=== Reporting in Atlanta ===
A profile George Chidi wrote in October 2014 about a far-right political candidate in DeKalb County became a highly publicized First Amendment incident after the subject filed a temporary protective order, accusing him of stalking. A judge quickly lifted the order.

George Chidi hosted a quarterly civic affairs news program—The Next Atlanta—on Fox 5 Atlanta from 2020 to 2023, which earned an Emmy nomination in 2022.

While covering the armed takeover of the site of the Rayshard Brooks shooting in south Atlanta, two weeks before the murder of Secoriea Turner, Chidi was assaulted by several members of the group.

George Chidi’s reporting for the Substack newsletter The Atlanta Objective, covering the causes and political implications of rising crime in Atlanta during the COVID-19 pandemic, earned the Society for Professional Journalists’s public service award in 2021 and a Good Trouble honor from Atlanta’s Center for Civic Innovation

=== 2020 election interference investigation ===
George Chidi attracted national attention after witnessing and documenting a December 2020 gathering of Republican "fake electors" at the Georgia capitol. As a result, he was subpoenaed twice before grand juries investigating alleged election interference.

=== State of Georgia vs. Jeffery Williams ===
In the months preceding the arrest of Jeffery “Young Thug” Williams on racketeering and gang charges, George Chidi wrote a series of stories describing a gang war between the YSL and YFN street gangs in Atlanta that Fulton County prosecutors had described in court filings. Chidi’s explanations of the details of the case drew media attention from the hip-hop blogosphere, with two appearances on DJ Vlad’s YouTube channel. With hip-hop reporter Christina Lee, Chidi launched the King Slime podcast covering what became the longest trial in Georgia history. The podcast was nominated for an Ambie award in 2024.

== Political career ==
George Chidi ran as an independent candidate for a state house seat in Massachusetts in 2002, losing to Jeffrey Sanchez. Chidi served two partial terms as a city councilman for the town of Pine Lake, Ga., winning a uncontested special election in 2010 and a nonpartisan contested election in 2013. Chidi resigned in April 2016 to run for a county commission seat in DeKalb County, losing to Gregory Adams.

== Personal life ==
George Chidi is married to author and college instructor Sara Amis. He is the half-brother of wellness expert and Goop podcast co-host Erica Chidi.

== See also ==
- The Guardian
- Trump fake electors plot
- American journalism
- Political journalism
- Multinational Force and Observers
