= North Uxbridge, Massachusetts =

- Village
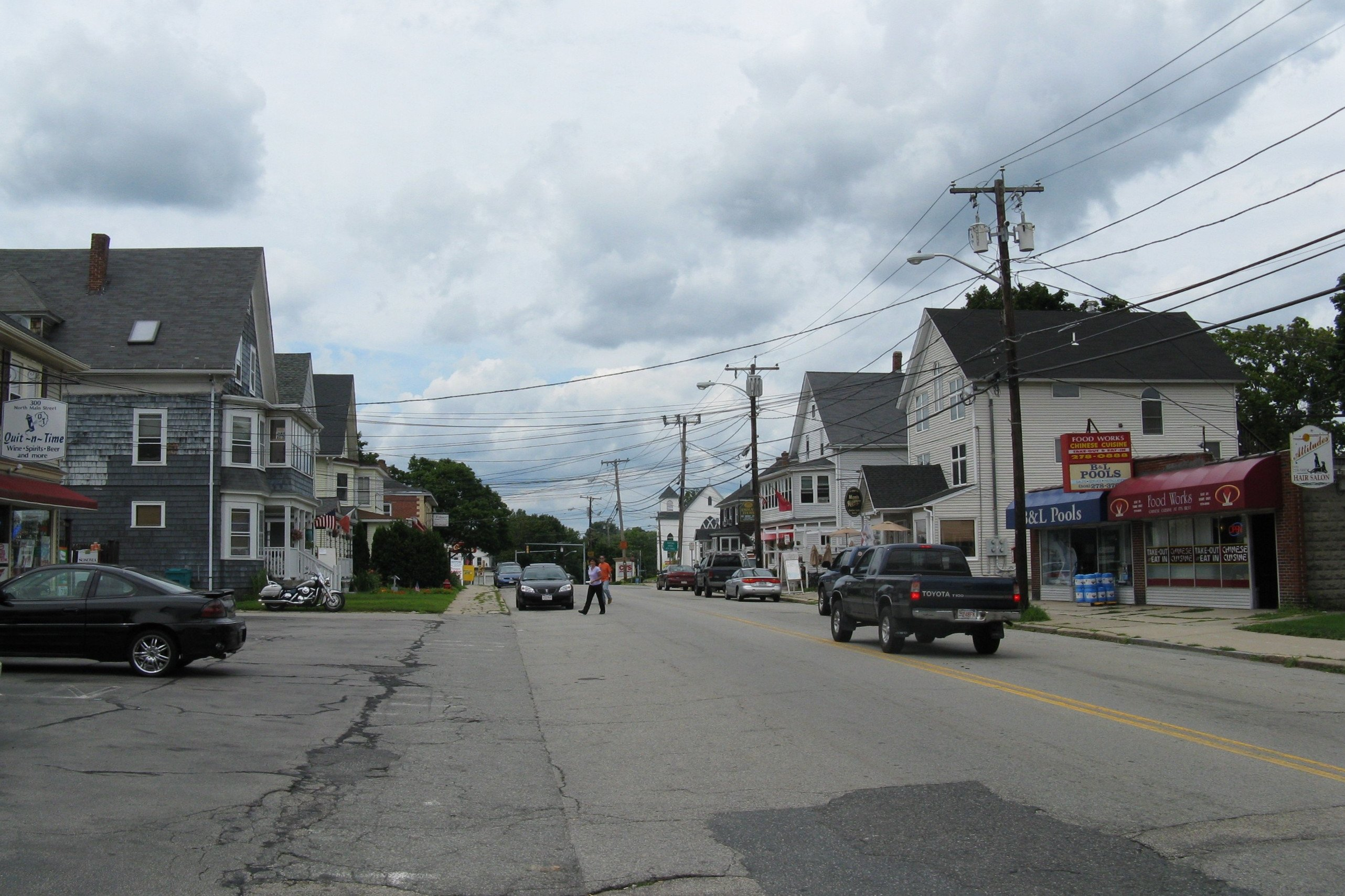
- North Uxbridge, Business District

- Location within Massachusetts Location within the United States
- Coordinates: 42°05′15″N 71°38′28″W
- Country: United States
- State: Massachusetts
- County: Worcester
- Elevation: 266 ft (81 m)
- Time zone: UTC-5 (Eastern (EST))
  - Summer (DST): UTC-4 (EDT)
- ZIP code: 01538
- GNIS feature ID: 611038

North Uxbridge is a village and a post office in the town (township) of Uxbridge in Worcester County, Massachusetts, United States. The postal zip code is 01538. It is classified as a community or populated place (Class Code U6) located at latitude 42.088 and longitude -71.641 and the elevation is 266 feet (81 m). North Uxbridge appears on the Uxbridge U.S. Geological Survey Map. Worcester County is in the Eastern time zone (GMT -5) and observes DST. North Uxbridge is located approximately 36 miles west-southwest of Boston, and 15 miles southeast of Worcester. The town meeting in 1885 set aside North Uxbridge as a "special district", since its population had exceeded 1000 people. North Uxbridge appeared as a separate Census tract in the 1960 census, with a population of 1882. In 2013, an Uxbridge DIY show, The Garage, with Steve Butler, went worldwide from Steve's garage in North Uxbridge.

== Description of the village ==
North Uxbridge, the main northern village of the town, is also known as the "north end". The village receives municipal services from Uxbridge, for fire, police, emergency medical services, school district, public works, and other services. Worcester's Judicial District includes Uxbridge District Court. There was a North Uxbridge fire station Number 2, of the Uxbridge Fire Department. It now serves as the Fire Museum. The commercial district includes a CVS pharmacy, small shops, businesses and restaurants. The Cornerstone Church (the former North Uxbridge Baptist Church) is a well known icon in the downtown area of the village. The village is no longer recognized as a separate census-designated place but is considered part of Uxbridge by the US Census bureau. Major employers include the local school district, and a commercial plastics manufacturing company in the former Rivulet mill. Residential construction has grown substantially in the last 20 years. The former North Uxbridge elementary school was also the Virginia Blanchard Pre-K Center, and is a historic building.

== Historic features ==
The village is home to the historic Rogerson Village built by Robert Rogerson in the 1820s. This village contains the Crown and Eagle Mills, considered an architectural masterpiece of an early New England mill village with worker housing and a water-powered cotton mill. This system of water-powered mills, driven by dams, with spillways, and surrounded by mill villages, became known as "The Rhode Island System". North Uxbridge had other historic mills such as the Rivulet Mill and Richard Sayles Mills, originally built by Chandler Taft in 1814, and the Clapp Mill (1810). Blanchard School and a number of other historic sites here such as Samuel Taft House, and the A. Whipple House, are listed on the Federal Register of historic places. It was also home to the Blanchard Granite quarry from which was mined large quantities of granite known throughout the Eastern United States. Blanchard's quarry supplied Boston's reconstruction after its 1872 fire and sold New York City its curbstones. The North Uxbridge School, or Virginia A. Blanchard School, is on the register of Historic Places (see also below), as is the Rogerson's Village. The village is part of the Blackstone River Valley National Heritage Corridor of Massachusetts and Rhode Island which is part of the National Park Service. The Blackstone River Valley is the oldest industrialized region in the United States. North Uxbridge borders Linwood and Northbridge. Mendon is to the East. Douglas is to the west. French Canadian Linwood's cotton mill and Robert Rogerson' masterpiece Crown and Eagle Cotton Mill were near Italian North Uxbridge's Rivulet Mill.

== Recent history ==
In the late 20th century, the former James Whitin Estate, also known as "GrayRock", served as an exclusive substance abuse treatment facility. Famous individuals receiving treatment included Joan Kennedy (the first wife of the late US Massachusetts Senator Ted Kennedy), and actress Amanda Blake, (who played Miss Kitty, on Gunsmoke). This estate burned in a major fire a few years later. Blanchard school has been renovated for low income housing and a nearby subdivision created, known as Rogerson’s crossing.

== Industrial era photos ==
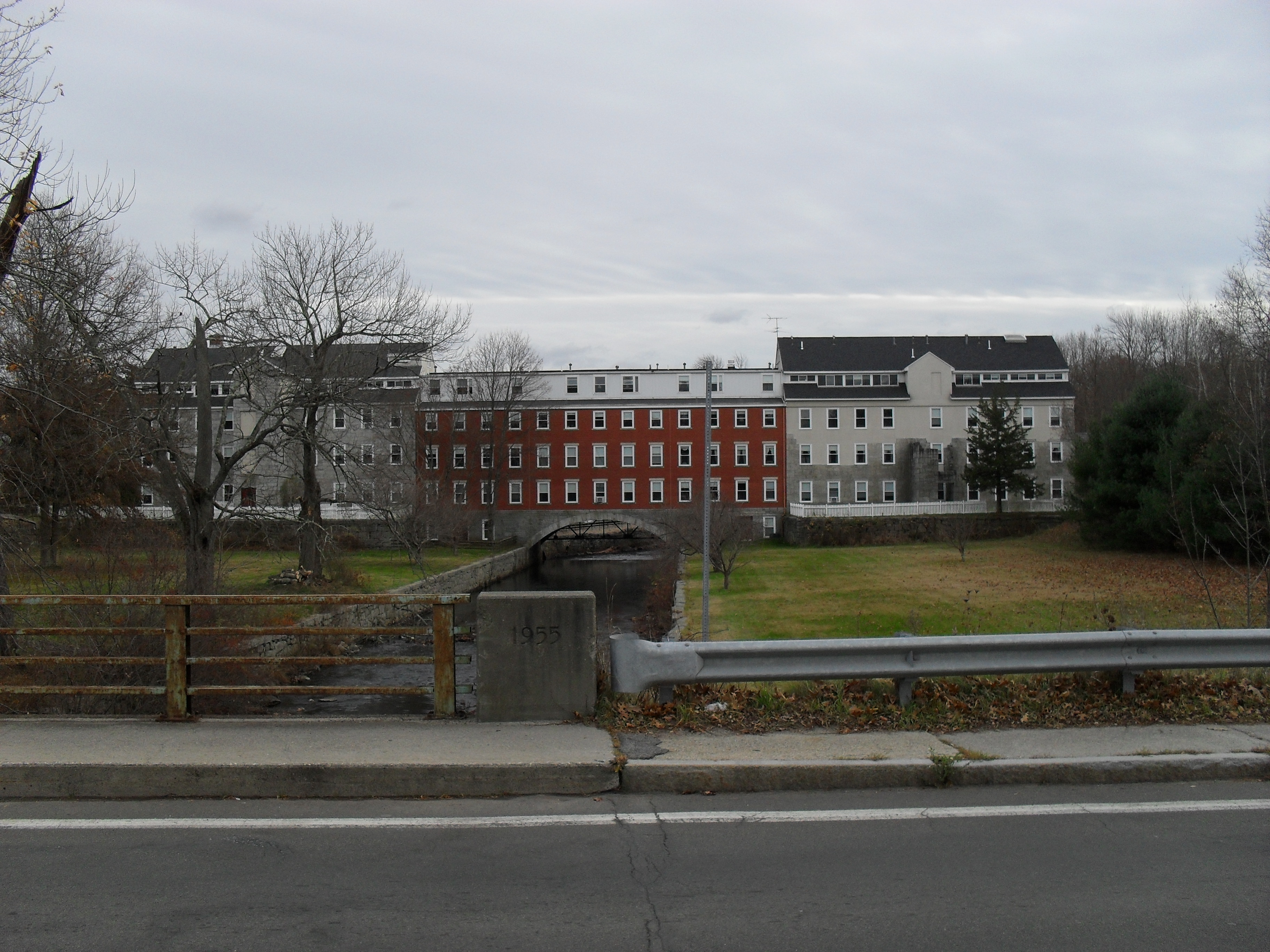
Crown & Eagle Mill, built in 1824 by Robert Rogerson, and is considered a masterpiece of early American Industrial architecture

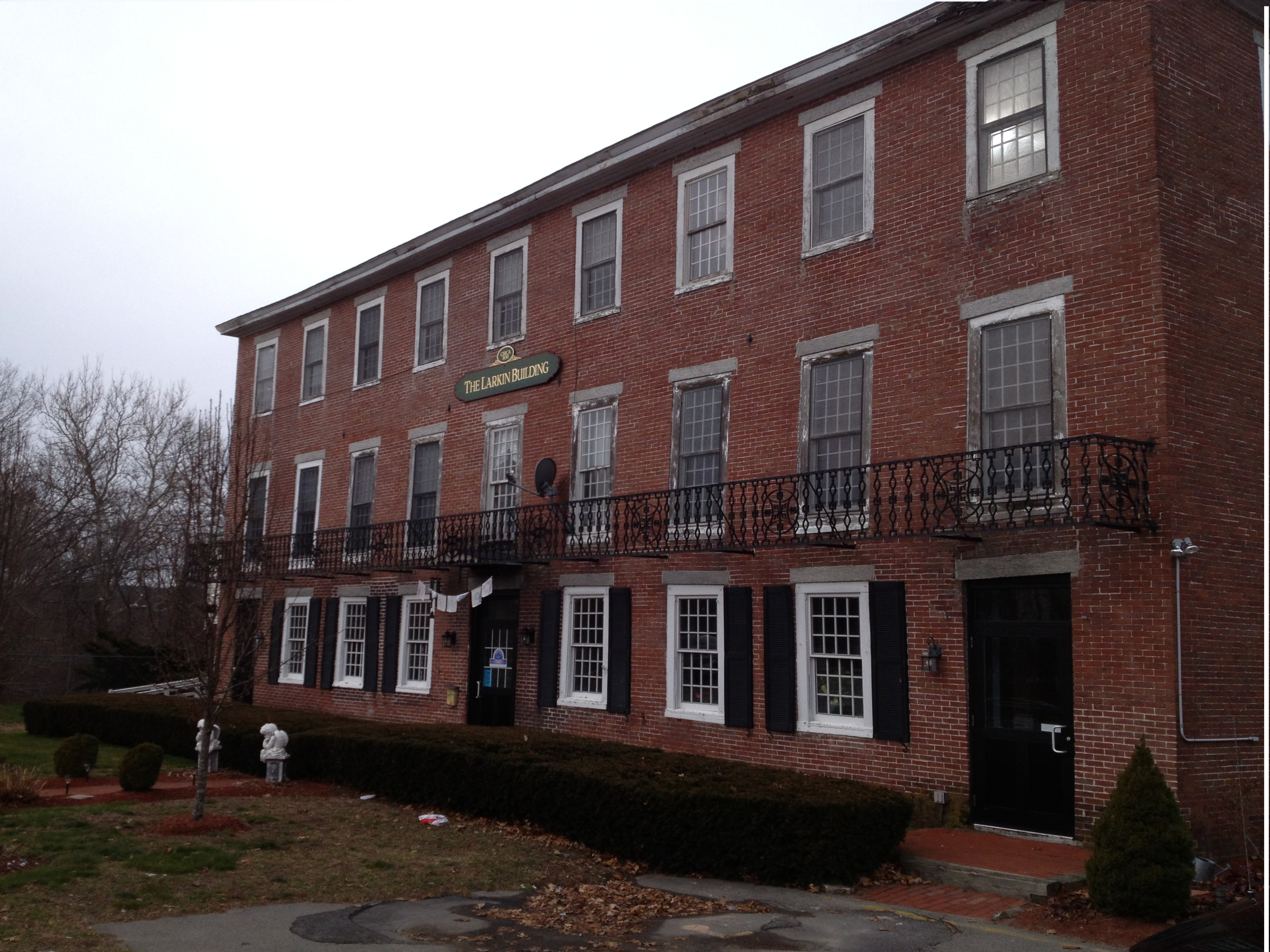
The Company Store, now known as the Larkin Building at Rogersons Village Historic District

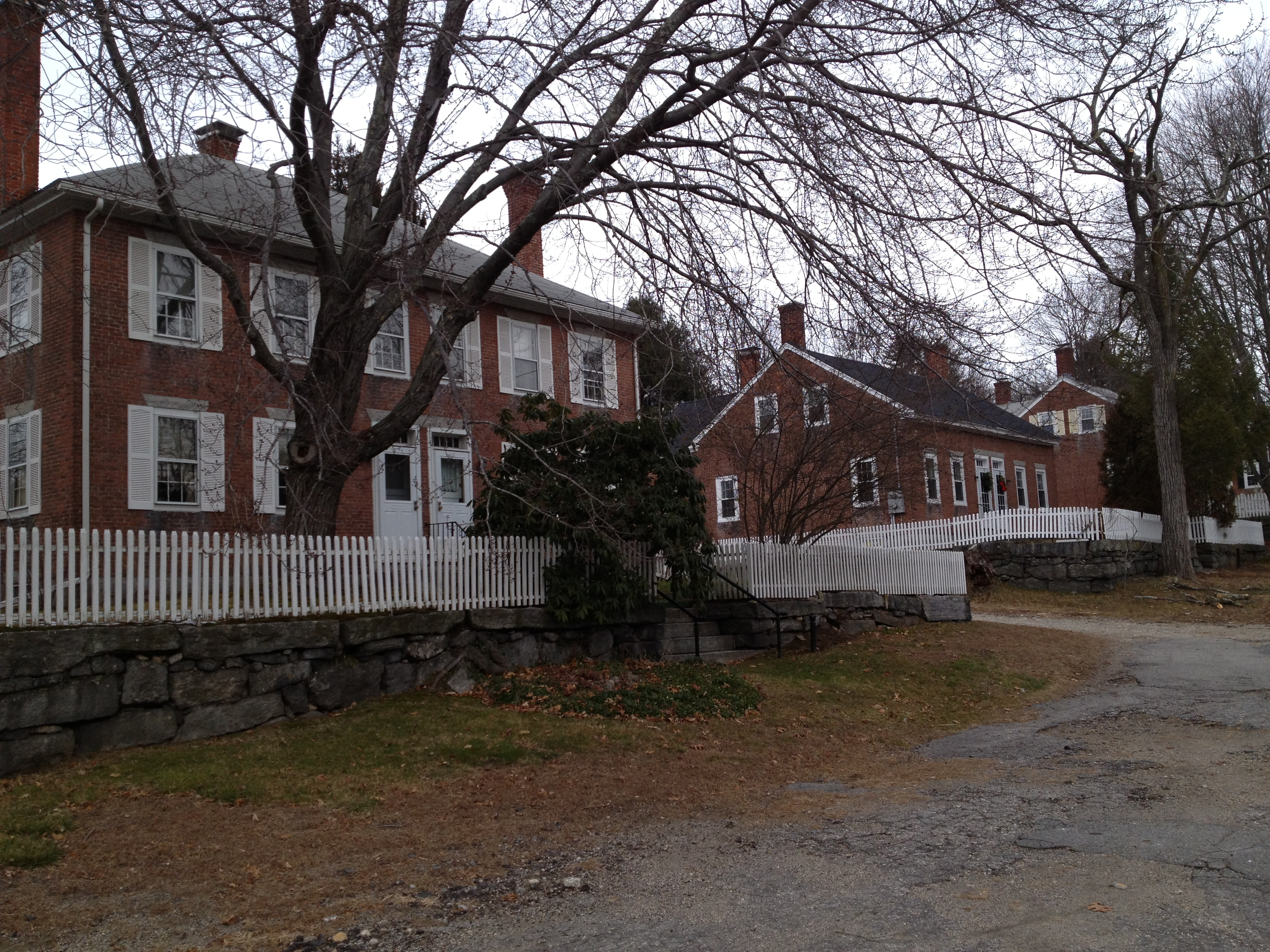
Rhode Island System of mill worker housing at Rogersons Village Historic District

Rogersons Village Mill worker housing circa 1824

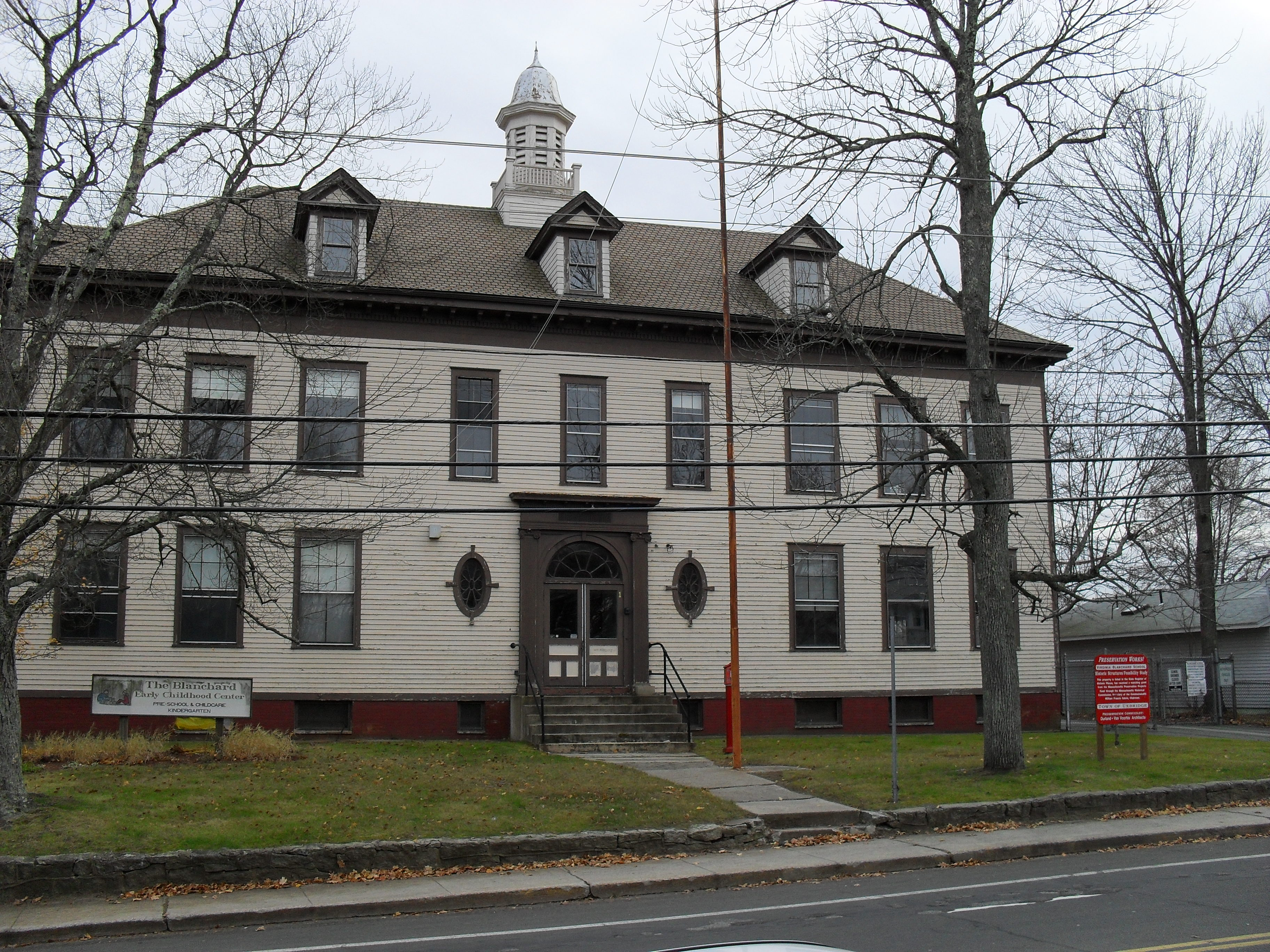
Historic North Uxbridge School

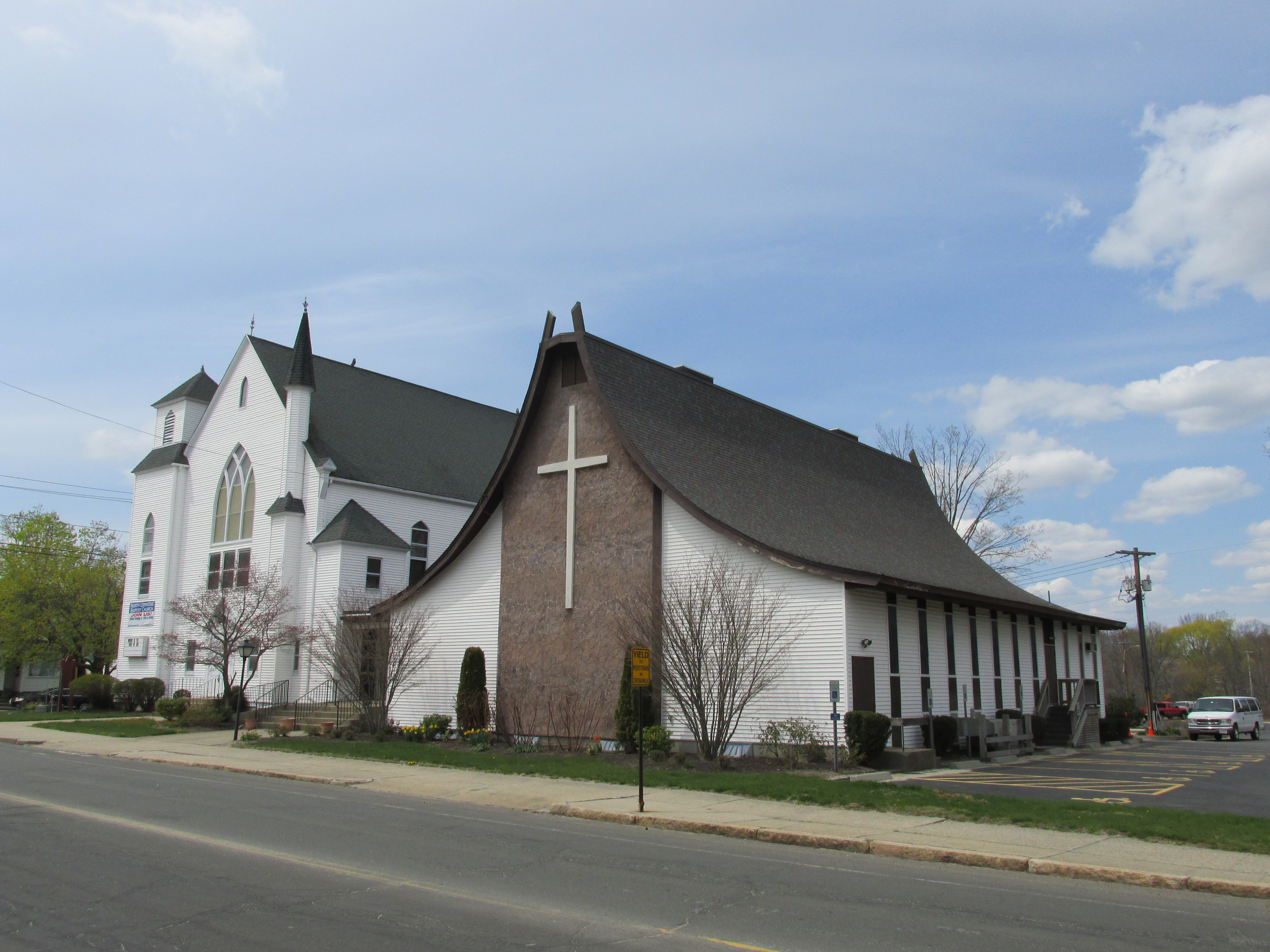
The Cornerstone Church (the former North Uxbridge Baptist Church)

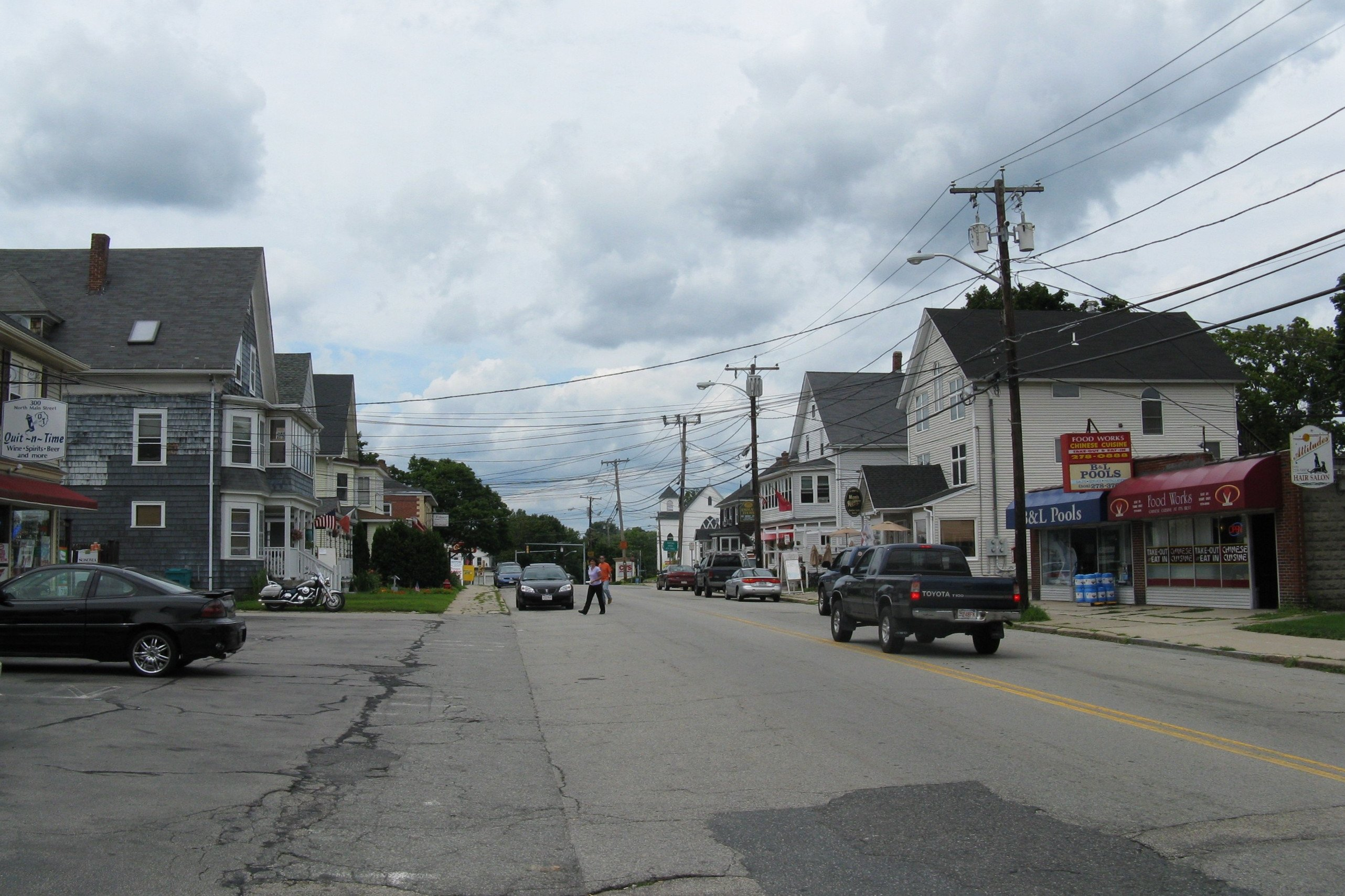
North Uxbridge Business District

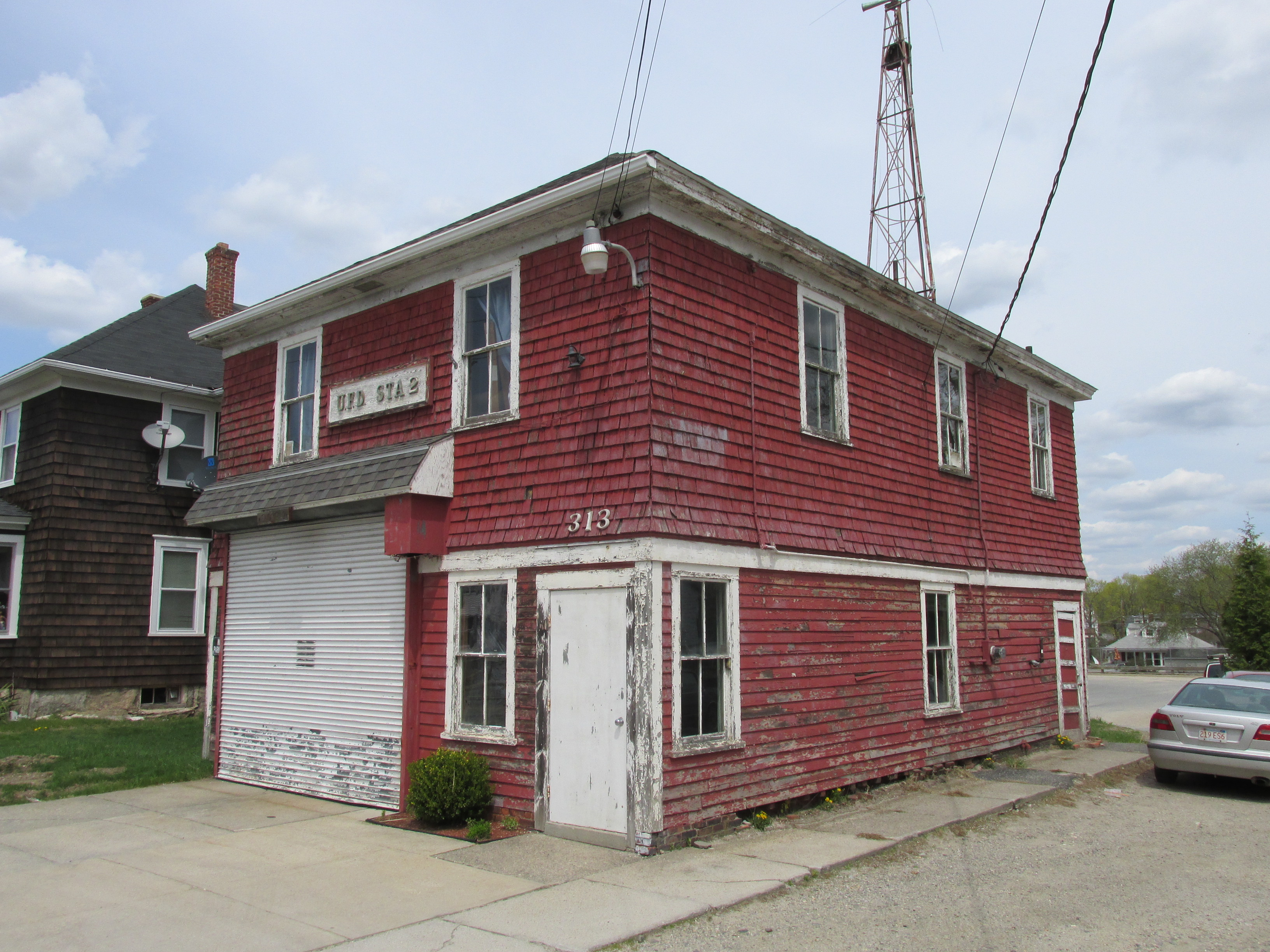
Former Station 2 of Uxbridge Fire Department at North Uxbridge. A replacement station was built near the former James Whitin Estate, at Rogerson's Village, a section of North Uxbridge

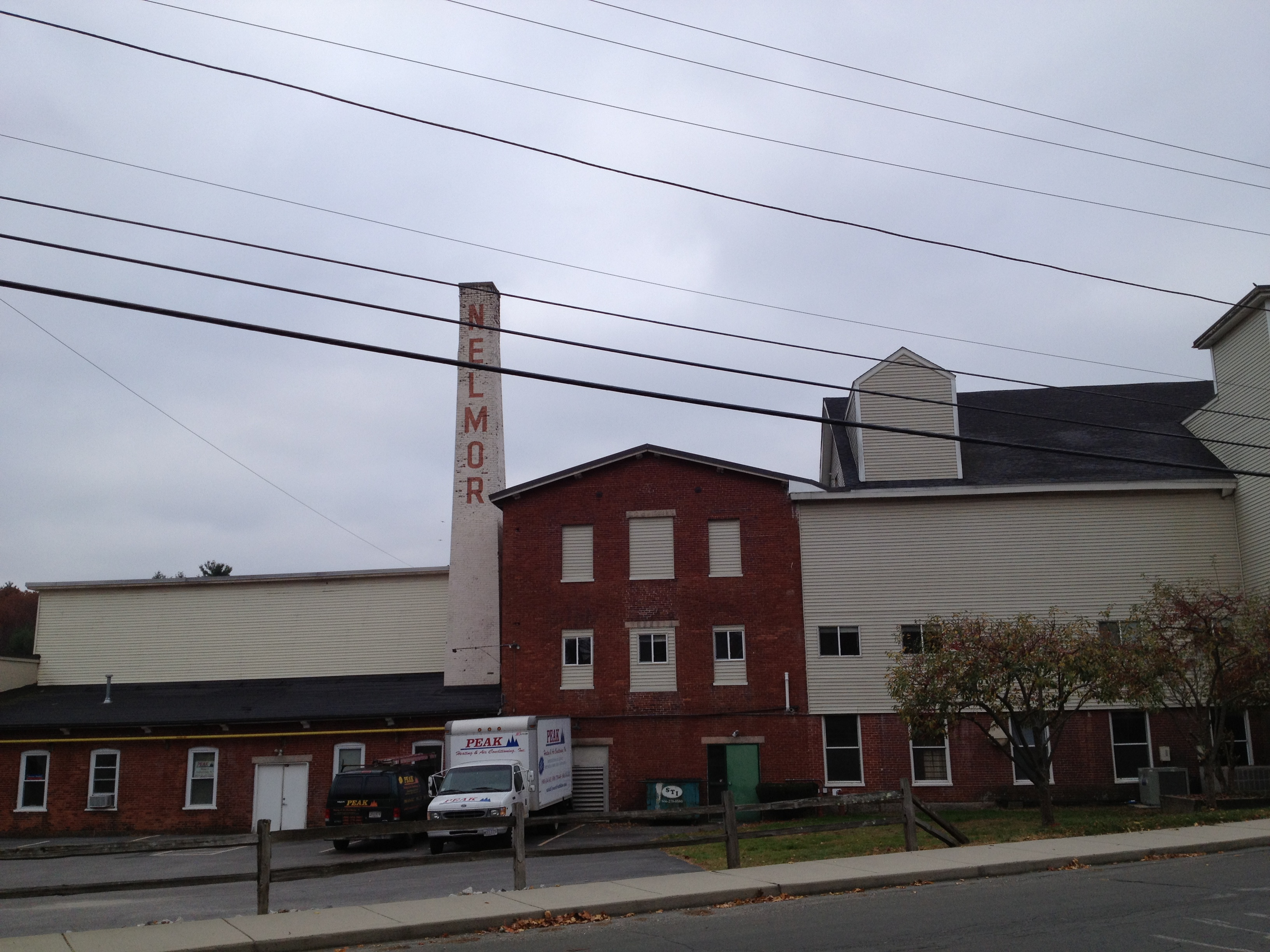
Rivulet Mill, 1814, North Uxbridge

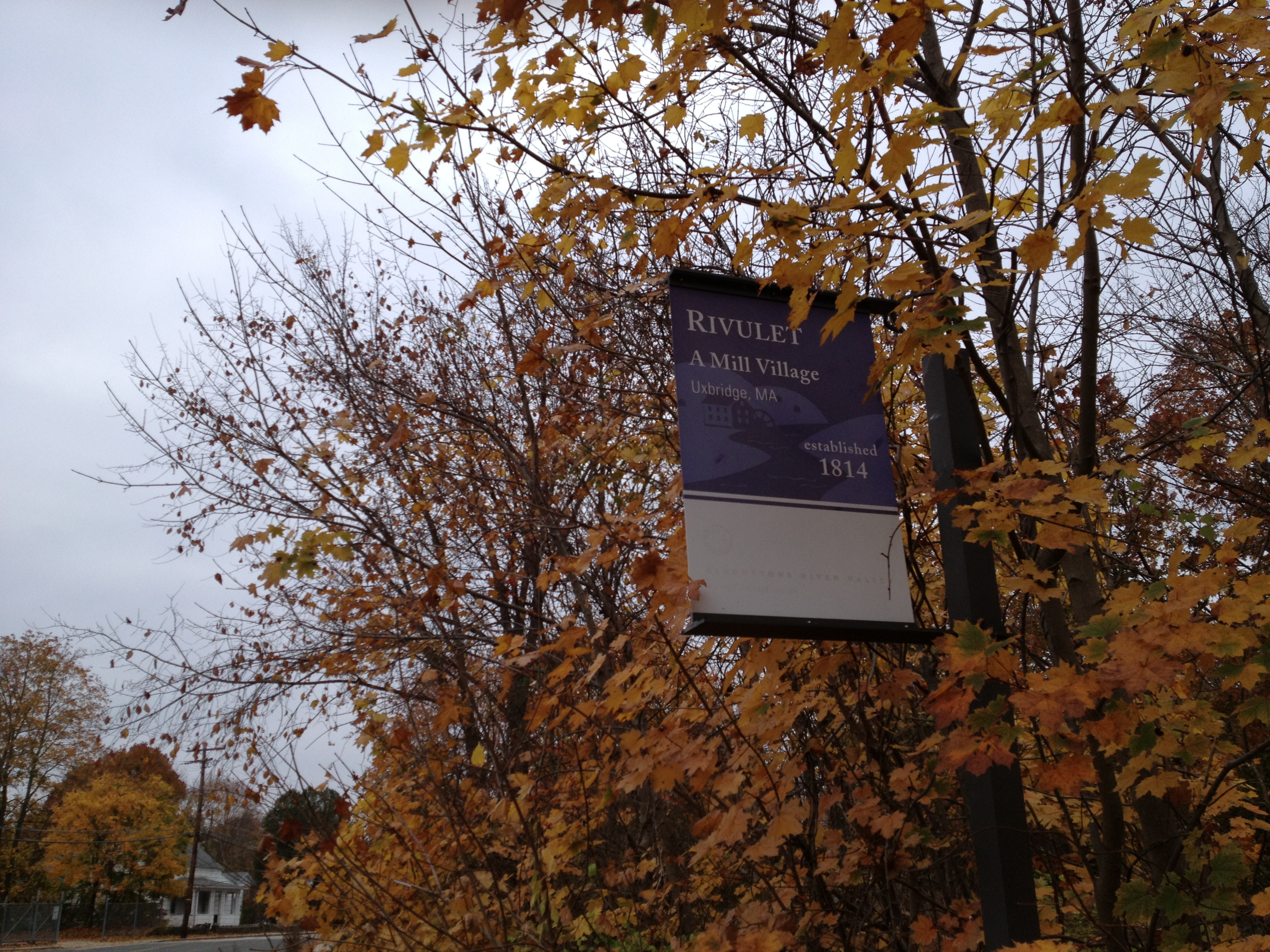
1814 historic marker of Rivulet Mill Village, North Uxbridge

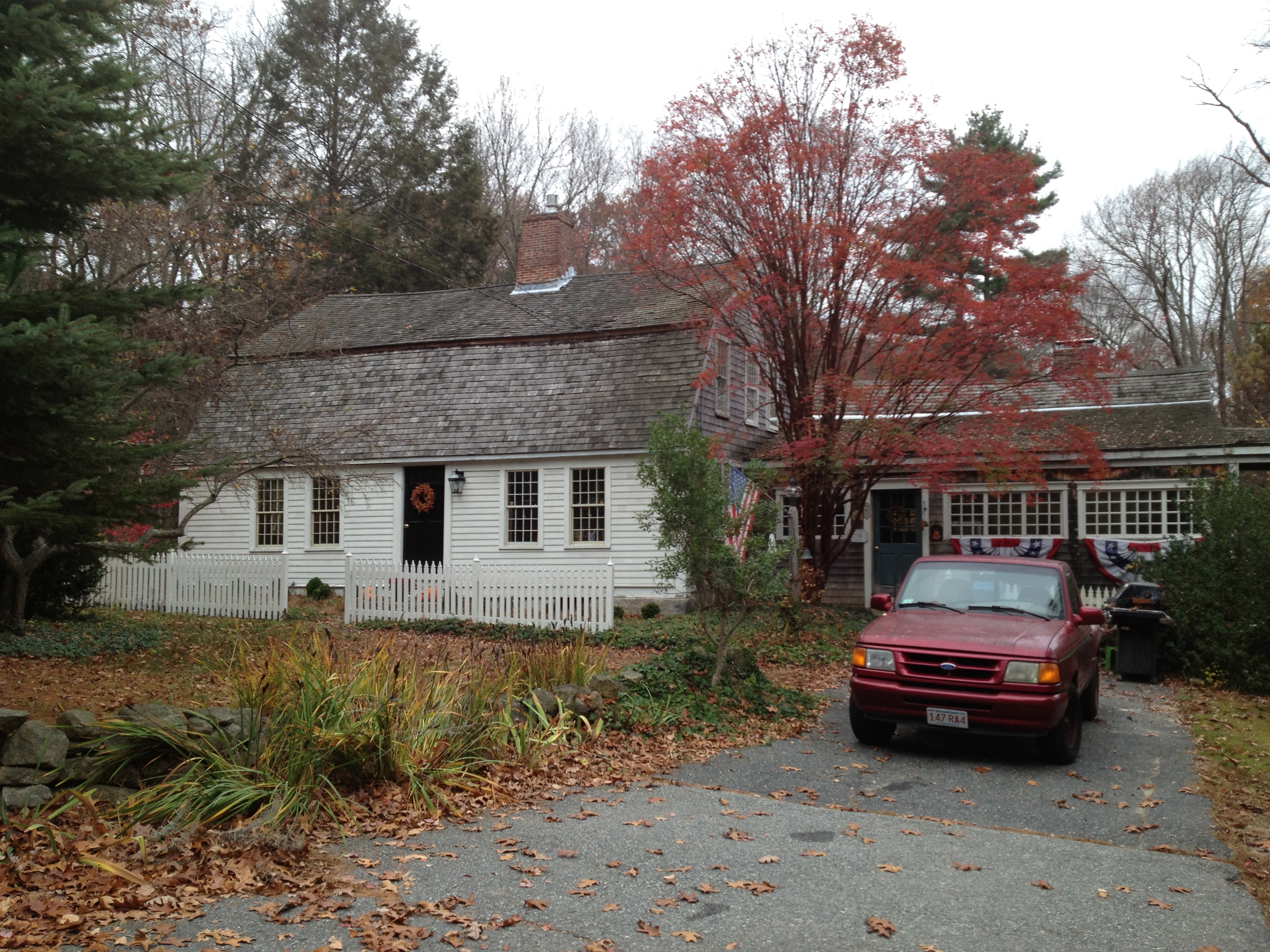
Samuel Taft House where newly elected President George Washington slept in 1789 giving Uxbridge a motto "President Washington really did sleep here". President William Howard Taft visited local sites of his ancestors, including the Samuel Taft house in 1910, and where his grandfather Peter Rawson Taft was born.

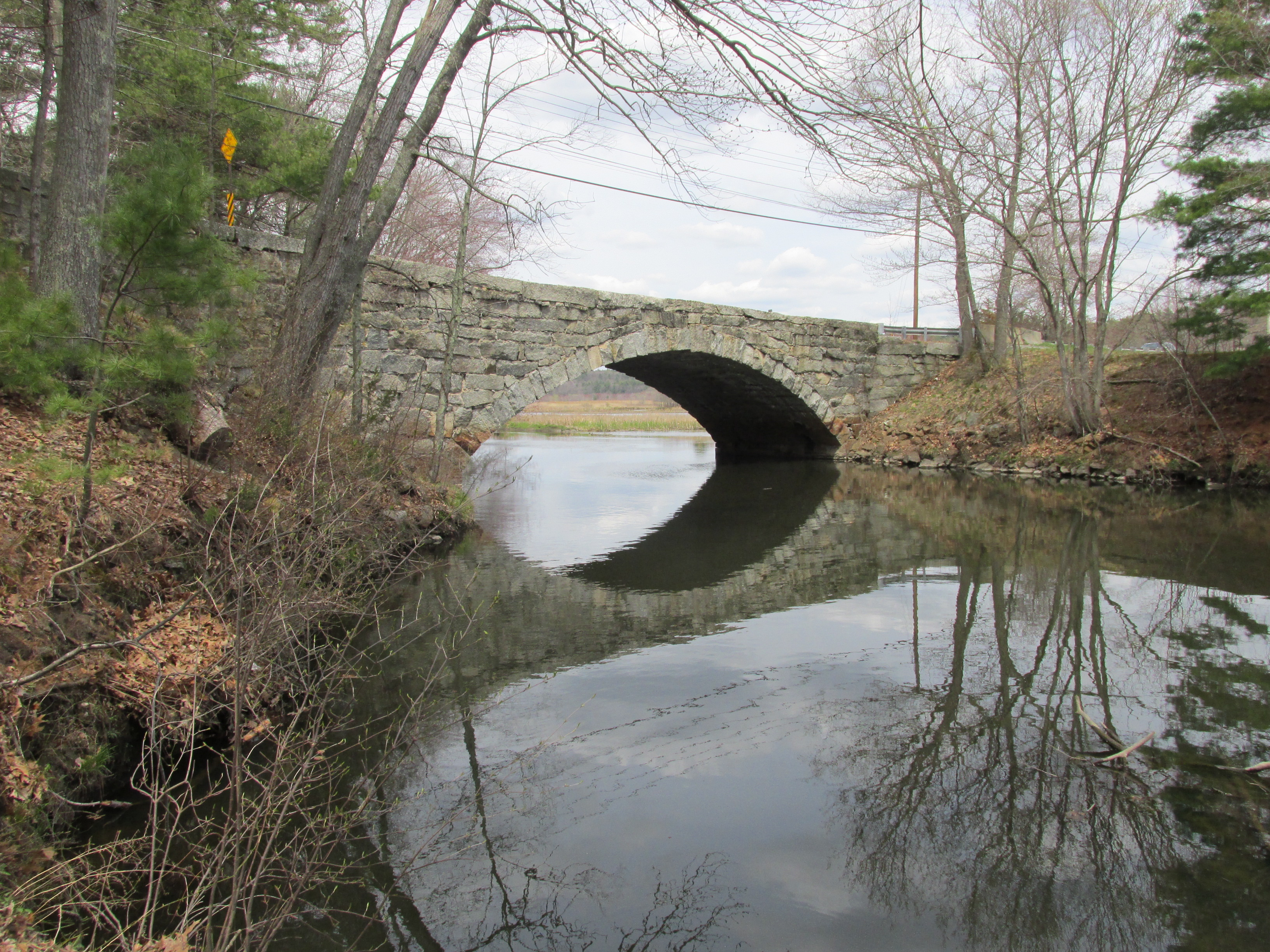
The Taft brothers built the first bridge across the Blackstone River in 1709. This stone arch bridge is a familiar scene in the North Uxbridge area off of East Hartford Ave, when walking along the Canal northward at the Blackstone River and Canal Heritage State Park.

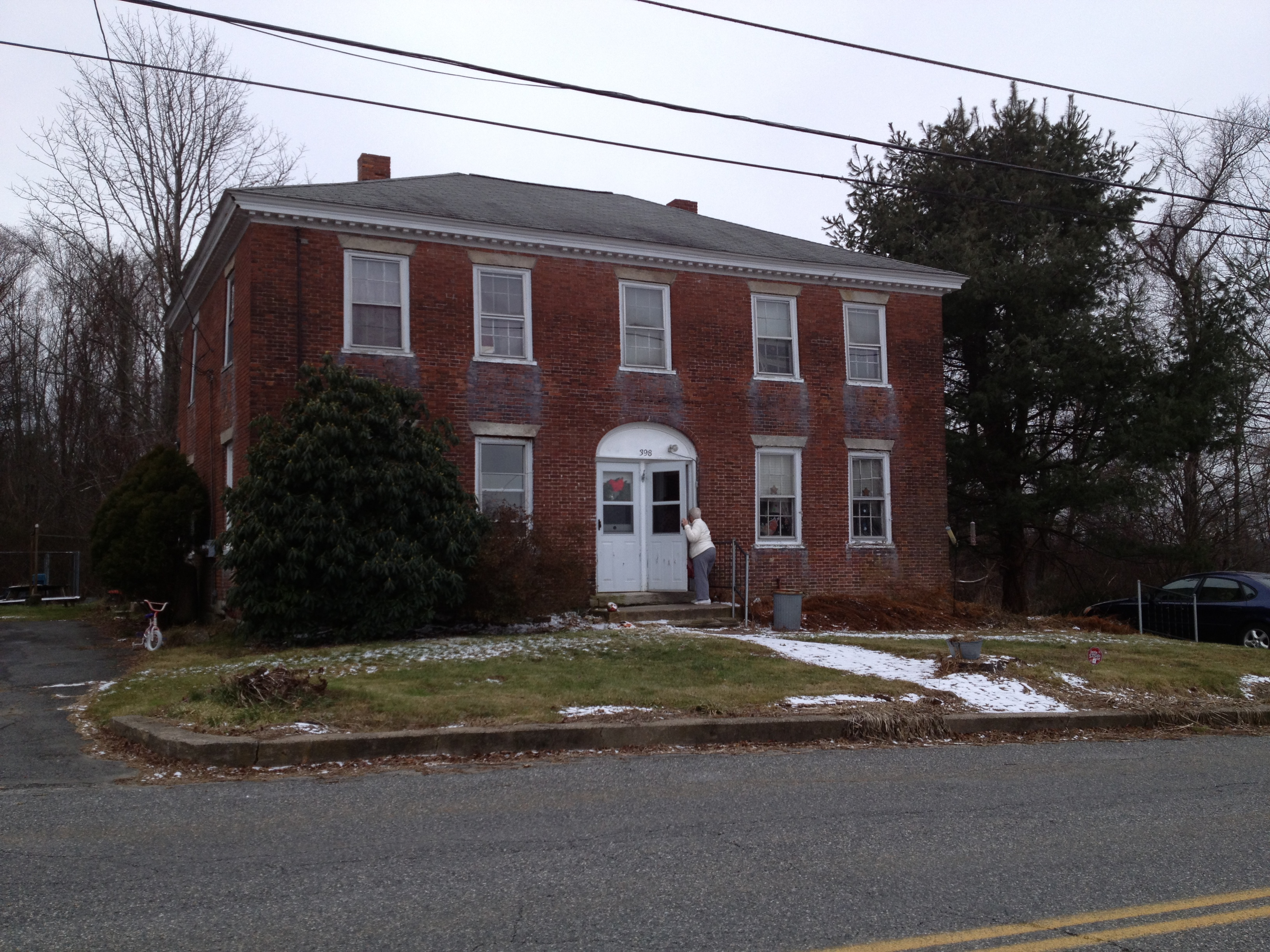
Historic A. Whipple House, Sutton Street. Built in 1810, Federal Architecture period

== See also ==
- List of mill towns in Massachusetts
- List of Registered Historic Places in Uxbridge, Massachusetts, Lists buildings relevant to this village
