= Wheelockville District =

Historic district in Massachusetts, United States

Coordinates: 42.081°N 71.613°W

- Wheelockville Historic District
- U.S. National Register of Historic Places
- U.S. Historic district
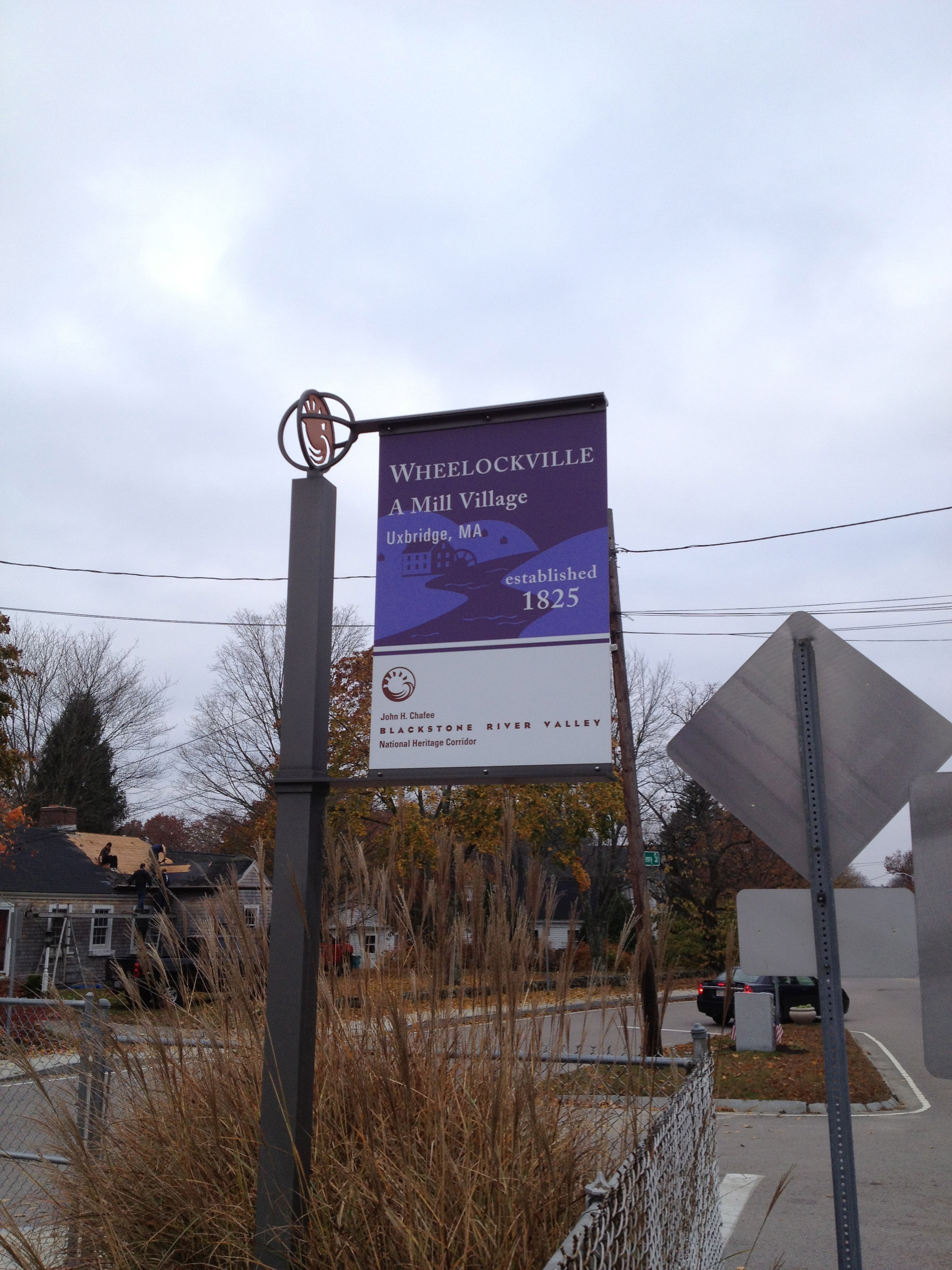
- Wheelockville, a mill village, Luke Taft's 1825 water-powered mill, West River

- Location within Massachusetts Location within the United States
- Location: Mendon and Henry streets, Uxbridge, Massachusetts
- Area: 10 acres (4.0 ha)
- Built: 1825
- Architectural style: Greek Revival, Federal
- MPS: Uxbridge MRA
- NRHP reference No.: 84002923
- Added to NRHP: January 20, 1984

The Wheelockville District is an historic district located at Mendon and Henry streets in the village of Wheelockville in Uxbridge, Massachusetts. It encompasses a collection of modest Federal and Greek Revival period worker housing, built primarily to house families of workers at the nearby Waucantuck Mill Complex. The oldest houses in the area were built c. 1825–35, and include cottages built by the mill owners. A second phase of growth between about 1860 and 1885 resulted in the construction of a number of buildings with vernacular Victorian elements, as well as the somewhat more ornate Italianate Wheelock House at 173 Mendon Street, which was built for a manager at another Uxbridge mill. The district runs roughly along Mendon Street (Massachusetts Route 16) from Hecla Street to the junction of Mendon and Henry Streets, and then along those two streets for about six houses.

The district was listed on the National Register of Historic Places in 1984.

== See also ==
- National Register of Historic Places listings in Uxbridge, Massachusetts
- List of mill towns in Massachusetts
