= Waucantuck Mill Complex =

- U.S. National Register of Historic Places
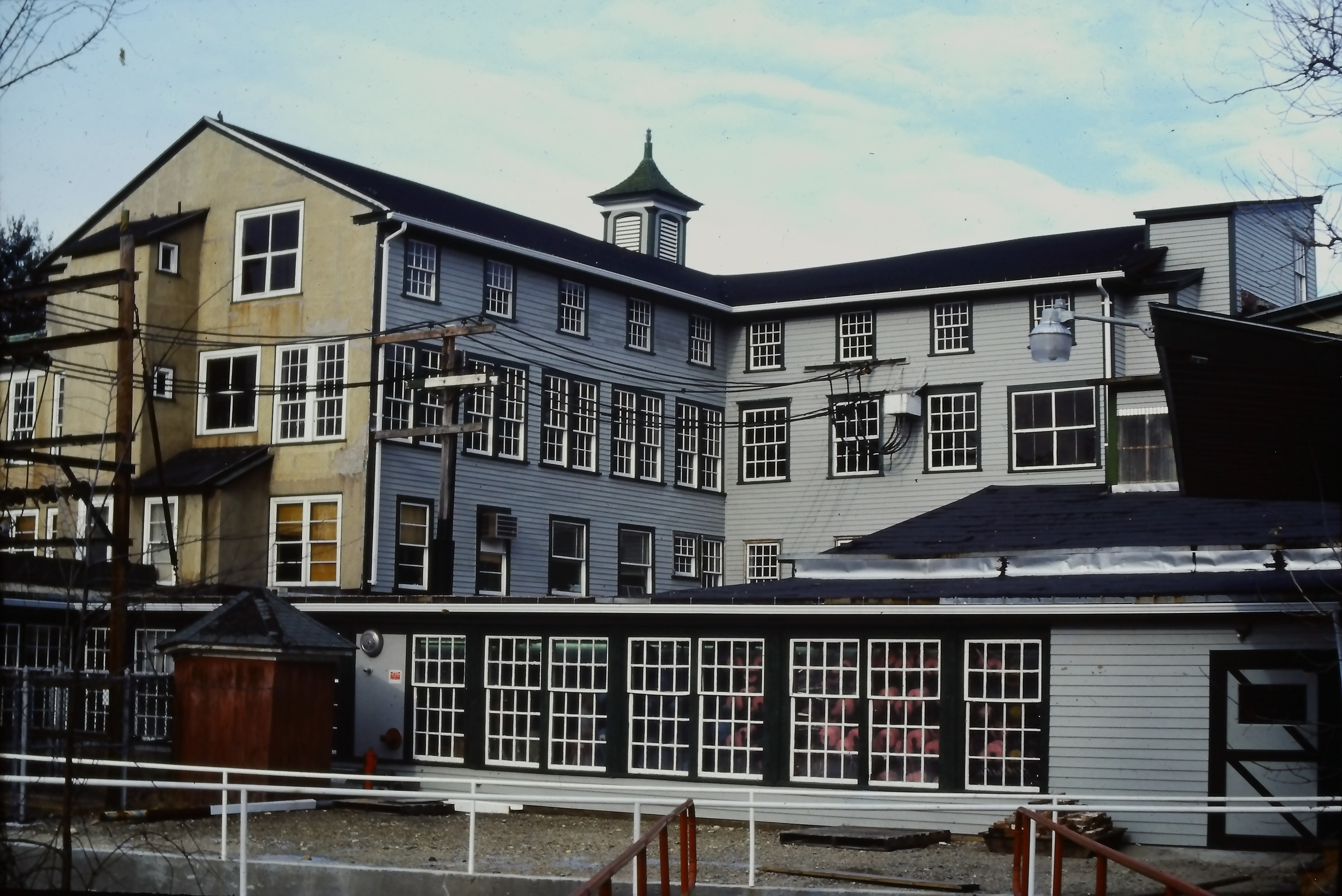
- rear of building of Waukantuck Mill Complex; It was razed due to EPA rules; historic photo
- Location: Mendon and Patrick Henry Sts., Uxbridge, Massachusetts
- Area: 6 acres (2.4 ha)
- Built: 1838
- MPS: Uxbridge MRA
- NRHP reference No.: 84002921
- Added to NRHP: January 20, 1984

The Waucantuck Mill Complex was a mill complex in Uxbridge, Massachusetts. Despite its 2010 demolition, (except for a historic storage building) it is still listed on the National Register of Historic Places.

== History ==
In the mid 20th century Waucuntuck mill was owned by John Brady and his family of Uxbridge. This Mill had various owners. Wash and Wear clothing was first developed at this site.

The original Luke Taft Mill, built in 1824, on the West River was very close to the present site of the Waucatuck Mill complex. Waucuntuck was the indigenous name of Uxbridge. The Waucantuck complex was planned for a condominium and retail complex, underway in 2009. Both are very close to and virtually part of the Wheelockville District, where the Stanley Woolen Mill was built in 1852. Wash and wear fabrics were first developed at this mill in the 20th century. Products were produced under the name of "Indian Head". In the 1960s the former holdings of American Woolen Company were eventually acquired by a company by that name in Uxbridge, MA. Originally the Uxbridge Worsted Company had proposed a buyout of American Woolen to become America's largest woolen conglomerate. The Town of Uxbridge was synonymous with the textile industry and its earliest and later developments.

The "Waucantuck Mill Complex" structure was razed in 2010 because of contaminated industrial wastes, and the main complex is gone, with the exception of one or more storage buildings, though the site remains. This remaining structure is site of original Luke Taft mill, Reference for historic photo A historic marker is planned. The site is the geographic center of the John H. Chaffee Blackstone River Valley National Historic Corridor, a region of national significance to the earliest industrialization of the United States. The Luke Taft Mill, and its successors were important footnotes in the early textile industry of the US. Innovations here included power looms, satinets, mixed textile blends, and wash and wear fabrics.

== See also ==
- National Register of Historic Places listings in Uxbridge, Massachusetts
