= Mumford River =

River in Massachusetts, United States

Mumford River's Capron Falls, which powered early Uxbridge mills

The Mumford River is an 18.3-mile-long (29.5 km) river in south-central Massachusetts. It is a tributary of the Blackstone River.

The river rises from its headwaters in Sutton and Douglas at Manchaug Pond and flows east in a meandering path through a series of ponds (Manchaug, Stevens, Gilboa, Lackey, Whitins, just west of Whitinsville), and joins the Blackstone River in Uxbridge.

The river was named for a hunter, named Mumford, at Mendon, who drowned in this river in the 17th century. This occurred before the towns through which this river flows were formed from Mendon. These towns include Douglas, Sutton, Northbridge, and Uxbridge. Mendon was first settled in 1660. This river was a source of water power for a number of mills and factories in America's earliest industrialization, in the historic Blackstone Valley. The Whitin Machine Works grew up at Whitinsville on the Mumford River, and was once the largest manufacturer of textile machines in the world. The Linwood Mill and the Crown and Eagle Mill at North Uxbridge also grew up on the Mumford, as did the historic Capron Mill at Uxbridge, and the Winfield Shuster Mill in East Douglas.

== See also ==
- List of rivers of Massachusetts
