= Northbridge, Massachusetts =

- Town
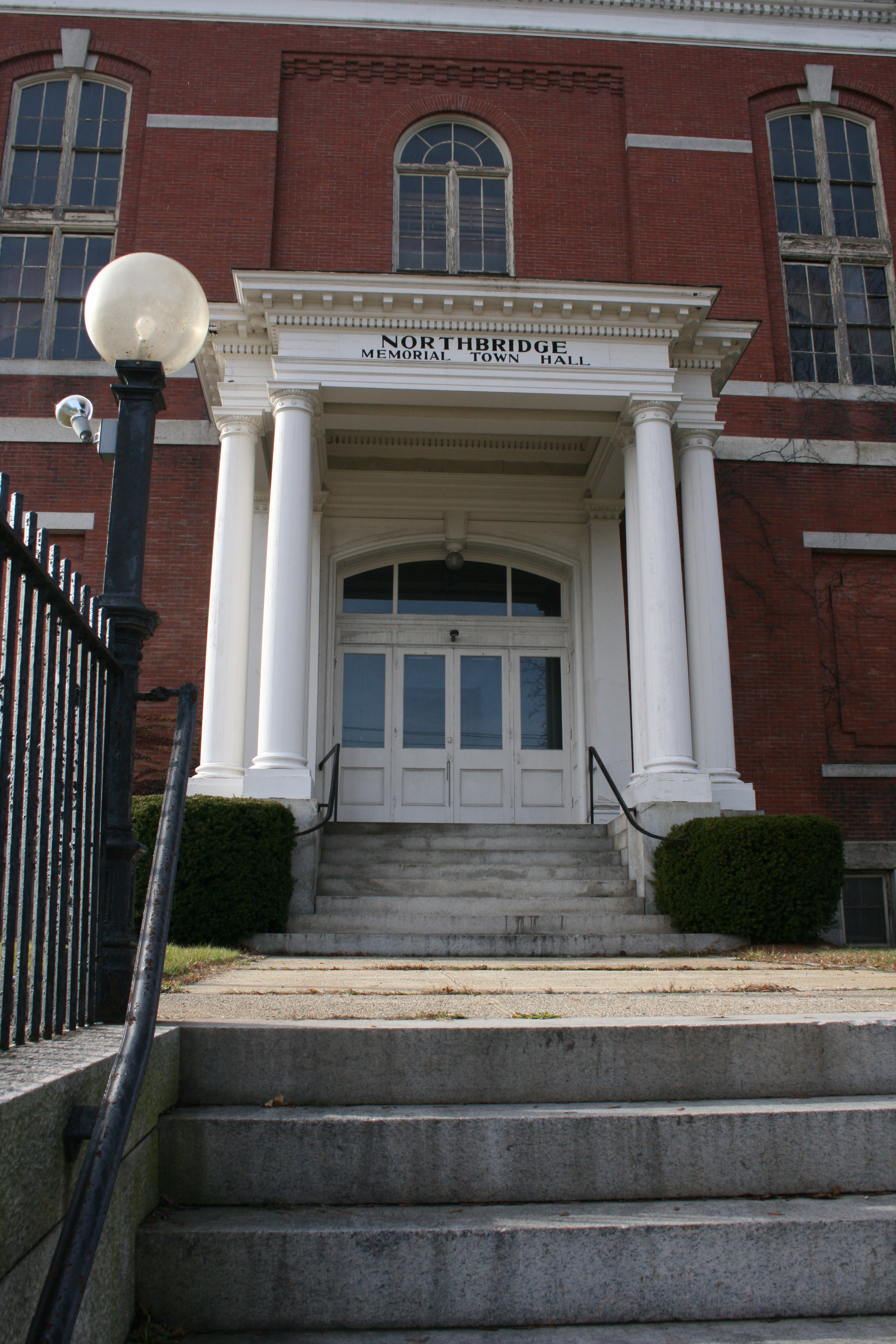
- Northbridge Town Hall

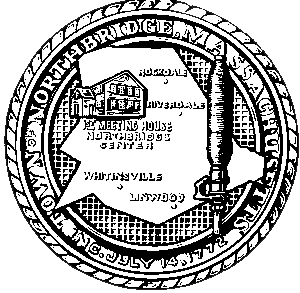
- Seal

- Location in Worcester County and the state of Massachusetts.
- Coordinates: 42°09′05″N 71°39′00″W
- Country: United States
- State: Massachusetts
- County: Worcester
- Settled: 1704
- Incorporated: 1772

Government
  - Type: Open town meeting

Area
  - Total: 18.1 sq mi (46.8 km^{2})
  - Land: 17.2 sq mi (44.5 km^{2})
  - Water: 0.89 sq mi (2.3 km^{2})
- Elevation: 299 ft (91 m)

Population (2020)
  - Total: 16,335
  - Density: 950/sq mi (367/km^{2})
- Time zone: UTC-5 (Eastern)
  - Summer (DST): UTC-4 (Eastern)
- ZIP codes: 01534 (Northbridge); 01588 (Whitinsville); 01525 (Linwood)
- Area code: 508 / 774
- FIPS code: 25-46925
- GNIS feature ID: 0618376
- Website: www.northbridgemass.org

Northbridge is a town in Worcester County, Massachusetts, United States. The population was 16,335 at the 2020 census. The Northbridge Town Hall is located at 7 Main Street in Whitinsville. The town is now a part of the Blackstone River Valley National Heritage Corridor, of the National Park Service. Northbridge claims to history include: Native American Nipmuc lands, Colonel John Spring, who led the Uxbridge militia training company in the American Revolution, Samuel Spring, Revolutionary War Chaplain, the Residence of Ezra T. Benson 1830–1832, the birthplace of President Millard Fillmore's mother, Phoebe, and home to the Whitin Machine Works from 1831 to 1964.

For geographic and demographic information on the village of Whitinsville, please see the article Whitinsville, Massachusetts.

== History ==
=== Early history ===
The earliest residents were the Nipmuc, or "Small Pond People". They had a well-developed agriculture, made tools, and had a graphite mine at Sturbridge. Northbridge was first settled by Europeans in 1704 and was officially incorporated on July 14, 1772. The town was once part of Mendon, from 1667 to 1726, and part of Uxbridge, from 1727 to 1772. Colonel John Spring, who had agitated for the new town of Northbridge, and later reversed his position, led a company of men in the Massachusetts Militia in the Revolution. Dozens of local men fought at the Lexington Alarm, and at Bunker Hill. Samuel Spring, John's son, became a Revolutionary War Chaplain commissioned in the militia at the Siege of Boston, and who also served in the Invasion of Canada (1775) under Colonel Benedict Arnold. Samuel carried Benedict Arnold and Aaron Burr, his Princeton classmate, off of separate battlefields. Colonel Seth Read and his brother, Colonel Joseph Read owned more than half of the land in this town at the time of the American Revolutionary War. They both fought in the Massachusetts Militia, and the Continental Army. The mother of President Millard Fillmore, Phoebe Millard (Fillmore), was born in Northbridge. Ezra Taft Benson Sr., a famous Mormon pioneer, lived here from 1830 to 1832 on his sister's farm. He married Pamela Andrus, of Northbridge, and also apparently her sister, Adeline Brooks Andrus. He then married six more times and served as a missionary to the Sandwich Islands, and in the Utah Territorial Legislature.

=== Manufacturing and Mill Villages ===
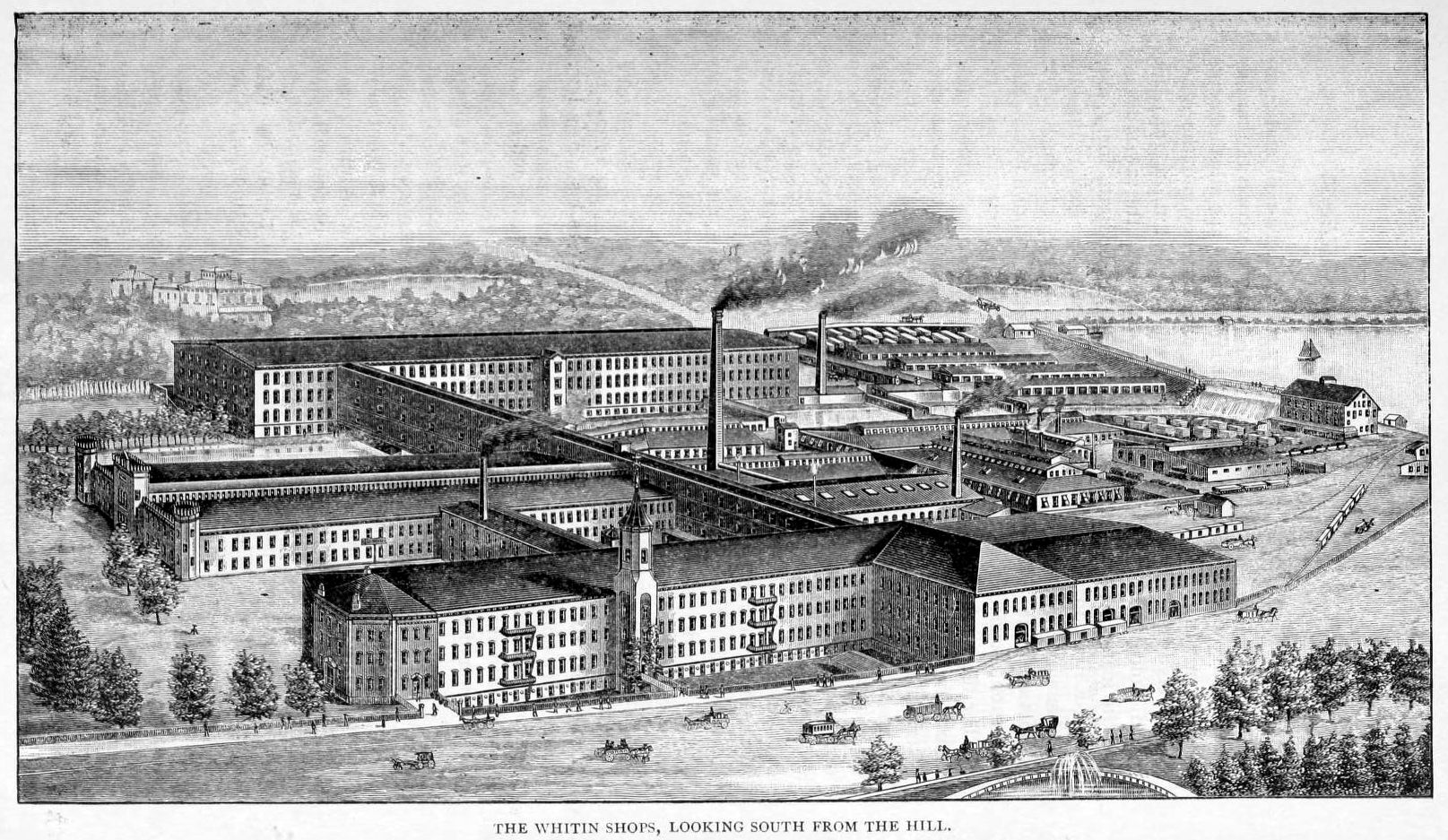
Whitin Machine Shop, 1897.

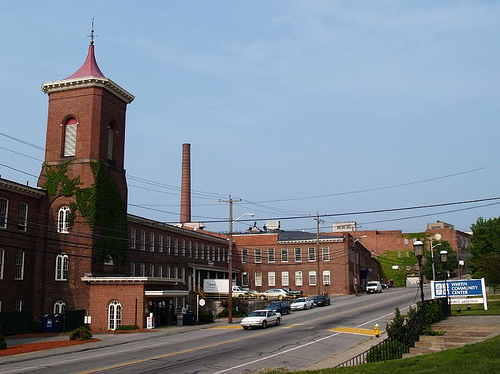
The former Whitin Machine Works, now known as the Whitinsville shop, located in the village of Whitinsville in the town of Northbridge.

This suburban community near Worcester has a rich manufacturing heritage. The Blackstone and Mumford Rivers run through the Town and in the early 19th century numerous industrial developments were erected along the riverbanks, most notably the Whitin Machine Shop in Whitinsville, at its peak the largest manufacturer of textile machines in the world. The textile machine company and industrial village was written up as one of the Harvard studies of history in business. Northbridge stands as a testament to the success of mill villages throughout the 19th and 20th centuries when production was expanding so greatly that immigrant labor from Canada, the Netherlands and Armenia was imported. Now, these mills stand, mostly renovated into housing and various businesses along the Blackstone River. Home of Lookout Rock, through which the bike trails pass and which overlooks the river below, the outskirts of the valley's community have a number of horse farms. Today most of the mill buildings are no longer used to full capacity, however, they do offer incubator space to small businesses. Further, most of the town's architecture developed during the 19th century has been preserved.

=== National Heritage Corridor ===
Northbridge is part of the Blackstone River Valley National Heritage Corridor Commission and is working with its neighboring communities to "promote the region's special character and sense of history". The Blackstone River Valley was the first industrialized region in the United States. Northbridge has a number of valley sites designated by the National Park service. The reservoir of the West Hill Dam flood control project and recreation area also lies within the town limits of Northbridge.

== Development ==
Several goals of the town are: "to strengthen the local economy through developing and reusing industrial areas as well as retaining existing businesses"; and, "to keep Northbridge as a desirable place to live through preserving and revitalizing the village centers, maintaining and expanding town services, and protecting natural resources".

In 2009, Northbridge was named a 'Bio-Ready' community by the Massachusetts Biotechnology Council. As of January 22, 2021, Northbridge maintains a Bronze BioReady rating.

== Geography ==
According to the United States Census Bureau, the town has a total area of 18.1 square miles (47 km^{2}), of which 17.2 square miles (45 km^{2}) is land and 0.9 square miles (2.3 km^{2}) (4.87%) is water.

=== Villages in Northbridge ===
- Whitinsville
- Linwood
- Rockdale
- Riverdale
- Northbridge Center
- Adams' Corners
- Plummer's Corner
- Prentice Corner
- Quaker District

=== Climate ===
Climate data for Northbridge, Massachusetts
| Month | Jan | Feb | Mar | Apr | May | Jun | Jul | Aug | Sep | Oct | Nov | Dec | Year |
|---|---|---|---|---|---|---|---|---|---|---|---|---|---|
| Record high °F (°C) | 68 (20) | 70 (21) | 87 (31) | 94 (34) | 97 (36) | 100 (38) | 102 (39) | 104 (40) | 96 (36) | 90 (32) | 82 (28) | 76 (24) | 104 (40) |
| Mean daily maximum °F (°C) | 37 (3) | 41 (5) | 48 (9) | 60 (16) | 70 (21) | 79 (26) | 84 (29) | 83 (28) | 75 (24) | 64 (18) | 53 (12) | 42 (6) | 61 (16) |
| Mean daily minimum °F (°C) | 15 (−9) | 18 (−8) | 25 (−4) | 35 (2) | 45 (7) | 55 (13) | 60 (16) | 59 (15) | 49 (9) | 38 (3) | 30 (−1) | 21 (−6) | 38 (3) |
| Record low °F (°C) | −25 (−32) | −20 (−29) | −13 (−25) | 11 (−12) | 25 (−4) | 31 (−1) | 38 (3) | 30 (−1) | 23 (−5) | 16 (−9) | −2 (−19) | −16 (−27) | −25 (−32) |
| Average precipitation inches (mm) | 3.89 (99) | 3.67 (93) | 4.59 (117) | 4.50 (114) | 3.90 (99) | 4.40 (112) | 3.81 (97) | 4.10 (104) | 3.96 (101) | 4.56 (116) | 4.54 (115) | 4.26 (108) | 50.18 (1,275) |

== Demographics ==
Historical population
| Year | Pop. | ±% |
|---|---|---|
| 1790 | 569 | — |
| 1800 | 544 | −4.4% |
| 1810 | 713 | +31.1% |
| 1820 | 905 | +26.9% |
| 1830 | 1,053 | +16.4% |
| 1840 | 1,449 | +37.6% |
| 1850 | 2,230 | +53.9% |
| 1860 | 2,633 | +18.1% |
| 1870 | 3,774 | +43.3% |
| 1880 | 4,053 | +7.4% |
| 1890 | 4,603 | +13.6% |
| 1900 | 7,036 | +52.9% |
| 1910 | 8,807 | +25.2% |
| 1920 | 10,174 | +15.5% |
| 1930 | 9,713 | −4.5% |
| 1940 | 10,242 | +5.4% |
| 1950 | 10,476 | +2.3% |
| 1960 | 10,800 | +3.1% |
| 1970 | 11,795 | +9.2% |
| 1980 | 12,246 | +3.8% |
| 1990 | 13,371 | +9.2% |
| 2000 | 13,220 | −1.1% |
| 2010 | 15,707 | +18.8% |
| 2020 | 16,335 | +4.0% |
| 2024* | 16,719 | +2.4% |
* = population estimate. Source: United States census records and Population Estimates Program data.

State government
| State Representative(s): | David Muradian (R) |
| State Senator(s): | Ryan Fattman (R) |
| Governor's Councilor(s): | Jen Caissie (R) |
Federal government
| U.S. Representative(s): | James P. McGovern (D-2nd District), |
| U.S. Senators: | Elizabeth Warren (D), Ed Markey (D) |

As of the census of 2010, there were 15,707 people, 5,896 households, and 4,097 families residing in the town. The population density was 913.2 inhabitants per square mile (352.6/km^{2}). There were 6,172 housing units at an average density of 341 per square mile (132/km^{2}). The racial makeup of the town was 96.0% White, 0.70% African American, 0.1% Native American, 1.0% Asian, 0.0% Pacific Islander, 0.7% from other races, and 1.5% from two or more races. Hispanic or Latino of any race were 3.1% of the population.

There were 5,896 households, out of which 34.1% had children under the age of 18 living with them, 53.8% were married couples living together, 11.1% had a female householder with no husband present, 4.6% had a male householder with no wife present, and 30.5% were non-families. 24.7% of all households were made up of individuals, and 9.6% had someone living alone who was 65 years of age or older. The average household size was 2.62 and the average family size was 3.1. In the town, the population was spread out, with 27.5% under the age of 18, 6.1% from 18 to 24, 31.3% from 25 to 44, 21.4% from 45 to 64, and 13.8% who were 65 years of age or older. The median age was 36 years. For every 100 females, there were 90.8 males. For every 100 females age 18 and over, there were 86.7 males.

The median income for a household in the town was $68,981, and the median income for a family was $87,359. Males had a median income of $57,076 versus $44,825 for females. The per capita income for the town was $30,945. About 4.6% of families and 4.8% of the population were below the poverty line, including 3.6% of those under age 18 and 5.8% of those age 65 or over.

== Transportation ==
Situated between Interstates 90 (Mass Pike), 146, 395, and 495, Northbridge has highway access to and from major cities such as Worcester, Providence and Boston. Route 146 has a small portion in the town. Also, Route 122 runs along Providence Road.

The nearest commuter rail station into Boston is located in nearby Grafton, approximately nine miles away. The town is located equidistantly (approx. 10–12 miles) between the Franklin/495/Forge Park T-station and the Worcester T-station, both with ample parking. A section of the Blackstone River Greenway, part of the East Coast Greenway is proposed to cross the town. If completed, the trail would connect the town to Worcester's downtown Union Station, as well as to Woonsocket, Providence, and Newport. From 2013 to 2026, the WRTA had weekday bus service to Grafton station, as well as to Millbury.

Historically, Northbridge had trolleys running through some of its village centers, and was on a commuter train line running from Worcester to Providence. The train runs as a freight line currently, however, discussion has begun in Rhode Island and Massachusetts about the possible redevelopment of a commuter line on this route

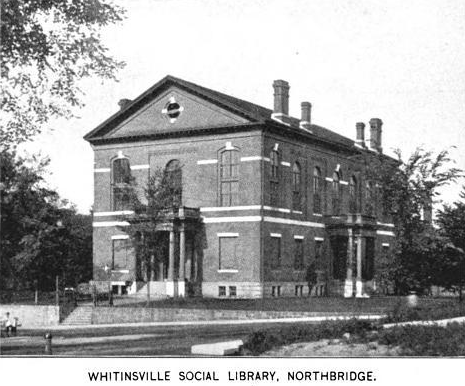
Whitinsville Social Library, Northbridge, 1899 – Now current town hall

== Education ==
Northbridge has both a public education system and a private education system. The public schools are operated by Northbridge Public Schools.

- Pre-K–5 is located at the Northbridge Elementary School located at 21 Crescent Street
- 6–7 is located at the Northbridge Middle School located at 171 Linwood Avenue
- 8–12 is located at the Northbridge High School located at 427 Linwood Avenue

Whitinsville Christian School is located at 279 Linwood Avenue in Whitinsville. The school houses Pre-K through 12th grade and is accredited by the New England Association of Schools and Colleges.

Blackstone Valley Regional Vocational Technical High School Is a technical high school located in Upton that provides school services for grades 9–12.

== Library ==
The public library in Northbridge began in 1844. In fiscal year 2011, the town of Northbridge spent 0.26% ($96,756) of its budget on its public library—approximately $6.16 per person, per year ($7.22 adjusted for inflation to 2021).

== Utilities ==
Local cable TV service is served by Charter Communication, Electricity is provided by National Grid and gas by Nstar/Commonwealth Gas Company.

== Notable people ==
- Glenn Adams (born 1947), Major League Baseball outfielder for three teams
- Ezra T. Benson (1811–1869), Mormon pioneer and Territorial Legislator; great-grandfather of twentieth-century Mormon leader Ezra Taft Benson
- George Chidi (born 1973), journalist, witness in the Georgia election racketeering prosecution of Donald Trump
- Lou Lucier (1918–2014), Major League Baseball player
- Steve Spagnuolo, former St. Louis Rams head coach
- Marcus Spring, New York City cotton merchant; founded Utopian community at Perth Amboy, New Jersey
- Samuel Spring, John's son, who served as a Revolutionary War chaplain
- Royal C Taft, born in Northbridge. Governor of Rhode Island.
- Phil Vandersea, Green Bay Packers player during the 1960s
- Col. Paul C Whitin 1767, textile machine founder, manufacturer
- Thomson M. Whitin (1923–2013), management scientist
- Steven Dorian (born 1977), musician

== See also ==
- List of mill towns in Massachusetts
