= List of people from Uxbridge, Massachusetts =

Uxbridge, Massachusetts, settled in 1662, has a record of people significant to both regional and U.S. history. The listing of people is by century, starting in the 17th century.

== 17th century ==
- The Taft family in America One of the first known European settlers in Uxbridge, was Robert Taft Sr., in 1680, in the western part of Mendon, Massachusetts, which later became known as Uxbridge. He established the famous Taft family, a later political dynasty in the United States. He established his first permanent homestead here in 1680. President William Howard Taft is a descendant. See the article, The Tafts of Mendon and Uxbridge. One reference in Alphonso Taft's biography may indicate that Robert settled near "Colonel Crown's" land which may be near East Hartford Avenue. Taft was best known for building a bridge with his sons over the Blackstone River in 1709. This is adjacent to, or could be, the famous "stone arch bridge" at the Blackstone River and Canal Heritage State Park. This road became known as the Middle Post Road.

== 18th century ==
- Captain James Buxton, 1745–1817, Smithfield, Providence County, Rhode Island Colony, was an American Revolutionary War Captain from the border of the towns of Smithfield in Rhode Island, and Uxbridge, Massachusetts. Buxton was a commissioned military officer who attained the rank of captain in the American War for Independence. He served in Benjamin Tupper's 11th Massachusetts Regiment, 1777–1779 at Valley Forge and the Battles of Saratoga. He also served in the 10th Massachusetts Regiment and the 15th Massachusetts Regiment. Buxton commanded a company of men at West Point, and the Hudson River Chain. He was promoted to the rank of captain on March 16, 1781, in the Continental Army, and the order was signed by John Hancock; He was discharged in 1782 and held the ranks of Ensign, Second Lieutenant, Lieutenant, and Captain during this period. He is listed as having signed an oath of allegiance at Valley Forge in 1778 in Colonel Tupper's regiment. John Hancock granted Buxton 300 acres in South Uxbridge for service in the American Revolution. Modern Uxbridge named a well-known Fife and Drum Corps in his honor.
- Robert Taft II was on the founding Board of Selectmen in 1727. It appears he was among the first of the Taft family dynasty to be elected to political office. His descendants included a Governor of Rhode Island, A U.S. Senator from Ohio, and a U.S. Secretary of Agriculture among others. The first Uxbridge town meeting was at Coronet John Farnum Jr. House in the center of town.
- Benjamin Taft established one of the first iron forges in Uxbridge in 1734, in the Ironstone section of town. The first Uxbridge forge was recorded even earlier, the year the town was founded in 1727, at the south Northbridge section. The Ironstone forge started by Taft had "good quality bog iron ore", and a triphammer was later added by Caleb Handy for making scythes and guns. This was believed to be the beginnings of industrialization in Uxbridge. The Blackstone Valley was a major contributor to America's Industrial Revolution with Slater Mill at Pawtucket, Rhode Island in 1793. Uxbridge had evidence of large-scale industrialization by 1775 which included forges, sawmills, water works, distilleries and other industries.
- Nicholas Baylies was a native of England who settled in Uxbridge. He represented this town in the Colonial Massachusetts General Court as early as 1758. He and his sons were active in working in Uxbridge's iron industry. His son William became a physician and is mentioned below. His grandsons served as U.S. Congressman from Dighton, Massachusetts, and Taunton, Massachusetts, where the family later relocated.
- Captain Josiah Taft son of Daniel Taft, grandson of Robert Taft Sr., served in the French and Indian Wars and in the Colonial Legislature, the Massachusetts General Court, was town moderator, and died in 1756 at the age of 47. Lydia and Josiah were among the wealthiest families in Uxbridge. Josiah's untimely death opened the door for his widow to become America's first legal, colonial woman voter in 1756.
- Lydia Chapin Taft Josiah's widow, became America's first woman voter, in 1756. She voted to support funding and resources for the French and Indian Wars, and voted in at least three Uxbridge town meetings until at least 1765. She died at Uxbridge, as an American citizen, after Colonial America had become the United States in 1778.
- Baxter Hall was a drummer in the Fife and Drum Corps in 1775. He served at Lexington and Concord, and Bunker Hill, under Captain Wyman, and in the Continental Army during the American Revolutionary War. The majority of the company of 51 men were from Uxbridge. Many officers and soldiers from Uxbridge fought in the war. Later, Captain Baxter Hall served in the Continental Army under General Benedict Arnold.
- Seth Reed was born in Uxbridge in 1746. He became a physician, soldier, legislator and an early American pioneer to the Great Lakes. According to the United States Treasury, Colonel Reed, also spelled "Read", of Uxbridge (who commanded a regiment at Bunker Hill and was a friend of President George Washington), was reported to have been instrumental in placing E Pluribus Unum on U.S. coins. Colonel Reed and his brother Joseph had been major holders of Uxbridge and Northbridge, Massachusetts real estate. Colonel Reed ran a tavern, served in various town offices, and was appointed to serve Uxbridge in 1777, by being in charge of dealing with "traitors" treason and sedition. He went on to serve in the Constitutional Convention, the Massachusetts state legislature and applied for a franchise to mint coins ("Massachusetts coppers"). He later moved, became a pioneer in Geneva, New York, and then he and his family were the first European settlers of Erie, Pennsylvania. The phrase "E Pluribus Unum", "From Many, One" is considered "the traditional motto" of the United States. "In God We Trust" was then added in 1956.
- Colonel Joseph Read Colonel Read's brother, Colonel Joseph Read, was also a Colonel in the Continental Army, and commanded the 20th Massachusetts Regiment.
- "Robert Shurtlieff" a Continental Army soldier, claimed to be from Uxbridge, but was really Deborah Sampson, "America's first woman soldier".
- Samuel Spring born 1746, was a Revolutionary War Chaplain sho served in the Siege of Boston, and the Invasion of Canada (1775), who later founded the Massachusetts Missionary Society and the Andover Theological Seminary. Spring has many published sermons and works. He was considered a Congregationalist fundamentalist. He had trained under the Reverend Nathan Webb, also mentioned below as the first pastor at Uxbridge's Congregational church, the colony's first Congregational church, which was started during the Great Awakening period of Jonathan Edwards.
- Samuel Taft was a revolutionary war soldier. There were at least 12 Tafts from Uxbridge who served in the Revolutionary War. In 1789, Samuel Taft would entertain his commander in chief, President George Washington, during his inaugural trip through Uxbridge, and his overnight stay at the Samuel Taft tavern.
- Dr. Samuel Willard was one of the town's first physicians. Uxbridge Center was home to the "lunatic asylum" run by Willard, who fought in Shays' Rebellion. Shays' Rebellion may have had its "opening salvos" in an Uxbridge riot in 1783. Governor John Hancock had to suppress rioters in Uxbridge. Willard had his own eccentricities. Willard, a Harvard University graduate, was "particularly distinguished" for his treatment of mental health disorders, according to the archives of Worcester County's university graduates. Local history indicates that his treatments consisted of "Dunking in the mineral spring pond behind the old inn" which was deemed to be an 'effective treatment for insanity', as was working on the good doctor's farm. This pond (Shuttle Shop Pond) was a favorite ice skating spot for children for years until it was filled in by the town after the shop burned down in 1963. The Hotel Wilson (now known as the Uxbridge Inn) welcomed travelers to the town who came to enjoy the same healing waters that "treated" Willard's patients. Willard represented Uxbridge in the Massachusetts Constitutional Convention which ratified the U.S. Constitution. He reportedly held slavers, prior to 1783. Massachusetts was the first state to abolish slavery, also in 1783.
- Lieutenant Simeon Wheelock fought in the American Revolutionary War. He was an officer in Shays' Rebellion. He was killed in the line of duty in Springfield during Shays' Rebellion. His son Jerry was famous in the early textile industry of Uxbridge. The Stanley Woolen Mill and Berroco Yarns are related to this same family.
- Peter Rawson Taft I President William Howard Taft's grandfather, was born in Uxbridge in 1785, and lived here until the beginning of the 19th century. He became a Vermont State legislator and died in Hamilton County, Ohio. A Taft family story is told how Peter walked a cow all the way from Uxbridge to Townshend, Vermont. His son, Alphonso Taft, founded Skull and Bones at Yale University, and was the father of President William Howard Taft. Alphonso and his son William Howard came to Uxbridge for family reunions at Elmshade.
- Richard Mowry was an Uxbridge farmer who successfully built and marketed the equipment needed to manufacture woolen, linen or cotton cloth at the time of the American Revolution. Mowry built wagons and apple presses in addition to the textile equipment. He was particularly proficient with large wooden screws.
- Nathan Webb an early American Congregational Church minister, was born on April 9, 1705, at Braintree, Norfolk County, Massachusetts; he died on March 17, 1772, at Uxbridge. Webb was the first called minister of the new Congregational Church in the newly incorporated (1727) Town of Uxbridge. He was called on January 6, 1731. This church was the first new Congregational Church in Massachusetts in the Great Awakening period, and first to be mentioned in a list of 45 new Congregational churches in New England which were started in the decade beginning in 1731. The churches of this period were attributed to the Great Awakening, an early American historical religious movement led by ministers such as Jonathan Edwards, another Congregational minister. Reverend Webb spent his entire career in the ministry at Uxbridge, spanning over 41 years. His congregation included America's first woman voter, Lydia Taft, and Lt. Col. Seth Read, who fought at Bunker Hill, was instrumental in adding E Pluribus Unum to US coins, and founded Erie, Pennsylvania. Many members of the early American Taft family were members of Webb's congregation. Peter Rawson Taft's son, Alfonso, started the Ohio family branch which rose to prominence in American politics. Nehemiah Hall and his wife, Sarah (Hayward) had nine children. Their son Baxter Hall drummed the first musters in the American Revolution. Another son, Nehemiah Hall Jr., married Hannah White, a Taft family descendant. The entire Hall family were members of Webb's congregation. Webb mentored young Samuel Spring who became a Revolutionary War Chaplain, founded the Andover Theological Seminary, and the Massachusetts Missionary Society. A sermon delivered at Uxbridge, April 19, 1772, occasioned by the death of the late Reverend Nathan Webb, Pastor of said church and people: containing a summary of his character. : And now published, at the desire of many of the hearers, to revive and perpetuate the memory of their said pastor. exactly three years before the battle of Lexington and Concord. Reverend Webb's wife was Ruth (Adams), President John Adams' aunt, born March 21, 1700, Braintree, Massachusetts, and died August 26, 1761, Uxbridge. They were married on November 23, 1731, in Uxbridge.

== 19th century ==
- Nicholas Baylies was born and raised in Uxbridge, and served as a Justice of the Vermont Supreme Court.
- Edward P. Bullard was born in Uxbridge and invented the first vertical boring machine. His son continued the business which invented the turret lathe. This tool making design of the Bullard Machine Tool Company allowed later innovations that enabled the American Automotive industry.
- Effingham Capron was a prominent industrialist and son of John Capron who established the first power looms for woolens in the US. He worked with his father and brother John C. in the Capron Mills. He became an ardent anti-slavery advocate, and "liberator" on the Underground Railroad, and rose to national prominence in the period before the Civil War. He, Abby Kelly and others led to Uxbridge becoming an important junction on the Underground Railroad. In 2012, the Capron Park in downtown Uxbridge, was dedicated to his honor, as a state park.
- Rev. Willard Preston, D.D. (1785–1856) was an eloquent clergyman and Uxbridge native who went on to be President of the University of Vermont, and a famous minister with published sermons at Savannah, Georgia, just prior to the Civil War. He pastored the Independent Presbyterian Church at Savannah, and was said to have been influenced by the Second Great Awakening, A religious movement that helped to produce social changes such as Abolition of slavery, women's rights, and prison reforms.
- Early U.S. Congressmen; Two U.S. Congressmen. were elected from Uxbridge Center to serve the new nation in the early 19th century, Benjamin Adams (1815–1823) and Phineas Bruce (1803–1805). Phineas Bruce was unable to serve out his term due to illness and died in Uxbridge in 1809. These two Congressmen are buried in the Prospect Hill Cemetery along with a Medal of Honor recipient.
- Bezaleel Taft Sr. and Bezaleel Taft Jr. were descendants of Lydia and Josiah Taft. They both served in the Massachusetts General Court, the legislature, the Massachusetts Senate, and on various state education and executive boards and commissions. Five generations of Tafts in Massachusetts were prominent in public service from Uxbridge. The "Life of Alphonso Taft", from Google books is a particularly rich source of the history of the Taft family in Mendon and Uxbridge.
- Luke Taft, Moses Taft, Jerry Wheelock, John Capron, Effingham Capron and Colonel John Capron, were well known early industrialists of 19th-century Uxbridge. The mills of Uxbridge pioneered power looms, manufactured U.S. military uniforms for more than a century, developed wash and wear fabrics, vertical integration to clothing, satinets, and pioneered blended fabrics including wool-nylon serge.
- Daniel Day established the oldest woolen mill in this town, one of the oldest in the U.S., in 1809.
- Robert Rogerson was born to parents from England, and brought grand plans for his cotton mills to Uxbridge. He left as a legacy the aesthetic mill village known as the Crown and Eagle Mills in Uxbridge which is considered a "masterpiece of early industrial architecture".
- Ezra Taft Benson Sr. born 1811 in Mendon, lived in Uxbridge from 1817 to 1835, ran the local hotel, and married Pamela Andrus of Northbridge. He became an entrepreneur of a cotton mill in Holland, Massachusetts. He later became a famous Mormon missionary at Quincy, Illinois. He entered plural marriages, including Pamela's sister, served as an apostle to "the Sandwich Islands", also known as Hawaii, and the Eastern States, and as a representative to the Utah Territorial Legislature. He later died at Ogden, Utah.
- Arthur MacArthur Sr. born in Glasgow, Scotland, lived here as a boy, and later served as a Wisconsin acting Governor and Supreme Court of Wisconsin chief justice and Supreme Court Chief Justice in the Washington, D.C. circuit. His son and grandson were both famous. His grandson was General Douglas MacArthur.
- Edward P. Bullard was born and grew up here. He invented the vertical boring mill.
- William Augustus Mowry noted educator and prolific historical writer, was born and grew up in Uxbridge. Among other works he wrote about the "History of the Territorial Expansion of the United States", (1902). Other works included: Who Invented the American Steamboat? (1874), Political Education in the Schools (1878), The School Curriculum and Business Life (1881), Talks with my Boys (1884; fifth edition, 1909), Elements of Civil Government (1890; new edition, 1913), War Stories (1892), Art Decorations for School Rooms (1892), Sunshine upon the Psalms (1892), Lov'st Thou Me More than These? (1892), A History of the United States (1896), The Uxbridge Academy, a Brief History with a Biographical Sketch of Joshua Mason Macomber, A.M., M.D., Preceptor (1897), First Steps in the History of our Country (1898; revised edition, 1914), with A. May, American Inventions and Inventors (1900), Marcus Whitman and Early Oregon (1901), American Heroes (1903), with Blanche S. Mowry, American Pioneers (1905), Essentials of United States History (1906; revised edition, 1914), Recollections of a New England Educator (1908). Mowry was listed in Who's Who in America.
- "Sarah" Arnold the widow of Benedict Arnold and a native of Philadelphia, died here on February 14, 1836. This appears to be verified in the town vital records. among others. Some sources claim that Margaret Shippen died in England on August 24, 1804, at the age of 41. She may have returned incognito to Massachusetts before her death.
- Corporal Edward Sullivan (US Marine) of Uxbridge, a native of County Cork, Ireland, served in the United States Marines, and received the Medal of Honor, for heroism in Cienfuegos, Cuba, in the Spanish–American War.
- Abby Kelley Foster an abolitionist, was a member of the Quaker Meeting House in Uxbridge. She led Lucy Stone and Susan B. Anthony into the cause. She was a resident of Millbury and Worcester.
- Judge Henry Chapin was a local attorney, historian, Unitarian Church leader, Chief Judge, and three term mayor of Worcester. Married to Abigail Baylies.
- Joshua Mason Macomber A.M., M.D, was a prominent early American educator, and Principal of the Uxbridge Academy, an historic New England Preparatory school. He became a physician and medical educator at the University of Pennsylvania, Medical College.
- Leonard White, MD, local health officer published in the medical literature describing early childhood vaccine related deaths in 1885. He published a report of an outbreak of malaria in town in 1896. Dr. Theobald Smith, the pathologist with the Massachusetts Board of Health, corresponded with Dr. White about the malaria in Uxbridge. This is among the earliest known links of malaria to mosquitoes in America, one year before Ronald Ross in India described the links to the Anopheles mosquito.
- Willard Bartlett Born in Uxbridge, Worcester County, Mass., October 14, 1846. Justice of the New York Supreme Court, 2nd District, 1884–1907; Justice of the Appellate Division of the New York Supreme Court 2nd Department, 1896–1906; judge of New York Court of Appeals, 1906–16; chief judge of New York Court of Appeals, 1913–16. He was from Brooklyn, Kings County, New York in adulthood.
- Franklin Bartlett Willard's brother who became a US Congressman representing NY State in the 1890s.

== 20th century ==
- Charles Arthur Root bought Scott's Mill, and later Capron Mill, and Rivulet mills. He and Edward Bachman of New York City, developed the Bachman Uxbridge Worsted Company into an enterprise with 13 plants, in 4 states with over 6,000 workers. The successor company, Bachmann Uxbridge (1953 sales, $52,609,000; profit, $272,000) would be by far the biggest woolen manufacturer in the country. (Time Magazine, 1953).
- Alice Bridges born in 1916, was a 20-year-old Uxbridge woman who won a Bronze medal for the backstroke in the 1936 Summer Olympics. She and her sister learned to swim at "Pout Pound" and the Whitin's Gym which had an Olympic pool since the 1920s. She apparently placed first, but Nazi politics ruled the day at the Berlin Olympics and she clinched the Bronze. The bridge across the Mumford River in the center of town was named for her in 2008. She died recently in Carlisle, Pennsylvania but continued swimming in her mid nineties.
- Harold Walter originally from Colorado, became the President of the Bachman Uxbridge Worsted Company. At its peak it was one of the most successful textile companies in America. The company had seven, and ultimately thirteen plants, nationwide, and was written up in Time magazine in August 1953 in an article entitled "the Pride of Uxbridge". The company led the women's fashion industry in America in 1953 with one of its products. Under his leadership, the company also led the industry in blended fabrics, and wool-nylon serge. Walter planned a merger of Bachman Uxbridge as a buy out of debt laden American Woolen which would have created America's largest woolen conglomerate(Time Magazine, 1954). Textron of Providence eventually won the competition.
- Richard T. Moore was in the 1990s, a local state senator, who served as Massachusetts chairman of President Bill Clinton's campaign, as the Associate Administrator of the Federal Emergency Management Agency (FEMA) under President Clinton. Moore focused his efforts on local emergency preparedness efforts and capacity for FEMA, 5 years before 9/11. He is now President Pro Tempore, of the Massachusetts State Senate, and recently served as a President of the National Conference of State Legislatures.
- Tim Fortugno graduated from Uxbridge High School in 1980, and played Professional baseball as a relief pitcher. Teams he played for included the California Angels, The Chicago White Sox, and the Cincinnati Reds.
- Jeannine Oppewall is a film art director and producer who has worked on more than 30 films and has 4 Academy Awards nominations. Jeanine was born in 1946 and raised in Uxbridge.

== 21st century ==
- Brian Skerry is an undersea photographer, now of Boston, who works with National Geographic.
- Jacqueline Liebergott president of the arts and communication school Emerson College from (1993–2011), was born in Uxbridge and spent her childhood there until moving to Maryland. Liebergott announced her retirement for 2011, in late 2009. She was the first woman to serve as Emerson's president.
- Richard T. Moore (Dick Moore) was the chief architect who helped craft the landmark Massachusetts health care reform legislation in 2006, a forerunner to the Affordable Health Care Act of 2010. Moore served as President of the U.S. Conference of state legislatures in 2010–2011. He was a Federal Emergency Management Agency executive under President Bill Clinton, and helped develop local preparedness efforts at the National level from 1994 to 1996. He chaired Clinton's Presidential Campaign in Massachusetts.
- Charles Vacanti, Anasthesiologist; Tissue engineering; Stem Cells; Known for the Vacanti Mouse
- Arthur K. Wheelock Jr., an Uxbridge native, was curator of Dutch painting at the National Gallery of Art in Washington, D.C. from 1975 to 2018.

== See also ==
- List of people from Massachusetts
- The Tafts of Mendon and Uxbridge
