= Samuel Willard (disambiguation) =

Samuel Willard (1640–1707) was an American colonial clergyman.

Samuel Willard may also refer to:

- Samuel Willard (physician) (1748–1801), American physician
- Samuel George Willard (1819–1887), American clergyman and politician
