= Edward P. Bullard Jr. =

American engineer, president of the Bullard Machine Tool Company

Edward Payson Bullard Jr. (July 10, 1872 – June 26, 1953) was an American engineer, president of the Bullard Machine Tool Company for 40 years, and inventor. He was awarded the ASME Medal in 1937.

Bullard was born in Columbus, Ohio, as son of Edward Payson Bullard Sr. and Alice Martha (Camp) Bullard. After attending Williston Seminary until 1891, he studied at Amherst College from 1890 to 1892. After his graduation he spent his entire career at Bridgeport Machine Tool Co.

Bullard Jr. continued the family machine tool business and brought the turret principle to the vertical boring mill, making it a vertical turret lathe. He led the development of the company's multiple-spindle Mult-Au-Matic brand machine that became an important automatic lathe in the mass production of parts for the automotive industry. He was president of the company for 40 years, through World War I, the interwar period, and World War II, a period during which the Bullard company was the largest machine tool builder in the U.S., and vast volumes of military matériel were produced by countless companies running Bullard machines.

== Selected publications ==
- Patent Rotary-table bearing. US 828876 A, 1905–06.
- Patent Counterbalancing device. US 828875 A, 1905–06.
- Patent Controlling means for machine-tools, US 1382340 A, 1921.
