= Francis Henry Williams =

American physician (1852–1936)

Francis Henry Williams (15 April 1852–22 June 1936) was an American medical doctor, a pioneer in the field of radiology.

== Biography ==
Williams was born on 15 April 1852, in Uxbridge, Massachusetts. His father was Professor of Ophthalmology at Harvard Medical School. Williams graduated from Massachusetts Institute of Technology in 1873, at the age of twenty-one, then studied medicine at Harvard University, where he obtained his Doctorate in Medicine in 1877. He then spent two years studying in Europe before returning to Boston to practice as a physician. He was awarded the titles of Instructor in Materia Medica and Therapeutics and Assistant Professor of Therapeutics from Harvard Medical School.

In 1892, he introduced bacterial examination to Boston City Hospital, and in 1894 was the first physician in the region to neutralize diphtheria with antitoxin. In 1895, Wilhelm Röntgen discovered X-rays ("Röntgen rays"); Williams lost no time in applying this innovation, beginning his use of fluoroscopy in 1896. Williams performed trials of Röntgen's experiments at the MIT laboratories, and conducted research on the diagnostic potential of X-rays for different conditions, including thoracic aneurysm, pericardial effusion, cardiac hypertrophy, pulmonary tuberculosis, and emphysema. He founded what would become the Department of Radiology at Boston City Hospital, at first working out of a basement room at MIT. He was also early in devising means of protection from radiation for patients and doctors. He collaborated with his brother-in-law, Dr. William Rollins, on several inventions that advanced the radiology of the time.

Because of the long exposure time required by early X-ray photographs, Williams preferred real-time fluoroscopy; by 1897 he had produced over 400 volumes of drawings, of around 250 pages each, depicting various chest diseases. He also was an early proponent of radiation therapy. Williams dedicated special attention to the possibilities presented by fluoroscopy for the diagnosis of cardiovascular diseases.

In 1930, he retired as a physician, but continued to contribute articles to academic publications until his death in 1936. His book The Roentgen Rays in Medicine and Surgery (1901) was instrumental in spreading awareness of new developments in radiology, and by 1903 was in its third edition. The book has been described as "the beginning of American radiological literature."

Williams was a member of many learned societies, including the American Association for the Advancement of Science, the American Academy of Arts and Sciences, the Association of American Physicians, the American Röntgen Ray Society, the American Radium Society, and the Radiological Society of North America.
