= Bay State Arms =

The Bay State Arms Company was a Massachusetts-based maker of single-barrel shotguns and falling block rifles. It operated from 1870 to 1902.

== History ==
The company was founded in Worcester, Massachusetts in 1870. c. 1873–1874 it was moved to Uxbridge, Massachusetts. Local references in Uxbridge date the company in the 1880s located on the Mumford River at Seth Reads old Gristmill established in the 1770s. It appears that around 1874 the company was discontinued. The business was reorganized in 1880 in Worcester, Massachusetts making "Bay State Gun" branded firearms. In 1909 the company was purchased by Hopkins & Allen Arms Company of Norwich, Connecticut which continued to use the "Bay State" brand name on single-barrel shotguns.

== Other uses of the name ==
The trade name "Bay State" was also used by H & R Firearms on single barrel guns. Harrington & Richardson was active from 1872 to 1985.
