= Jerry Wheelock =

- Born: September 19, 1784; Uxbridge, Massachusetts, US
- Died: October 10, 1861 (aged 77); Uxbridge, Massachusetts, US
- Occupation: Textile pioneer at Uxbridge
- Known for: Early American Textile Pioneer
- Spouse: Sukey Day
- Children: Charles A Wheelock
- Parent(s): Simeon Wheelock and Deborah (Thayer) Wheelock

Jeremiah Wheelock (September 19, 1782 – 10 October 1861) was an American early industrial pioneer in the Blackstone Valley of Massachusetts, a region that incubated the early American industrial revolution.

== Family ==
He was the youngest son of Simeon and Deborah Thayer Wheelock of Uxbridge, MA, and was born September 19, 1784, at Uxbridge. He was a sixth generation descendant of the first Wheelock settler, Rev. Ralph Wheelock. The Rev. Ralph Wheelock of Dedham, MA who had been a contemporary of John Milton at Oxford University and who was a Puritan minister in the 1630s, had been the first to establish public education in America. Jerry was the youngest of eight in the Wheelock family at Uxbridge and was born just after the end of the Revolutionary War.

His father Simeon, had been a blacksmith, the town clerk, and a Lieutenant at Lexington and Concord in the Massachusetts Militia which preceded the more organized Continental Army. His father Simeon was killed in war action around two years after Jerry's birth. Simeon died in September 1786 at the age of 45 when his horse slipped on the ice while engaged in the suppression of Shays' Rebellion in Springfield.

His mother, who raised him primarily by herself, became his principal teacher, although Uxbridge had a basic school since 1732. At an early age Jerry was "put out to learn a trade" as a maker of tubs, and pails.

=== Ancestry ===
Jerry Wheelock is a 3rd great grandson of Ralph Wheelock (1600–1683).

== An industrial incubator and early work experiences ==
There was plentiful "bog" iron ore in Uxbridge, and at least three local forges for metal working and a working triphammer established by Caleb Handy at Ironstone, Massachusetts. In 1810/1811 Daniel Day completed the first woolen mill at Uxbridge in 1809, a town that one day would be headquarters and next in line to become America's largest woolen company. Jerry married Sukey Day (1789–1875), the daughter of Daniel and Sylvia Wheelock (maiden; 1764–1842) January 24, 1811, in Uxbridge.

Jerry soon became a full partner with Daniel Day &vCo. in the Carding machine company first established near the junction of the West and Blackstone Rivers. After a few years, Jerry worked for Artemus Dryden of Holden, MA, which manufactured Carding machines near Worcester, MA the county seat. Carding machine manufacture in Worcester County began with Pliny Earle I at Leicester, MA, (near Holden), as early as the 1780s.

Jerry then was employed with the newly formed Rivulet Manufacturing company, founded by Chandler Taft in North Uxbridge in 1814, and worked his way up to Superintendent. He later struck out on his own and manufactured his own machinery at Uxbridge until 1833 (age 49). He and one of his sons, Charles Augustus Wheelock (1812–1895), then entered into a manufacturing business known as Jerry Wheelock and Son. His grandson Silas Wheelock joined the business in the 1840s.

== Historic Significance ==
The Blackstone Valley would later be known as a historic corridor of national significance to America's earliest industrialization. The woolen mill started by Daniel Day and Jerry Wheelock continues today, two centuries later, under the name of Berroco Inc. a yarn distribution company, with headquarters for many years in the Elmdale section of Uxbridge, where Daniel and Jerry started the first woolen mill. More recently it has since moved to nearby North Smithfield, Rhode Island.

== Death ==
Jerry died at Uxbridge on October 10, 1861, at the age of 77.

== Notes and references ==
=== Notes ===
- Other sources of Family information to corroborate information: Wheelock College and family records, Daughters of the American Revolution, Genealogy.com/wheelock etc.
