= Baxter Hall =

American military officer (1757–1842)

- Born: 1757; Uxbridge, Massachusetts, US
- Died: 1842 (aged 84–85); Uxbridge, Massachusetts, US
- Military career
- Allegiance: United States
- Branch: Massachusetts Militia Continental Army
- Service years: 1775–1780
- Rank: Captain
- Units: Massachusetts 26th and others
- Conflicts: Battle of Bunker Hill; Lexington Alarm

Baxter Hall (1757 – 1842) was an American military officer in the Continental Army, and a militia captain, of significance to the American Revolution.

== Family ==
Baxter Hall was one of nine children born to Lieutenant Nehemiah Hall and Sarah (Hayward), daughter of John Hayward and Hannah Baxter, in Uxbridge, Massachusetts, on October 10, 1757. Nehemiah Hall and his wife, Sarah, had nine children (all born in Uxbridge): John (3 Oct 1751 – 30 May 1755); Nathan (29 Aug 1753 – 13 Mar 1835); John (30 Jun 1755 – date ?); Baxter (10 Oct 1757 – 4 Jul 1842); Hannah (10 Oct 1759 – before 1768); David (2 Oct 1762 – 25 Jul 1798); Nehemiah (7 Dec 1764 – 29 Dec 1842); Hannah (19 Mar 1768 - ?); and Jonathan (18 Sep 1770 – 27 Jul 1848).

The Baxter family (where Baxter Hall got his name from) were one of the founding families of Quincy, Massachusetts, with Gregory Baxter and his wife, Margaret Paddy. Their daughter, Abigail Baxter, married Joseph Adams and were President John Adams' Great Grandparents.

Baxter Hall's brothers Nehemiah and David also served during the American Revolution and are also buried in Prospect Hill Cemetery in Uxbridge, MA. His father, Nehemiah Hall Sr., was appointed of a committee on July 6, 1774, "to correspond with committees that now or shall be chosen by any towns in this province for the purpose on any Matur (matter) that my respect the present difficulty that now or may subsist between Great Britain and North America." This committee consisted of Samuel Read, Joshua Wood, Moses Taft, Seth Read, Joseph Chapin, Moses Keith, Dexter Wood, Simeon Wheelock, and Nehemiah Hall.

== Revolutionary War service ==
Baxter Hall was a Lexington and Bunker Hill Drummer who responded to the alarm at Lexington of April 19, 1775 with the Uxbridge Militia Company, under Captain Joseph Chapin.

He was an officer in the American Revolutionary War and also served as a drummer in Captain Samuel (or Seth) Read's company. He then served in Lieutenant Colonel Nathan Tyler's regiment (from Uxbridge) from January 21, 1777, to December 8, 1777, at Rhode Island. Later commands he served under included: Captain Job Knapp's company, and Colonel Job Cushing's regiment in the northern army, Captain Edward Seagrave, Colonel Wood, Captain Caleb Whiting, Colonel Benjamin Hawes, Captain Thomas Marshal Baker's company, and Colonel Samuel Denny's regiment.

== Service at West Point ==
Baxter Hall went to West Point in 1780. He served from July to October in Captain Benjamin Read's company, part of Colonel John Rand's regiment. He was promoted to the rank of captain, (militia), known as Captain Baxter Hall, while at West Point. He and his men were sent on a wild goose chase by General Benedict Arnold during Arnold's escape to the British side, near the end of the war; Baxter Hall remained behind at the headquarters.

== Later life ==
Captain Baxter Hall is buried in the Prospect Hill Cemetery

He moved to Whitingham, Vermont before 1800, where he was a farmer. He was married at Whittingham, Vermont, and had seven children with his first wife Lydia. His second marriage was in Sutton, Massachusetts, the next town to Uxbridge, where he married Martha Patty Putnam. He had one son with his second wife. In 1830, after the death of his second wife, he returned to Uxbridge to live with his daughter Maranda. He died in 1842, aged 84 or 85, and is buried in the Prospect Hill Cemetery in Uxbridge. Two early US Congressman are buried in the same cemetery, along with other Revolutionary soldiers. Benedict Arnold's widow, known locally as "Sarah Arnold", may have died at Uxbridge in 1836, while Baxter Hall resided here. The photograph depicts the Prospect Hill Cemetery (foreground) where Baxter Hall is interred. The mill in the background manufactured US military uniforms for over 140 years, starting in 1820 while Baxter Hall lived nearby.

== Significance in history ==
Baxter Hall drummed for the first "muster" of the American Revolution.
