= Uxbridge, Massachusetts =

- Town
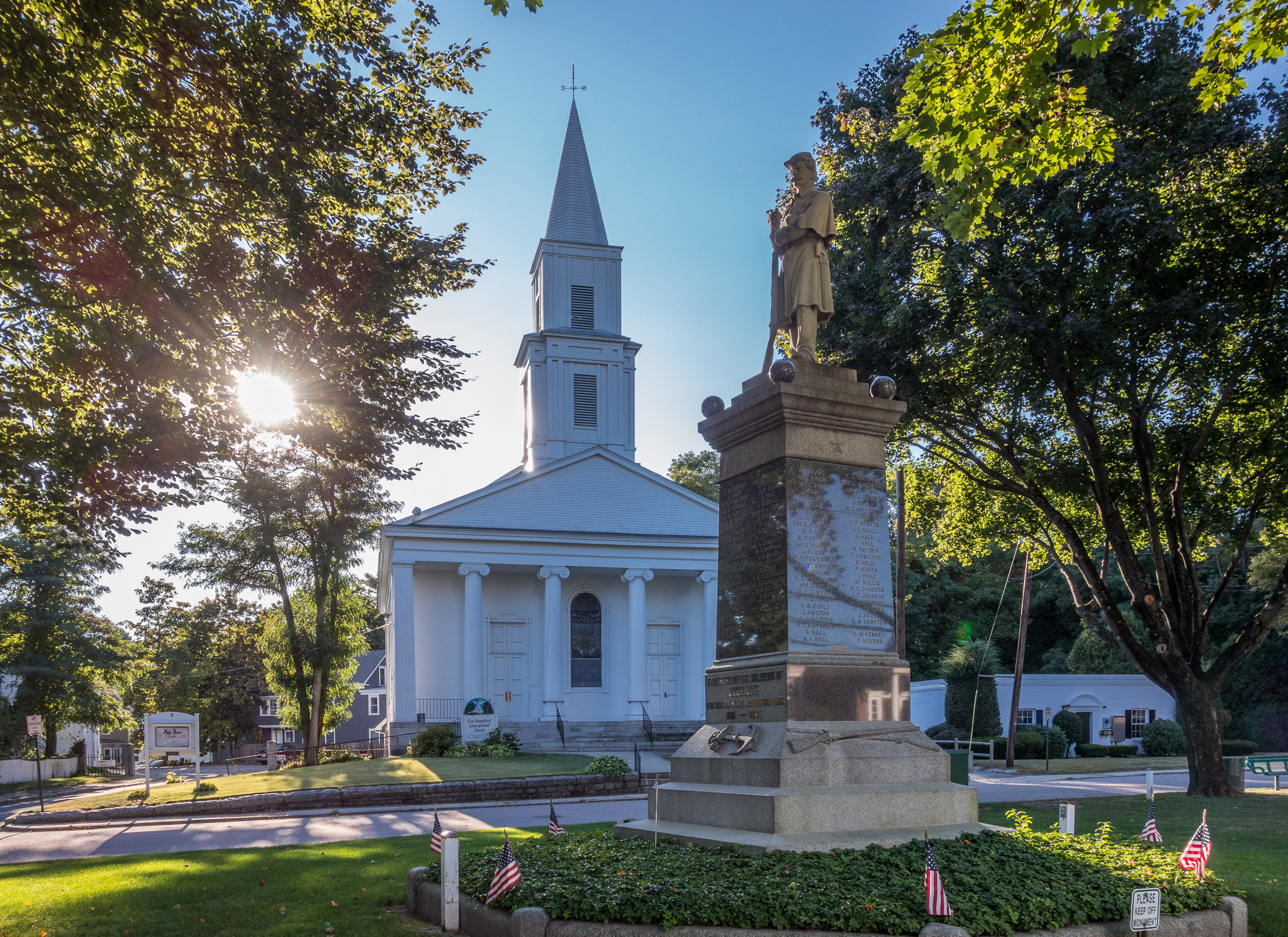
- Congregational Church and Civil War Memorial

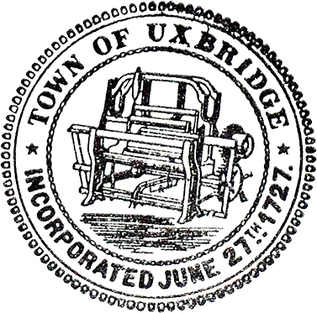
- Flag Seal
- Nicknames: "Cradle of the Industrial Revolution"; "Heart of the Blackstone Valley"; "A Crossroads Village"
- Mottoes: "Weaving a Tapestry of Early America"; "President George Washington really did sleep here"
- Location in Worcester County and the state of Massachusetts
- Coordinates: 42°04′38″N 71°37′48″W
- Country: United States
- State: Massachusetts
- County: Worcester
- Colonized: 1662
- Incorporated: 1727

Government
  - Type: Open town meeting
  - Chair, Select Board: Brian Butler
  - Vice Chair-Clerk, Select Board: Jeff Shaw
  - Select Board Members: Stephen Mandile, John Wise, Peter Demers

Area
  - Total: 30.4 sq mi (78.7 km^{2})
  - Land: 29.5 sq mi (76.5 km^{2})
  - Water: 0.81 sq mi (2.1 km^{2})
- Elevation: 269 ft (82 m)

Population (2020)
  - Total: 14,162
  - Density: 479/sq mi (185.1/km^{2})
- Time zone: UTC-5 (Eastern)
  - Summer (DST): UTC-4 (Eastern)
- ZIP Codes: 01569 (Uxbridge); 01538 (North Uxbridge); 01516 (Douglas)
- Area code: 508 / 774
- FIPS code: 25-71620
- GNIS feature ID: 0618387
- Website: www.uxbridge-ma.gov

Uxbridge, a town in Worcester County, Massachusetts, was incorporated in 1727 from a part of Mendon, and named for the Earl of Uxbridge. The town is located 36 mi (58 km) southwest of Boston and 15 mi (24 km) south-southeast of Worcester. The historical society says Uxbridge is the "Heart of The Blackstone Valley" and a “Cradle of the Industrial Revolution". Uxbridge, an early Textile center in the American Industrial Revolution, became a rural hub in the abolition movement. Uxbridge has a credible claim as an early incubator of the American woolen industry.

Sachems of the Nipmuc deeded land to 17th-century settlers. Uxbridge history claims a first colonial woman voter, Lydia Taft, and Massachusetts’ first women jurors. The first private hospital for mental illness was here. Deborah Sampson posed as an Uxbridge soldier, and fought in the American Revolution. A 140-year legacy of manufacturing military uniforms, cashmeres and clothing began with 1820 power looms. "Uxbridge Blue", was the first US Air Force Dress Uniform.

In 2026, BJ's Wholesale Club, Amazon, and other distribution centers reflect the transformation of the towns economy from historic textile looms to modern logistics. World Atlas named Uxbridge to a list of top places to live in Massachusetts Uxbridge had a population of 14,162 at the 2020 United States census.

== History ==
(see Upton, Massachusetts for prehistory)

=== Colonial era, Revolution, Quakers, and abolition ===
“Great John” aka Wutaushauk, Annawassanauke and Quashaamitt sold Squimshepauk plantation to settlers in September 1663, "for 24 pound Ster". Mendon began in 1667, burned in King Phillips War, and was resettled in 1680.

Western Mendon became Uxbridge in 1727, and Farnum House held the first town meeting. John Adams' uncle, Nathan Webb, was the first local minister in the Great Awakening. The American Taft family was prominent locally.

Colonial Uxbridge included Northbridge until 1772. In 1770, Colonel, James Fletcher, built his house, in Uxbridge and his forge later became Whitin Machine.

Seth and Joseph Read and Simeon Wheelock joined Committees of Correspondence. Baxter Hall was a Minuteman drummer. Seth Read fought at Bunker Hill. Washington stopped at Reed's tavern, en route to command the Continental Army. Samuel Spring was an early Revolutionary war chaplain. Deborah Sampson enlisted as "Robert Shurtlieff of Uxbridge".

Shays' Rebellion led Governor John Hancock to quell Uxbridge riots. Simeon Wheelock died protecting the Springfield Armory.

Seth Reed was instrumental in adding "E pluribus unum" to U.S. coins. Washington slept here on his Inaugural tour.

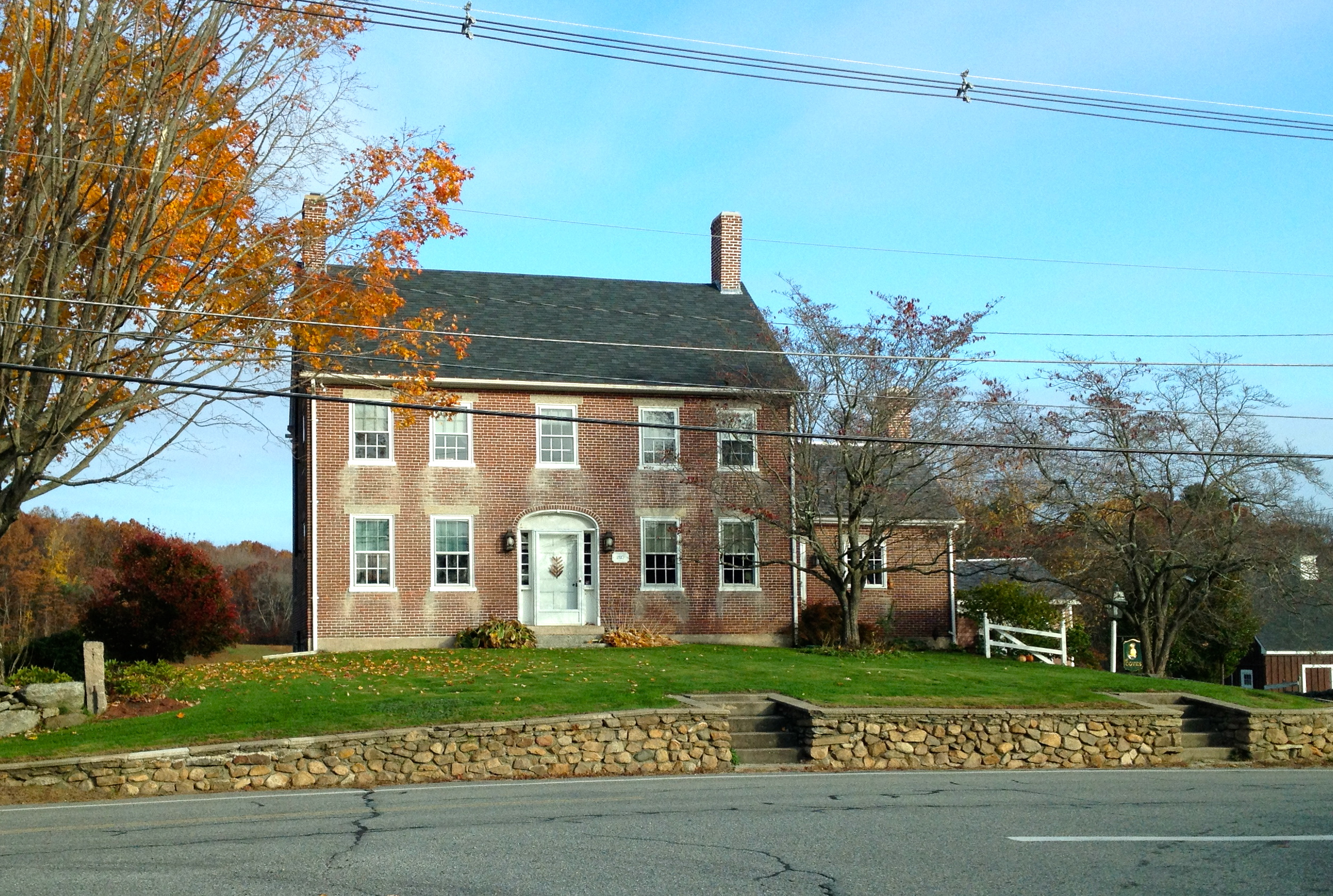
Jacob Aldrich House; Quaker style house

Quakers migrated from Smithfield, Rhode Island, and built mills, railroads, houses, tools and Conestoga wagon wheels. Southwick's store housed the Social and Instructive Library. Friends Meetinghouse had prominent abolitionists Abby Kelley Foster and Effingham Capron as members.

Caprons led the 450 member local anti-slavery society. Brister Pierce, a former Uxbridge slave signed an 1835 petition for abolition of slavery in the District of Columbia. The anti-slavery movement locally had leadership from the Unitarian and Quaker communities.

=== Early transportation, education, public health and safety ===
The Tafts built a Blackstone River bridge in 1709. "Teamsters" drove horse "team" freight wagons on the Worcester-Providence stage route. The Blackstone Canal brought horse-drawn barges to Providence through Uxbridge for overnight stops. The "crossroads village" was a junction on the Underground Railroad. The P&W Railroad ended canal traffic in 1848.

A 1732 vote "set up a school for ye town of Uxbridge". A grammar school was followed by 13 one-room district school houses, built for $2000 in 1797. The local Masonic Lodge housed the prestigious Uxbridge Academy (1818).

Uxbridge voted against the smallpox vaccine. Samuel Willard treated smallpox victims, and led the first private mental health asylum. Vital records recorded many infant deaths, the smallpox death of Selectman Joseph Richardson, "Quincy", "dysentary", and tuberculosis deaths. Leonard White recorded a malaria outbreak that led to early mosquito control efforts. Peter Emerick summarized the history of policing in Uxbridge.

=== Industrial era: 19th century to late 20th century ===
Bog iron and iron forges marked the colonial era, with the inception of large-scale industries beginning around 1775. Examples of this development include the work of Richard Mowry, who built and marketed equipment to manufacture woolen, linen, or cotton cloth, and gristmills, sawmills, distilleries, and large industries. Daniel Day built the first woolen mill in 1809. By 1855, 560 local workers made 2,500,000 yards (2,300,000 m) of cloth (14,204 miles (22,859 km)). Uxbridge had twenty different industrial mills.

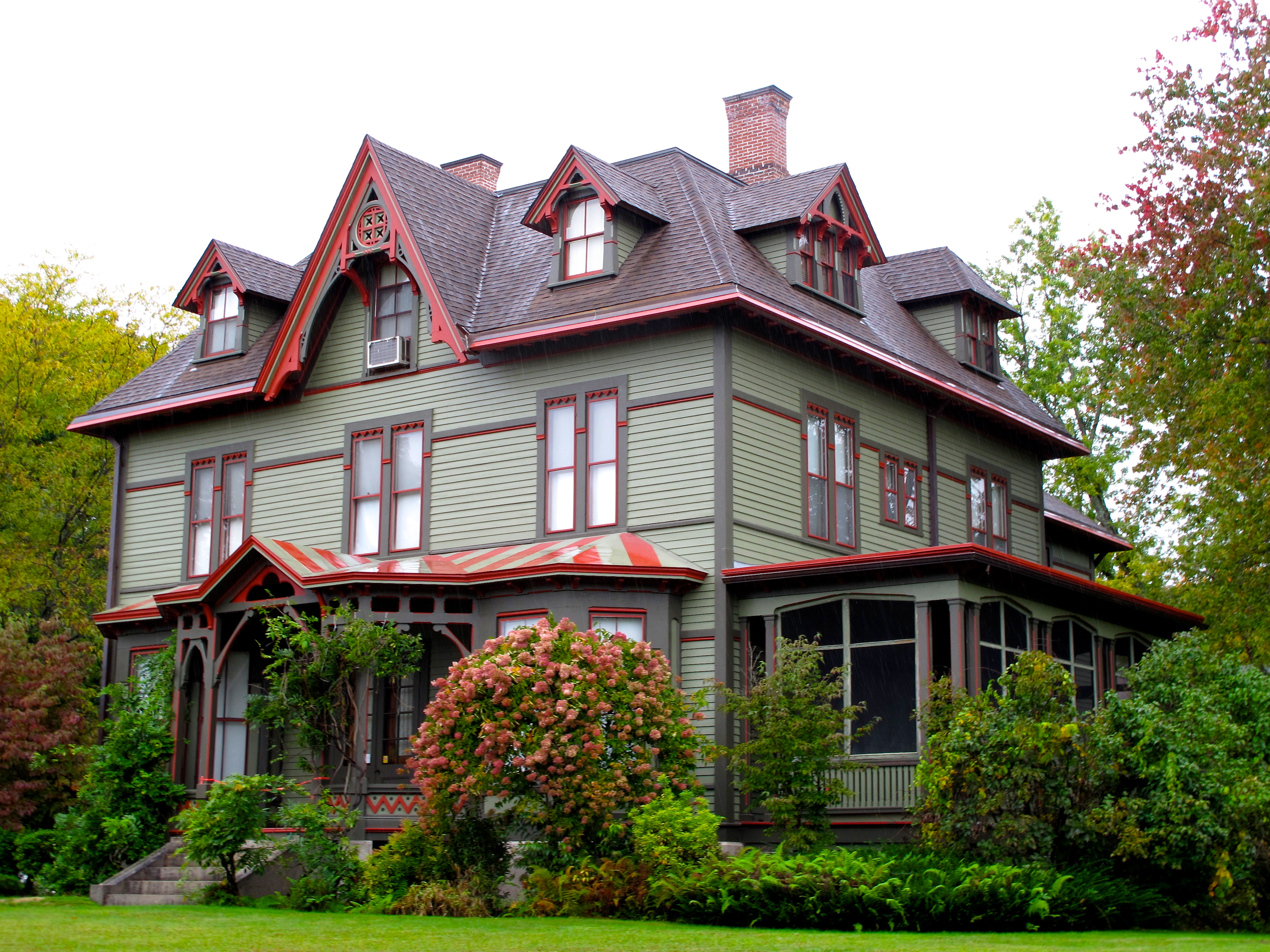
Charles Capron House. The Capron family was prominent in the Industrial era at Uxbridge Center where Capron Mill is located.

Innovations included power looms, vertical integration of wool to clothing, cashmere wool-synthetic blends, "wash and wear", yarn spinning techniques, and latch hook kits. Villages included mills, shops, worker housing, and farms.

Wm. Arnold's Ironstone cotton mill, later made Kentucky Blue Jeans, and Seth Read's gristmill, later housed Bay State Arms. Hecla and Wheelockville housed American Woolen, Waucantuck Mill, Hilena Lowell's shoe factory, and Draper Corporation. Daniel Day, Jerry Wheelock, and Luke Taft used water-powered mills. Moses Taft's (Central Woolen) operated continuously making Civil War cloth.

North Uxbridge housed Clapp's 1810 cotton mill, Chandler Taft's and Richard Sayles' Rivulet Mill, the granite quarry, and Rogerson's village.

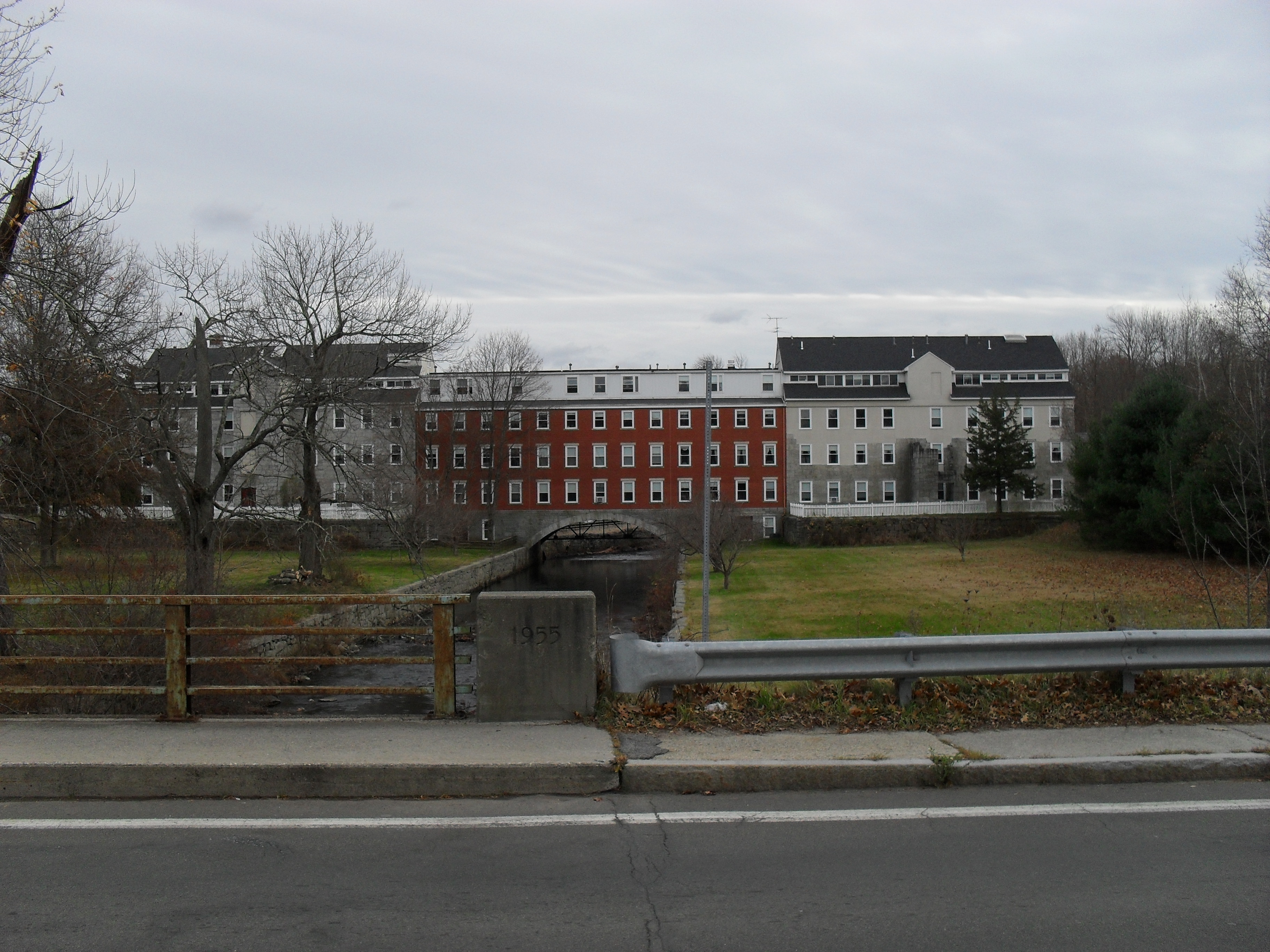
Crown and Eagle Mill. Crown and Eagle Mill at Rogerson's Village was a historic New England mill and village which was renovated after a 1971 fire. It was considered a masterpiece of early American industrial architecture.

Crown and Eagle Mill was "a masterpiece of early industrial architecture". Blanchard's granite quarry provided curb stones to New York City, the Statue of Liberty and regional public works projects. William Howard Taft, visited Samuel Taft House.

John Caprons mill pioneered US satinets and woolen power looms. Charles A. Root, Edward Bachman, and Harold Walter expanded Bachman-Uxbridge Worsted nationally, to lead the industry in woolens, synthetic blends and women's fashion. The local plant manufactured US Army uniforms for the Civil War, World War I, World War II, the nurse corps, and the first Air Force dress uniforms, dubbed "Uxbridge Blue". Uxbridge Worsted peaked in 1954 and closed a decade later.

The Uxbridge Worsted factory became Bernat Yarn’s largest plant until that also closed. Textile mills waned and were repurposed in later years.

=== Late 20th century, early 21st century ===
Blackstone River and Canal Heritage State Park

The Blackstone river was restored after mills closed and the National Park service reproduced Project Zap curriculum for student engagement. The Blackstone River Valley National Heritage Corridor contains the 1,000-acre (4.0 km^{2})Blackstone Canal Heritage State Park, 9 miles (14 km) of the Blackstone River Greenway, the Southern New England Trunkline Trail (which has the interesting SNETT stone chamber south of Lee pond), West Hill Dam, a 567-acre wildlife refuge, parcels of the Metacomet Land Trust, and Cormier Woods. 60 Federalist homes were added to 54 national and 375 state-listed historic sites. Elmshade typified Georgian architecture. Capron's wooden mill survived a 2007 fire at the Bernat Mill. The Great Gatsby (1974) and Oliver's Story (1978) were filmed locally.

== Geography ==
The town is 30.4 square miles (79 km^{2}), of which 0.8 square miles (2.1 km^{2}), or 2.74%, is water. It is situated 39.77 miles (64.00 km) southwest of Boston, 16 miles (26 km) southeast of Worcester, and 20 miles (32 km) northwest of Providence. Elevations range from 200 feet (61 m) to 577 feet (176 m) above sea level. It borders Douglas, Mendon, Millville, Northbridge, and Sutton, Massachusetts, plus the Rhode Island towns of Burrillville and North Smithfield.

=== Climate ===
A USDA hardiness zone 5 continental climate prevails with snowfall extremes from November to April. The highest recorded temperature was 104 F, in July 1975, and the lowest, −25 F in January 1957.

Climate data for Uxbridge, Massachusetts
Month	Jan	Feb	Mar	Apr	May	Jun	Jul	Aug	Sep	Oct	Nov	Dec	Year
Mean daily maximum °F (°C)	37 (3)	40 (4)	49 (9)	59 (15)	70 (21)	79 (26)	84 (29)	82 (28)	75 (24)	64 (18)	53 (12)	42 (6)	61 (16)
Mean daily minimum °F (°C)	13 (−11)	16 (−9)	27 (−3)	37 (3)	47 (8)	55 (13)	60 (16)	59 (15)	49 (9)	37 (3)	30 (−1)	20 (−7)	38 (3)
Average precipitation inches (mm)	3.6 (91)	3.3 (84)	4.1 (100)	3.9 (99)	4.3 (110)	3.6 (91)	3.7 (94)	4.1 (100)	4.1 (100)	4.1 (100)	4.5 (110)	4.0 (100)	47.3 (1,200)
Source: Weather.com

== Demographics ==
Historical population
Year	Pop.	±%
1790	1,308	—
1800	1,404	+7.3%
1810	1,404	+0.0%
1820	1,551	+10.5%
1830	2,086	+34.5%
1840	2,004	−3.9%
1850	2,457	+22.6%
1860	3,133	+27.5%
1870	3,058	−2.4%
1880	3,111	+1.7%
1890	3,408	+9.5%
1900	3,599	+5.6%
1910	4,671	+29.8%
1920	5,384	+15.3%
1930	6,285	+16.7%
1940	6,417	+2.1%
1950	7,007	+9.2%
1960	7,789	+11.2%
1970	8,253	+6.0%
1980	8,374	+1.5%
1990	10,415	+24.4%
2000	11,156	+7.1%
2010	13,457	+20.6%
2020	14,162	+5.2%
2024*	14,703	+3.8%
* = population estimate. Source: United States census records and Population Estimates Program data.

The 2010 United States census population was 13,457, representing a growth rate of 20.6%, with 5,056 households, a density rate of 166.31 units per square mile. 95.7% were White, 1.7% Asian, 0.90% Hispanic, 0.3% African American, and 1.4% other. Population density was 442.66 people/ mile^{2} (170.77/km^{2}). Per capita income was $24,540, and 4.7% fell below the poverty line. There were 9,959 registered voters in 2010.

== Economy ==
Light industry, logistics, public education, and small businesses offer local jobs. The MA146 corridor is becoming New England’s logistics hub. MA146 corridor businesses include: BJ's Wholesale Club's, northern division’s 618,000 square feet (57,400 m2) logistics center, German based Lenze Americas corporate HQ and logistics center,,Medline Inc.’s 840,000 square foot distribution center,, and McKesson’s 15 year lease of a 442,000 square foot facilityAmazon owns an ORH5 robotics sort center and in 2026 expanded its footprint by leasing an additional 450,000 square feet. Unilock added a $50 million expansion in South Uxbridge.Cultivate continues to grow. Koopman’s has a logistic center, and partners with Cornerstone which manufactures trusses. McGovern auto group purchased Rivulet mill for upfitting of municipal trucks, EMS/fire and police fleets.

== Arts and culture ==
=== Points of interest ===
- Blackstone River Valley National Heritage Corridor
- Blackstone Canal at River Bend Farm,Blackstone River and Canal Heritage State Park
- West Hill Dam and recreation area
- Farnum house 1710, local museum and home of the Uxbridge Historical Society.
- An antique fire museum was completed in the former North Uxbridge fire station.
- Blackstone Valley Art Association

== Parks and recreation ==
- Blissful Meadows Golf Club
- Blackstone River Greenway
- Southern New England Trunkline Trail

== Government ==
Uxbridge has a select board and open town meeting government.

Local government granted the first woman in America the right to vote, nixed a smallpox vaccine in 1775, and defied the Massachusetts Secretary of State by approving women jurors. The 2009 Board of Health made Uxbridge the third community in the US to ban tobacco sales in pharmacies, but later reversed this.

=== State and federal government ===
State government
State Representative(s):	Michael Soter (R) Joseph McKenna (R)
State Senator(s):	Ryan Fattman (R)
Governor's Councilor(s):	Paul DePalo (D)
Federal government
U.S. Representative(s):	Jim McGovern (D-2nd District),
U.S. Senators:	Elizabeth Warren (D), Ed Markey (D)

== Education ==
Local schools include the Earl D. Taft Early Learning Center (Pre-K–3), Whitin Intermediate School (4–7), Uxbridge High School (8–12), and Our Lady of the Valley Regional.

Uxbridge is also a member of one of the thirteen towns of the Blackstone Valley Regional Vocational School District. Uxbridge students in eighth grade have the opportunity to apply to Blackstone Valley Regional Vocational Technical High School, serving grades 9–12.

== Infrastructure ==
=== Transportation ===
==== Rail ====
The nearest MBTA Commuter Rail stops are Forge Park/495, 11.5 miles, (18.5km) and Grafton /Worcester, 12.6 miles, (20.8 km). The Providence and Worcester Railroad freight line passes through Uxbridge. Acela high speed rail is available in Providence, 20 miles, (32.2 km).

==== Highways ====
Highways in Uxbridge include one freeway, Route 146, and state roads Route 16, Route 122, Route 98 and Route 146A.

==== Airports ====
TF Green State Airport Warwick-Providence, RI 32 miles (51.5 km)Worcester Regional Airport 17 miles, (27.4 km) and Boston Logan International Airport 42 miles, (67.6 km), have commercial flights. Hopedale Airport, 7.2 miles (11.6 km) away, and Worcester Regional Airport have general aviation.

=== Healthcare ===
Tri-River Family Health Center (University of Massachusetts Medical School) offers primary care. Milford Regional, Landmark Medical Center, hospices and long-term care are nearby or local.

=== Public safety ===
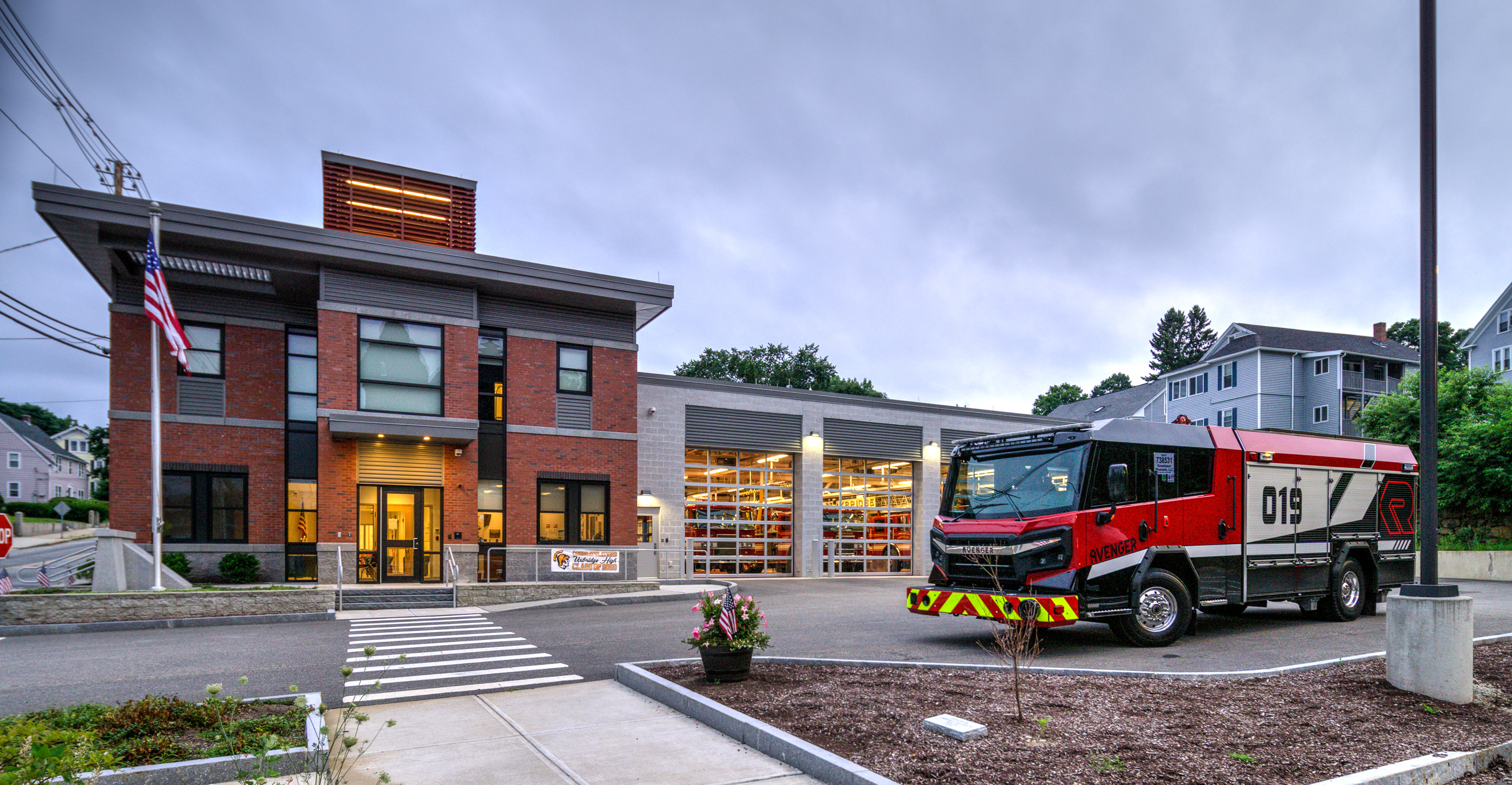
Uxbridge fire station

In 2017, a new $9.25 million fire station was completed on Main Street next to Town Hall. Voters approved the 14,365 square-foot station in 2015. The station has five bays to accommodate modern fire trucks, a radio and server room for computer and phone servers.

== Notable people ==
- Benjamin Adams, congressman
- Willard Bartlett, New York chief justice
- Nicholas Baylies, born and raised in Uxbridge; served as a justice of the Vermont Supreme Court
- Ezra ("T".) Taft Benson, LDS Church apostle, Hawaii missionary, and Utah legislator; built the 1814 Rivulet Mill
- Alice Bridges, won an Olympic bronze in Berlin
- Phineas Bruce, congressman
- Edward P. Bullard, started Bullard Machine Tool Company, whose designs enabled auto manufacturing and industry
- Tyler Burton, NBA second round draft pick candidate in 2022 but withdraw to play for Villanova University; born in Uxbridge in 2000, in 2026 played for the NBA Memphis Grizzlies.
- Effingham Capron, led Uxbridge as a center for pre-Civil War anti-slavery activities; state and national anti-slavery leader; industrialist
- Julius Angelo Carpenter, born in Uxbridge; founded Carpentersville, Illinois; served in the Illinois House of Representatives
- Daniel Day, a Taft, started the third US woolen mill
- Eugene A. Ford, a Mississippi native; lived in Uxbridge; developed the first laboratory for IBM in Uxbridge; first chief engineer for IBM
- Tim Fortugno, played for the California Angels and Chicago White Sox
- Albert Harkness, Uxbridge High; academic Latin scholar; published multiple works
- Kevin Kuros, former state legislator; from Uxbridge
- Jacqueline Liebergott, president of Emerson College
- Arthur MacArthur Sr., lt. governor, chief justice, Douglas MacArthur's grandfather
- Joshua Macomber, educator
- Mike Mahoney, former head coach of Murray State University; played for Southern Connecticut
- Richard Moore, Senate president pro tem (MA), FEMA executive, past president of the Conference of State Legislatures, and a principal architect of Massachusetts's landmark health care law
- William Augustus Mowry, educator
- Jeannine Oppewall, four Academy Award nominations for best art direction
- Willard Preston, 4th University of Vermont president, published famous sermons while later serving the Independent Presbyterian Church of Savannah, Georgia
- Joseph Read, colonel in the American Revolutionary War
- Seth Reed, fought at Bunker Hill, was instrumental in adding "E pluribus unum" to U.S. coins, a pioneer/founder of Erie, Pennsylvania and Geneva, New York
- Brian Skerry, National Geographic photojournalist, protecting global sea life
- Edward Sullivan, won a Congressional Medal of Honor in the Spanish–American War
- Bezaleel Taft Jr., state representative and state senator; owned historic Elmshade Taft family homestead
- Bezaleel Taft Sr., American Revolution captain, state representative and state senator
- Josiah Taft, wealthy landowner, husband of Lydia Taft
- Luke Taft, built two water-powered textile mills
- Lydia (Chapin) Taft, first woman to vote in America
- Moses Taft, built Stanley Woolen Mill; implicated in the Boston Molasses Disaster
- Peter Rawson Taft I, grandfather of William Howard Taft
- Robert Taft I, patriarch to the Taft family political dynasty
- Robert Taft, 2nd, selectman
- Samuel Taft, hosted George Washington on his post-inaugural tour
- Charles Vacanti, anasthesiologist; tissue engineering; stem cells; known for the Vacanti mouse
- Nathan Webb, first called minister at new Congregational Church, first mentioned in Great Awakening period, John Adams' uncle
- Arthur K. Wheelock Jr., curator of Northern Baroque art at the National Gallery of Art from 1975 to his retirement in 2018
- Leonard White, early Uxbridge physician and health officer who was involved in the study of mosquitoes and malaria
- Paul C. Whitin, founded the Whitin Machine Works; transformed cotton machine manufacturing
- Samuel Willard, early Uxbridge physician who was a pioneer in mental health treatment
- Francis Henry Williams, physician who was a pioneer of radiology.

== See also ==
- List of notable Uxbridge people by century
- Linwood, Massachusetts
- List of mill towns in Massachusetts
