= Edward Sullivan (Medal of Honor) =

Corporal Edward Sullivan
- Born: May 16, 1870; Cork, Ireland
- Died: March 11, 1955 (aged 84) Uxbridge, Massachusetts, US
- Allegiance: United States
- Branch: United States Marine Corps
- Service years: 1896–1901
- Rank: Corporal
- Conflicts: Cienfuegos, Cuba
- Awards: Medal of Honor

Corporal Edward Sullivan of the United States Marine Corps was born May 16, 1870, in Cork, Ireland. He died March 11, 1955, at Uxbridge, Massachusetts. Uxbridge, Massachusetts has proud connections to the military history of America. Uniforms for the U.S. military were manufactured in Uxbridge for more than 100 years.

Sullivan was awarded the nation's top honor, the Medal of Honor, for heroism during the Spanish–American War of 1898.

== Biography ==
Edward Sullivan entered the United States Marine Corps from Massachusetts in 1896, and served in the Spanish–American War as a corporal in the United States Marine Corps.

He was awarded the Medal of Honor for heroism on May 11, 1898, at Cienfuegos, Cuba. His citation reads -

"On board the USS Marblehead during the operation of cutting the cable leading from Cienfuegos, Cuba, May 11, 1898. Facing the heavy fire of the enemy, Sullivan displayed extraordinary bravery and coolness throughout this action."

(Bio by: Don Morfe)

Here is an excerpt from Home of Heroes website:

Edward Sullivan was one of 52 sailors and Marines cited for bravery and coolness in the face of enemy fire during the cutting of cables at Cienfuegos, Cuba on May 11, 1898. The mission was a daring operation to cut undersea cables linking the Spanish fortifications at Cienfuegos with the rest of the world. Destruction of the cables was ordered to disrupt communications. In two boats, sailors from the USS Nashville (PG-7) and the USS Marblehead (C-11) were joined by a Marine guard as they moved within 15 feet of the enemy shore, under fire from the hidden enemy, to dredge up and cut two such cables. During the 80 minute operation, the cable cutting party was under constant enemy fire from a short range, while they coolly dredged the cables across the bow of their boats, then cut through them with hacksaws. When a cable was severed, the seaward end was transported back to the USS Marblehead, which then moved further from shore to drop the ends in deeper water and make repair impossible. So intense was the enemy presence, and so daring the American support, Captain Maynard of the Nashville was wounded in the action. With great courage, the mission was accomplished.

Corporal Sullivan died on March 11, 1955, at the age of 84 in Uxbridge, Massachusetts. He is buried in the Prospect Hill Cemetery in Uxbridge.

== See also ==
- List of Medal of Honor recipients
