= Samuel George Willard =

American politician

Samuel George Willard (November 8, 1819 – June 12, 1887) was an American Congregational minister and politician.

Willard, son of Dr. David and Abby (Gregory) Willard, was born in Wilton, Connecticut, on November 8, 1819. At the age of 15, owing to infirm health, he relinquished the intention of entering college, and after that spent nearly two and a half years in business and three years in school-teaching, before he again took up his preparatory studies.

He graduated from Yale College in 1846. After graduation he remained in New Haven for three years, engaged in teaching and in the study of divinity in the Yale Seminary. In September 1849, he received a call from the First (Congregational) Church in Willimantic, Connecticut, over which he was ordained pastor, on 8 November following. From this charge he was dismissed on September 8, 1868, to accept a call to the Congregational Church in the neighboring town of Colchester, with which he continued as pastor for another equal period of 19 years, until his death there on June 12, 1887, in his 68th year.

Willard was widely esteemed and trusted in his public vocation and by his brethren in the ministry. In the latter relation he was especially active in the management of the Missionary Society of Connecticut and of the Fund for Ministers, which he aided in establishing. He was also much interested in the care of the public schools in both the places of his pastoral labor. In 1866, he was a member of the Connecticut State Legislature and was elected by that body as one of the trustees for the General Hospital for the Insane of the State, chartered that year; he served in this capacity until his last illness, and for much of the time as Secretary of the Board. In 1867, he was elected into the Corporation of Yale College, and held this position until his death, being also for twelve years a member of the important Prudential Committee of that body. While in attendance at the meeting of the Corporation at Commencement, 1886, he suffered an apoplectic stroke, due probably to recent over work. He was taken home the next day, and rallied to some extent, but not sufficiently to perform any further work. His powers gradually failed, and he died on June 12, 1887, in his 68th year.

On November 14, 1849, he married Mary, daughter of Samuel P. Randle, of Wilton, who died very suddenly on May 15, 1853, leaving no children; he married in 1854 Cynthia B Witter, daughter of Dan Barrows, of Mansfield, Connecticut. Cynthia survived him with their only son and two daughters.
