= Bullard Machine Tool Company =

American company

A Bullard CNC VTL.

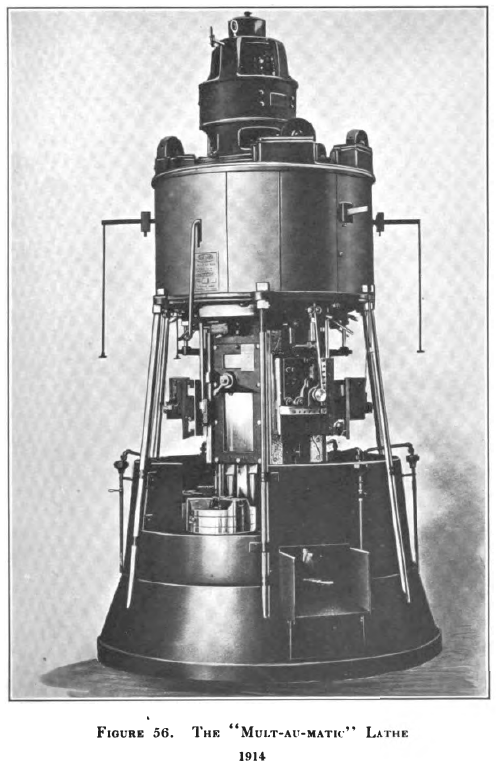
Bullard Mult-Au-Matic, a vertical, multispindle automatic lathe, 1914.

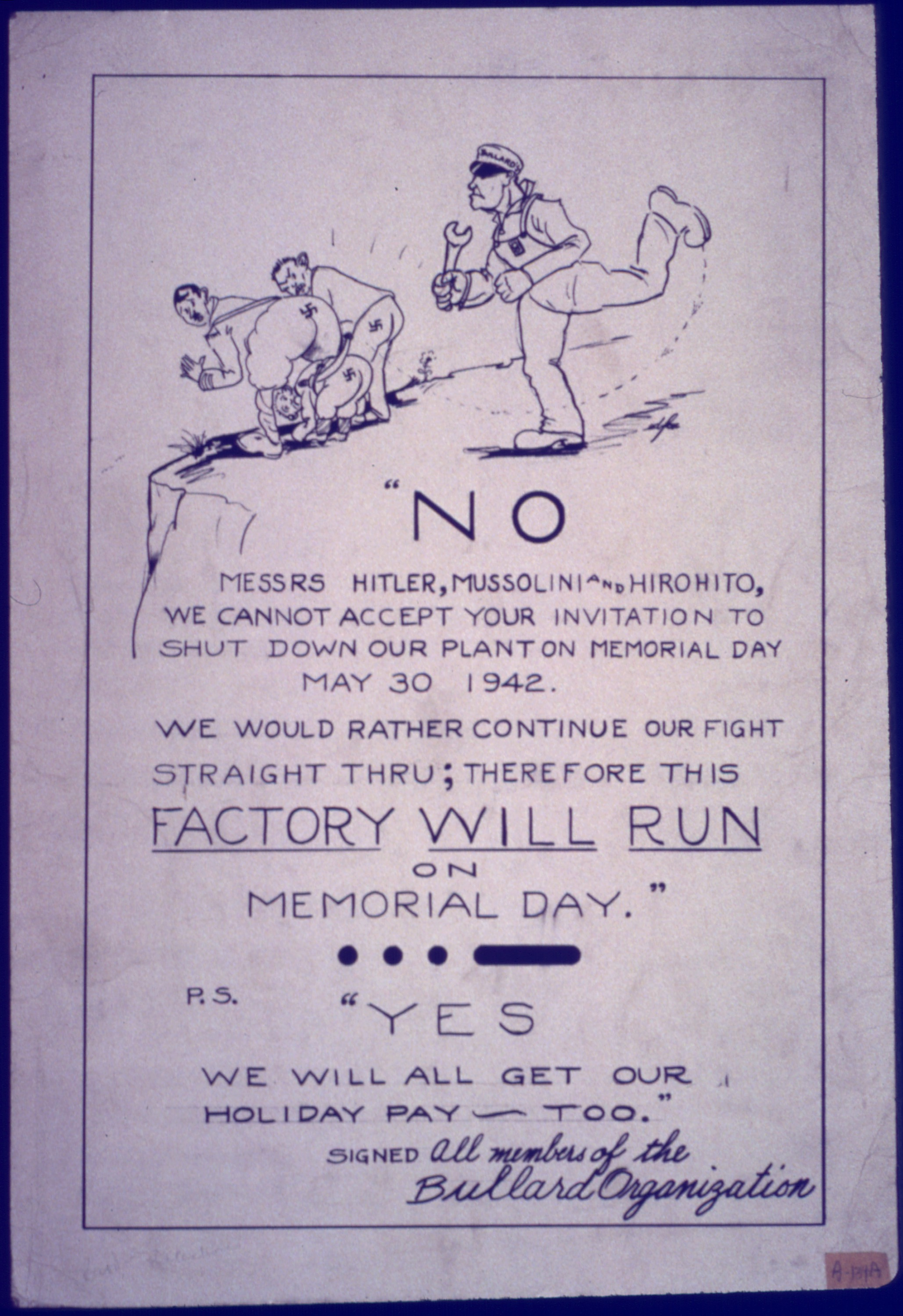
Memorial Day 1942 at Bullard

The Bullard Machine Tool Company was a large American machine tool builder. It specialized in vertical boring mills and was largely responsible for the development of the modern form of that class of machine tools.

== History ==
The firm was founded in 1894 by Edward Payson Bullard Sr. (born April 18, 1841, in Uxbridge, Massachusetts, US; died December 22, 1906, in Bridgeport, Connecticut, US). He received formative experience at Colt's Manufacturing Company and Pratt & Whitney Measurement Systems, which were influential development centers for generations of toolmakers. Bullard Sr is believed to have developed the first small boring machine designed to do the accurate work previously performed on the faceplate of a lathe. Roe (1916) says that "Up to that time boring machines were relied on only for large and rough work."

Bullard Sr.'s son, Edward Payson Bullard Jr. (1872–1953), continued the family machine tool business and brought the turret principle to the vertical boring mill, making it a vertical turret lathe. For a while in America during the 20th century, the name "Bullard" on the shop floor was something of a genericized trademark for vertical turret-head boring mills. E.P. Bullard Jr led the development of the company's multiple-spindle Mult-Au-Matic brand machine that became an important automatic lathe in the mass production of parts for the automotive industry. Bullard Jr was president of the company for 40 years, through World War I, the interwar period, and World War II, a period during which the Bullard company was the largest machine tool builder in the U.S., and vast volumes of military matériel were produced by countless companies running Bullard machines. Bullard is now owned by Bourn & Koch, based in Rockford, Illinois. Bourn & Koch continues to provide OEM parts, service and support for their machines. In 1942, Bullard Company machine tools were the subject of a wartime film, "We Sail at Midnight," produced by the British ministries of supply and wartime transport.

== See also ==
- Cincinnati Milling Machine Company

== Bibliography ==
- Burghardt, Henry D.; Axelrod, Aaron; Anderson, James (1959), Machine Tool Operation, vol. 1 (5th ed.), New York: McGraw-Hill, OCLC 964718.
- American Precision Museum (1982), "Edward P. Bullard (1872-1953)", Machine Tool Hall of Fame, American Precision Museum, archived from the original on 2016-11-12
- Day, Lance; McNeil, Ian, eds. (1996), Biographical Dictionary of the History of Technology, New York: Routledge, ISBN 0-415-06042-7, LCCN 95026250
- Roe, Joseph Wickham (1916), English and American Tool Builders, New Haven, Connecticut: Yale University Press, LCCN 16011753. Reprinted by McGraw-Hill, New York and London, 1926 (LCCN 27-24075); and by Lindsay Publications, Inc., Bradley, Illinois (ISBN 978-0-917914-73-7).
