= Leonard White (physician) =

American physician

Leonard D. White
- Born: September 7, 1856; Douglas, Massachusetts, United States
- Died: September 18, 1906 (aged 50); Uxbridge, Massachusetts, USA
- Education: Golf and Mowry School, tutored by JM Macomber MD of Uxbridge Academy; Harvard Medical School;
- Occupation(s): Physician, Health Officer, Chair of Uxbridge Board of Health,
- Known for: involved with first efforts for malaria prevention; published early cases of fatal illness following vaccine
- Parent(s): David P. White, and Clarissa (Darling) White of Douglas

Leonard D. White, M.D. (1856-1906) was a late 19th-century physician and one of the Health Officers in Massachusetts who was involved with the earliest study of mosquitoes and malaria and efforts for community prevention of malaria. He served as chairman of the Board of Health in Uxbridge.

== Biography ==
He was born September 7, 1856, in Douglas, Massachusetts. He was the son of Dr. David P. and Clarissa Darlin.

He attended the Mowry and Goff School and was tutored by Joshua Mason Macomber of the Uxbridge Academy. He completed his education at Harvard Medical School. He practiced as a generalist, a country doctor, in Uxbridge Massachusetts.

He married Lillian Belle Brown on July 20, 1882. They had one child, Charles W. born on March 18, 1886.

He died on September 18, 1906, of heart disease.

== Significance of Career and Public Health History ==
Dr. Leonard White published two reports of early childhood vaccine related deaths, (1885). The description of the deaths of these two children, vaccinated two weeks earlier by an unknown practitioner is nothing less than tragic. The time period was consistent with smallpox vaccination. Tetanus toxoid would come into use, just a short time later in 1887. In 1896, Theobald Smith, state Board of Health pathologist, wrote the now local health officer at Uxbridge, Dr. White, who had published a written report to the state board of health on a local malaria outbreak Smith warned White of mosquito connections to malaria, later proven in 1897, by Ronald Ross, in India. He recommended that Dr. White ask his boy to attempt to trap some of the mosquitoes in Uxbridge, in boxes with pinholes, for further study, and take precautions with screens on the windows of buildings, drainage of collections of water, etc. Indeed, there were some swampy lands near Uxbridge along the Blackstone River, the Mumford River and West River. This was believed to be the first attempt at "prevention" for malaria. In 1905, the state board of health, ordered the town to move its water supply, due to contamination from the polluted river.

Here is the letter that Dr. Theobald Smith wrote to Dr. White as "health officer" at Uxbridge. In 1889 and 1893, Dr. Theobald Smith made discoveries which implicated cattle ticks as the necessary developmental host of the causal agent of Texas cattle fever. The question of what caused malaria and how it was transmitted did not escape his attention. In 1896, he wrote this letter to one Dr. White of Uxbridge, Massachusetts which was in the midst of a malaria outbreak.

June 30, 1896 Dear Doctor:

Your published letter has been received and read with much interest. I think that you state the situation as clearly as it can be made out at the present time. I wish to state in a few words what I am at present considering as a working hypothesis but I do not care to have it published or discussed at present as I have no evidence to back it up. I simply make the suggestions for your own use as Health Officer.

I believe that the malarial germ is caused by mosquitoes, not all mosquitoes to be sure but only those in infected localities. Anything that favors the breeding of these pests like stagnant ponds, pools, sewers, etc. would favor it.

I wish that your boy would catch for me some of the Uxbridge mosquitoes and send them to me alive in a box with pinholes in them. I wish to compare them with those in this non-infected neighborhood.

In your work of suppression, I would suggest that you keep your mind on these insects. Devise protection by window screens, in-door (illegible) abandonment of barrels, tubs, etc. about the house that contain water in which they breed abundantly.

However this hypothesis will be found true I do not at present know. The State Board is not prepared to make any public statement so I wish you to keep the letter as a confidential matter.

I regret that my work here does not permit me to spend (more or some) time at Uxbridge.

But if you keep me informed I can make suggestions from here. I also wish that you would continue to send me (preparations) when opportunity offers.

Very truly yours,

Theobald Smith

== Afterwards ==
Dr. Leonard White's house was in Uxbridge, on Douglas Street, next to where Snowling Rd is located today. White was an example of a 19th-century physician, a country doctor, who published, and who served as a local health officer, under the Massachusetts State Board of Health. His contributions were significant in the history of medicine and public health. He was a contemporary of Walter Reed, who contributed in 1885 to the same publication in which Dr. White's case reports of childhood vaccine related deaths appeared. Walter Reed unlocked answers to Yellow fever in the late 19th century. The first notion of a connection of mosquitoes transmitting diseases was from a Cuban physician, Carlos Finlay in 1881 relating to Finlay's work with Yellow fever, later confirmed specifically for malaria by Ronald Ross in India c. 1898. Malaria is a protozoan disease carried by aedes aegypti mosquitoes, as a "vector".

Another Harvard Medical School graduate, and contemporary of Dr. White would become renowned for public health work in Providence during the same period, Charles V. Chapin. Chapin was Superintendent of public health in Providence, just 20 miles away. His contributions extended to infection control practices that remain in use to this day. They were both born in 1856, and likely crossed paths at Harvard medical school and beyond.

== Reference with local photos ==
1. Wrona, B. Mae., Uxbridge, Images of America; 2000; Arcadia Publishing Company; ISBN 0-7385-0461-0
