= Harold Walter =

American textile manufacturer

Harold J. Walter
- Born: 1901; Colorado, United States
- Died: 1962 (aged 60–61); Uxbridge, Massachusetts, United States
- Education: University of Colorado Boulder
- Occupation: Textile manufacturer

Harold J. Walter, who was born in Colorado 1901 and died in 1962 in Uxbridge, Massachusetts, was an American textile manufacturer.

== Early life and education ==
Harold John Walter was born and raised in Colorado. He grew up in Colorado and graduated from the University of Colorado in 1923, at the age of 21. He went to work in the textile industry and rose to become a well known industrialist and entrepreneur, known for research in the manufacturing of textiles. He rose to be the CEO of the Bachman Uxbridge Worsted Company, headquartered in Uxbridge, Massachusetts.

== Significance as an industrialist ==
Walter modestly credited his success in an article in Time magazine to "marrying the boss's daughter". Charles Arthur Root, a local industrialized who had founded the Bachman Uxbridge Worsted Company was his father-in-law. Harold later became the president of the Bachman Uxbridge Worsted Company. At its peak it was one of the most successful textile companies in America. The company had thirteen plants nationwide, with 6000 workers, in four states, and was written up in Time in August 1953 in an article entitled "The Pride of Uxbridge". The Bachman Uxbridge Worsted company was a pioneer in blending synthetics with wool. The company boasted 75% percent increases in productivity with a variety of processes including air conditioned plants. Their proprietary processes produced material that led the U.S. in women's wear in the 1950s. The company had a long history of producing military uniforms, and produced the dress uniforms for the U.S. Army and "the first U.S. Air Force Uniform". They developed highly productive processes for making yarn. See also the articles on Colonel John Capron, Bernat Mill, and Uxbridge, Massachusetts.

== Time magazine and uniforms ==
The mill was featured in the August 24, 1953, edition of Time magazine, in an article entitled, "The Pride of Uxbridge" as the site of the Bachman Uxbridge Worsted Company, which was then one of the most successful textile mills in New England. Research into textiles at Bachman Uxbridge Worsted Company produced a range of blended fabrics, including the "wool-nylon serge" used for army uniforms. The original U.S. Air Force uniform produced at the factory was dubbed and patented "Uxbridge Blue" or "Uxbridge 1683", after blue dye color selected at Bachman Uxbridge. This dye was used in the manufacture of uniforms from 1947.

== Notes ==
- "The Pride of Uxbridge (August 24, 1953)". Time. August 24, 1953. Archived from the original on December 22, 2008.
- "Getting the Blues, by Tech. Sgt. Pat McKenna". Air Force Link. Archived from the original on February 2, 2007.
