= Ironstone, Massachusetts =

Ironstone South Uxbridge
- Village
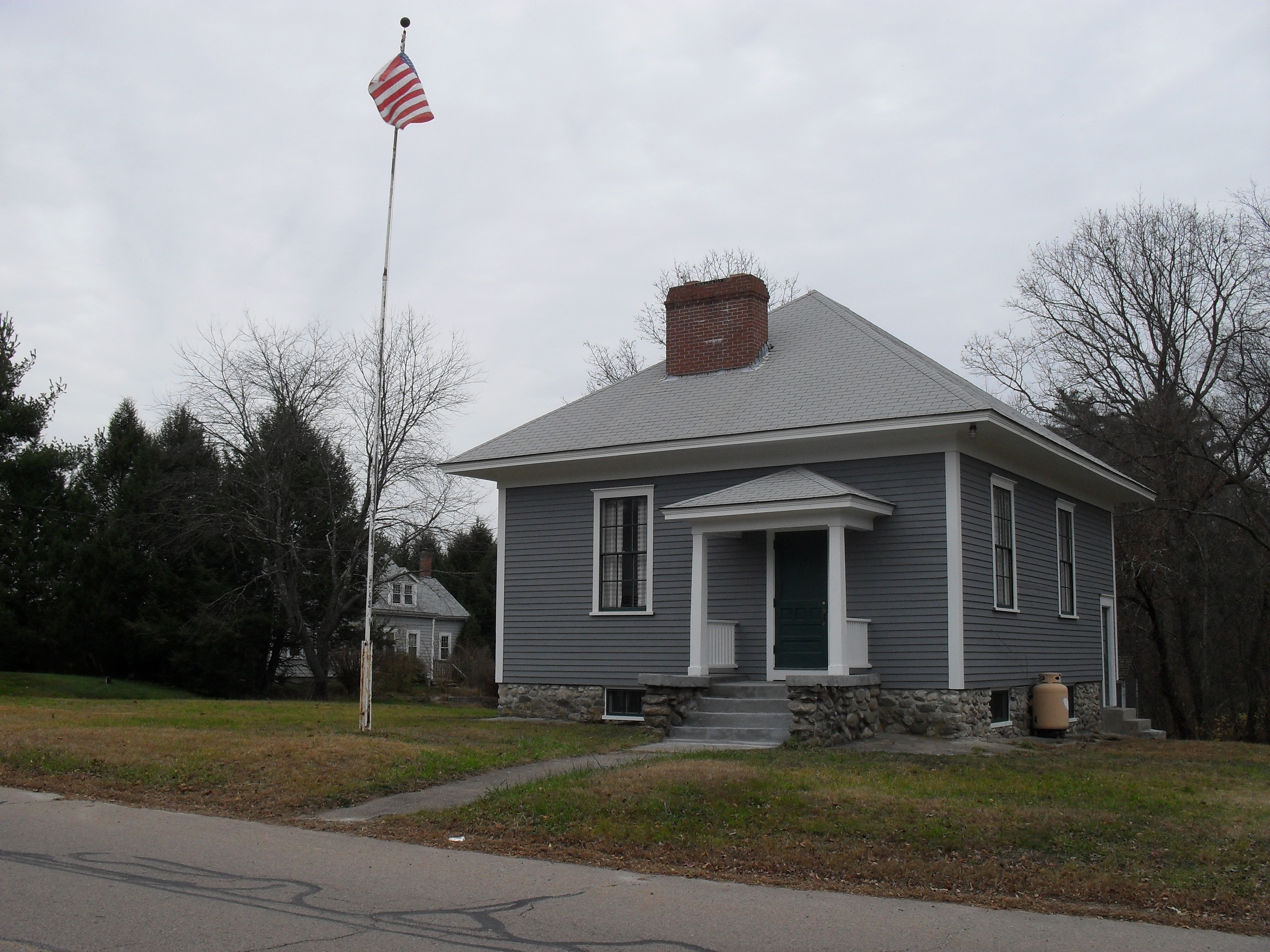
- South Uxbridge Community Association, Ironstone School

- Location within the state of Massachusetts
- Coordinates: 42°01′42″N 71°36′38″W
- Country: United States
- State: Massachusetts
- County: Worcester
- Elevation: 243 ft (74 m)
- Time zone: UTC-5 (Eastern (EST))
  - Summer (DST): UTC-4 (EDT)
- ZIP codes: 01569
- GNIS feature ID: 611544
- Ironstone Mill Housing and Cellar Hole
- U.S. National Register of Historic Places
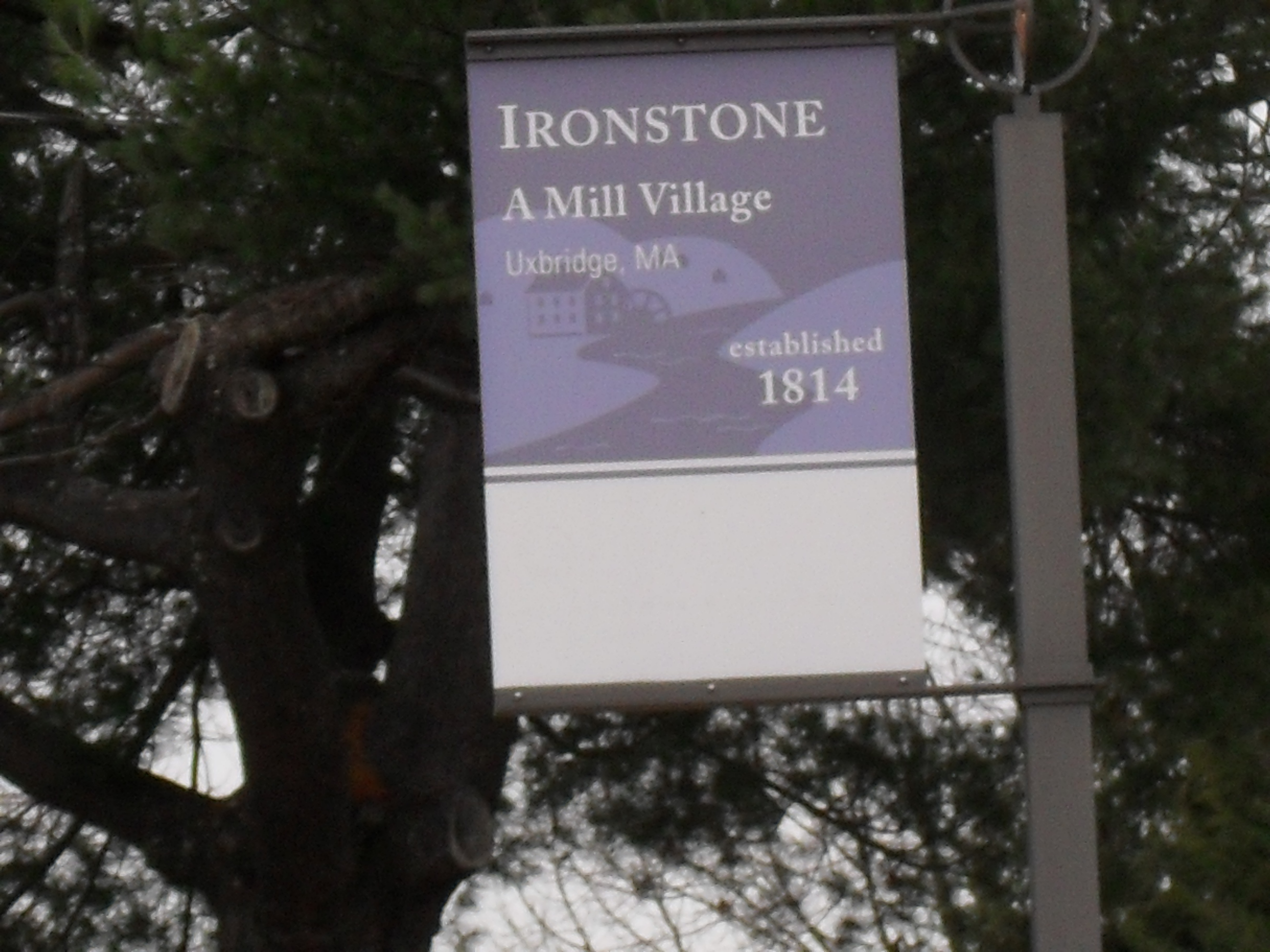
- Ironstone, A mill village from 1814
- Location: 136 Ironstone Street, off Massachusetts Route 146A; Uxbridge, Massachusetts
- Built: 1814
- NRHP reference No.: 83004124
- Added to NRHP: October 7, 1983

Ironstone is a historic village, today known mainly as South Uxbridge, in the township of Uxbridge, Massachusetts, United States. It derived its name from plentiful bog iron found here which helped Uxbridge to become a center for three iron forges in the town's earliest settlement. South Uxbridge has historic sites, picturesque weddings, hospitality, industrial and distribution centers, and the new Uxbridge High School. This community borders North Smithfield, and Burrillville, Rhode Island, and Millville, Massachusetts. South Uxbridge receives municipal services from Uxbridge, for fire, police, EMS, School district, public works, and other services. There is a South Uxbridge fire station of the Uxbridge fire department. Worcester's Judicial District includes Uxbridge District Court. Ironstone appears on the Blackstone U.S. Geological Survey Map. Worcester County is in the Eastern time zone (GMT -5) and observes DST.

== Ironstone Mill Housing and Cellar Hole Historic Site ==
In the early beginnings of America's industrial revolution, a mill, mill village and housing developed at Ironstone significant to the textile industry of Uxbridge, Massachusetts. A national historic site marks the Ironstone Mill and Cellar Hole, one of several examples of Mill worker housing and a mill village in the upper Blackstone Valley. The site, at 136 Ironstone Street, is just north of exit 1 on Massachusetts Route 146, the principal limited access highway between Worcester, and Providence, Rhode Island, also located off Massachusetts Route 146A, the Lydia Taft Highway. For a complete listing of the National Historic Register listings in Uxbridge, see the link below. The original Mill, built in 1814 by William Arnold, later burned and was rebuilt by David and Seth Southwick in the 1850s. It burned again, and all that remains is the cellar hole. Historic photos remain and are published in a book "Uxbridge, Images of America", by Mae Edwards Wrona, published in 2000, by Arcadia, Tempus Publishing Inc, p56. The mill is a forerunner of America's Industrial Revolution which began here in the Blackstone Valley in 1793 with Samuel Slater and his mill, at Pawtucket, Rhode Island. Pawtucket is about 17 miles (27 km) to the SE of Ironstone. Slatersville, Rhode Island, the next community south of Ironstone, was established by Samuel Slater and his brother John Slater (industrialist) in 1806, and became the template for mill villages throughout the Blackstone Valley later known as The Rhode Island System.

== Photos ==
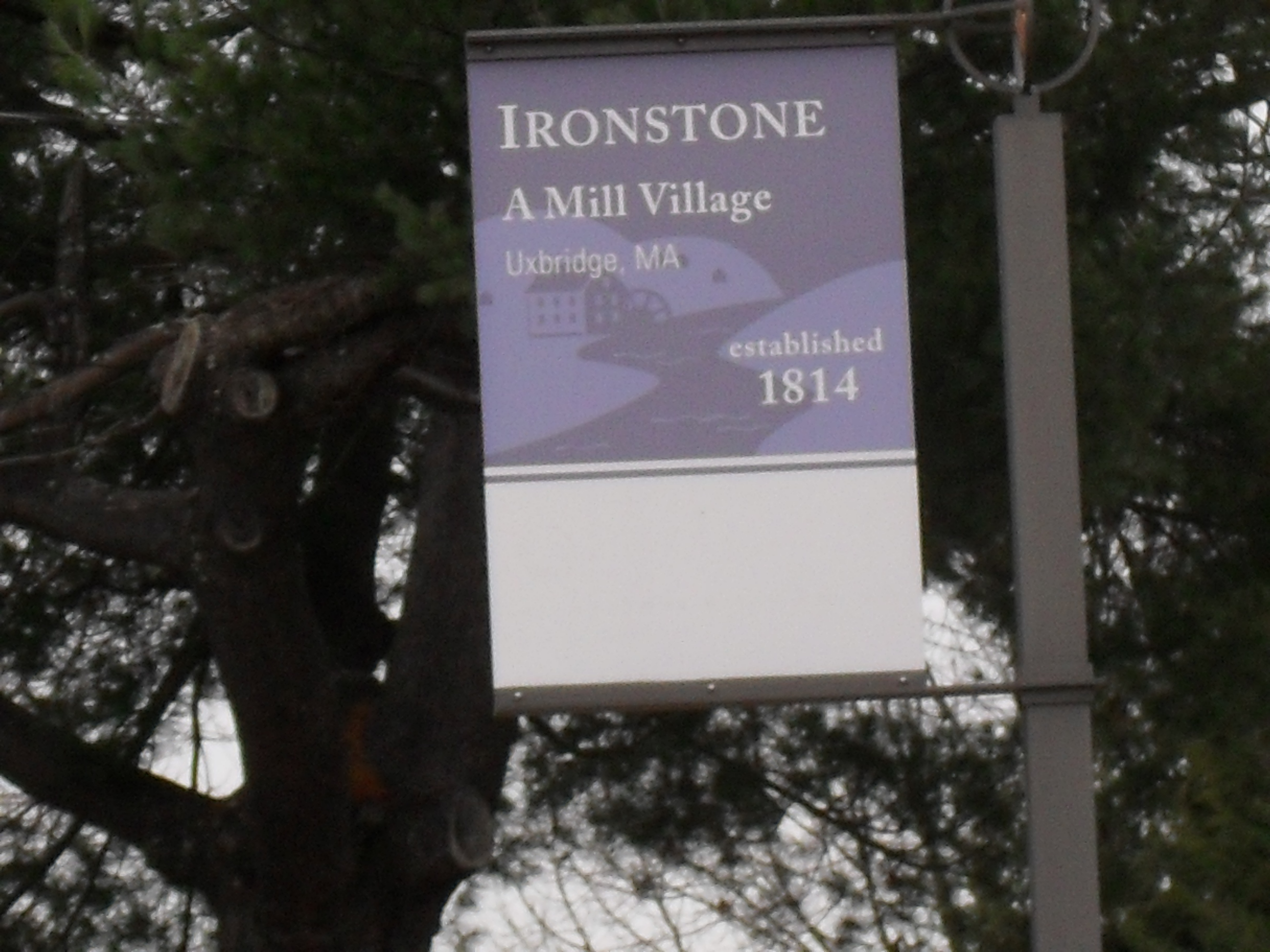
Ironstone, A mill village from 1814

Mill worker housing, Ironstone Cotton Manufacturing Company, built 1814

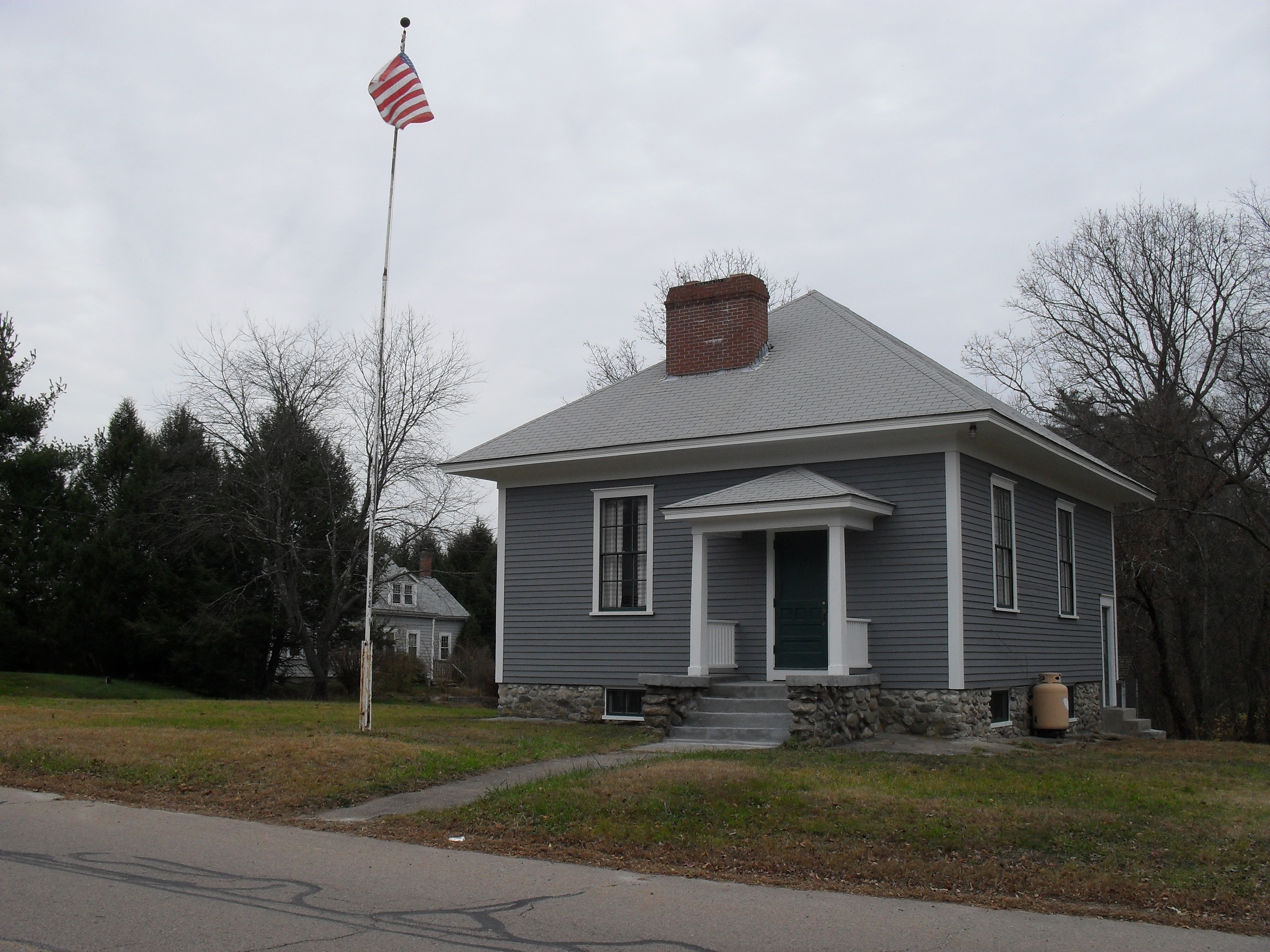
Former one room Ironstone school, now maintained by South Uxbridge Community Association

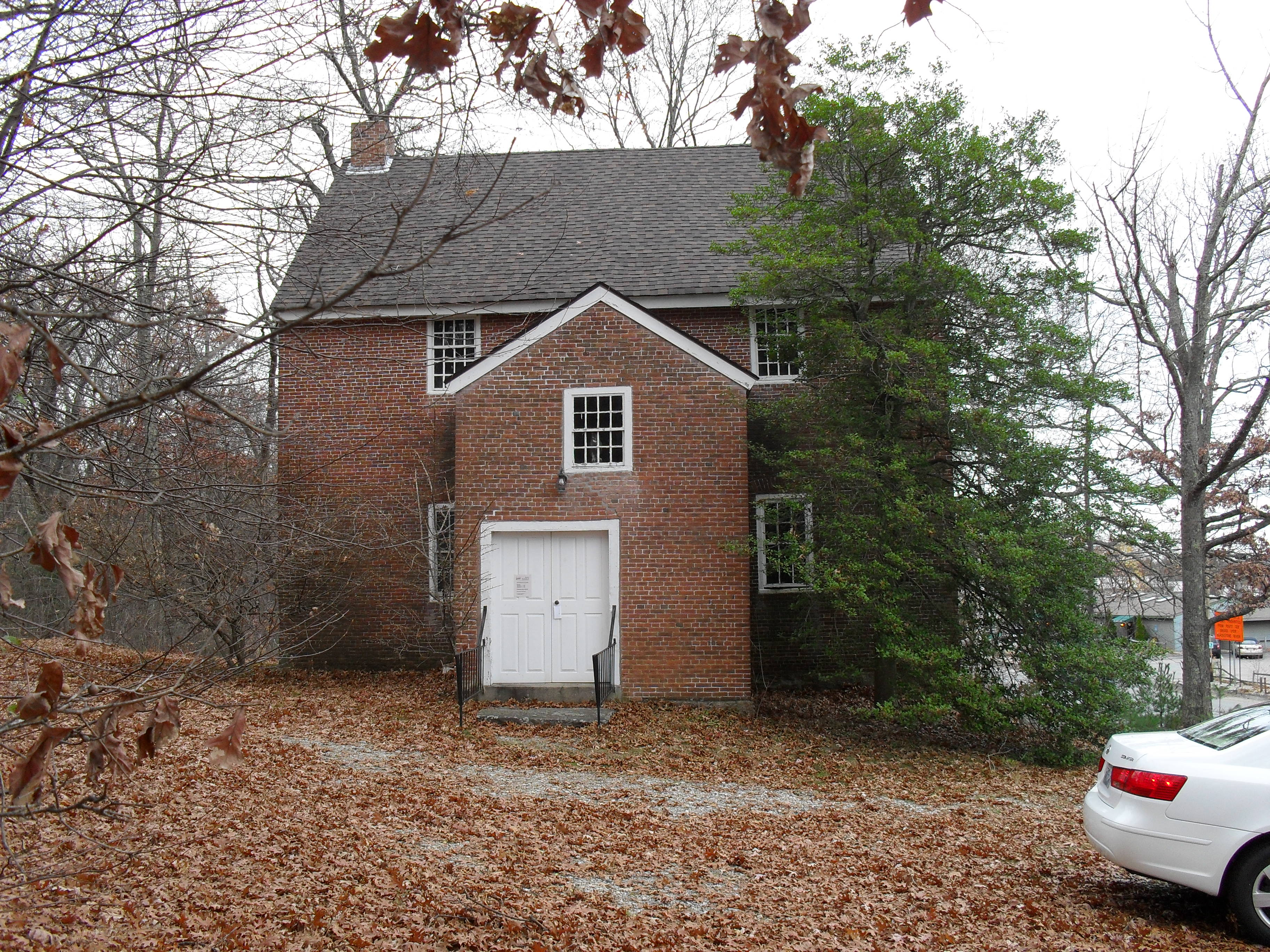
Friends Meeting House (1770), Quaker Highway at Route 98,

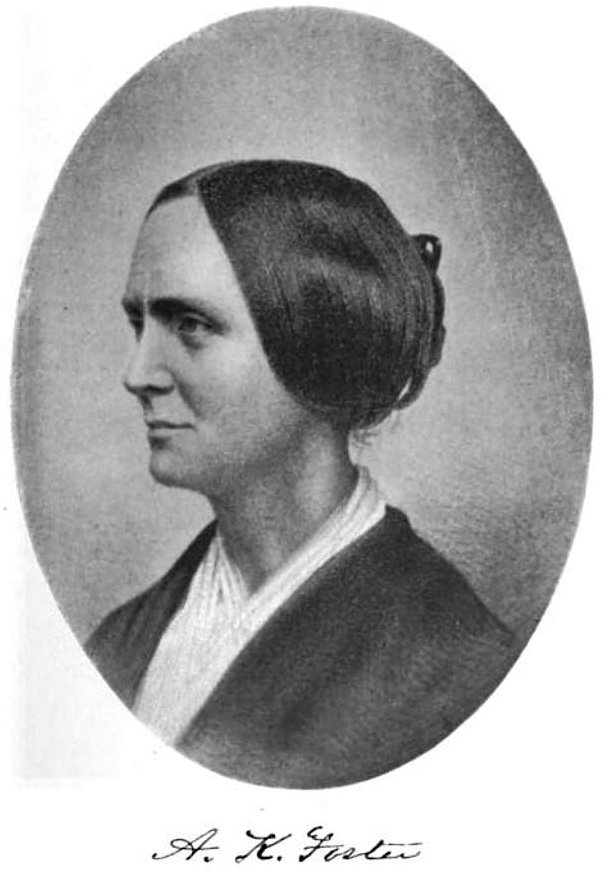
Abby Kelley Foster, of Friend's Meeting House, led Susan B. Anthony to abolitionism

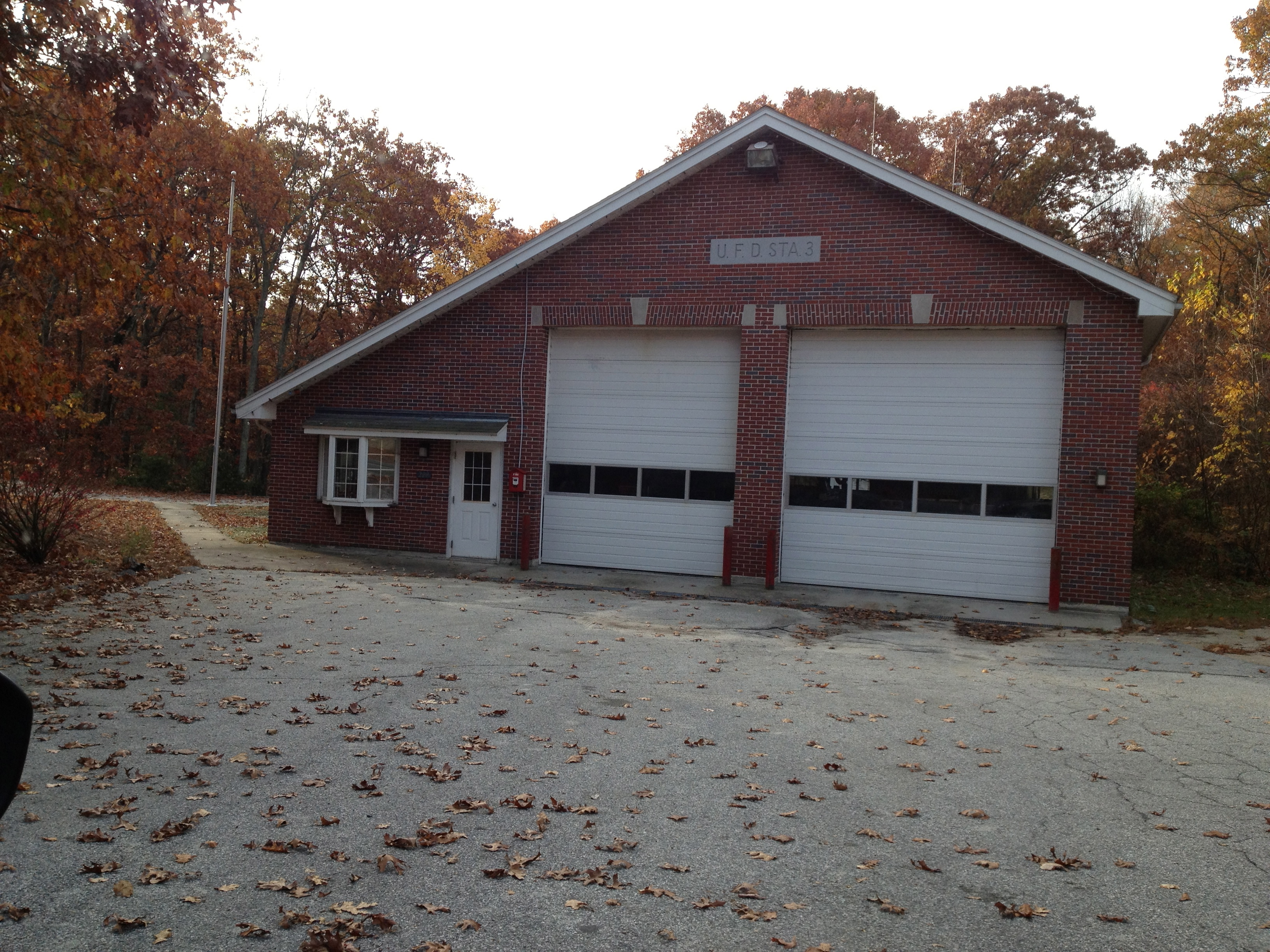
South Uxbridge Station No. 3 of the Uxbridge Fire Department, located on Route 98 (Massachusetts), Aldrich Street, South of Quaker City and at the Aldrich Village.

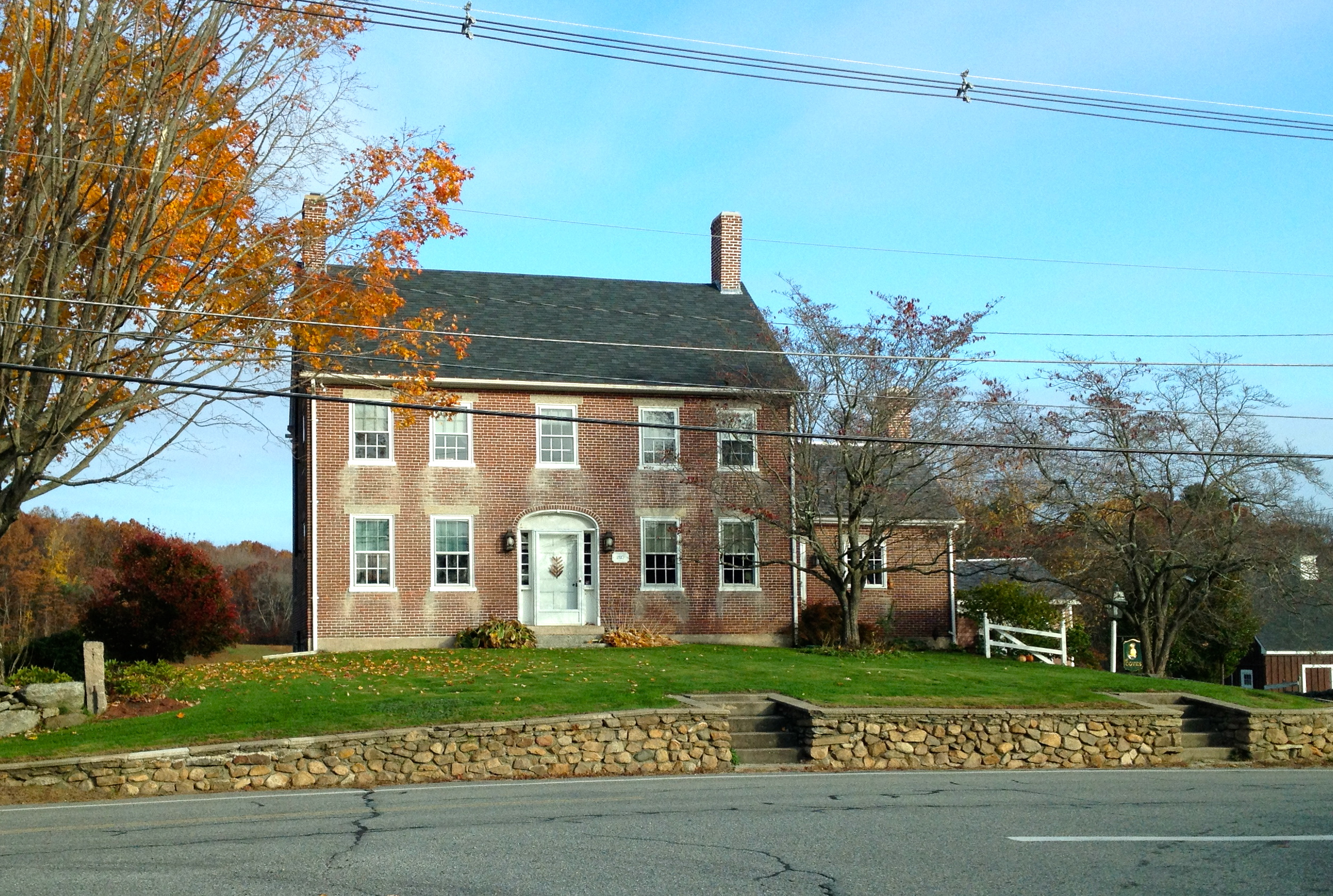
Jacob Aldrich House is a national Historic register site which typifies early Quaker houses at Quaker City and South Uxbridge, Located on Massachusetts Route 98, Aldrich St

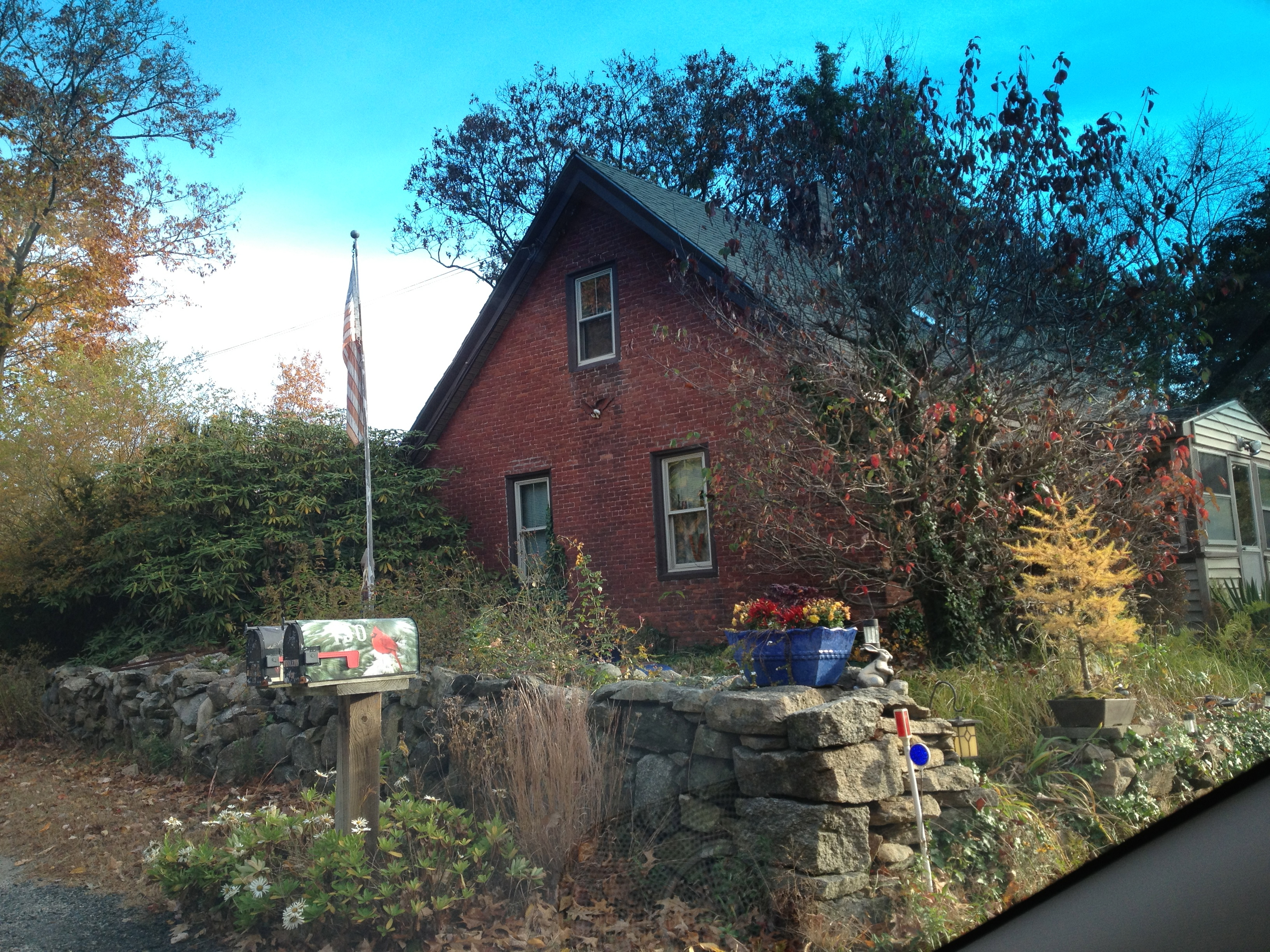
Daniel Aldrich Cottage and sawmill, Aldrich Street, Route 98, S. Uxbridge.

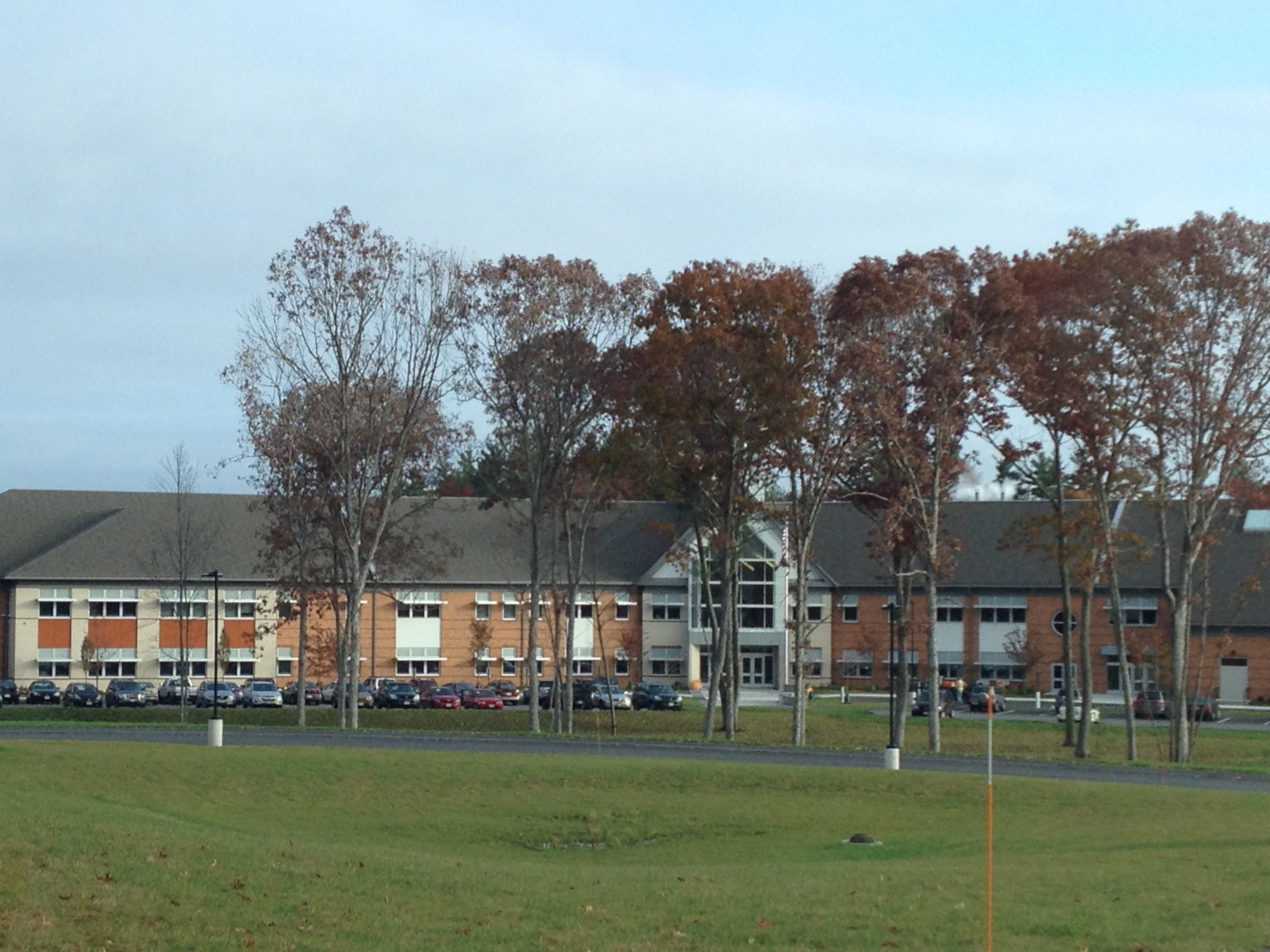
Uxbridge High School, Quaker Highway, Uxbridge, MA, built 2012.

== Ironstone mill housing and history ==
The Ironstone mill housing at 135 Ironstone Street was built by the Ironstone Cotton Manufacturing Company which produced cotton yarns. William Arnold built this mill in 1814 to make yarn from raw cotton which was then woven into fabric by area families operating as cottage industries. Around 1820, Arnold added this housing when he increased the factory production by increasing water power and installing power looms. The earliest power looms in America included those used in Uxbridge. Due to goods needing transport, Ironstone became an important stopover for various transportation carriers - the stagecoach and the train. A post office and store were quickly established on the mill property. In the 1850s this mill under management by Seth and Daniel Southwick, made denim fabric for Kentucky Blue Jeans. In the 1870s, David Southwick created Conestoga wagon wheels in his blacksmith shop in nearby south Uxbridge and Ironstone, which were used by pioneers traveling west. The mill, was finally lost after it burnt down in 1875 after two earlier fires had led to rebuilding the mill.

== History of Ironstone Village and the area ==
The village of Ironstone was one of the first settlements of Uxbridge, in the early 1730s. In 1734, Benjamin Taft, a member of the American Taft family, started an early iron forge, bog iron mine here, and later Caleb Handy added a triphammer operation for making tools, guns and scythes at this site. The Blackstone Valley Daily describes the influence that Ironstone had in the life of this community. 'The Ironstone School' is an historic building that was used as recently as 1948 as a traditional one room schoolhouse. The original building dated from 1797 and had eight grades and one teacher. Ironstone was influential in Uxbridge's transformation from agriculture to manufacturing. The Boston, Hartford and Erie Railroad served the Ironstone area in the 1860s for shipping goods to the markets west and east. Captain James Buxton (1745–1817), served in the 11th Massachusetts Regiment (American Revolution) at Valley Forge and Saratoga, lived in the border area in the 18th century, in what is North Smithfield, Rhode Island at the Uxbridge line. Buxton Street in South Uxbridge, and the Captain James Buxton (Uxbridge) fife and drum corps, are both named for him. Buxton's commission as Captain was signed by John Hancock, and he was given 300 acres (120 ha) of land in Worcester County, Massachusetts, in Uxbridge for service in the American Revolution. He died of paralysis in 1817 and is buried in his family's cemetery just off route 146A. Richard Mowry, a Quaker from Quaker City, adjacent to and just north of Ironstone, developed some of the first machines for manufacturing textiles in America, around the time of the American Revolution. A nearby small lake, Ironstone pond, extends into Burrillville, Rhode Island. The northernmost Rhode Island road in Burrillville is "Ironstone Road".

== Other features and historic sites ==
There is a one-room schoolhouse here which is now a historic building, and is known as the Ironstone School. Today it is the home of the South Uxbridge Community Association. Ironstone and South Uxbridge are part of the Blackstone River Valley National Heritage Corridor of the National Park Service. The Blackstone Valley is the oldest industrialized region of the United States. The Ironstone section of the Town of Uxbridge has other alternate names and dispersed villages which include: Chockalog, south Uxbridge, Albee, Scadden and historically included Quaker City, and Aldrich village. Aldrich village was the original home base to the Aldrich family, the Aldrich family cemetery, and the origins of an American family dynasty that included Senator Nelson Aldrich of Rhode Island, and his son in law, Vice President Nelson Aldrich Rockefeller.

Nearby is a historic "Friends Meetinghouse" (see also listed below). Abby Kelley Foster, a notable American abolitionist, belonged to Friends Meetinghouse. She and fellow local Quaker Effingham Capron, another national anti-slavery leader, worked with the Underground Railroad at Ironstone, and in the Blackstone Valley and liberated many slaves. With the relocation of Route 146 in 1984, a unique historic find emerged from a local cemetery in the Ironstone area near the state border. An almshouse cemetery nearby was relocated with the Route 146 construction between 1981–1984 and resulted in historic archeology findings published by Boston University researchers. The findings revealed complex religious mortuary practices used for the poor during the "Second Great Awakening."

The Second Great Awakening resulted in social reform in America including the Abolition movement, prison reforms and other social reforms. Abby Kelley Foster, the Quakers, and, Rev. Willard Preston, D.D. had prominent roles in the Second Great Awakening, and roles at or near Ironstone, in Providence, Worcester, and Uxbridge. Abby Kelley led Susan B. Anthony to abolitionism. Preston served in Uxbridge, and as President of the University of Vermont, and became a well-known preacher at Savannah, GA just prior to the American Civil War with published sermons at the Independent Presbyterian Church of Savannah.

== See also ==
- National Register of Historic Places listings in Uxbridge, Massachusetts
- Friends Meetinghouse (Uxbridge, Massachusetts)
- Blackstone River Valley National Heritage Corridor
- List of mill towns in Massachusetts
