= Willard Preston =

President of the University of Vermont (1785–1856)

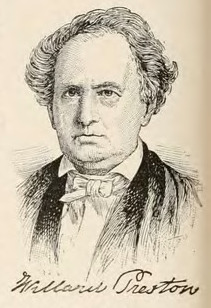

President of the University of Vermont
- In office 1825–1826

Personal details
- Born: May 29, 1785 Uxbridge, Massachusetts
- Died: April 26, 1856 (aged 70) Savannah, Georgia
- Education: Brown University
- Occupation: Clergyman, educator

Willard Preston (1785–1856) was the fourth president of the University of Vermont, and was awarded the honorary degree of Doctor of Divinity by the University of Georgia after 25 years of service to the Independent Presbyterian Church of Savannah.

== Early life ==
Preston was born in Uxbridge, Massachusetts, on May 29, 1785. He was educated in Uxbridge. He graduated from Brown University in 1806 and served churches at Uxbridge, in Rhode Island, and Vermont.

== Academics ==
In 1825, he became the fourth president of the University of Vermont (UVM). During his tenure, the Marquis de Layfayette laid the cornerstone of the south College of UVM. He pastored the well known Independent Presbyterian Church of Savannah, Georgia, for over 25 years. He received an honorary DD from the University of Georgia, prior to his death in 1856. Preston had several bound volumes of published sermons and is perhaps best known for a farewell sermon at St. Albans, Vermont, and a sermon during a period of national fasting and mourning on the death of President Harrison in 1841.

Preston died at his home in Savannah, Georgia, on April 26, 1856.
