= Samuel Willard (physician) =

American physician (1748–1801)

- Born: April 13, 1748; Lancaster, Massachusetts, British America
- Died: March 7, 1801 (aged 52); Worcester, Massachusetts, United States
- Education: Harvard University, Medical
- Occupations: Physician, Military Service in American Revolution, Early psychiatry; Constitutional Convention
- Known for: early mental health efforts and treating smallpox victims; served in Shays' Rebellion; constitutional convention
- Spouse: Olive Frost
- Parent(s): Nahum Willard, and his spouse,

Samuel Willard (April 13, 1748 – March 7, 1801) was an American physician who established the first hospital for mental illness in the United States.

== Early life and career ==
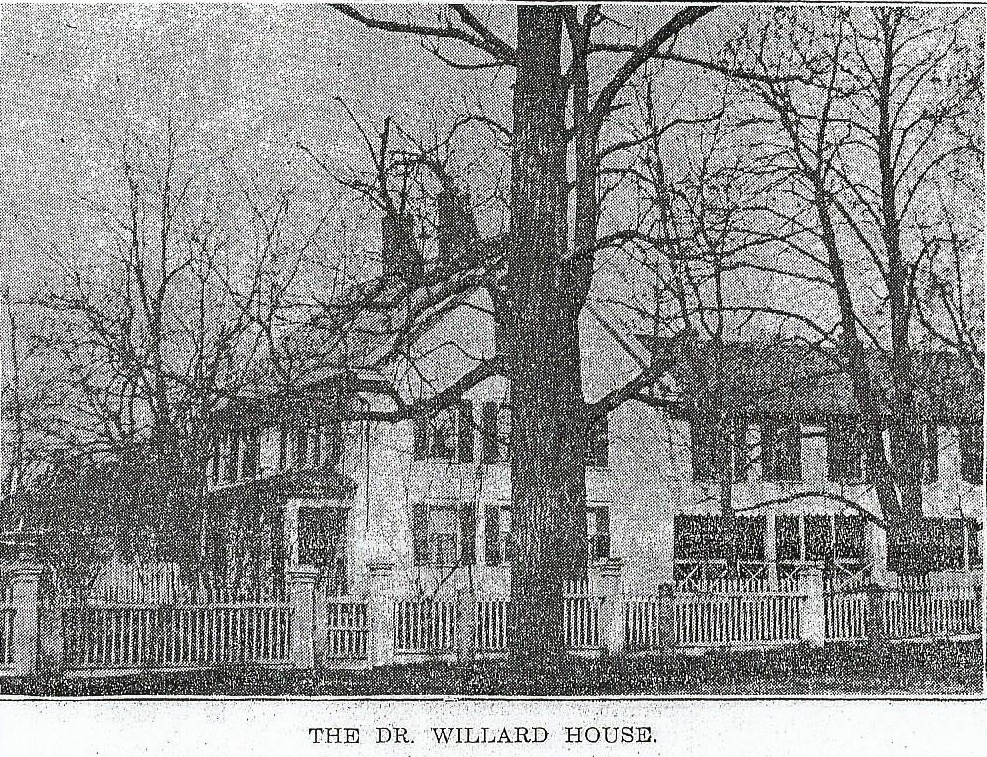
Dr. Samuel Willard House and Insane Asylum, established circa 1770

Samuel Willard, the son of Dr. Nahum Willard of Lancaster, Massachusetts, and a descendant of the famous Major Simon Willard of 17th-century Massachusetts, graduated from Harvard University in 1767. He studied medicine under Dr. Israel Atherton of Lancaster, Massachusetts, setting up practice as a physician in the town of Uxbridge in 1770. As a physician in Uxbridge, Willard was particularly distinguished for his treatment of the insane, establishing an "insane asylum" that he ran at Uxbridge. Known for his "eccentricities", it was reported that he dunked his mentally ill patients in local ponds. It appears that he was one of the earliest physicians to undertake the treatment of behavioral health problems with immersion in cold water. Dr. Willard's father, Nahum, was a Worcester Loyalist at the beginning of the Revolutionary War. Nahum was later forced to recant and then moved to Uxbridge. Both Samuel and his father drew the suspicions of Uxbridge officials who were concerned about possible Tories in their midst. Samuel proved his loyalties by serving as the Surgeon for the 2nd Worcester County Regiment of Foot (soldiers)when they marched to defend Tiverton, Rhode Island. Dr Willard, along with Reverend Hezekiah Chapman, were leaders of the Worcester County Convention that provided the justification of Daniel Shays' Rebellion. Both Willard and Chapman were listed as fugitives during the conflict but were not known to have been combatants. Willard spent that time in Smithfield, Rhode Island, where attempts to arrest him by the Worcester County sheriff were rebuffed by the local Justices of the Peace. Dr. Samuel Willard of Uxbridge is not to be confused with Rev. Samuel Willard, the minister of Third (Old South) Church in Boston (perhaps originally from Concord, Massachusetts), who opposed the 1692 witchcraft trials. He is also not to be confused with the later Dr. Samuel Willard, a Civil War-era surgeon from Lunenburg, Vermont, who died in Chicago.

Willard also served as the first postmaster in Uxbridge.

== Smallpox ==
In 1775, while Dr. Willard was in Uxbridge, the open town meeting voted to outlaw smallpox inoculation, sometimes also referred to as "variolation". This original practice for preventing the epidemic spread of smallpox, (introducing smallpox matter into the system through a scratch in the skin, thus arousing the growth of protective antibodies) preceded the English Sir William Jenner's work in developing the Vaccinia or cowpox vaccines for smallpox (1796), introduced to America a few years later by Benjamin Waterhouse. (The word "vaccine" itself comes from the Latin root for the word for cow, from cowpox, vaca.) Dr. Willard spent a good part of his career battling this disease in his rounds as a country doctor in 18th century Uxbridge, with rounds extending into Glocester, RI, present day Burrillville. He treated many cases of smallpox in Uxbridge and Burrillville, and was described as having smallpox scars on his arms.

== Significance in U.S. history ==
Dr. Willard ran the first hospital for mental illness in the USA pictured above. Willard was also chosen to represent Uxbridge to the Massachusetts ratification of the U.S. Constitution on December 13, 1787. He removed to Worcester, and died on March 7, 1801, according to the first reference, at the age of 52. Another reference has him dying at age 63, on Sept. 11, 1811 according to Judge Henry Chapin and on Sept. 9th, 1811 in the Uxbridge Vital Records.
