= Simeon Wheelock =

Lt. Simeon Wheelock
- Born: March 29, 1741; Mendon, Massachusetts
- Died: January 26, 1787; Springfield, Massachusetts
- Occupations: blacksmith, Massachusetts militiaman, Lieutenant

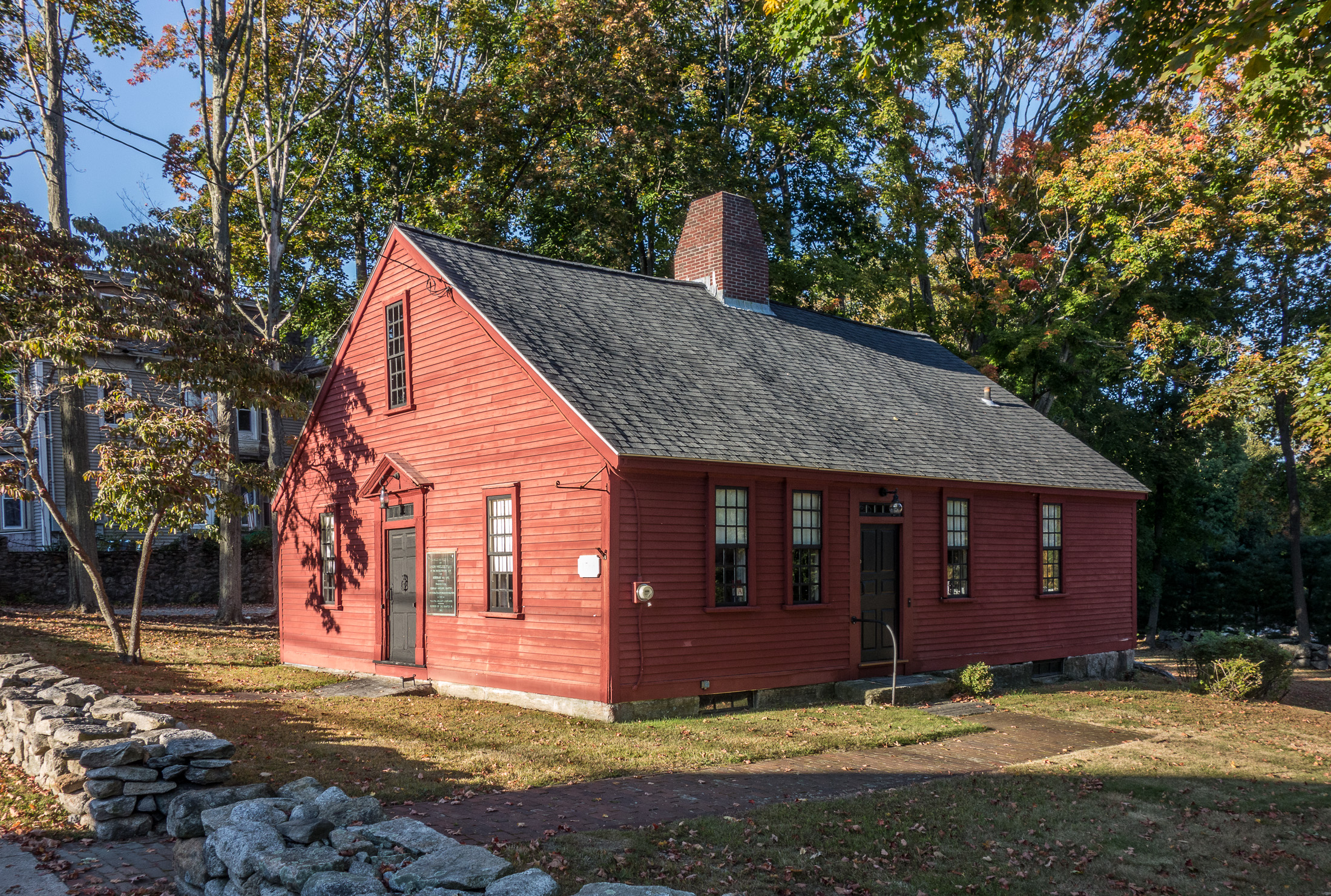
Lt. Simeon Wheelock House, built circa 1765, Now Deborah Wheelock Chapter, Daughters of the American Revolution, Uxbridge, Massachusetts

Simeon Wheelock (March 29, 1741– September 30, 1786) was a blacksmith from Uxbridge, Massachusetts, who served as a minuteman in the Massachusetts militia during the battles of Lexington and Concord in the American Revolutionary War. After the war he was killed while on militia duty protecting the Springfield Armory during Shays' Rebellion.

== Family ==
Wheelock was born to Colonel Silas Wheelock and Hannah Albee of Mendon, Massachusetts, on March 29, 1741. His father was a colonel. Simeon was a great-great grandson of Rev. Ralph Wheelock. Many of Simeon's brothers would also serve in the Revolutionary War. Ralph Wheelock, the original immigrant and Simeon's great grandfather, was the first teacher in the Dedham Public Schools, the first public school in America, founded in Dedham, Massachusetts in the 1640s.

== Life and career ==
Simeon Wheelock served in the French and Indian War in 1760. He married Deborah Thayer of Mendon on November 28, 1763. They settled in Uxbridge that year, and would have eight children. He worked as a blacksmith in a shop adjacent to his home, which still stands in Uxbridge. Wheelock served as Town Clerk of Uxbridge for five years.

With the approach of the American Revolution, Wheelock was a member of the committee of correspondence in Uxbridge in 1774. As first lieutenant in Capt. Joseph Chapin's company of minutemen, he answered the alarm on April 19, 1775, and fought at the battles of Lexington and Concord. His term of service at this time was for 15 days.

Later, he served as Lieutenant in Capt. Samuel Read's company, in a regiment commanded by Lieut. Col. Nathan Tyler, from the alarm of December 8, 1776 to January 21, 1777, at Providence, Rhode Island.

Simeon died in September 1786 at the age of 45 when his horse slipped on the ice while engaged in the suppression of Shays' Rebellion in Springfield. His son Jerry Wheelock was prominent in the textile industry in Uxbridge, joining forces with early woolen mill pioneer, Daniel Day. Shays' Rebellion had its opening salvos in Uxbridge, a year before. Shays' Rebellion was an uprising of farmers related to currency disarray after the Revolution.

== Lieutenant Simeon Wheelock house ==
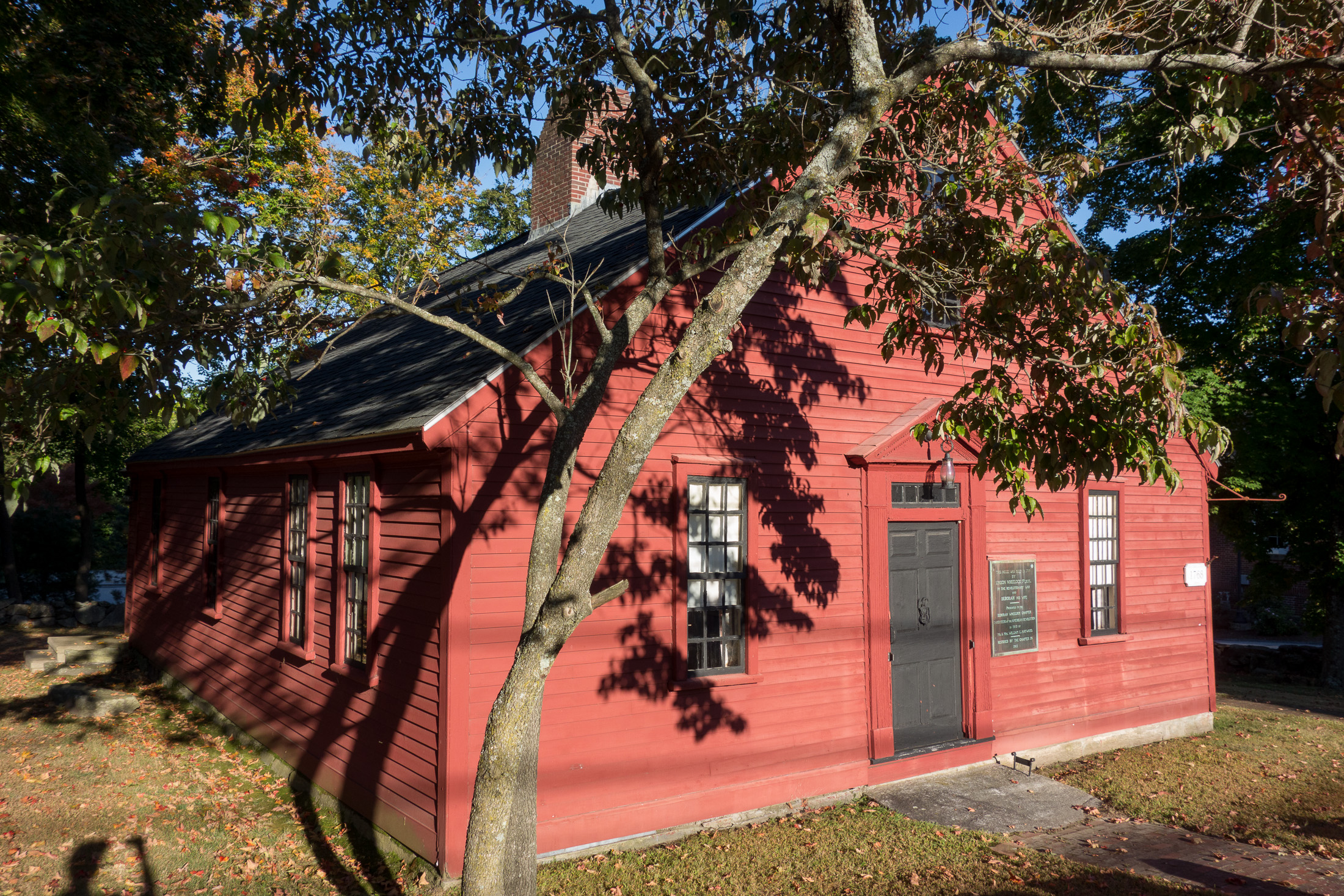
Simon Wheelock House in 2013

The home that Simeon and Deborah Wheelock built is now part of Uxbridge's many historic houses. It is located on North Main Street across from the Masonic Lodge building. Today, it is the local home of the Daughters of the American Revolution and is named for Deborah Wheelock. The building is well preserved as a museum. It was built in 1768 and is located at 33 North Main Street. There are a number of Revolutionary War soldiers and officers from this community. To find more on other soldiers, see the article on Uxbridge, Massachusetts. For more on historical sites in this area see the List of Registered Historic Places in Uxbridge, Massachusetts. This house is in the "Uxbridge Common Historic District" on Massachusetts Route 122 just north of Massachusetts Route 16.

== See also ==
- Uxbridge, Massachusetts Revolutionary Period
- List of Registered Historic Places in Uxbridge, Massachusetts

== Other references ==
- Wheelock, Simeon (Uxbridge), DAR Volume 16, p. 1011
- entry in DAR Vol. 19, p. 113, by Mary Taft Wheelock, DAR ID 18297
