= History of Uxbridge, Massachusetts =

The history of Uxbridge, Massachusetts, founded in 1727, may be divided into its prehistory, its colonial history and its modern industrial history. Uxbridge is located on the Massachusetts-Rhode Island state line, and became a center of the earliest industrialized region in the United States.

== Highlights ==
This community was one place of the earliest beginnings of the American Industrial Revolution. Industrial growth was driven by location, abundant water power, and the Blackstone Canal. Innovators left their mark on America's textile industry. It offers a glimpse of early America- Nipmuc lands, King Phillips War, colonial rule, the Great Awakening, Quakers, and the American Revolution. Uxbridge is the geographic center of the Blackstone River Valley National Heritage Corridor, the earliest industrialized region in the U.S. There are over 375 state or national historic sites here, with an excellent variety of architectural styles. Military uniforms were manufactured here for over 100 years in several large mills. The first U.S. Air Force dress uniform, dubbed "Uxbridge Blue", was made here (see Bernat Mill). In woman's history it claims America's first woman voter, Lydia Chapin Taft.

The town was named after the Earl of Uxbridge, in Uxbridge, England. The Taft family, of England, settled in Mendon (originally called "Mendham"), in 1680, in a section that later became Uxbridge. The Tafts were founders of the town of Uxbridge and Robert Taft, II was on the first Board of Selectmen (town council). The Tafts were said 'locally' to be relatives of the Earl of Uxbridge (though this is not referenced in the appendix of Alfonso Taft's biography). Uxbridge, England derived its name from a 7th-century Anglo-Saxon tribe known as the "Wuxen", (Wuxen Bridge). Early settlers included the Aldriches, the Wheelocks, the Farnums, the Reeds, the Halls, the Willards, the Caprons and the Thayers. The Taft and Aldrich families, began from local immigrant ancestors, and went on to become influential in their new nation. Seth Reed was instrumental in adding "E Pluribus Unum", from many, one, to all U.S. coins. President William Howard Taft's grandfather was an Uxbridge native.

This town played early roles in public education, human rights, women's suffrage, and public health. In the 18th century, the town played early roles in public education as early as 1731, and by establishing 13 district schools in 1797. By the late 20th century, the New York Times recognized Uxbridge, for education reform. Congregational and Quaker traditions emphasized human rights and abolition. Uxbridge was the home of six notable women including: 1) Lydia Chapin Taft, America's first legal colonial woman voter, 2) Deborah Sampson, America's first woman soldier, 3) Abby Kelley Foster, a 19th-century radical social reformer, 4) Alice Bridges, a 1936 Olympic medalist, 5) Jeannine Oppewall, a Hollywood film art Producer, and 6) Jacqueline Liebergott, the first female President of Emerson College in Boston. In 1922, two years after women's suffrage was introduced, the Board of Selectmen defied the Massachusetts's Secretary of State, by appointing the first women jurors in this state. In 1775, the town voted against smallpox vaccination. Footnotes of "unique" public health progress dotted the town's later history. LDS apostle, Ezra Taft Benson grew up here, married, had a child, and ran a local hotel. Effingham Capron not only led the first power looms for woolens in his mills, but was a champion and leader of the local, state and national anti-slavery societies as well as a liberator on the underground railroad.

== Photos ==
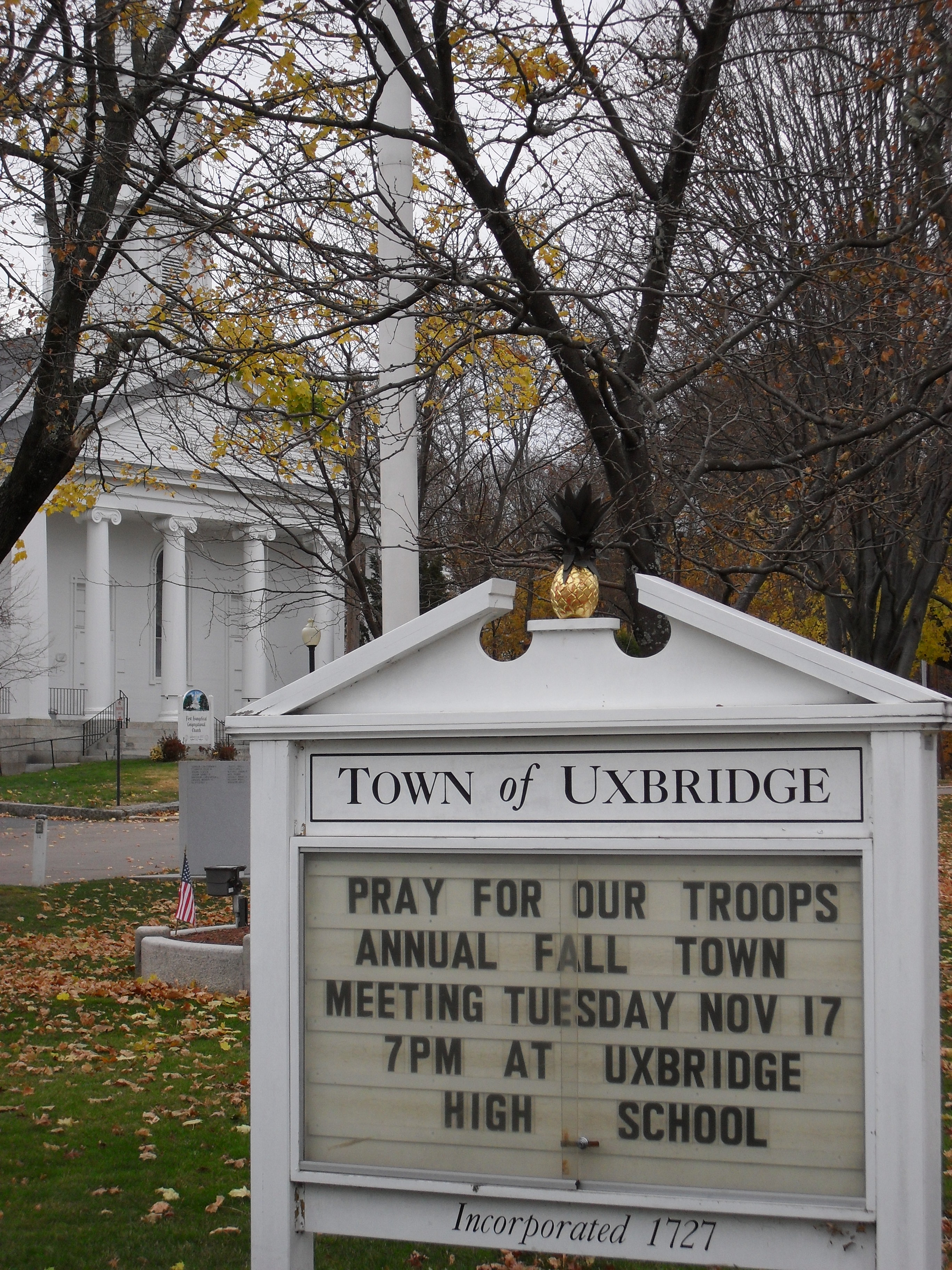
Uxbridge Congregational Church(1731), the first new Congregational Church in Massachusetts during the First Great Awakening Period

Cornet John C. Farnum, Jr. House, 1710. Today houses the Uxbridge Historical Society. In 1727, this house held the first Uxbridge Town Meeting

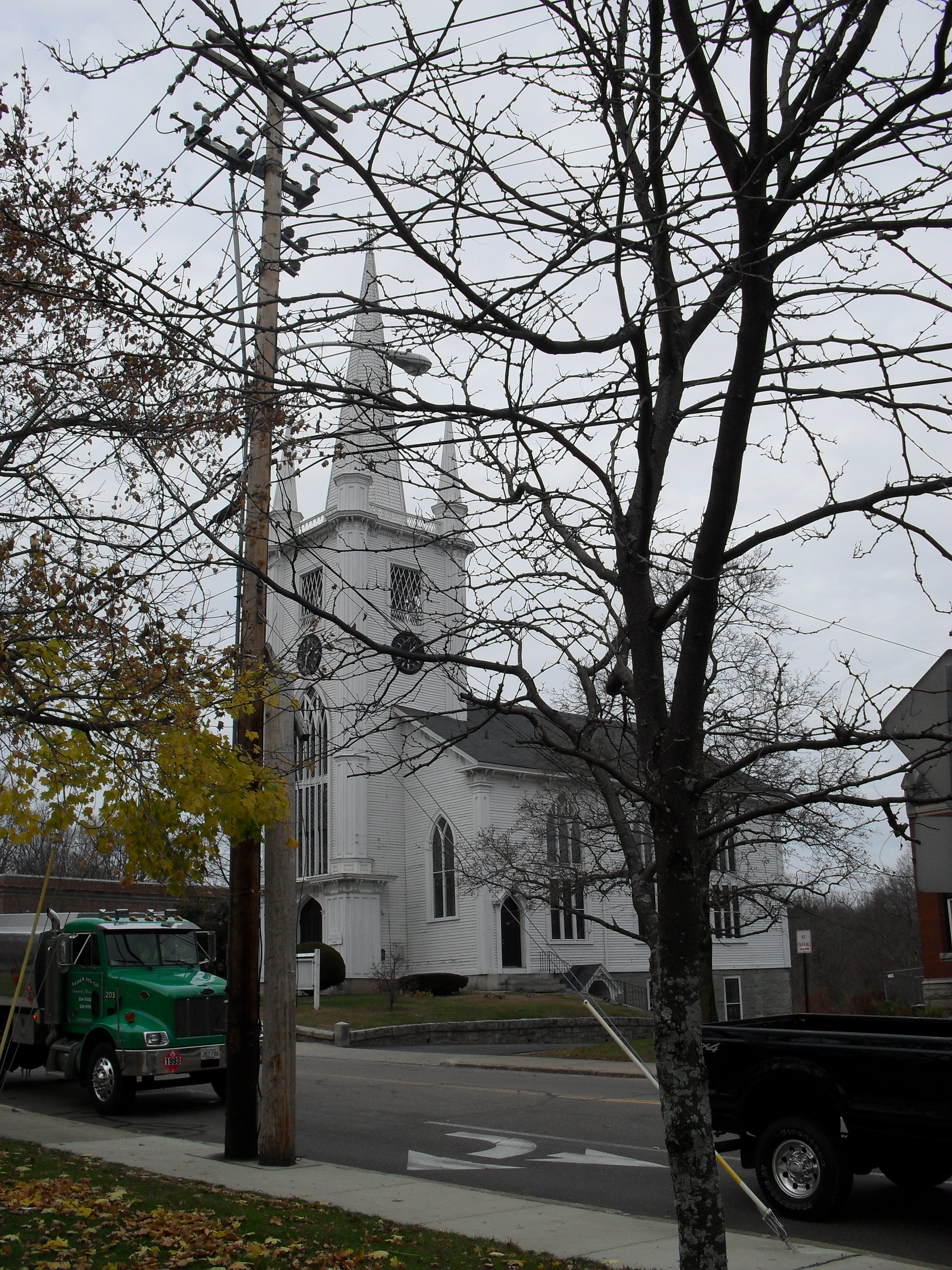
Unitarian Church at Uxbridge, where three term Worcester Mayor, and Uxbridge historian Judge Henry Chapin, delivered a published historical address in 1864 about Uxbridge history, and Lydia Taft's role as America's first woman voter.

== History ==
=== Pre-colonial era ===
Prehistoric indigenous people inhabited this region of Massachusetts. Arrowheads and artifacts have been found in the areas near the local rivers. A first nation, indigenous people, the Nipmuc, pronounced "Nip-Muck", and translated as "small pond people”, settled at Wacentug ("tribe that fished rich waters") and Shock-a-log ("burned place or dry fox place)". Nipmuck is also translated as "people of the fresh waters". The village of Wacentug was located in the plain between the Nipmuc, or "Kuttacuck river",("at the large (or principal) tidal river"), today known as the Blackstone River, and the West River at "Miscoe, ("the great hill)". The "Kittacuck" river was said to have been plentiful with Salmon and Lamprey in the pre-colonial and colonial time. Wacentug had about 50+ inhabitants by the mid-17th century. The Nipmuc were an Algonquian tribe who had a highly developed agriculture. In this region of small lakes and rivers, they grew corn (maize), beans and squash, (the "three sisters"), had a graphite mine (at Sturbridge), and developed a written language. The tribe moved with the seasons, fishing and farming in the gently rolling hills, woodlands, and streams of what would become the heart of southern New England. Nipmuc villages were typical of their Algonquian heritage. The Nipmuck nation people still live in the southern Worcester County area, especially near Grafton and Webster.

=== Colonial era ===
Puritan Missionary John Eliot helped start Praying Indian villages such as Wacentug. The Praying Indians were also visited by Rev. Gookin. "Unofficial" European settlement of the area began in the 1640s. In 1659, The Massachusetts General Court granted early pioneers the rights to purchase land in the Nipmuck territory. In 1662, settlers from Braintree and Weymouth signed a deed with the Nipmuc chief "Great John" and bought Native land, "8 miles^{2}(13km)^{2} 15 miles (24 km) W. of Medfield" "for 24 pound Ster". Squinshepauke plantation became Mendon in 1667. Robert Taft 1, reportedly, had first settled here in 1669. The settlement burned in King Philip's War in 1675, and the first Massachusetts colonists were killed.

Here is a quote of the signing of the original deed for the Squinshepauk plantation which became the town of Mendon later in 1667. Signed, sealed and delivered the day and year above written in the presenfe of John Eliot senior John Eliot junior Daniel Weld senior Great John set to his hand & seal and delivered the deed to Moses Payne & Peter Brackett this 8th day of September 1663 as witnesses William Allis, N"athauiel Brackett Anawassanauke Ills ^ Marke and A seale Quashaamiit, liis /C Marke and A seale Namsconont liis Q Marke and A seale Great John :^ his marke and A seale A Seale O and noe hand, source document: Metcalf, Annals of the History of Mendon, 1880.

King Philip’s War took its toll on settlers and the local indigenous people. Native Nipmuc and other indigenous people were taken into slavery in the aftermath. https://www.brown.edu/news/2017-02-15/enslavement

When the war ended, resettlement followed in 1680, and more families moved westward and settled near Wacentug. Farmers cultivated fertile land in the intervals between its three rivers. The patriarch of the famous American Taft family, Robert Taft I, and the Aldriches settled here circa 1680. Settlers became increasingly anxious to have their own separate town, but the process took years.

The town of Uxbridge was finally incorporated in June 1727, and Farnum House held the first town meeting. One of the first official acts at the next annual Town Meeting, was to appropriate fifteen gallons of 'ye good rum for ye raising of ye meeting house'. The colonial town was an agrarian center, with a smattering of grist mills, distilleries, and iron works. The town was named for the Earl of Uxbridge, who was then a member of the "Privy Council" in England.

The first listing of officers of the town is as follows: the town moderator was Eddie Greene, the first listed selectman was Robert Taft, 2nd, followed by Ebeneazer Read, Wooland Thompson, Lieutenant Joseph White and Edmund Rawson. The Constables were Thomas White and William Brown, Jr. "Tything men" were Joshua Whitney and Joseph Taft. Salmon [sic] Wood was the Treasurer. Fence Viewers were John Cook and William Holbrook while "hog-reaves")[keepers of the peace involving swine], were Gershom Keith and Simeon Peck. The incorporated colonial township also included the jurisdiction of what is today the town of Northbridge.

Reverend Nathan Webb's church, the first church in Uxbridge, was the Colony's first new Congregational church in the Great Awakening period. Webb and his church played a prominent role in the colonial history of Uxbridge. Members of Nathan Webb's church would help to make history, including among others, Josiah and Lydia Taft, Captain Bezaleel Taft, Sr., Seth Reed, and Samuel Spring. Uxbridge settlers, like Lieutenant John Read, and Captain Josiah Taft, fought in the French and Indian Wars. Captain Josiah Taft's widow, Lydia Chapin Taft, voted to fund this war in 1756, a first step for women's suffrage, legislated by the Uxbridge Town Meeting. Her estate paid the largest taxes in the town of Uxbridge. The town meeting minutes record her voting again in 1758, and 1765. She lived to see her son, Captain Bezaleel Taft, Sr., fight to defend the new United States in the War for independence. Lydia Chapin Taft died in 1778. Judge Henry Chapin later wrote, in 1864, that by allowing the "widow Taft" to vote, the town followed the principal of "no taxation without representation" and "Uxbridge may one day become famous in the history of women's suffrage. Lyida's historic vote was 164 years before the XIXth Amendment in 1920 which allowed women in America to vote.

The little town's future as an industrial center was secure, with good quality bog iron ore, three or more iron forges, and renewable energy from the Mumford, West, and Blackstone rivers.

==== Quakers ====
Smithfield, RI Quakers, including Richard Mowry, came here and built mills, railroads, houses, tools and Conestoga wagon wheels. Southwick's store housed the "Social and Instructive Library". The Uxbridge Friends Meetinghouse, built from bricks made on Mosses Farnum's farm, had nationally prominent abolitionists Abby Kelley Foster, and Effingham Capron as members. The 450 member local anti-slavery society, led by Effingham Capron, had a quarter of the town, as members.

== Photos ==
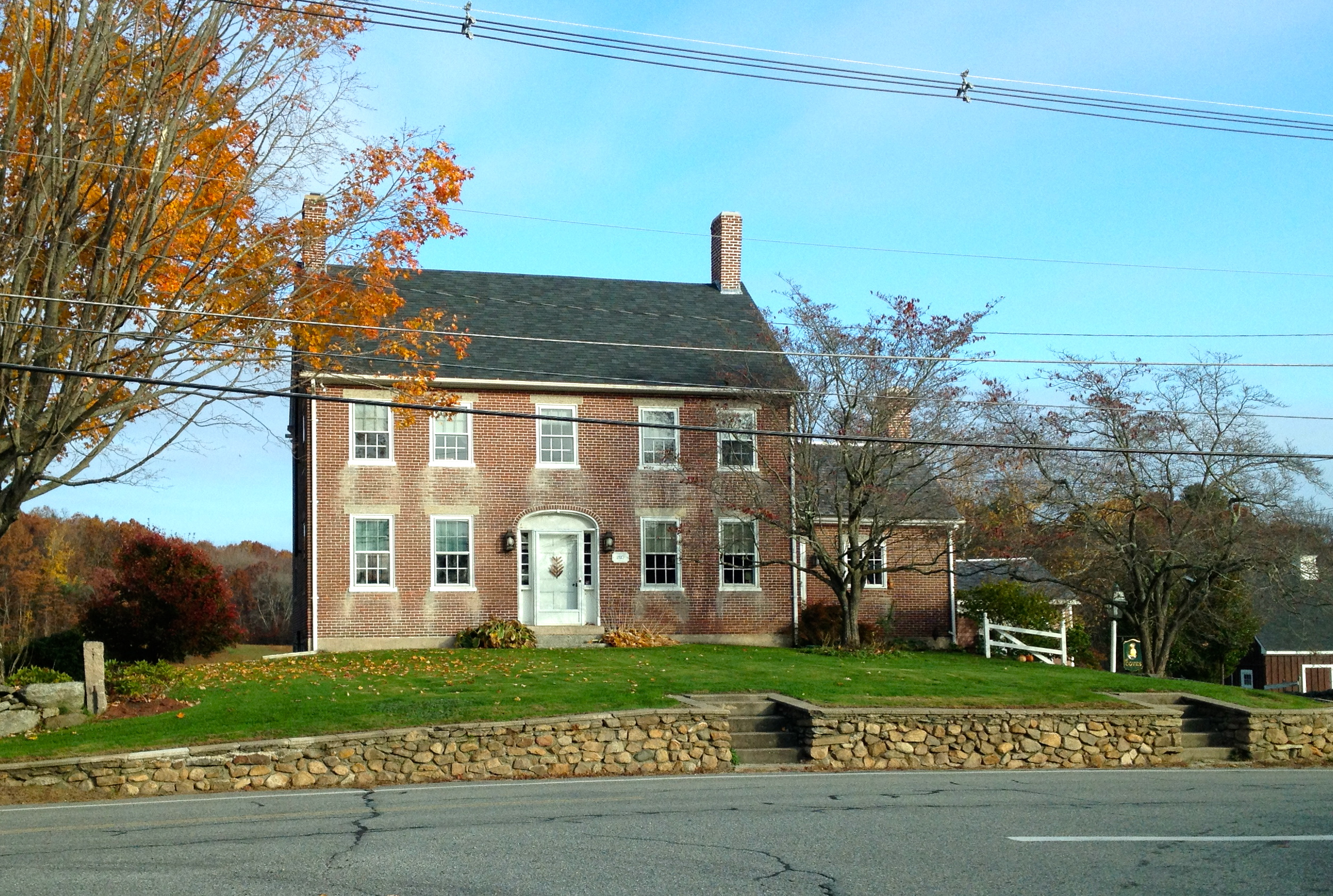
Jacob Aldrich House; Quaker style house..

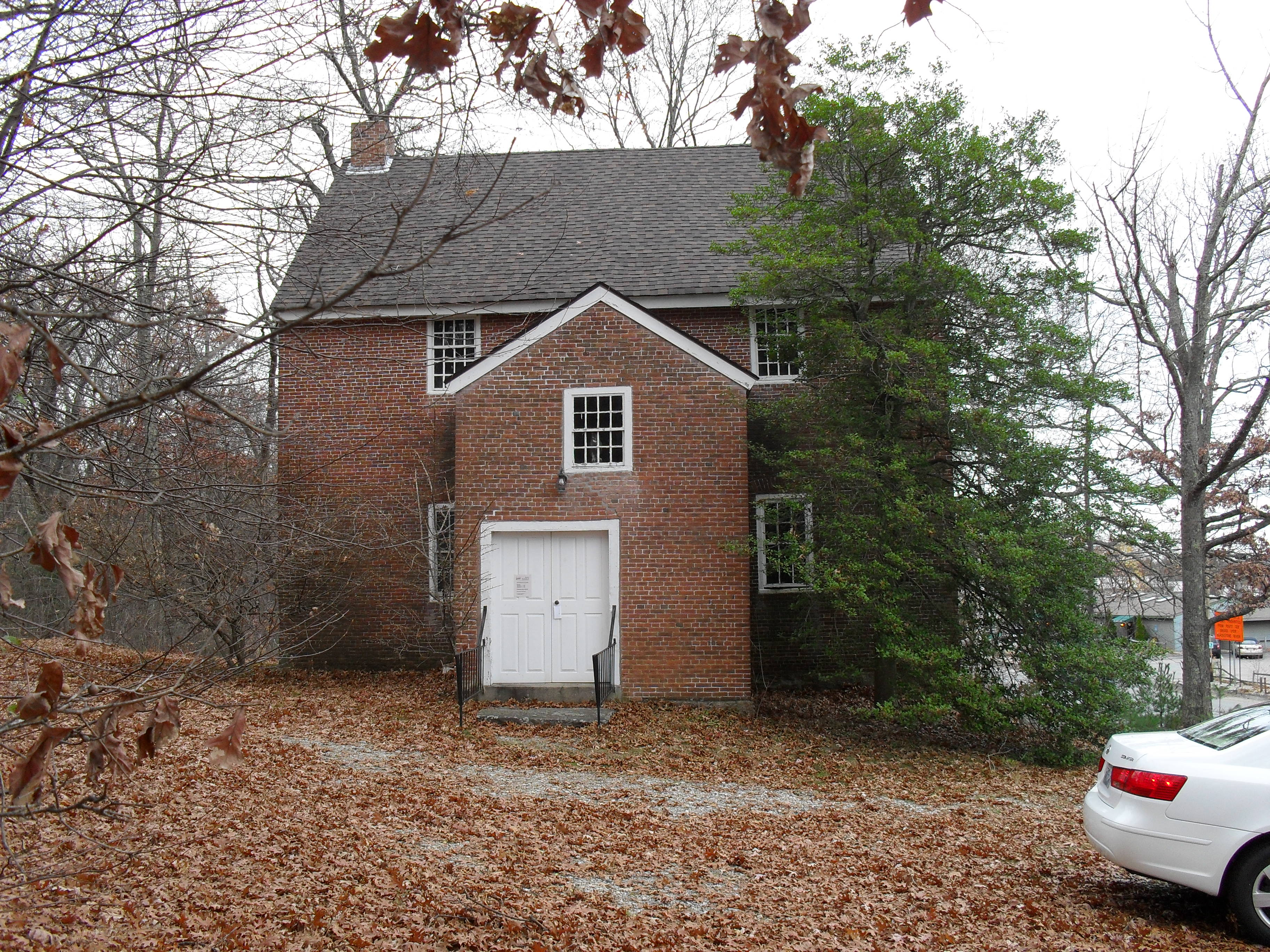
Friends Meeting House(1770), Quaker Highway at Route 98, Uxbridge, MA, one of the last crude brick church buildings in America. Started by Quakers from Rhode Island with ties to Moses Brown who founded Brown University, early abolitionist movement

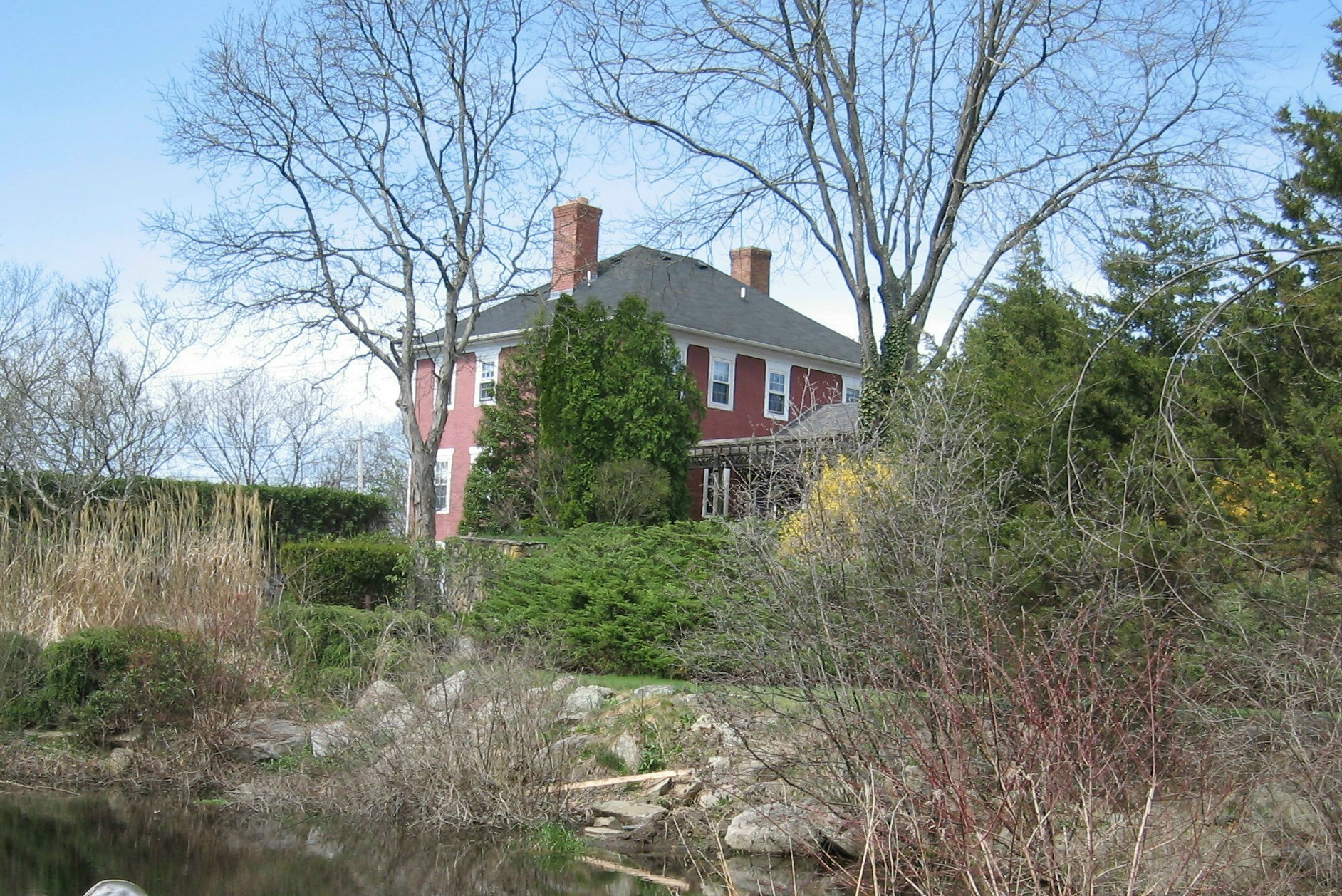
Quaker period, Willam & Mary Farnum House on Albee Road, built 1821

Shortly before the Revolution, circa 1769, Smithfield, Rhode Island Quaker abolitionists, with ties to Moses Brown, who founded Brown University, settled here. Among them was Richard Mowry, an inventor of significance in the industrial revolution. Local families, such as Moses Farnum, also settled at the Quaker colony in the southern outskirts of Uxbridge, along what is today Massachusetts Route 146A. The "Quaker City" settlement changed the character of the town. The Quakers built mills, railroads, houses, tools and Conestoga wagon wheels. Southwick's store housed Uxbridge's "Social and Instructive Library", established in 1775.

Friends Meetinghouse, built on Moses Farnum's farm, with bricks made from a local brickyard, claimed "fiery abolitionist" Abby Kelley Foster. Kelley Foster became a national figure in the radical wing of the abolitionist movement, leading Lucy Stone and Susan B. Anthony into the cause. The Second Great Awakening touched Quakers, women's suffrage, human rights, and changed local mortuary practices for the poor. The "Uxbridge monthly meeting" later disowned Kelley because of her "radical views". Historic Quaker homes were Underground Railroad sites at least from the time period of Abby Kelley Foster. Abby Kelley, at Dutchess County New York, would later write to a friend, "our cause is steady onward". Effingham Capron, was a member here and rose to national leadership in the local, state, and national anti-slavery societies.

The influential American Aldrich family got its start here, and the village of Aldrich was next to Friend's Meeting House. The family's cemetery, near the corner of Glendale Road and Aldrich Street is where the immigrant ancestor, George Aldrich, is said to have been re-buried, circa 1682. Quaker families, including Elisha Southwick, built Conestoga wagon wheels and made Kentucky Blue Jeans in the 19th century.

Agriculture was prominent in Quaker City and south Uxbridge, with fertile land, scenic rivers, and cranberry bogs. Benedict Arnold's widow, Peggy Shippen, a Philadelphia heiress and a Quaker, settled in Uxbridge before she died in 1836.

== Revolutionary war era ==
Debt from the French and Indian war led to heavy British taxes on the colonies which led to the American Revolution. Two adventurous brothers, Seth and Joseph Read joined local Committees of Correspondence by July 1774. Colonel John Spring led a Massachusetts Militia training company of Uxbridge men who prepared for the battle. Dozens of local men fought at the Lexington Alarm and at Bunker Hill. Lt. Col. Seth Read fought at Bunker Hill under Colonel John Patterson. General George Washington stopped at a tavern owned by Colonel Seth Read in June 1775 before assuming command of the Continental Army in Boston. Colonels Seth Read, J. Read, Spring, Tyler, Chapin, Captains Green, Bezaleel Taft, Hall, Rawson, and Lieutenants Wheelock, J. Taft, Farnum, and White served with several companies of local heroes. Baxter Hall, an 18-year-old Battle of Lexington drummer, served at Bunker Hill and at West Point when General Benedict Arnold escaped. Samuel Spring, a native of Uxbridge, trained under Rev. Nathan Webb, and at Princeton College, and became a Revolutionary War chaplain commissioned in the militia at the Siege of Boston. Rev. Spring then served under Colonel Benedict Arnold, in the invasion of Canada, while Lt. Colonel Seth Read served in a separate regiment, under Colonel John Paterson. Samuel carried Benedict Arnold and Aaron Burr, his Princeton classmate, off of separate battlefields. Samuel, "a fundamentalist Congregationalist", went on to be a renowned clergyman in Newburyport, with published works, and a founder of the Massachusetts Missionary Society.

Dozens of soldiers from Uxbridge served in the American Revolution, mostly as Massachusetts militiamen. The most prominently represented families were the Tafts, and the Wheelocks. Over a dozen Tafts fought in the war, and at least 4 Wheelock soldiers were from Uxbridge including Lt. Simeon, Paul, and two named Luther Wheelock.

Deborah Sampson, America's first woman soldier, enlisted in the Continental Army at Bellingham as "Robert Shurtlieff of Uxbridge" by convincing the Uxbridge sergeant that she was a teenage boy. She was assigned to the unit under Noah Taft and wounded in battle at Tarrytown, New York. After being wounded, Deborah served with General John Patterson, who Seth Read had served under. General George Washington gave her an honorable discharge, some money and some advice. Deborah went on to become a women's rights hero.

Shays' Rebellion, an uprising of farmers related to currency disarray, had its opening salvos in Uxbridge on Feb. 3, 1783. Gov. John Hancock suppressed local riots, after a request by Colonel Nathan Tyler of Uxbridge. Lieutenant Simeon Wheelock, whose family became local textile pioneers, died at Springfield near the Armory when he was killed by a horse. Shays' Rebellion so alarmed George Washington that he emerged from retirement in 1786 and 1787 to advocate a stronger national government. Dr. Samuel Willard, (who reportedly held slaves prior to 1783), fought in Shays' Rebellion and represented Uxbridge in Massachusetts's ratification of the U.S. Constitution. Massachusetts was the first state to outlaw slavery in 1783, (with Seth Reed representing the town, and Governor John Hancock signing the legislation).

As the Revolutionary war came to a close, Seth Read, whose father John had been an officer in the French and Indian War, served in the Massachusetts legislature. This was the time of great turmoil of currency following the Revolution. In March 1786, Reed petitioned both houses of the legislature, to mint Massachusetts coins, both copper and silver. The legislature concurred. Seth Reed somehow became instrumental in adding E pluribus unum ("Out of Many, One,") to U.S. coins. Massachusetts "coppers" were among the first coins ever minted in the United States. E Pluribus Unum is now considered the "traditional motto" of the United States.

In 1789, President Washington, on his inaugural tour of New England, from Boston to the capitol at New York City, made his first overnight stop in Uxbridge. The President had just been refused lodging at what he believed was an Inn in Uxbridge, Mass. but the Amidon Inn, was in fact at Mendon. He traveled further to North Uxbridge, to stay at the home of former Revolutionary War soldier Samuel Taft, and later wrote his hosts to thank them, and sent them gifts, including "chintz", and it's part of our history.

== Photos ==
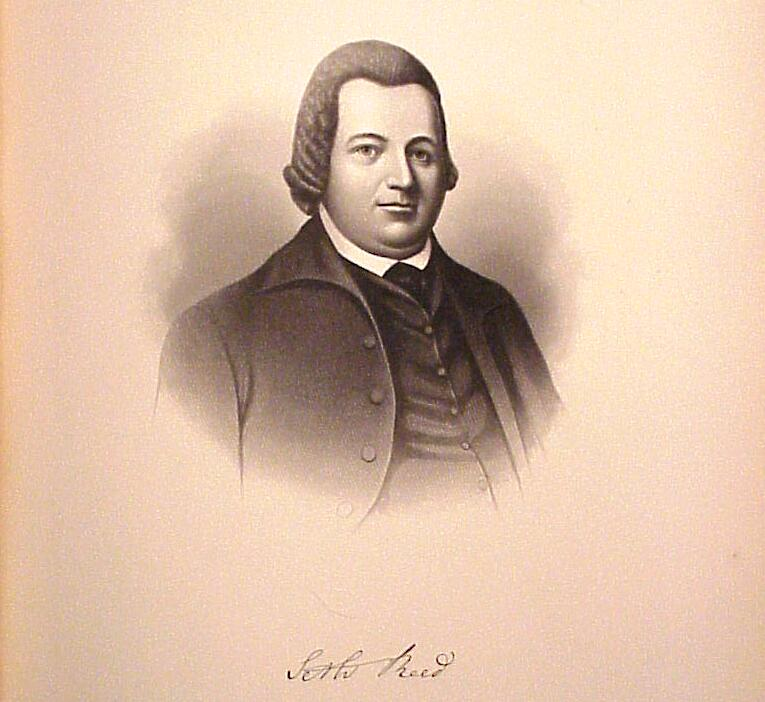
Lt. Col. Seth Read, fought at Bunker Hill, added E Pluribus Unum to U.S. coins, and established Erie, Pennsylvania

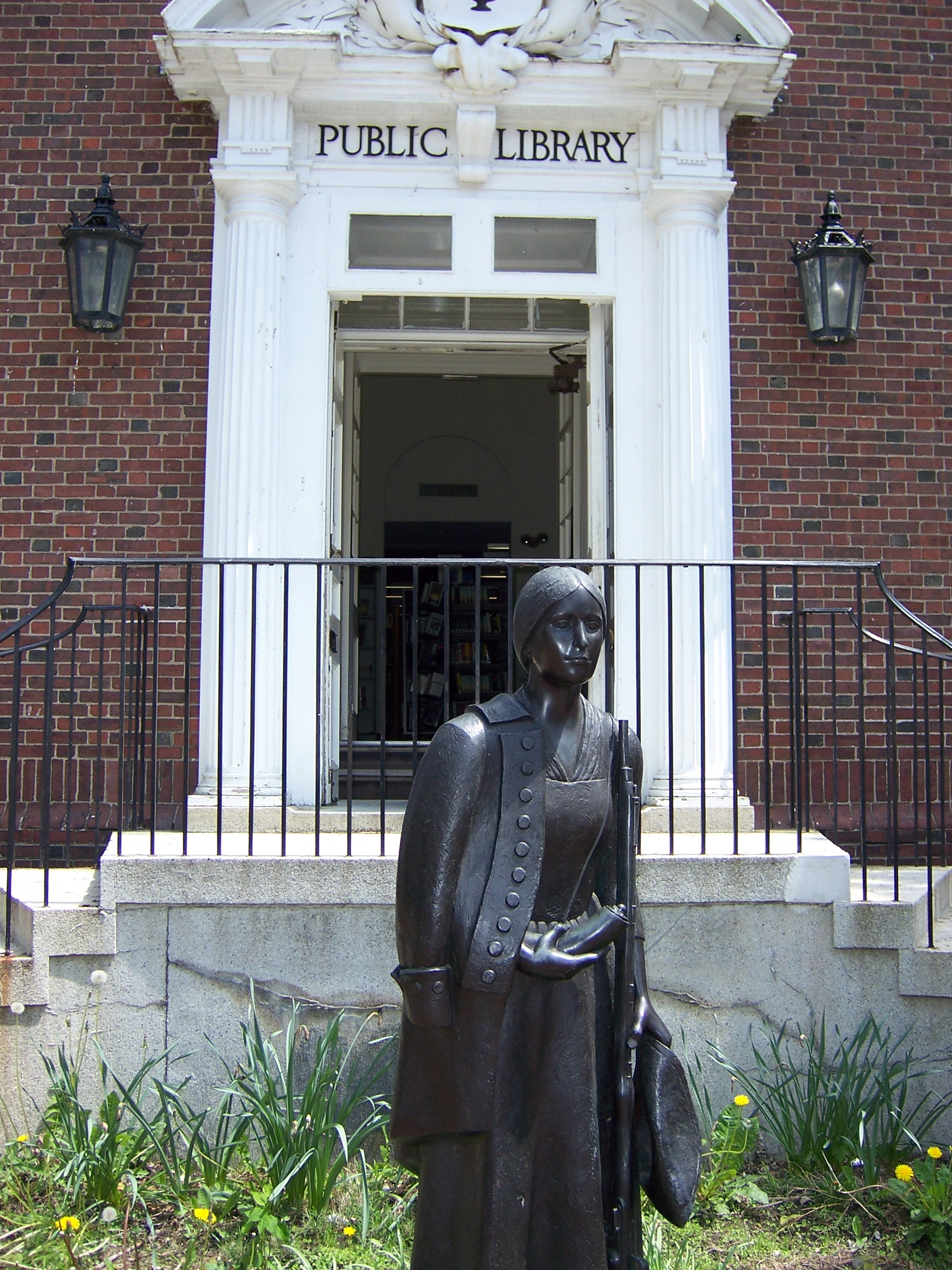
Deborah Sampson, "America's First Woman Soldier", enlisted as Robert Shurtlieff of Uxbridge" portrait 1780

=== Colonial to modern era ===
==== History of local education ====
The town of Uxbridge and the Commonwealth of Massachusetts both led the United States in establishing public education. The Town of Dedham, Massachusetts had the first American taxpayer funded school in 1643, and the Wheelock family's ancestor, Rev. Ralph Wheelock was its first teacher. Uxbridge's first library was established in 1775, and its first grammar school was opened in 1788. In 1797, the town of Uxbridge appropriated $2,000 and opened 13 district schools, one for each village and section of town. The Ironstone School, now home to the South Uxbridge Community Association, located on Ironstone Street; the Elmdale School, now the Oddfellows Hall; and the Happy Hollow School, now located on Carney Street, are each examples of the former one-room district schools. The Uxbridge Academy was a sought after New England prep school between 1818 and 1851 with an outstanding educator, Joshua Mason Macomber.

In 1797, Uxbridge appropriated two thousand dollars to erecting or creating the following 13 District schools:

District 1 – Willard Ellerson	District 2- S W Scott	District 3 – Holbrook's	District 4 – Rivulet	District 5 – Center	District 6 – Martin Brown	District 7 – Ironstone	District 8 – Jacob Aldrich	District 9 – Ben Buffum's	District 10 – Williams	District 11- Charles E. Whitin	District 12 – Caleb Richardson	District 13 – Wheelock

=== The Uxbridge Academy and Solomon's Temple Lodge ===
The Uxbridge Academy was a prestigious New England preparatory institution in the early 19th century which graduated a number of prominent citizens. Among them were Marcus Spring, Colonel John Capron, Moses Taft, George Boardman Boomer, and Richard Sayles. Famous Historian and writer, William Augustus Mowry wrote a historical sketch about Uxbridge Academy. Joshua Mason Macomber, A.M., M.D., was the principal of Uxbridge Academy from 1840–1850. This was said to be the "Palmy" period of the academy under the direction of this successful educator. The Uxbridge Academy developed a widespread reputation and during his tenure attracted hundreds of students from communities in at least six states. The building that housed Uxbridge Academy still stands on the Town Common in Uxbridge, Massachusetts. The Uxbridge academy began in 1818 as a secondary school in an upstairs location. Today the Uxbridge Academy is still occupied by the local Solomon's Temple Lodge.

On December 10, 1818, a small group of 16 men got together and met at Spring’s Hall Tavern in North Uxbridge, which was located at the north end of Rivulet St, and called the first meeting of Solomon's Temple Lodge of Masons. Each of these men professed a true faith in a higher being and gathered in brotherhood, and called to order the first meeting of Solomon’s Temple Lodge of Ancient Free & Accepted Masons. Masonry was already a solid establishment in Massachusetts, having previously receiving a charter from the Grand Lodge of England in 1733. The first meeting was held on that very day and meetings continue to this day. As the records of the lodge indicate, the first order of business was to find a meeting place that they could call their own. On June 3, 1819, the brethren voted to erect its own hall noting that the area North of the town common would be a suitable place. In conjunction with the town, the building was raised with the second floor being used for Masonic purposes and the first floor being used as a private schoolhouse. This building would be known as the “Academy Building.” The Lodge was the first to make use of the building with 29 members present on November 25, 1819. The Lodge has met in this very building ever since, a record purported to be unmatched by any other Masonic Lodge in Massachusetts. Abiding by its vows to charity, the Lodge allowed the hall to be used by several religious and fraternal organizations, including the First Congregational Society in 1835, The Uxbridge Lodge of Odd Fellows in 1847, the Sons of Temperance in 1860, Court Purity in 1891, and Rathbobone Lodge, Knights of Pythias in 1898. Thus began a long line of charitable works performed by the Lodge that passed down through the years.

== Photos ==
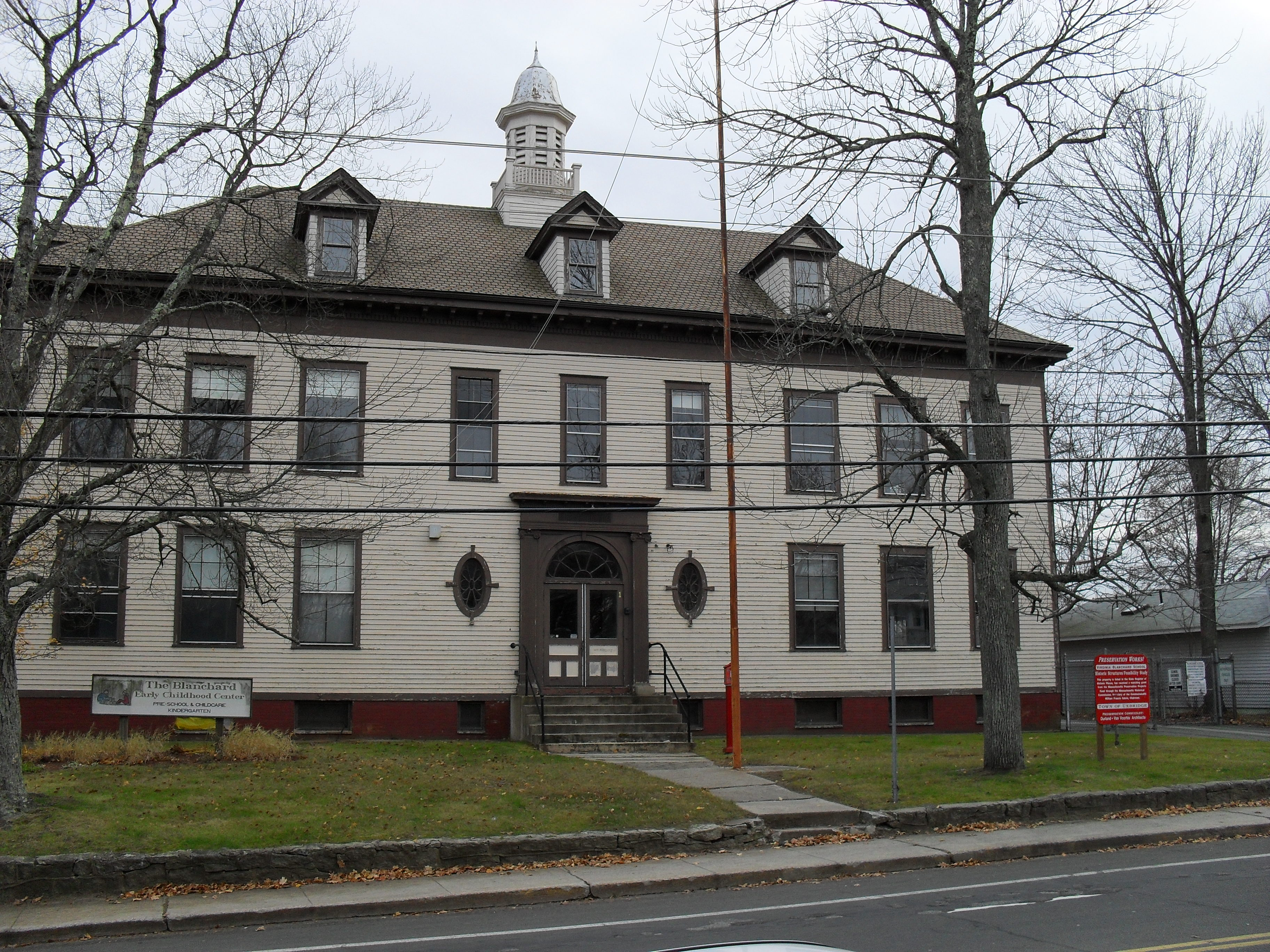
Virginia Blanchard Pre K Education Center

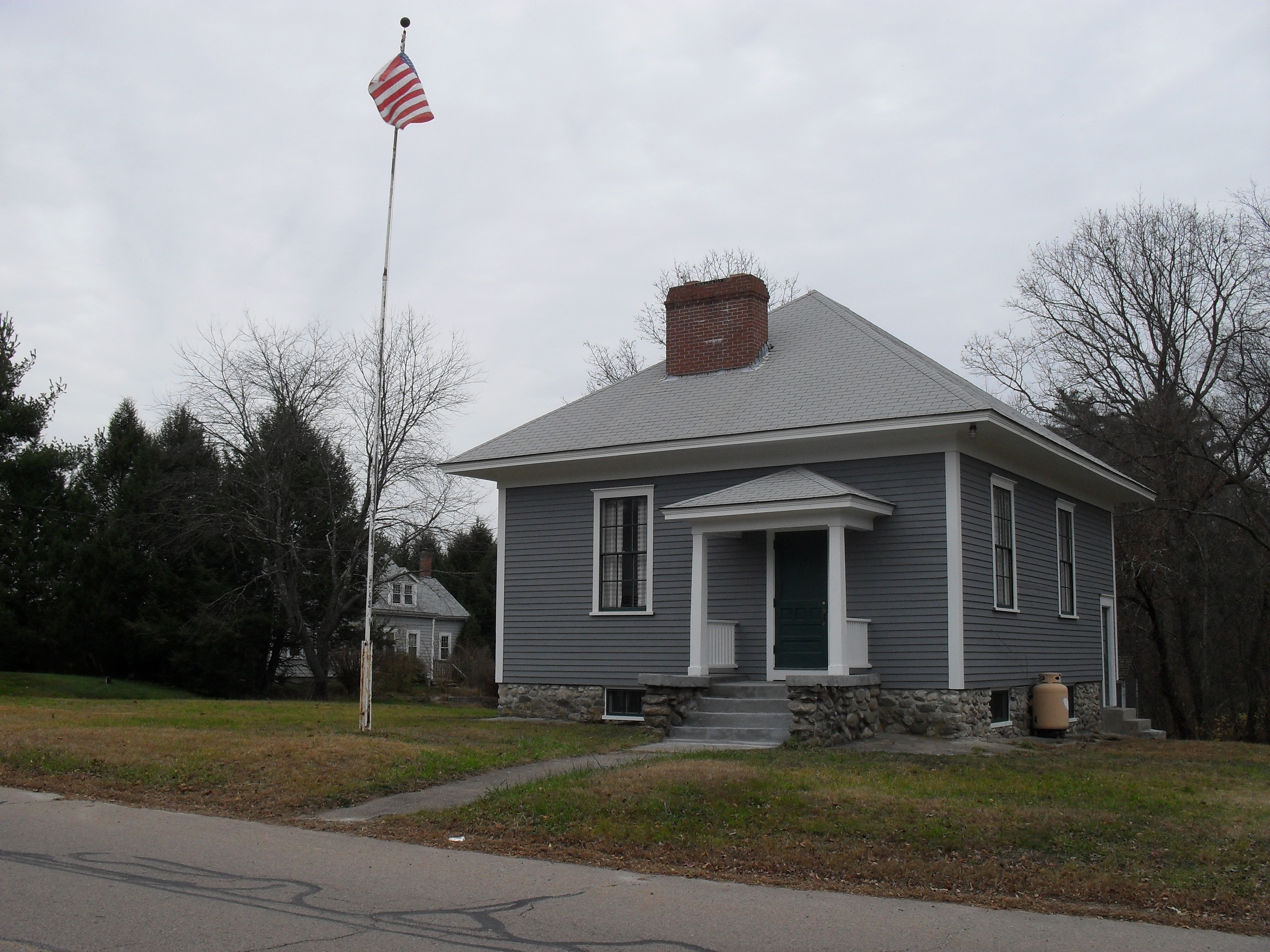
Former one room Ironstone school, now maintained by South Uxbridge Community Association

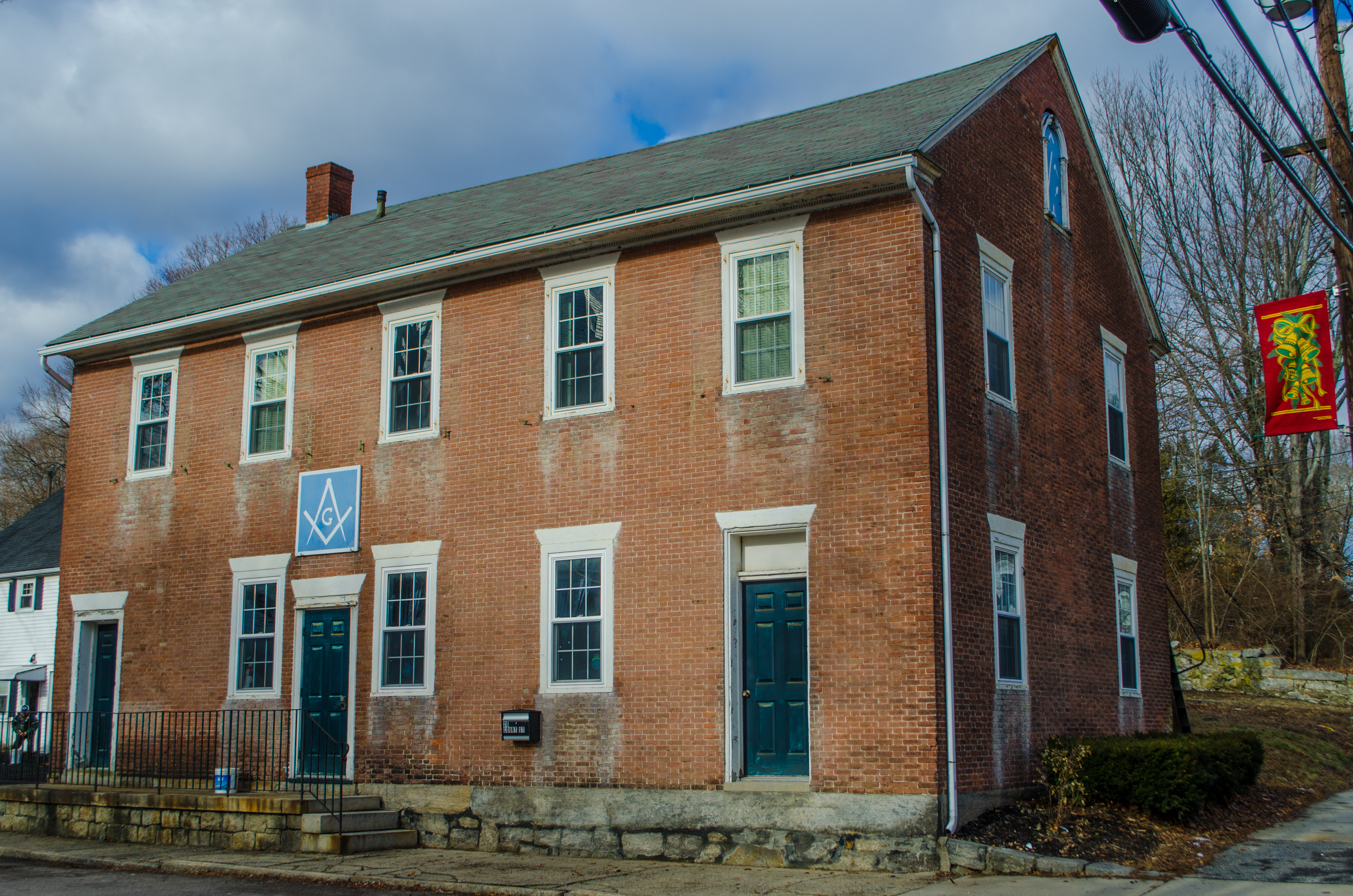
former Uxbridge Academy Building, Uxbridge Common District. Today this building houses the Masonic Lodge

=== Transportation and the Blackstone Canal ===
Transportation evolved at this crossroads village as Nipmuck trails gave way to pioneer roads. Robert Taft I and his sons built the first bridge across the Blackstone River in 1709. The Middle Post Road, set down by Ben Franklin as the 9th Massachusetts turnpike, began locally around "Colonel Crown's land" and meandered past rocky Yankee farms and woods, as it carried French and Indian War troops, Revolutionary war regiments, and their Commander in Chief, 1812 War supplies, and passed a Civil War camp near "Stage Coach Hill". Taverns along the middle post road here included the Wood Tavern, at Rice City, the Spring Tavern and the Taft Tavern at North Uxbridge, and the Thayer Tavern, near East Douglas. Today the old east-west Middle Post Road is known locally as Hartford Avenue.

When production from the mills began, "teamsters" drove huge wagons, pulled by "teams" of horses, on the "Great Road" south to Woonsocket and Providence, and north along Main St. to Worcester. The Great Road was the main stage route from Worcester to Providence.

John Brown, a Providence, Rhode Island merchant, first attempted to build a canal along the Blackstone River in 1796. However, it was General Edward Carrington, a prominent Providence merchant, who later succeeded and built the Blackstone canal. The new canal on the Blackstone would become the second U.S. barge canal, following the Erie Canal in upstate New York. The commercial ties between Uxbridge and Providence were historically strong. Beginning in 1824, Irish laborers who had just completed the Erie Canal, arrived here, and built the 46-mile (74 km) Blackstone Canal. The barge canal had parallel tow paths for horses, and carried thousands of tons of goods yearly from Worcester to Providence, beginning in 1828. The canal boat trip from Worcester to Providence, took two days, and Uxbridge was the overnight stopping point. The first of the canal's many barges was named for General Carrignton's wife, "The Lady Carrington".

The Providence and Worcester Railroad was completed in 1847 and the canal ceased operations in 1848. The New York and New England Railroad, Willimantic division, ran through Ironstone with connections to Hartford, Boston, and New York City.

An early 20th century electric Trolley ran through Uxbridge to Whitinsville and Woonsocket, and the old trolley bridge remains today.

A World War II US Army Air Corps B-24 Liberator crashed on an Uxbridge hillside on May 18, 1944, known as the "May Day, May Day" crash site. The crash site is less than 3 miles (4.8 km) from the Uxbridge mill, which three years later, developed the first US Air Force dress Uniform, a.k.a. "Uxbridge Blue".

== Photos ==
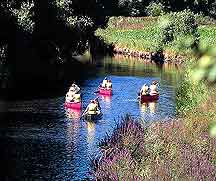
Canoes on the Blackstone Canal. Horses, on parallel towpaths, pulled barges and carried thousands of tons of goods yearly to Providence, Rhode Island and Worcester

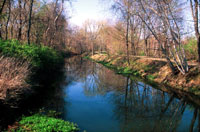
The Blackstone canal and towpath, provided early 19th century Uxbridge with freight transportation

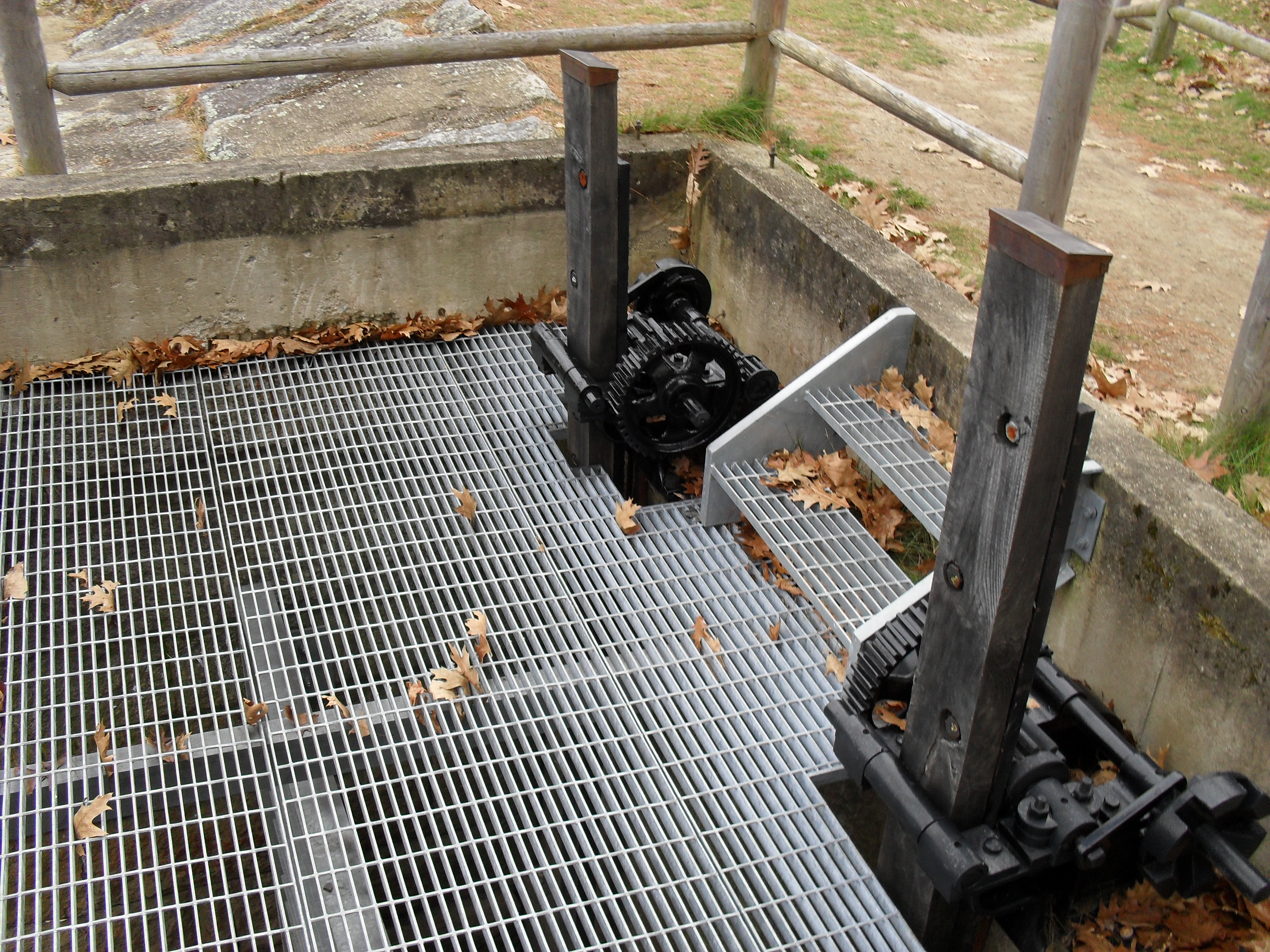
View of a control gate on the Blackstone Canal at the Blackstone River and Canal State Park in Uxbridge

=== Public health footnotes ===
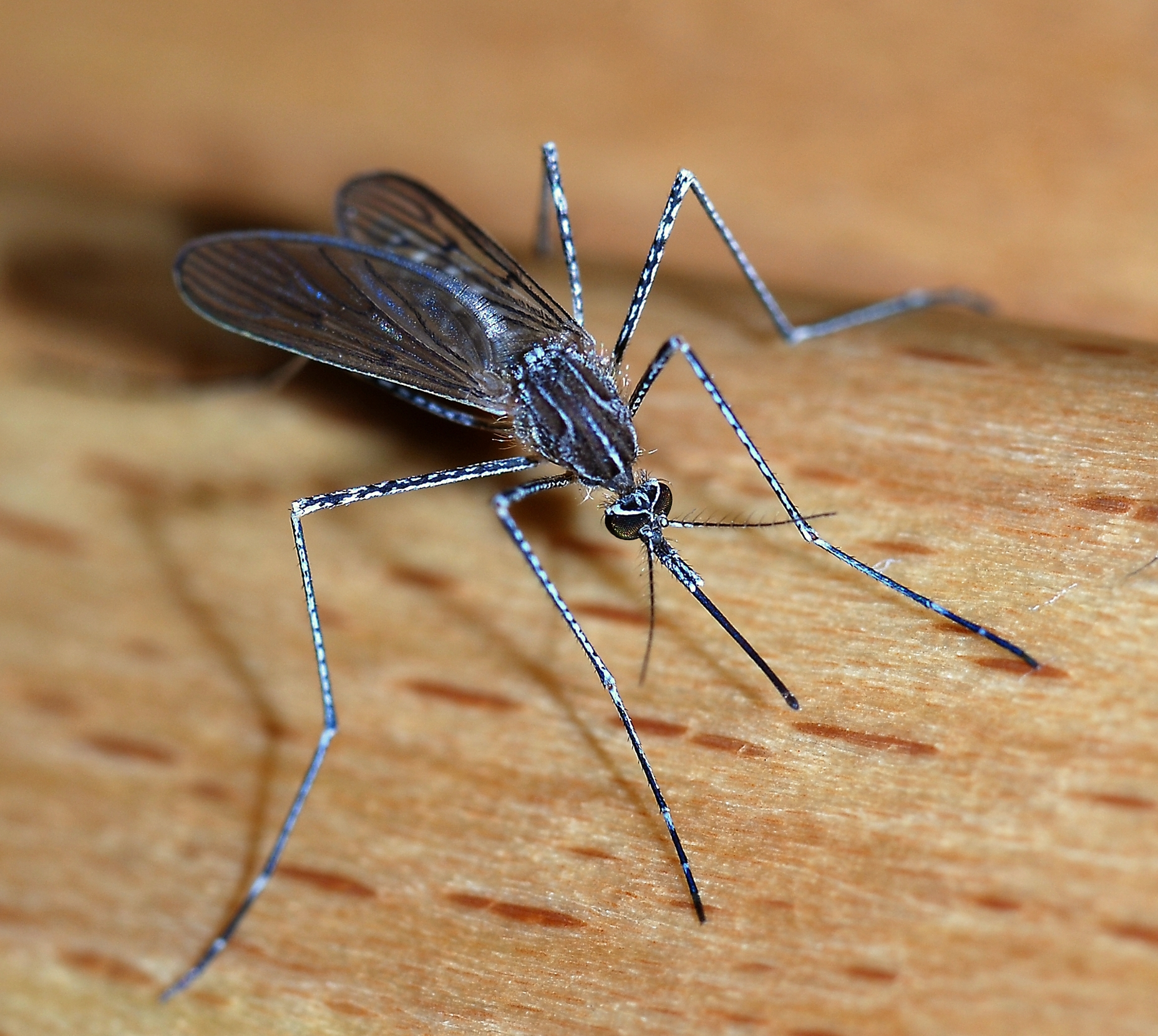
An 1896 Uxbridge malaria outbreak led to study of mosquito-malaria links and prevention

Public health history began locally when smallpox, killed Nipmuc, settlers, and soldiers in Colonel Seth Read's regiment. Uxbridge voted against smallpox vaccine in a 1775 town meeting. Colonel Read, who was not "variolated", became very ill in the invasion of Canada. His unit suffered from smallpox and starvation forcing him to leave the Continental Army in 1776. Benjamin Rush advised, and George Washington ordered, the Continental Army to be vaccinated by "variolation". Dr. Samuel Willard treated local smallpox victims. Footnotes of public health history dotted the town's later history.

Uxbridge published the first 123 years of the town's vital records, through 1850, recording ages, genders, names, and some causes of death. The death of "Benedict Arnold's widow" is recorded here in 1836. Premature, and accidental deaths were common. Infant mortality was high, with children not surviving infancy or dying of childhood diseases. Infection-related deaths included "Quincy", smallpox, "dysentary", and tuberculosis. Local selectman Joseph Richardson died of smallpox in 1825. Senator Bezaleel Taft, Jr., (who was married to Samuel Spring's daughter), and textile pioneer Daniel Day, both died of tuberculosis, "consumption", in the 1840s.

In December 1885, Leonard White (physician) published a report, on the deaths of two children, two weeks after "vaccination" by an unknown practitioner. An 1896 Uxbridge malaria outbreak prompted health officer, Dr. White, to write a report to the State Board of Health, which led to study of mosquito-malaria links, and the first efforts for malaria prevention. State pathologist Theobald Smith, warned White about possible mosquito-malaria links. Smith asked that White's son collect mosquito specimens for further analysis, and that citizens 1) add screens to windows, and 2) drain collections of water. In the 20th century, the local board of health assured childhood immunizations, and school health, including polio vaccines.

=== Industrial era: 19th century to mid-20th century ===
The Blackstone Valley was a major contributor to the American Industrial Revolution. Large scale industrial development began at Uxbridge as early as 1775. Richard Mowry, an Uxbridge farmer, built and marketed equipment to manufacture woolen, linen or cotton cloth, around the time of the Revolution. Uxbridge, an early mill town, had industries, gristmills, sawmills, forges, distilleries, and more than 20 local textile mills. In 1855, 560 local workers made 2.5 million yards of cloth. Entrepreneurs here innovated the first power looms for woolens, satinet, wool-nylon serge, and other wool synthetic blends, 'wash and wear' fabrics, and latch hook yarn kits. Local factories further refined manufacturing processes and efficiencies which kept textiles alive and thriving, well beyond the great depression period.

Nearly every section of town had its own mill village, complete with mills, shops, housing, farms, and baseball leagues. Hecla was home to the Polish immigrants, Linwood to the French Canadians, and North Uxbridge to the Italian immigrants. Uxbridge Center was the main village nestled between Independence, Prospect and Liberty hills. The Uxbridge Academy and "the Town common" were centerpieces of this central village. The village of Uxbridge attracted Irish immigrants who had worked on the canal. Water power from the Mumford River became the lifeblood of the Center's early industrialization. In 1832, 60 years after Rev. Nathan Webb's death, famous American hymn-writer Lowell Mason, came here and wrote the classical hymn tune "Uxbridge".

Seth Reed's 1777 gristmill at Uxbridge Center served in the 1880s as a gun factory known as "Bay State Arms". John Capron's first ever power looms for woolens made the first cashmere satinets in America beginning in 1820. Ironstone village, in south Uxbridge, had Benjamin Taft's 1734 forge which let Caleb Handy make tools, scythes and guns. William Arnold's 1815 mill Ironstone mill housing remains there today. The village of Hecla had American Woolen, Daniel Day's 1810 woolen mill, and Hilena Lowell's shoe factory. At Wheelockville, the Waucantuck Mill manufactured the first "wash and wear" fabrics. Calumet's (Central Woolen) ran 24/7 making Civil War cloth.

North Uxbridge was home to Richard Sayle's Rivulet Mill, and to Clapp's 1810 Cotton Mill. Blanchard's granite quarry rebuilt Boston after the Great Fire of 1872 and provided New York City with curbs, as well as stones at the base of the Statue of Liberty. Nearby Linwood has a beautiful 1866 Victorian style cotton mill, built by James Whitin. Rogerson's village historic district boasts Robert Rogerson's Crown and Eagle Cotton Mill, considered a masterpiece of early industrial architecture. Today the Crown and Eagle serves as senior housing. Dutch immigrants revitalized large old farms for dairy and corn production in the early 20th century.

John Capron's original mill, downstream in Uxbridge, grew under the leadership of Charles Arthur Root of Uxbridge, and Edward Bachman of New York City, into a large textile complex, the Bachman Uxbridge Worsted Company, with thirteen plants nationwide in four states with over 6,000 workers. It was locally instrumental in the manufacture of military uniforms and clothing, and also reached the top in the women's fashion industry. A 1953 Time Magazine article said the mill, now under the leadership of Charles Root's son-in-law, Harold Walter, the Bachman-Uxbridge Worsted Company, led New England's textile industry by research into blended fabrics and wool-nylon "serge". Civil War, World War I, World War II Army and nurse corps uniforms, the first Air Force uniform, "Uxbridge 1683 Blue", and "latch hook kits" were made here. President Franklin D. Roosevelt personally wrote to thank management and workers for extraordinary efforts in the war effort. Uxbridge mills were allowed to fly special Army and Navy "E" flags for excellence in wartime production. It was later known as America's third largest yarn mill, the Bernat Mill.

== Photos ==
Seth Read's original water works building on Mumford River served as a 1777 grist mill, and an 1880s gun factory for single shot rifles, known as Bay State Arms. Today it houses a liquor store

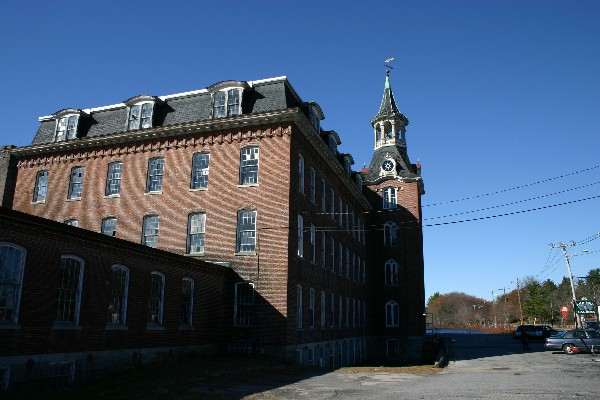
Linwood Cotton Mill, built by James F. Whitin (1866). The Blackstone Valley was a major contributor to America's Industrial Revolution.

Mumford River falls (seen from Alice Bridges Bridge) water powered early Uxbridge mills

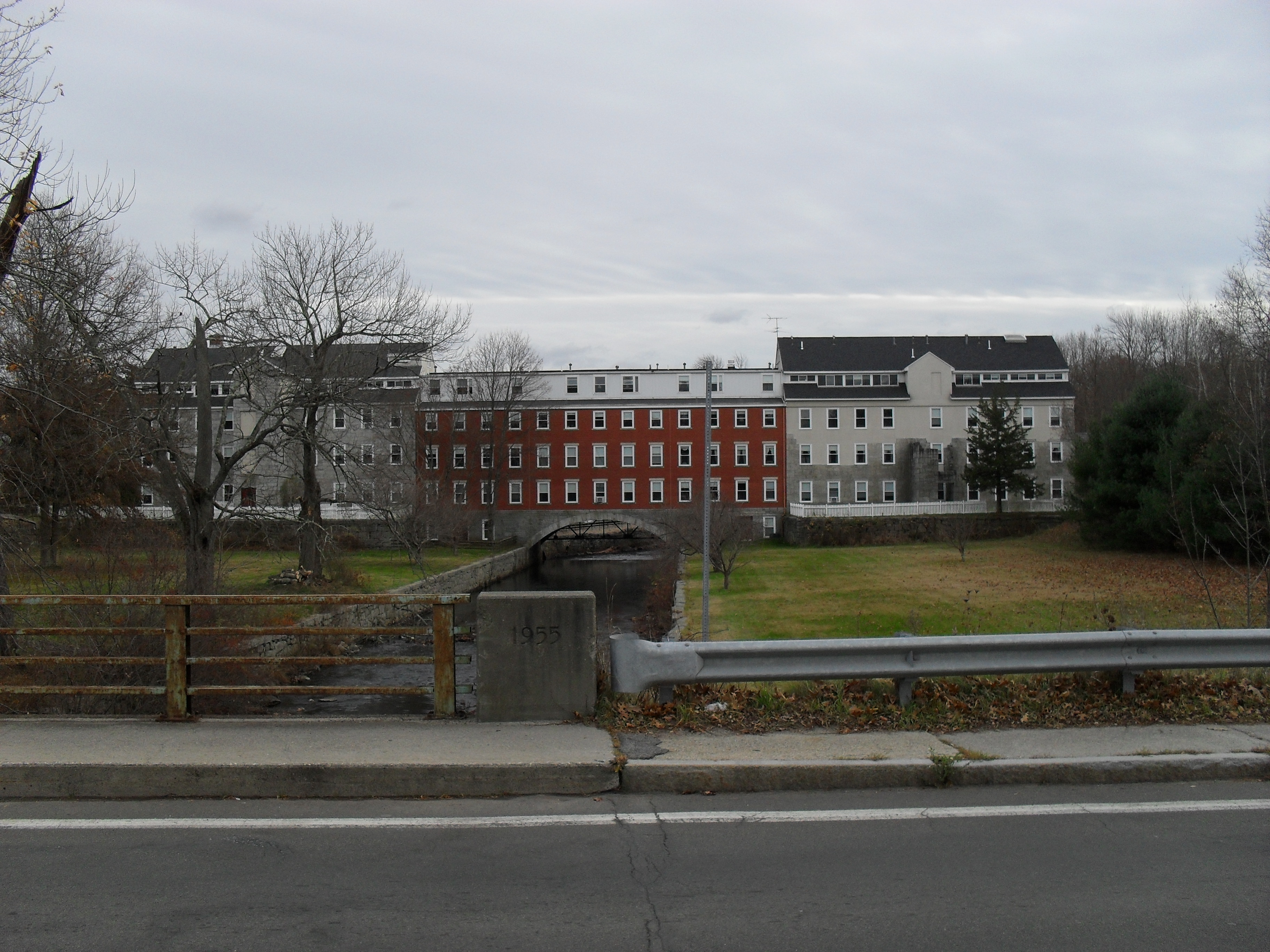
Crown & Eagle Mill, Uxbridge, MA, considered a masterpiece of early American Industrial architecture. The Blackstone Valley was a major contributor to America's Industrial Revolution.

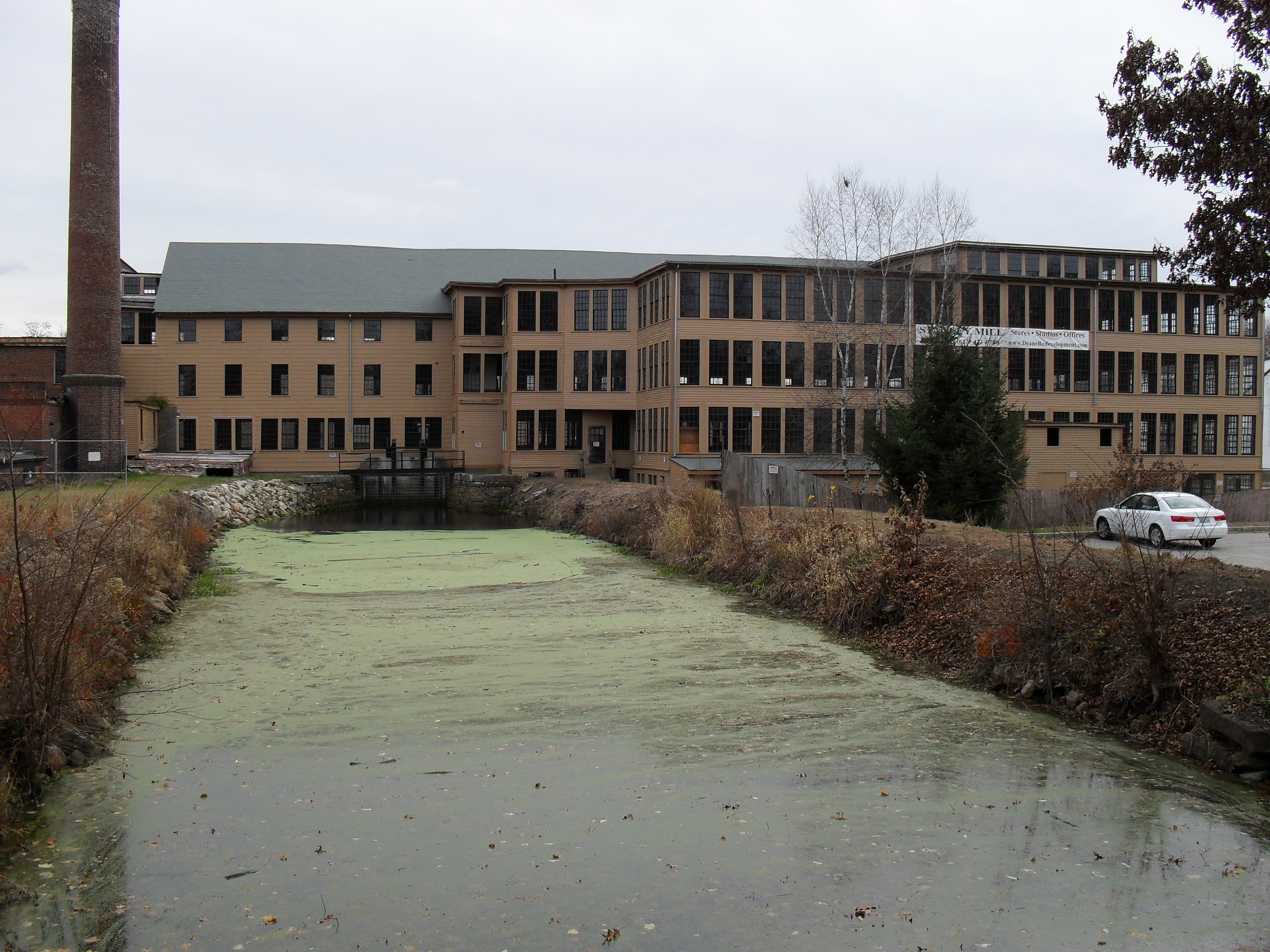
Stanely Woolen Mill, Nov. 11, 2009, Uxbridge, MA, with view of the Blackstone Canal

Mill worker housing, Ironstone Cotton Manufacturing Company, built 1814

The Capron mill, built by John Capron Sr. and his sons Effingham, and John, circa 1820, at Uxbridge, Massachusetts. The mill manufactured the first satinets, used the first power looms for woolens in America, and made US military uniforms for over 140 years.

=== Mid-20th century to present ===
The late 20th century was marked by state and national parks developed around historic mills. Large mill fires signaled the end of local textiles which had declined since the Great Depression. Production from local mills ended, rivers were restored, and community renewal followed. The Great Gatsby (1974) and Oliver's Story (1978) were filmed locally including Stanley Woolen Mill.

The National Heritage Corridor contains the 1,000-acre (4.0 km^{2}) Blackstone Canal Heritage State Park, 9 miles (14 km) of the Blackstone River Bikeway, the Southern New England Trunkline Trail, and West Hill Dam Army Corps wildlife refuge. 60 Federalist homes add to 54 National, and 375 state-listed historic sites, including Georgian Elmshade, and other historic architectural styles.

A 2007 fire of epic proportions destroyed the 400,000-square-foot (37,000 m^{2}) Bernat Mill, 500 jobs, and 65 businesses. [note: link not available without member account] The local fire department, located one block away, responded immediately at 4:30 am on July 21, 2007. The ten-alarm fire quickly overwhelmed local resources, requiring a fire-fighting response from two states and 66 local fire departments. The fire burned for days. The original historic wooden mill of John and Effingham Capron was preserved by fire fighters. The Fire Marshal traced the fire to a welding company and failed sprinklers.

== Photos ==
Bernat Mill, post 2007 fire, November 11, 2009, at Uxbridge, Massachusetts

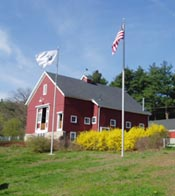
River Bend Farm Interpretive Center at Blackstone River and Canal Heritage State Park in Blackstone River Valley National Heritage Corridor
