= Nathan Webb (minister) =

American Congregational Church minister (1705–1772)

- Born: April 9, 1705; Braintree, Massachusetts Colony, British America
- Died: March 17, 1772 (aged 66); Uxbridge, Massachusetts Colony, British America
- Occupations: Pastor, First New Congregational Church in the Great Awakening period
- Spouse: Ruth Adams of Braintree
- Children: One daughter, Elizabeth Webb
- Parent(s): Benjamin Webb and Susanna Ballentine

Nathan Webb (April 9, 1705 – March 17, 1772), an early-American Congregational Church minister.

== Early life ==
He was born in Braintree, Norfolk County, Massachusetts, to Benjamin Webb (1667–1739) and Susanna Ballentine.

He married Ruth Adams in Braintree on November 23, 1731. His nephew became President John Adams. John Adams recorded in his diary a visit in Uxbridge with his uncle Nathan Webb in March 1756. it is reported by local historians that Nathan Webb held several slaves.

== Career ==
Webb was the first called minister of the new Congregational Church in the newly incorporated (1727) Town of Uxbridge. The Uxbridge Congregational Church was officially split from the church at Mendon, Massachusetts. Webb was called on January 6, 1731. This church was the first church to be built in the new town of Uxbridge.

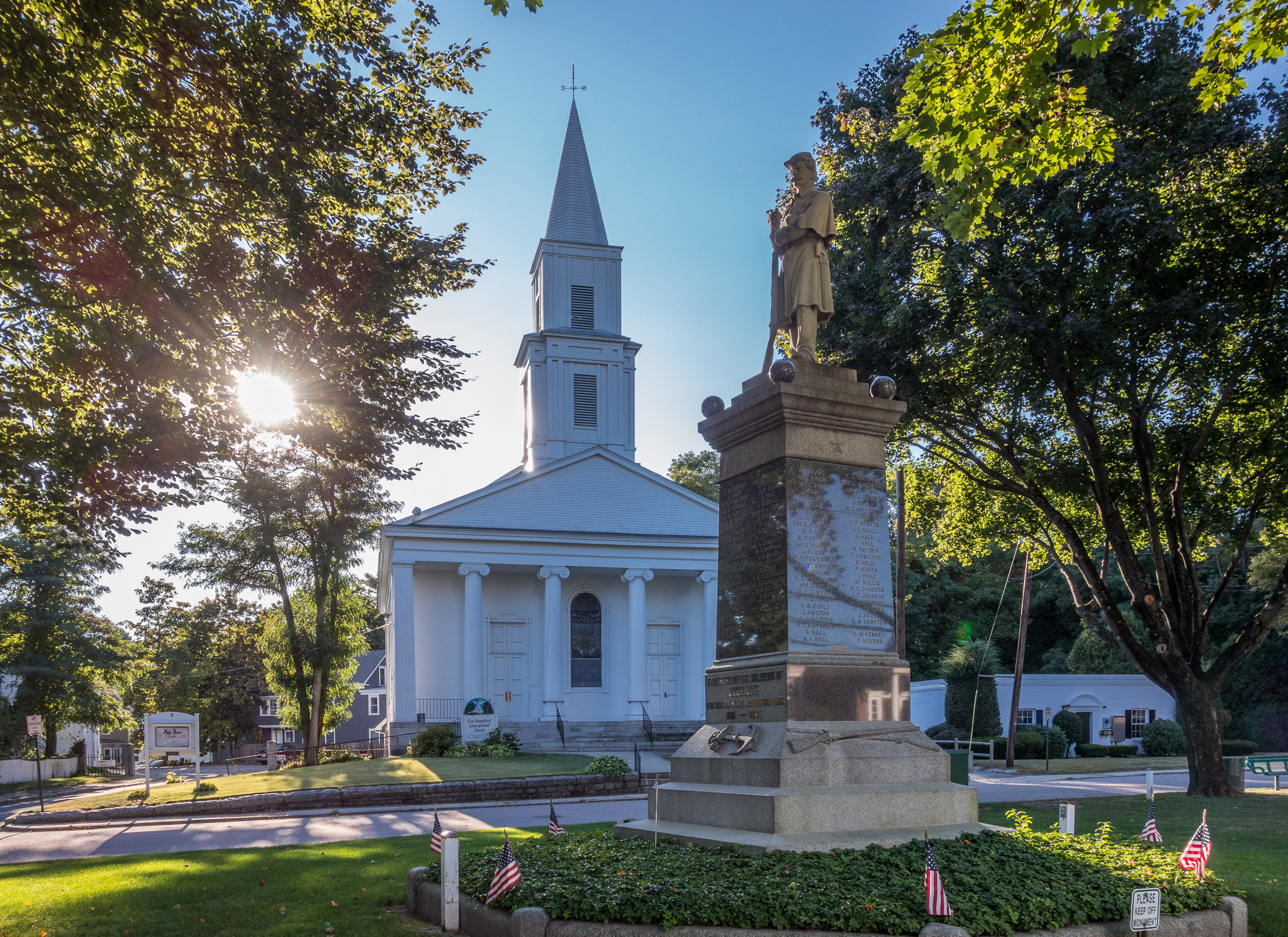
Congregational Church, 1731, first new Congregational Church in Massachusetts during the Great Awakening period

Webb was ordained at the Uxbridge First Congregational Church, then within Suffolk County, on February 3, 1731. The Uxbridge church is the first to be mentioned in a list of 45 new Congregational churches in New England which were started in the decade beginning in 1731. The churches of this period were attributed by the text cited below to the Great Awakening, an early American historical religious movement that sprang up in the Connecticut River Valley, led by ministers such as Jonathan Edwards, another Congregational minister.

Shortly after Webb's ordination, the new town of Uxbridge became part of a newly established Worcester County.

Members of his congregation included America's first woman voter, Lydia Taft; and Lt. Col. Seth Read, who fought at Bunker Hill, was instrumental in adding E Pluribus Unum to U.S. coins, and founded Erie, Pennsylvania. Many members of the early-American Taft family were members of Webb's congregation. Peter Rawson Taft's son, Alfonso, started the Ohio family branch which rose to prominence in American politics. Deacon John Hall and Sarah had four children. Their son Baxter Hall drummed the first musters in the American Revolution.

Young Samuel Spring was mentored closely by Webb. Spring, born 1746, became a Revolutionary War chaplain. Shortly after Webb's death, Spring served in the Siege of Boston and the Invasion of Canada (1775). Spring later founded the Massachusetts Missionary Society and the Andover Theological Seminary. Spring has many published sermons and works to his credit. He was considered a Congregationalist fundamentalist. He had trained under Webb and later at the Princeton Theological Seminary in Princeton, New Jersey.

Webb spent his entire career in the ministry at Uxbridge, spanning over 41 years of service.

It appears that Webb and his ministry was the longest to ever serve this parish. Some early histories of the town record the prominence of this church and the role that he and the church played in this new pioneer community. His ministry spanned the pre-Revolutionary War period of Uxbridge, in the Province of Massachusetts Bay.

== Death and afterwards ==
Webb served in Uxbridge until his death there at the age of 66. The Worcester County history text reports that he "continued in the faithful service of the Master" until his death.

He bequeathed "16 British Sterling Pounds to the church for the purposes of purchasing 3 silver cups to be engraved with the names of Nathan Webb, Ruth Webb, and Elizabeth Webb." He then bequeathed 26 Pounds, 13 Shillings, and 4 cents (N. B. Webb's estate was in total much more than the 24 pounds Sterling paid to the Nipmuc for the original land deed to the entire 8 Mile by 8 mile square plantation granted to settlers in 1662 for what became Mendon and other towns) (N.B. Adjusting for an assumed 2% annual inflation, the 24 pounds paid to the Nipmuc in 1662 would have been worth roughly 212 pounds when Webb made his will 110 years later, five times Webb's enumerated estate, which doesn't make the original transaction right per se but places it in proper context) to be invested and improved forever toward the work of the learned, pious and orthodox Congregational ministry of said church forever". The title of the sermon given on his death was, "The godly fathers and a defence to their people [electronic resource"] : A sermon delivered at Uxbridge, April 19, 1772, occasioned by the death of the late Reverend Nathan Webb, Pastor of said church and people: containing a summary of his character. : And now published, at the desire of many of the hearers, to revive and perpetuate the memory of their said pastor. / By Ebenezer Chaplin, A.M. Pastor of a church in Sutton."

Webb's funeral was held on April 19, 1772, exactly three years before the Battles of Lexington and Concord.

The present location of the Congregational Church, in the Uxbridge Common District, changed from the 1830s due to a split with the more liberal Unitarian Church tradition.

== Quakers come to town ==
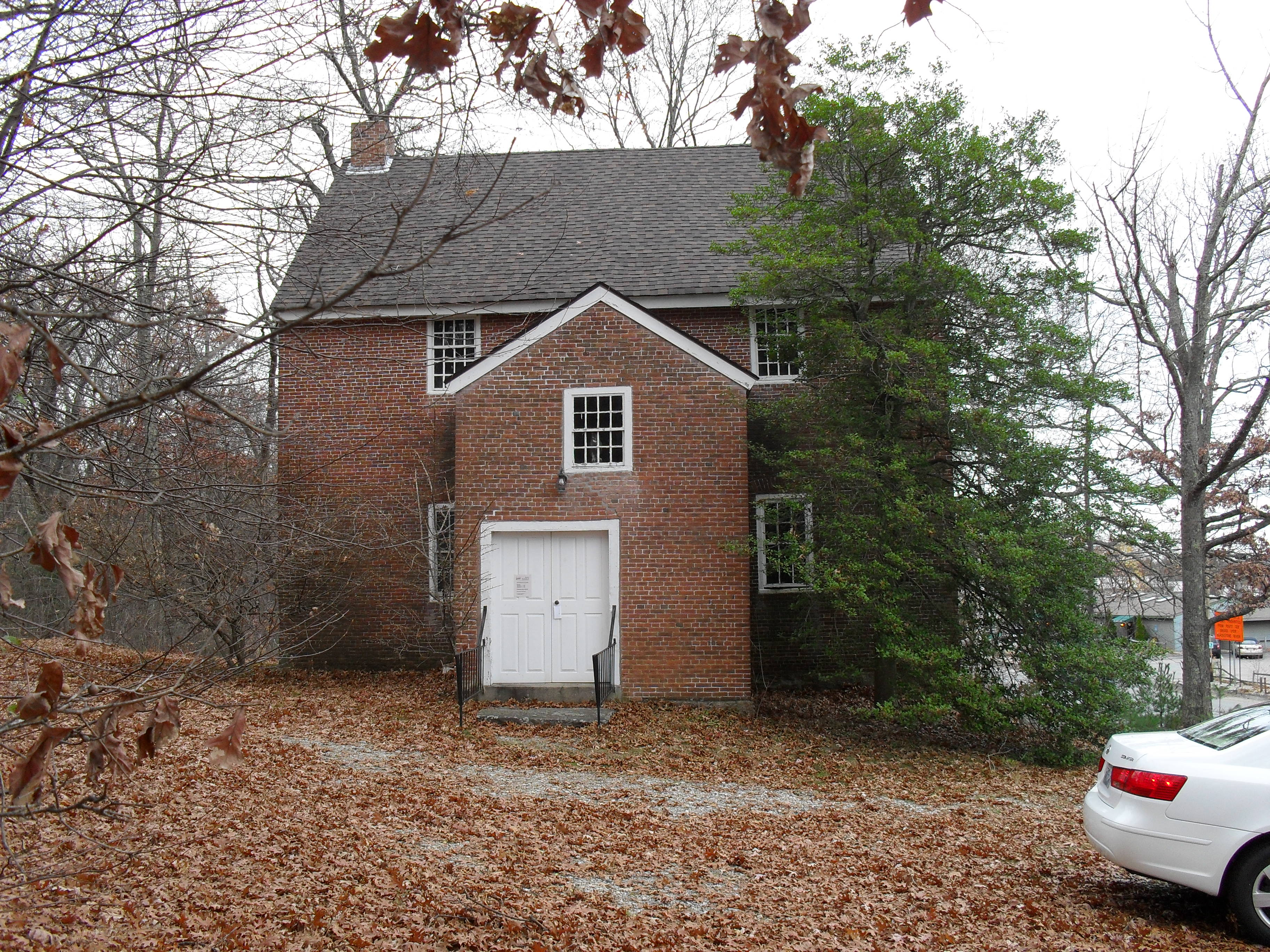
Friends Meetinghouse (1770), Quaker Highway at Massachusetts Route 98, Uxbridge, Massachusetts

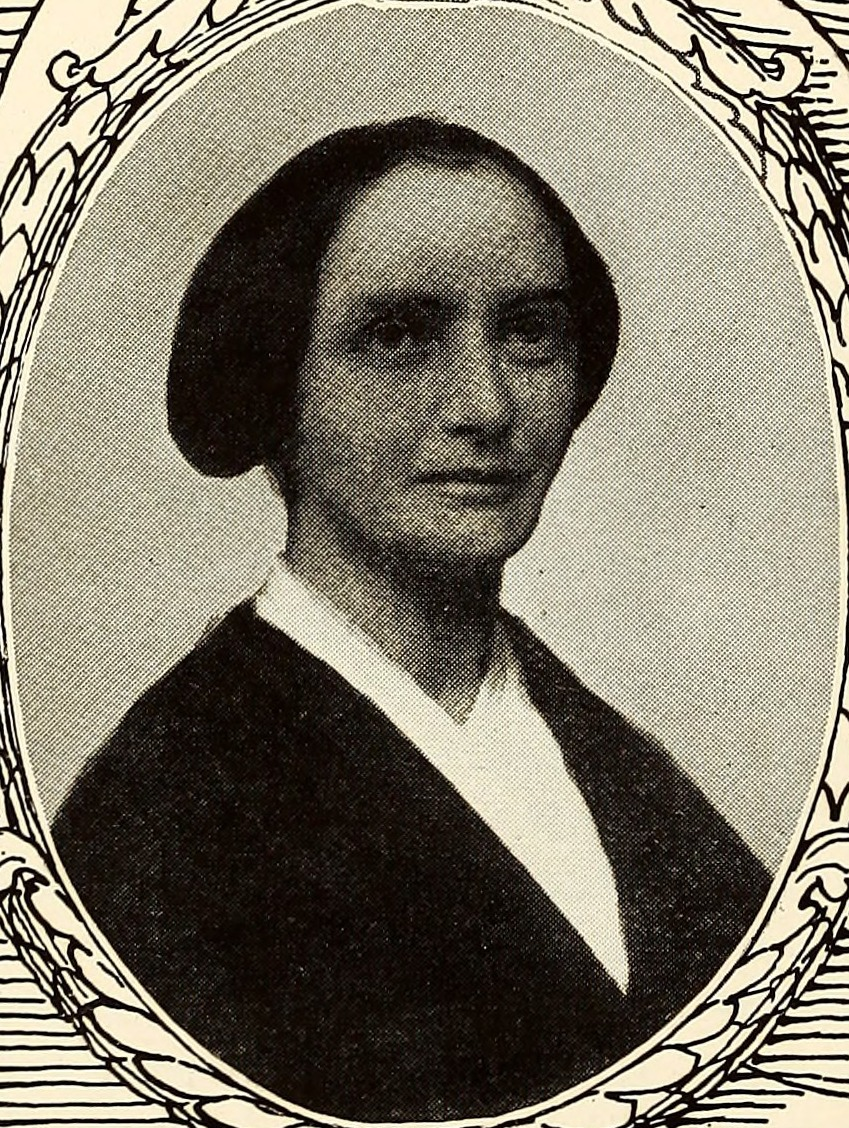
Abby Kelley Foster, of the Friend's Meeting-house

Three years before Webb's death, Rhode Island Quaker abolitionists, with ties to Moses Brown, built a local meetinghouse on the outskirts of Uxbridge. The Quakers and the Congregationalists lived peacefully together and both supported the abolition movement, although Rev. Webb and Deacon Read owned slaves around 1754. This was among the first Quaker meetings in Massachusetts after their expulsion, in the 1600s by Puritans (later known as Congregationalists).

Abby Kelley Foster, a later radical abolitionist, and her family were members of the Friends Meetinghouse at Uxbridge up until at least 1841. She led Lucy Stone and Susan B. Anthony into the abolition movements. Many houses in Uxbridge later served as part of the Underground Railroad.

Key Quakers at early Uxbridge included Richard Mowry, Abby Kelley and Effingham Capron. Quiet Quakers, who carried the heart of their faith into their vocations, worked side by side with the descendants of legalistic Puritans, known as Congregationalists, to lead major social reforms and industry in their new nation.

Concerns for women's rights and human rights were among the legacies of the early religious traditions at Uxbridge. The American hymn writer Lowell Mason, of Medford, Massachusetts, came to Uxbridge, sixty years after Webb's death, and wrote the classical hymn tune "Uxbridge", one of 1,600 hymns composed by Mason. It appears that the Webb's ministry helped to begin a lasting religious legacy in this part of the Blackstone Valley.

== Significance in American history ==
Webb pastored the first new Congregational Church in Massachusetts, started during the Great Awakening period for over 41 years. His parishioners made a mark on America and its early freedoms. The eulogy of his death was given by Reverend Ebeneezer Chaplin, of the church at Sutton, Massachusetts, to embody the character of Webb for posterity. The sermon was delivered exactly three years before the Lexington Alarm. Young Baxter Hall of this church answered the Lexington Alarm as a drummer in the first muster of the American Revolution.

== See also ==
- List of people from Uxbridge, Massachusetts
