= Perry Avenue Historic District =

Historic district in Massachusetts, United States

- U.S. National Register of Historic Places
- U.S. Historic district
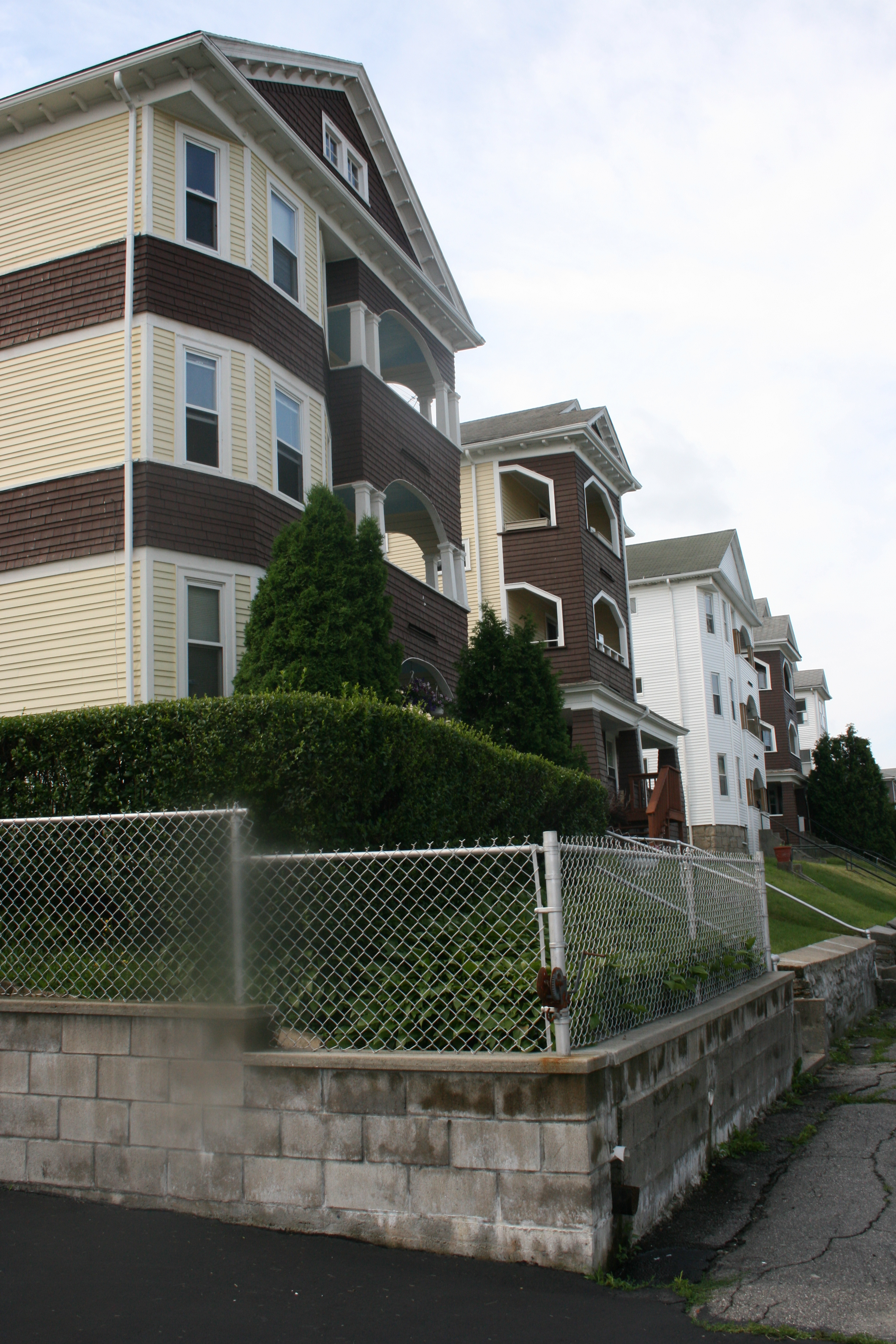

- Location within Massachusetts Location within the United States
- Location: 49–55 Perry Ave., Worcester, Massachusetts
- Coordinates: 42°14′53″N 71°47′54″W
- Area: less than one acre
- Built: 1930
- Architectural style: Colonial Revival, Bungalow/Craftsman
- MPS: Worcester Three-Deckers TR
- NRHP reference No.: 89002367
- Added to NRHP: February 9, 1990

The Perry Avenue Historic District is a historic district in Worcester, Massachusetts. It includes four well-preserved triple-decker houses that were built in the late 1920s at the base of Vernon Hill, representing one of the last phases of development in that area. The district was listed on the National Register of Historic Places in 1990.

== Description and history ==
Perry Avenue, a predominantly residential street, is located in southeastern Worcester, running parallel to and east of Interstate 290, roughly between Massachusetts Route 122A and Massachusetts Route 146. The four buildings that make up this district are located on the east side of the street, about midway between Seymour and Stone Streets.

All four buildings are wood frame structures, three stories in height, and have gable roofs and a combination of clapboard and wooden shingle siding. All have an overhanging front gable that is fully pedimented, with modillions in the eave and raking edges. Their fronts are divided into two sections, one a projecting bay window stack rising the full height, and the other a stack of porches. On two of the buildings, 51 and 55 Perry, the porches project and are set under a separate gable, while those of 49 and 54 are recessed under the main gable. The recessed porches are supported by grouped columns, while the projecting porches have shingled supports, and extend on the first level across the building width.

These houses were built about 1928, during Worcester's last period of triple decker construction. This area, located lower on the slopes of Vernon Hill, was developed as infill in an area originally populated by Irish immigrants; these new buildings were at first owned and occupied primarily by Polish and Lithuanian immigrants.

== See also ==
- National Register of Historic Places listings in eastern Worcester, Massachusetts
