= Coronet John Farnum Jr. House =

Historic house in Massachusetts, United States

- U.S. National Register of Historic Places
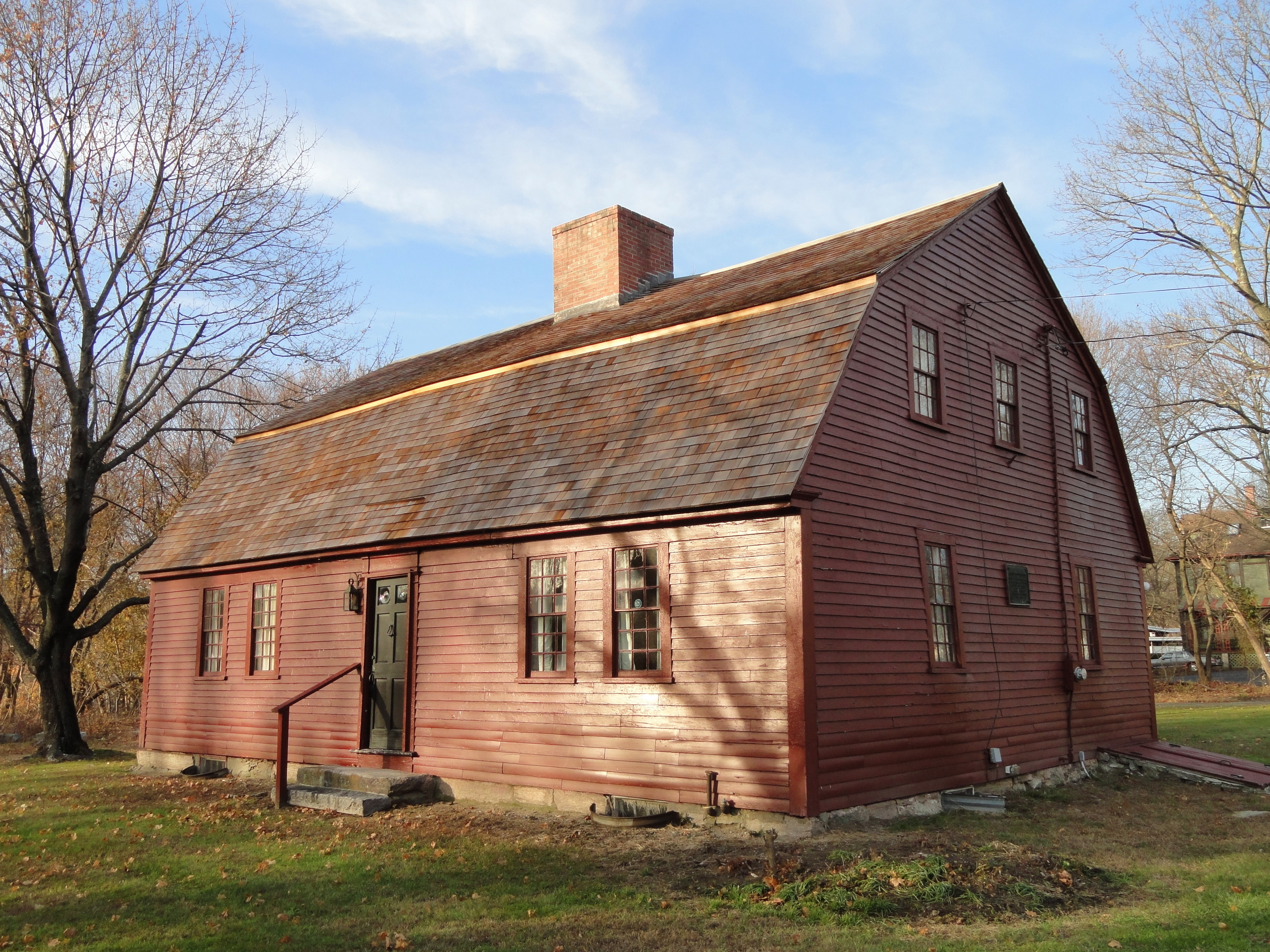

- Location within Massachusetts Location within the United States
- Location: Mendon St., Uxbridge, Massachusetts
- Coordinates: 42°04′39″N 71°37′38″W
- Area: Less than 1 acre (0.40 ha)
- Built: 1710
- NRHP reference No.: 80001682
- Added to NRHP: May 7, 1980

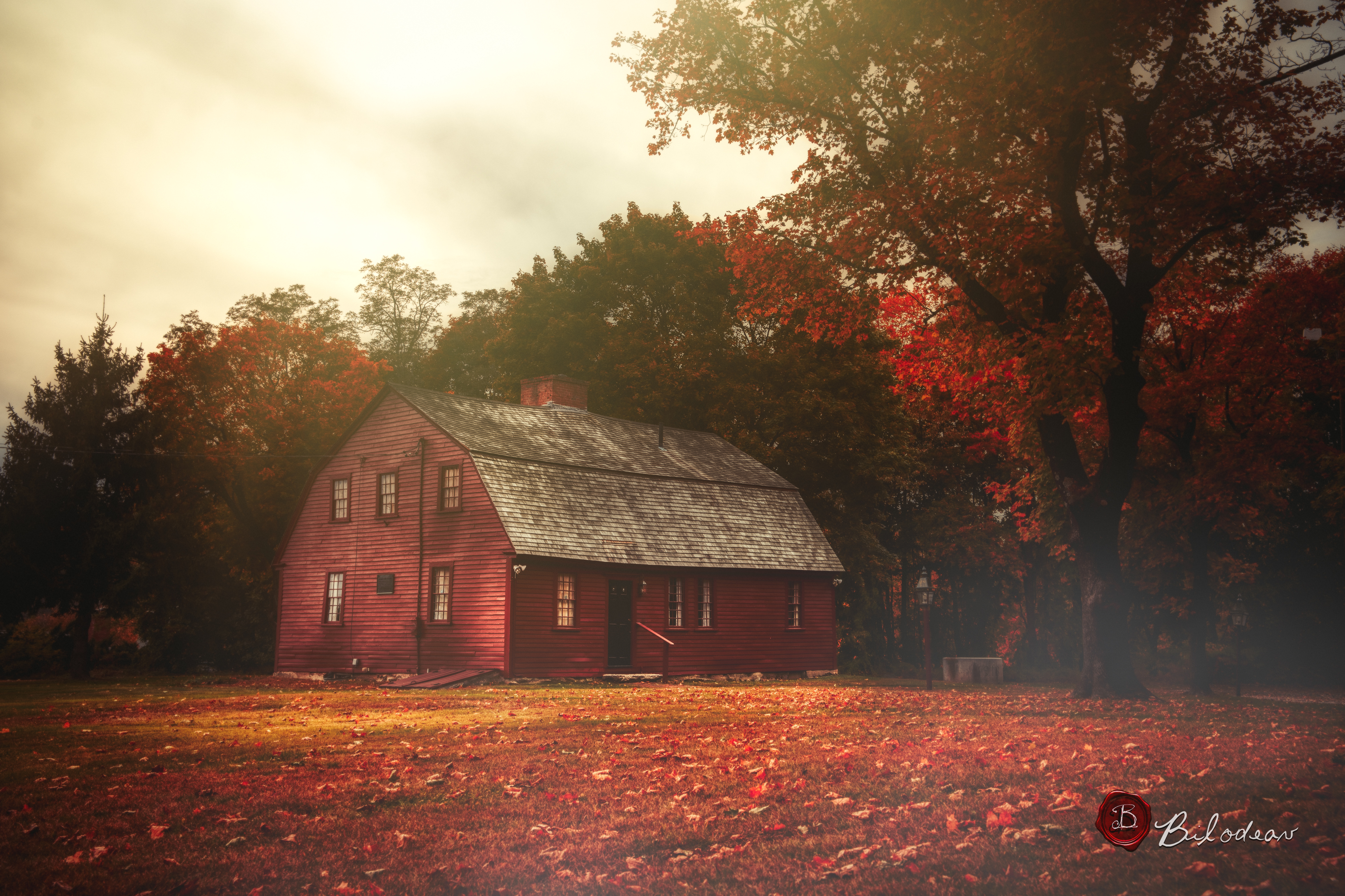
John Farnum House, 2019 by Chris Bilodeau Photography

The Coronet John Farnum Jr. House, built circa 1710, is one of the oldest homes in the historic Blackstone Valley town of Uxbridge, Massachusetts. On May 7, 1980, it was added to the National Register of Historic Places.

== The house and its historic significance ==
Uxbridge is in the heart of the Blackstone River Valley National Heritage Corridor, which is the oldest industrialized region in the United States. The Coronet John Farnum Jr. House was the site of the first Uxbridge Town Meeting in 1727. The house today is a museum and headquarters of the Uxbridge Historical Society. It is an excellent example of early New England colonial architecture.

== Builder and original owner ==
John and Mary (Tyler) Farnum may have moved to the Chockalog section of Uxbridge, then Mendon because of the "witchcraft controversies" that involved Mary's family in Andover. John Farnum Jr. was a "coronet", a now obsolete military position similar to an ensign. He was elected a constable in Mendon in 1703. He had his house built about 1710 in a part of Mendon that is now Uxbridge. Son Moses Farnum's house still stands on Massachusetts Route 146A.

== Separation of Uxbridge ==
On June 27, 1727, a petition was granted to form the town of Uxbridge. The first town meeting was held in the Coronet John Farnum House. One of the first official acts of the town on July 8, 1728, was to appropriate funds for "ÿe good rum for ye raising of ye meeting house.".

== Significance in early American history ==
The significance of the house, the town, and Coronet John Farnum Jr. are now linked to American history as part of the Blackstone River Valley National Heritage Corridor.

== See also ==
- National Register of Historic Places listings in Uxbridge, Massachusetts
- List of the oldest buildings in Massachusetts
- List of the oldest buildings in the United States
