= Friends Meetinghouse (Uxbridge, Massachusetts) =

Historic church in Massachusetts, United States

- U.S. National Register of Historic Places
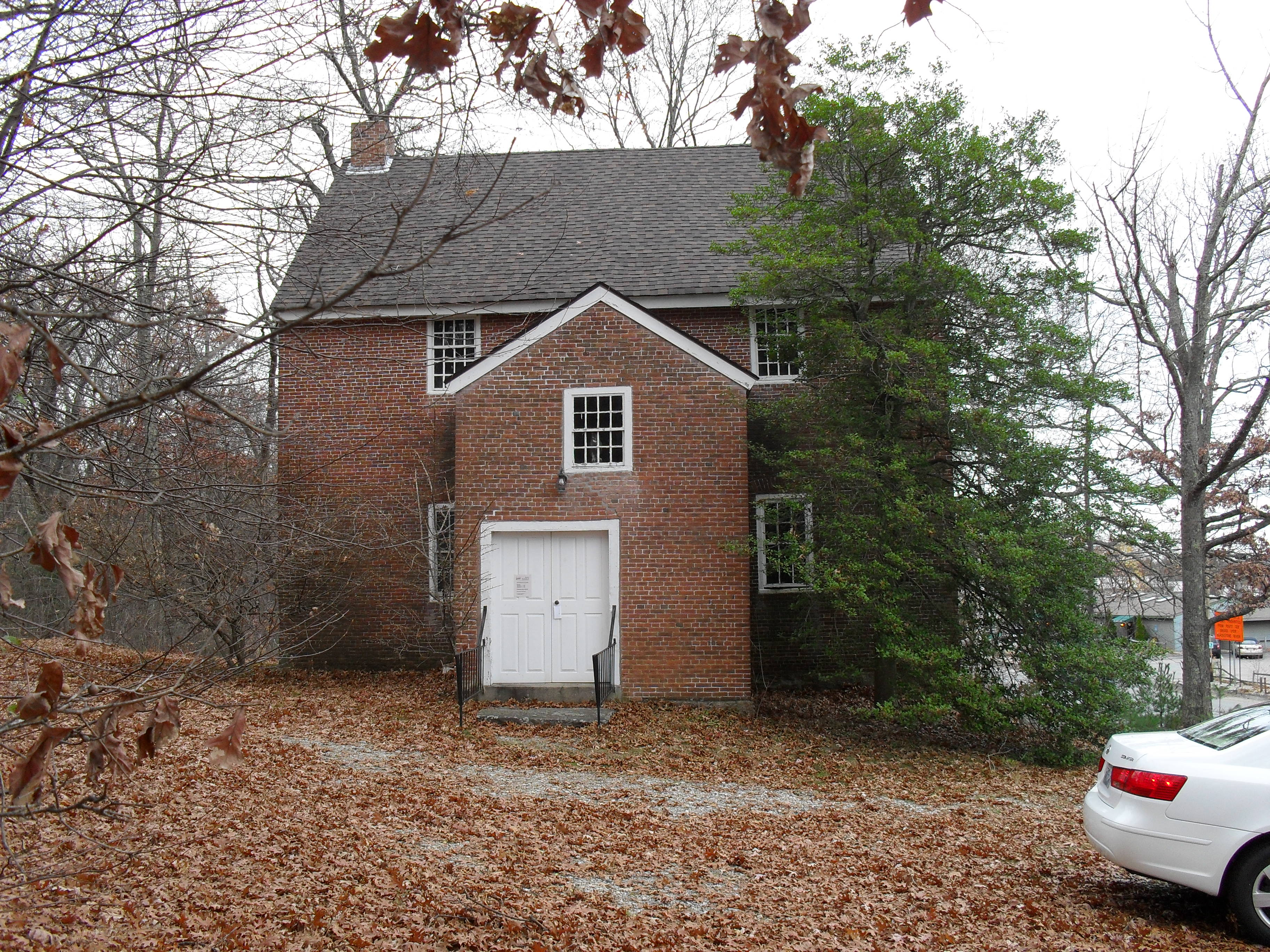
- Friends Meeting House, Uxbridge, MA, 1770, Route 146A and Route 98; National Register of Historic Places

- Location within Massachusetts Location within the United States
- Nearest city: Uxbridge, Massachusetts
- Coordinates: 42°2′21″N 71°37′16″W
- Area: 2 acres (0.81 ha)
- Built: 1770
- NRHP reference No.: 74000395
- Added to NRHP: January 24, 1974

The Friends Meetinghouse is an historic Friends meeting house of the Religious Society of Friends (Quakers) located at the junction of Routes 146A (Quaker Highway) and 98 (Aldrich Street) in Uxbridge, Massachusetts. On January 24, 1974, it was added to the National Register of Historic Places.

== History ==
The Friends Meeting House is one of the last crude brick church structures remaining in America. This building is on the National Registry of Historic Buildings. The Friends Meeting House was built in Uxbridge, Massachusetts in 1770, by Quakers from the Quaker Community in Smithfield, Rhode Island. It was built on the farm of Moses Farnum, circa 1769, from bricks made from a brickyard across the street. The structure is two stories and has a balcony. In the Quaker tradition there were separate entrances and meeting places for men and women. The "Quaker City" settlement is one of the earliest resettlements of Quakers into the Massachusetts Colony following their expulsion by the Puritans in the 17th century.

Friends Meeting house is a brick, two-story house with a rectangular gabled roof at 479 Quaker Hwy.

== Rhode Island Quakers, Abby Kelley Foster, Effingham Capron ==
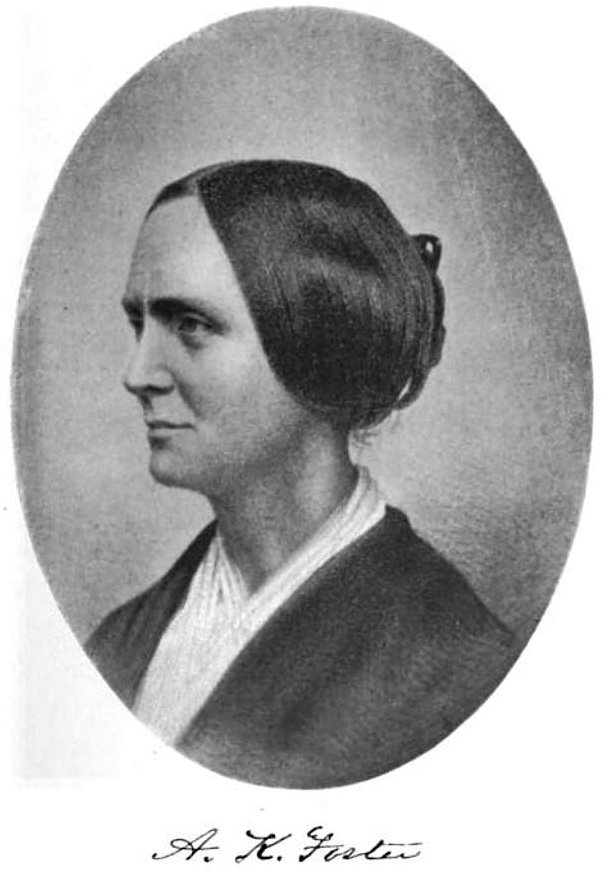
Abby Kelley Foster, of Friend's Meeting House, led Susan B. Anthony to abolitionism

Quakers and others from Rhode Island and Massachusetts maintain this building. One of the founding members of this church was the Mowry family of Rhode Island. Richard Mowry was an influential member at Quaker City who constructed machines to manufacture woolens and cotton, thus becoming a pioneer in the American industrial revolution. He was a devout Quaker who traveled throughout the Northeastern US carrying his gospel far and wide. Mowry had other inventions to his credit and is viewed as an early pioneer of the Industrialization of the very early textile industrial center at Uxbridge from the time of the American Revolution.

This historic church was the church home for fiery abolitionist, Abby Kelley Foster. She was an ultra-abolitionist who led Susan B. Anthony and Lucy Stone into the abolition movement. She was later disowned in 1841, by the Uxbridge Meeting for radical abolition speeches to mixed gender audiences.

At least one other Nationally known anti-slavery champion belonged to the Uxbridge meeting. Effingham Capron was an ardent anti-slavery advocate who led the movement at Uxbridge (450 local members) and served as Vice President of the State and National anti-slavery societies. Effingham brought key leaders to speak in Uxbridge in the 1830s and was widely known for his anti-slavery efforts and for his active work as a "liberator" by housing slaves on the underground railroad. Effingham was the local mill owner of the Capron mill and Uxbridge was an important junction (the canal towpath and later railroad with the turnpike from Connecticut and points south) for slaves making their way to the free African communities in the Blackstone Valley and Worcester. The Worcester area was a hotbed for the anti-slavery movement and the Quaker Meeting House was a nodal point in this activity.

The earliest Quakers who settled here from Smithfield and Providence, RI, were among the first in America who personally renounced slavery and freed slaves. The early Quakers here were related to the religious group of Moses Brown, who helped found Brown University. There are a number of Quaker homes built in this area, which was known as Quaker City, Aldrich Village, and the village of Ironstone, Massachusetts. The cemetery at this location is also a source of history. This church, listed in the Vital Records of Uxbridge as C.R. 4, church records 4, records the death of various members of the Arnold family of Uxbridge. "Sarah Arnold", widow of Benedict, died at the age of 83 on February 14, 1836 according to the Uxbridge vital records. It was believed that Peggy Shippen, the second wife of General Benedict Arnold, the Revolutionary War general and infamous traitor, returned from England to Uxbridge, incognito. She may have returned to her roots in the Quaker tradition at this Friend's Meetinghouse, following her upbringing as a Quaker in Philadelphia.

An almshouse cemetery nearby was relocated with the Route 146 construction between 1981–1984 and resulted in historic archeology findings published by Boston University researchers.

== See also ==
- National Register of Historic Places listings in Uxbridge, Massachusetts
