= Moses Farnum House =

Historic house in Massachusetts, United States

- U.S. National Register of Historic Places
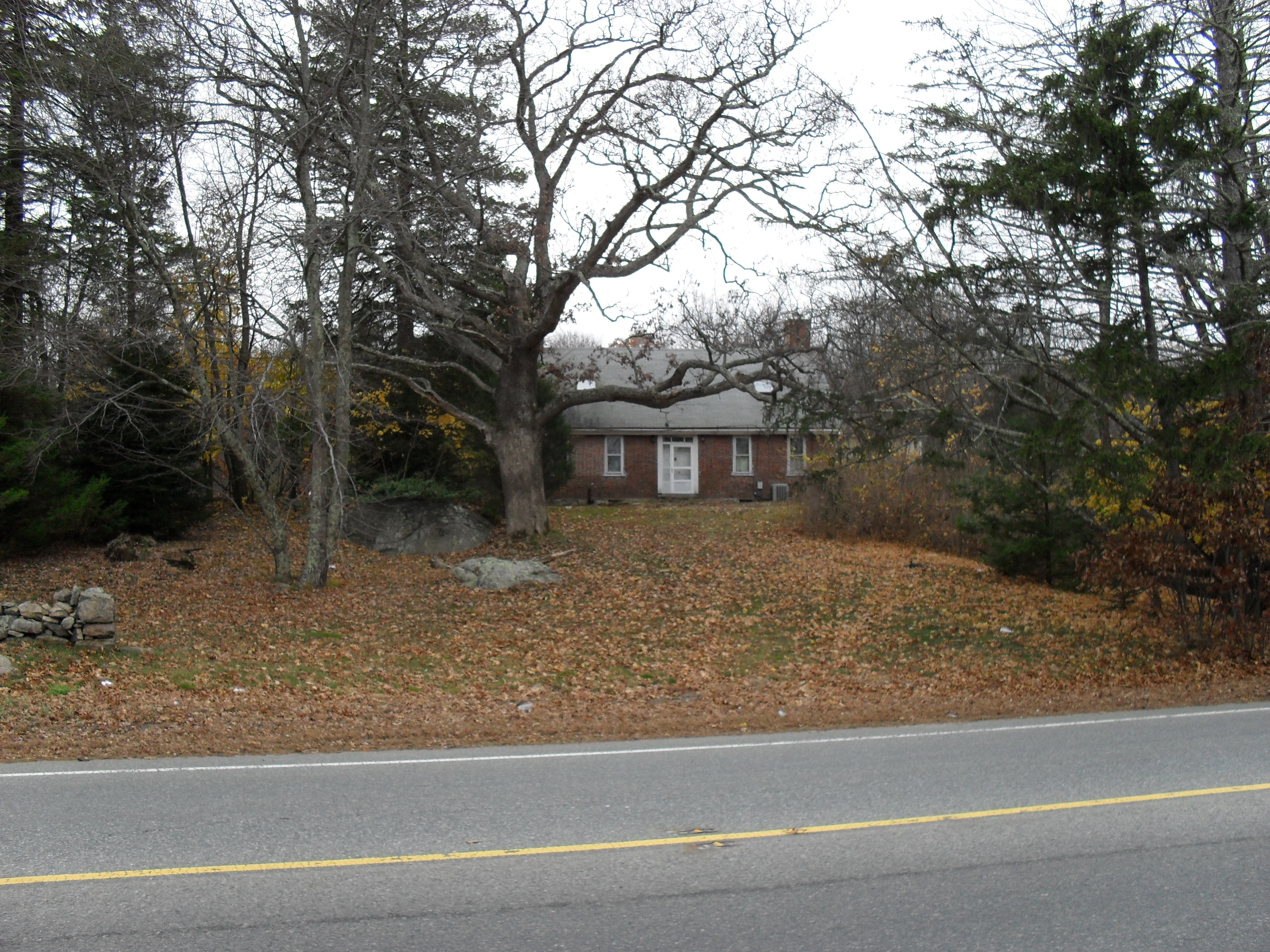

- Location within Massachusetts Location within the United States
- Location: Uxbridge, Massachusetts
- Coordinates: 42°2′27″N 71°37′20″W
- Built: 1766
- Architectural style: Georgian
- MPS: Uxbridge MRA
- NRHP reference No.: 83004118
- Added to NRHP: October 7, 1983

The Moses Farnum House is an historic house located on Route 146A. in Uxbridge, Massachusetts. On October 7, 1983, it was added to the National Register of Historic Places.

== History ==
Moses Farnum was born, son of John C. Farnum, Jr of Chockalog(Nipmuc "for dry fox place or burned place") at Uxbridge (then Mendon), Massachusetts Colony, on September 8, 1701, and died September 8, 1770. He was a farmer in Uxbridge and Douglas. Moses Farnum's descendant, EB Farnum, became Mayor of and was a pioneer at Deadwood, South Dakota. Moses Farnum was a prominent landowner in the pre-Revolutionary War era of Colonial Massachusetts. The site of the Moses Farnum farm and house became the site of a Quaker meeting house circa 1770. The house was also used as Uxbridge's first post office. Quakers from Smithfield, Rhode Island, abolitionists, with ties to Moses Brown whose family had founded Brown University, and some of whom were among the first in America to free slaves, settled here. Moses Farnum's father, John C. Farnum, Jr., who died in 1749 is also buried in the Quaker Cemetery at this site.

== See also ==
- National Register of Historic Places listings in Uxbridge, Massachusetts
