= Massachusetts Route 98 =

State highway in Worcester County, Massachusetts, US

Route 98
- Route 98 highlighted in red

Route information
- Maintained by MassDOT
- Length: 3.87 mi (6.23 km)

Major junctions
- South end: Route 98 at the Rhode Island state line near Harrisville, RI
- North end: Route 146A in Uxbridge

Location
- Country: United States
- State: Massachusetts
- Counties: Worcester

Highway system
- Massachusetts State Highway System; Interstate; US; State
← Route 97	→ Route 99

Route 98 is a 3.87-mile-long (6.23 km) southwest-northeast numbered highway in central Massachusetts. The highway runs from the Rhode Island state line north to Route 146A in Uxbridge.

== Route description ==
The route passes through Aldrich Village, crossing the Douglas Pike and passing a number of buildings on the National Historic Register. One of the historic buildings is the Friends Meetinghouse which is at the northern terminus of Route 98. Nationally prominent Abolitionists Abby Kelley Foster and Effingham Capron were members here. The Southern New England Trunkline Trail crosses Route 98 a short distance south of the Quaker Meeting house and the junction with Route 146A.

Route 98 passes under Route 146 without junction shortly before its northern end at Route 146A, between Exits 1 and 2 of Route 146. The entire route in Massachusetts takes only 3.87 miles (6.23 km).

== Major intersections ==
The entire route is in Uxbridge, Worcester County.

mi	km	Destinations	Notes
0.00	0.00	Route 98 south – Harrisville, Pascoag	Continuation into Rhode Island
0.50	0.80	To Route 7 south	Access via Douglas Pike; To Route 16 and Route 96 via north at Douglas
3.87	6.23	Route 146A	Northern terminus; To Route 146
1.000 mi = 1.609 km; 1.000 km = 0.621 mi: Closed/former

== See also ==
- List of Registered Historic Places in Uxbridge, Massachusetts
