= Richard Mowry =

American textile pioneer (1748–1835)

- Born: February 11, 1748; Smithfield, Rhode Island Colony
- Died: January 24, 1835 (aged 86); Uxbridge, Massachusetts, U.S.
- Occupations: Textile pioneer at Uxbridge, cider press builder, carriage maker, farmer, house carpenter, Quaker preacher
- Known for: Designed, made and marketed early textile manufacturing equipment; farmer
- Spouse(s): Huldah Harris, and two other spouses
- Children: Eight

Richard Mowry (February 11, 1748 – January 24, 1835) became an Uxbridge farmer, in Worcester County, Massachusetts, United States who "successfully built and marketed equipment to manufacture woolen, linen or cotton cloth", from around the time of the Revolution.

== Family ==
Richard Mowry was born as a fifth generation descendant into a family that was prominent during the 17th and 18th century in southern New England: Rhode Island, Massachusetts, and Connecticut. His family had a deed from the Native Americans dating from 1666. There is a book written about Richard Mowry of Uxbridge, Massachusetts and his descendants, written by his great-grandson, a prolific American historical writer, William Augustus Mowry. The original family deed alludes to Roger Williams, John Brown, Edward Inman and John Sayles, early prominent Rhode Islanders. Nathaniel and John Mowry appear to be the first Mowry settlers in the Providence township around 1671.

Richard Mowry was born in Smithfield, on Feb. 11, 1748 to Attorney Joseph Mowry of Glocester, Rhode Island, which at the time bordered Uxbridge. His father died when Mowry was 16, and he learned to be a carpenter at Scituate, Rhode Island.

He married Phebe Smith of Glocester, who died the following year. On January 5, 1774, he married Huldah Harris, daughter of Gideon of Scituate. They had six children. Their first child was born at Scituate in 1775. From 1778 on, the children were born at Uxbridge. Mowry lived in Uxbridge from that point on. Huldah died in 1795 at the age of 50. He married again in 1802, to Isabel Chacc, and had two other children by his third marriage. Isabel died in 1820.

== Quaker roots ==
One can see early connections of the Mowry family to John Brown and Moses Brown at Providence. Moses Brown, who founded Brown University, was an early Quaker and was prominent in the anti-slavery movement in Rhode Island. In 1771 at the age of 22 or 23, Richard Mowry began to attend Friends Meetings in Rhode Island. At that time the Friends meeting from neighboring Smithfield, Rhode Island had extended into South Uxbridge, Massachusetts, just across the colonial line from Glocester and Smithfield. Thus the Mowry family descended from Richard Mowry derived Quaker roots from the time of the Revolution. He formally joined the society on August 25, 1778, and was apparently at the Uxbridge Quaker meeting since his children are all born in that community from that time on. He lived in South Uxbridge for the next 60 years.

== Quaker City ==
The village where the Mowrys lived came to be known as "Quaker City" and is said to be among the earliest places of industrialization in the US. It is part of the historic Blackstone Valley National Heritage Corridor, which is of national significance to the earliest industrialization of the US. There was an iron forge at Ironstone, Massachusetts, just south of Quaker City, started by Benjamin Taft in 1734. Caleb Handy added a triphammer after the American Revolution. The Quakers built buildings from bricks from Moses Farnum's farm. Bog Iron from near the Blackstone River provided the ore for metal working. Grist mills, saw mills, and apparently the earliest textiles from Richard Mowrys marketing and manufactures sprang up nearby. Mowry recorded extensive travels in New England and Central New York, and visited over 88 Quaker meetings, possibly also marketing his inventions for cider or cloth. The reference notes that Richard Mowry was a Quaker preacher and that this tradition and practice shaped early Quaker City and its families. His role as a Quaker preacher was the primary motivation for his extensive travels.

== A farmer and a carpenter ==
In South Uxbridge, he bought the farm of Benjamin Archer, and with his carpenter's trade became highly proficient as a cabinet maker and working with tools. It is no doubt that with this skill set, he was able to build and market the equipment described at the outset to manufacture linens and other materials. He was also a carriage builder and a cider press builder, being an expert with "large wooden screws". The Southwick family, David and Elisha, both Quakers, of South Uxbridge, continued this tradition, and even made Conestoga wagon wheels in the Quaker tradition during the 19th century.

== Death ==
Richard Mowry died at age 86, on January 24, 1835, and is buried at the Friends Meeting House Cemetery (Uxbridge, Massachusetts).
