= Massachusetts Route 146 =

State highway in Worcester County, Massachusetts, US

Route 146
- Map of Worcester County in central Massachusetts with Route 146 highlighted in red

Route information
- Maintained by MassDOT
- Length: 20.99 mi (33.78 km)

Major junctions
- South end: Route 146 at the Rhode Island state line near Millville
- Route 16 / Route 146A in Uxbridge; Route 122A in Millbury; I-90 / Mass Pike / US 20 in Millbury
- North end: I-290 / Cambridge Street / Quinsigamond Avenue in Worcester

Location
- Country: United States
- State: Massachusetts
- Counties: Worcester

Highway system
- Massachusetts State Highway System; Interstate; US; State
← Route 145	→ Route 147

Route 146 is a 20.99-mile (33.78 km) north-south state highway in the U.S. state of Massachusetts, maintained by the Massachusetts Department of Transportation (MassDOT). Spanning approximately 21 miles (34 km) along a south–north axis, it is a continuation of Rhode Island Route 146, which splits from I-95 in Providence. The southern terminus within Massachusetts exists in Millville, where it enters the state from North Smithfield, Rhode Island. Among several local roads, Route 146 intersects with the Massachusetts Turnpike (I-90) in Millbury and I-290 in Worcester before arriving at its northern terminus at the intersection of several surface streets in downtown Worcester. Most of the route is a freeway, except for a short section near the boundary between Millbury and Sutton where there is driveway access and at-grade crossings.

== History ==
During the late 1940s, the then-Massachusetts Department of Public Works (MassDPW, now MassDOT) planned an extension of Route 146 from Rhode Island north toward Worcester. MA 146 was built between 1949 and 1952 as a four-lane divided roadway from US 20 in Millbury to Boston Road in Sutton, and from Sutton south to the Massachusetts-Rhode Island border. Route 146 was built as a three-lane undivided roadway, providing one lane in each direction and a shared lane in the center.

In 1981, the MassDPW began work on rebuilding Route 146. During the next three years, the state rebuilt the 13.1-mile-long (21.1 km) section from just south of Boston Road in Sutton to the Massachusetts-Rhode Island border, replacing the three-lane undivided section with a four-lane freeway and eliminating all at-grade intersections and curb cuts.

The project upgrading the section linking Exit 94 on the Massachusetts Turnpike north into downtown Worcester at Brosnihan Square to Interstate Highway standards was completed in November 2007 according to MassHighway. The improvements to the road created an economic boon to the Blackstone Valley through which it passes. The improved transportation corridor has attracted several large employers since the road was upgraded. As of 2015, the road was widened and a major intersection was improved to fix traffic flow problems.

== Future ==
Exits traditionally were not numbered, but sequential numbers were assigned by MassHighway during the last sign replacement project. All interchanges were to be renumbered to milepost-based numbers under a project scheduled to start in 2016. However, this project was indefinitely postponed until November 18, 2019, the MassDOT confirmed that beginning in late summer 2020 the exit renumbering project will begin. On March 12, 2021, MassDOT announced that the highway's exits will be renumbered starting on March 17.

== Major intersections ==
The entire route is in Worcester County.

Location	mi	km	Old exit	New exit	Destinations	Notes
Millville	0.0	0.0	—	—	Route 146 south – Providence	Continuation into Rhode Island
Uxbridge	1.1	1.8		1	Route 146A – Uxbridge, North Smithfield, RI	
Uxbridge	2.6	4.2	2	3	Route 146A / Chocolog Road – Uxbridge	To Route 98
Uxbridge	5.3	8.5	3	6	Route 16 – Uxbridge, Douglas	To Route 122 via east
Douglas	7.6	12.2	4	8	Lackey Dam Road – Douglas, Northbridge	
Northbridge	8.5	13.7	5	9	Main Street – Northbridge, Sutton	
Sutton	10.3	16.6	6	11	Purgatory Road – Northbridge	
Sutton	12.3	19.8	7	13	Central Turnpike – Northbridge, Oxford	
Sutton	12.3	19.8	Northern end of freeway section			
Sutton	13.8	22.2			Boston Road – Wilkinsonville, Sutton Center	
Millbury	16.0	25.7	8	16	West Main Street – Millbury	Interchange
Millbury			Southern end of freeway section			
Millbury	16.9	27.2	9	17	Route 122A south – Millbury Center	Southern end of Route 122A concurrency
Millbury	17.9	28.8	10	18	I-90 / Mass Pike / US 20 – Springfield, Boston, Auburn, Northboro	Exit 94 on I-90 / Mass Pike
Worcester	18.8	30.3	11	19	Millbury Street – Quinsigamond Village	Northbound exit and southbound entrance
Worcester	19.5	31.4	12	20	Route 122A north (McKeon Road) to I-290 west / I-395 south – Vernon Hill, College of the Holy Cross, Auburn, Norwich, CT	Northern end of Route 122A concurrency; I-290 not signed southbound
Worcester	20.5	33.0	13	21	I-290 east to Route 9 / I-190 north – Shrewsbury, Marlboro, Fitchburg	Northbound exit and southbound entrance; exit 16 on I-290
Worcester	20.8	33.5	—	—	Cambridge Street / Quinsigamond Avenue – Downtown Worcester	Northern terminus; at-grade intersection
1.000 mi = 1.609 km; 1.000 km = 0.621 mi: Concurrency terminus; Incomplete access

== Suffixed routes ==
=== Route 146A ===
Route 146A
- Location: Uxbridge
- Length: 4.1 mi (6.6 km)
- Existed: 1984–present

Route 146A in Massachusetts, United States, is a 4.1-mile (6.6 km) north to south route which connects Route 122 in Uxbridge, and Rhode Island Route 146A in North Smithfield. There are two connector entrances to Route 146, along Route 146A. These are Exit 1, which connects Route 146 directly to Route 146A, and Exit 3, the Chockalog Road exit in Uxbridge. This highway was renamed by the Massachusetts General Court in 2004 as the Lydia Taft Highway, after America's first woman voter, Lydia Chapin Taft, a colonial woman from Uxbridge. Lydia Chapin Taft's historic vote and her role in the history of Women's suffrage is recognized by the Massachusetts legislature since 2004, which named Route 146A from Uxbridge to the Rhode Island border in her honor. Route 146A is completely within the town limits of Uxbridge.

In colonial times, this route had the name of "the Great Road", and later "the Quaker Highway", after Quakers from Smithfield, Rhode Island, settled here. There are a number of historic sites along this road including the Friends Meetinghouse, which is on the National Historic Register. The Moses Farnum House, and the Ironstone Mill Housing and Cellar Hole are two other sites along this road. Route 98 also connects with Route 146A, near its midpoint, and has significant historic sites of the original Quaker village known as Quaker City, and Aldrich Village, which are also on the National Historic Register. Just beyond the northern terminus of Route 146A and continuing north on Route 122 is a famous historical house known as Elmshade, a home and gathering place of the influential Taft family in America. Part of what is now Route 146A was the original Route 146 before a new limited access highway was constructed from the Rhode Island line to Worcester, between 1981 and 1984. This project involved moving a former almshouse cemetery and led to archeological findings on mortuary practices following that excavation. The Second Great Awakening changed local mortuary practices for the poor.

==== Major intersections ====
The entire route is in Uxbridge, Worcester County.

mi	km	Destinations	Notes
0.0	0.0	Route 146A south	Continuation into Rhode Island
0.9	1.4	Route 146 – Providence, RI, Worcester	Exit 1 on Route 146
2.3	3.7	Route 98 south – Harrisville, RI, Pascoag, RI	Northern terminus of Route 98
2.6	4.2	Route 146 – Providence, RI, Worcester	Exit 3 on Route 146
4.1	6.6	Route 122 – Uxbridge Ctr., Worcester, Millville, Blackstone	Northern terminus; To Route 16 via north
1.000 mi = 1.609 km; 1.000 km = 0.621 mi
