= Effingham Capron =

American Quaker, anti-slavery activist (1791–1859)

Effingham Lawrence Capron
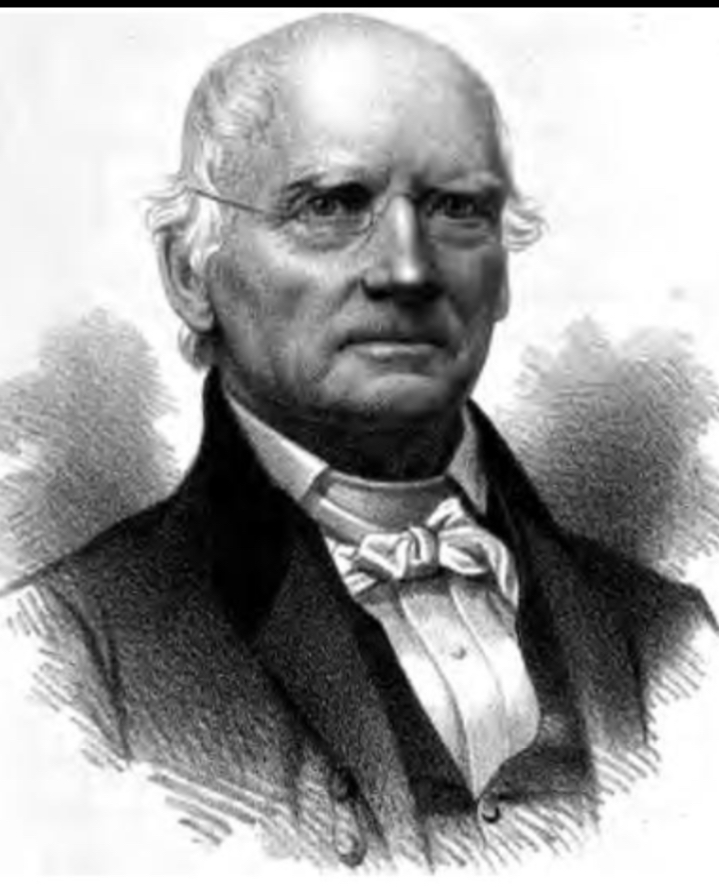
- Effingham Lawrence Capron
- Born: January 1, 1791; Pomfret, Connecticut, United States
- Died: January 1, 1859 (aged 68); Worcester, Massachusetts, United States
- Occupations: Industrial manufacturer, textiles; anti-slavery activist
- Known for: Textile pioneer, fiirst power looms for woolens in North America; Nationally known anti-slavery champion; assisted fugitives on the Underground Railroad
- Parent: John C. Capron Sr.

Effingham Lawrence Capron (1791 – 1859), a Quaker, was a mill owner, and nationally recognized leader of the anti-slavery movement prior to the Civil War. He was known especially in the Northeast United States for his anti-slavery work. He was born in Pomfret, Connecticut in March 1791, and died in Worcester, Massachusetts in 1859 at the age of 68. He was also a noted manufacturer of cotton and woolens in the early American Industrial period.

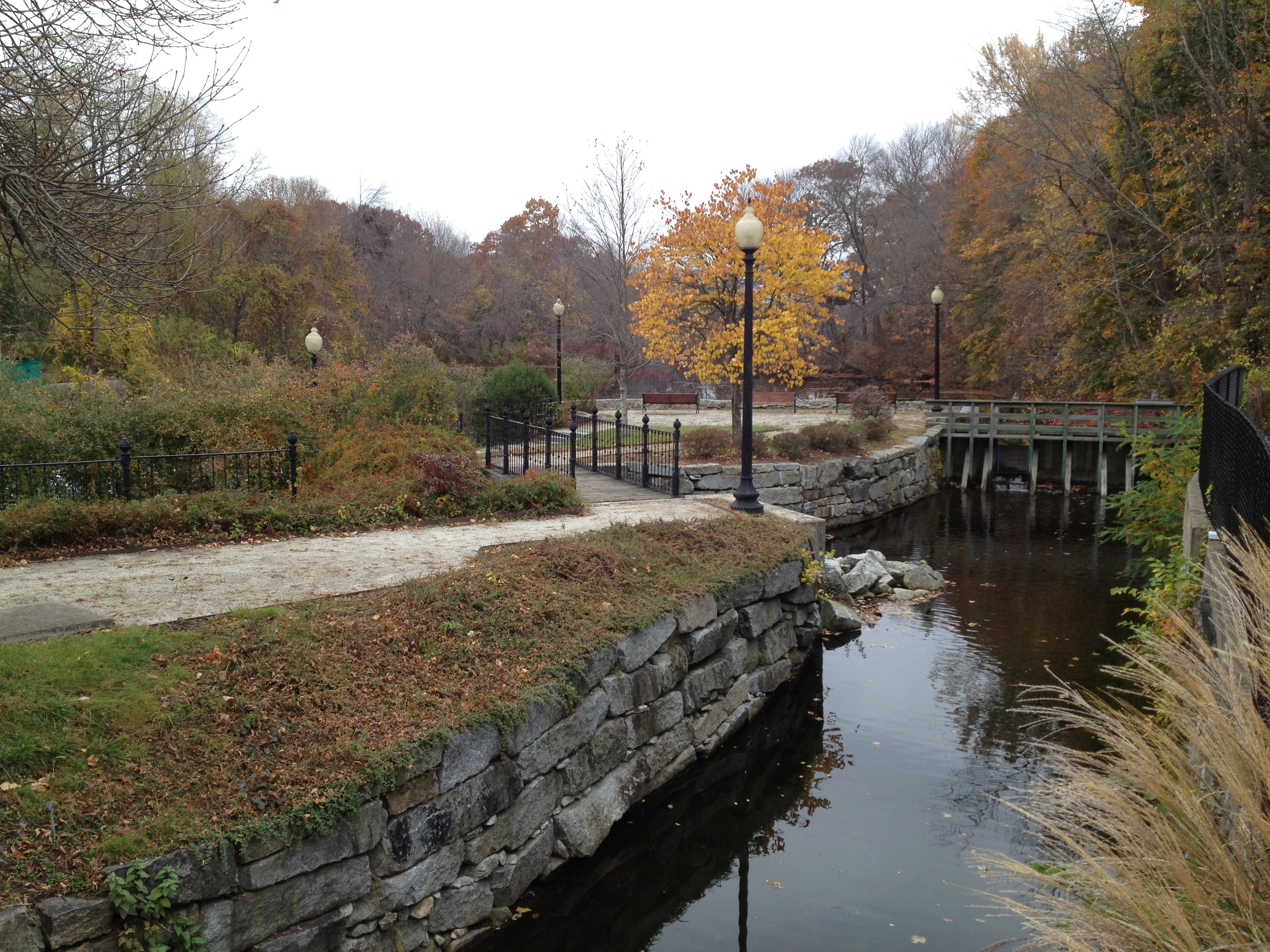
Effingham Capron was a national, state and local anti-slavery champion. He and his brother John Capron Jr and their father, ran the Capron Mill at Uxbridge. The historic park commemorates the contributions of Effingham Capron here and to the USA.

== Family and early life ==
Effingham Lawrence Capron, was born Mar. 29, 1791 at Pomfret, Windham County, Connecticut, USA, the son of the Capron mill's founder, John Capron Sr., who moved to Uxbridge, Massachusetts, from northeastern Connecticut, around the time of Effingham's birth. Effingham was educated in the Uxbridge schools and may have had some exposure to the great local educator Joshua Mason Macomber, who operated the Uxbridge Academy in this same community. Effingham, his brother John Willard Capron, and their father John Sr. operated the first woolen mill in America which used power looms, established at Uxbridge in 1820.

== Involvement with the anti-slavery cause ==
Capron became an ardent abolitionist in the anti-slavery movement of the pre-Civil War period, and was the head of the local branch of the Underground Railroad. The Quaker Meeting house at Uxbridge was also known for the ardent antislavery advocate Abby Kelley Foster, who also led Susan B. Anthony to the cause of abolitionism. Under the leadership of Effingham Capron, Abby Kelley Foster, and others, Uxbridge became a key junction in the Underground Railroad and the early efforts to free African Americans from slavery. In the words of local historian and a recent acting Uxbridge Police Chief, Peter Emrick, Capron was more than an abolitionist. He was a "liberator". Under Effingham's leadership, the Uxbridge Anti-slavery Society grew to over 450 members, as he rose to be the state and national Vice President of the anti-slavery societies. The Worcester area, including Uxbridge, became a hotbed of the abolition movement in America.

== Capron Park rededicated to Effingham Capron in 2012 ==
"During this 150th anniversary of the Civil War, it is fitting to honor a local resident who worked for one of the principal causes of that great conflict that split 'brother against brother,'" explained Senator Richard T. Moore of Uxbridge. Legislation, sponsored by Mr. Moore and state Rep. Kevin Kuros, R-Uxbridge, will officially name Capron Park at Capron pond and falls, as a state park honoring Effingham Capron. The park was to be re-dedicated as of September 29, 2012 in a ceremony dubbed "Fire on the falls", but was rescheduled at the last minute. Early water power from Uxbridge rivers and falls powered the beginnings of the American Industrial Revolution. The Capron Park is at the Center of the Blackstone Valley Heritage Park and Corridor, a National Historic Park of Massachusetts and Rhode Island.
