= Bezaleel Taft Jr. =

American politician

- Born: September 8, 1780
- Died: July 16, 1846 (aged 65)
- Occupation: Lawyer
- Parent(s): Bezaleel Taft Sr. Sarah Richardson
- Relatives: Taft family

Bezaleel Taft Jr. (September 8, 1780 – July 16, 1846) was an American lawyer and member of the Taft family who served in the Massachusetts General Court and the Massachusetts Governor's Council.

== Biography ==
Bezaleel Taft Jr. was the son of Bazaleel Taft Sr. and Sarah Richardson Taft. He was a descendant of Robert Taft Sr., the first American Taft. His grandmother, Lydia Chapin Taft, was America's First Woman Voter. His grandfather, Captain Josiah Taft, had fought in the French and Indian War. His father was a soldier and a Captain in the Worcester 9th Company, in the American Revolutionary War.

Taft graduated from Harvard College in 1804. He returned to Uxbridge to practice law and became a political leader in the town. In 1807, Bezaleel Taft Sr. built a large home in Uxbridge for his son. Taft married Margaret Spring, daughter of Rev. Samuel Spring of Newburyport, Massachusetts. They had three children. Margaret Spring Taft died on July 25, 1816. On November 30, 1817, he married her cousin, Hannah Spring. They had five children. One of his grandchildren, George S. Taft, was district attorney of Worcester County, Massachusetts.

Taft served several terms in the Massachusetts House of Representatives, was a member of the Massachusetts Senate from 1825 to 1827, and a member of the Massachusetts Governor's Council from 1828 to 1831.

Taft played an active role in the creation of the Worcester State Hospital and was the second president of the Blackstone Bank. He was elected a member of the American Antiquarian Society in 1820.

Taft died on July 16, 1846 at Uxbridge, at age 65. His cause of death is listed as "Consumption" in the Uxbridge vital records.
