= Israel Taft =

Colonial American farmer (1699–1753)

- Born: April 26, 1699; Mendon, Massachusetts, England
- Died: September 19, 1753 (aged 54); Mendon, Massachusetts, Great Britain
- Occupation: Farmer
- Spouse: Mercy Aldrich
- Children: Samuel, Hannah, and 17 others
- Father: Robert Taft

Israel Taft (April 26, 1699 – September 19, 1753) was the grandson of the U.S. Taft family founder Robert Taft and father of Revolutionary War soldier Samuel Taft. He was born in Mendon, Suffolk County, Massachusetts, and died at age 53.

== Early life and marriage ==
Israel Taft is an early American pioneer. He was the son of Robert Taft Jr., and grandson of Robert Taft Sr., the first American Taft, of the famous Taft family.

Israel lived his life in the western part of Mendon, Massachusetts, following the King Philip's War. This part of town later became the town of Uxbridge. Israel had nineteen children, two significant of whom were Hannah and Samuel Taft. In 1789, Samuel was the proprietor of a tavern in Uxbridge. This tavern is now known as Samuel Taft House. Newly elected President of the United States, George Washington, stayed one evening with Samuel Taft and his family.

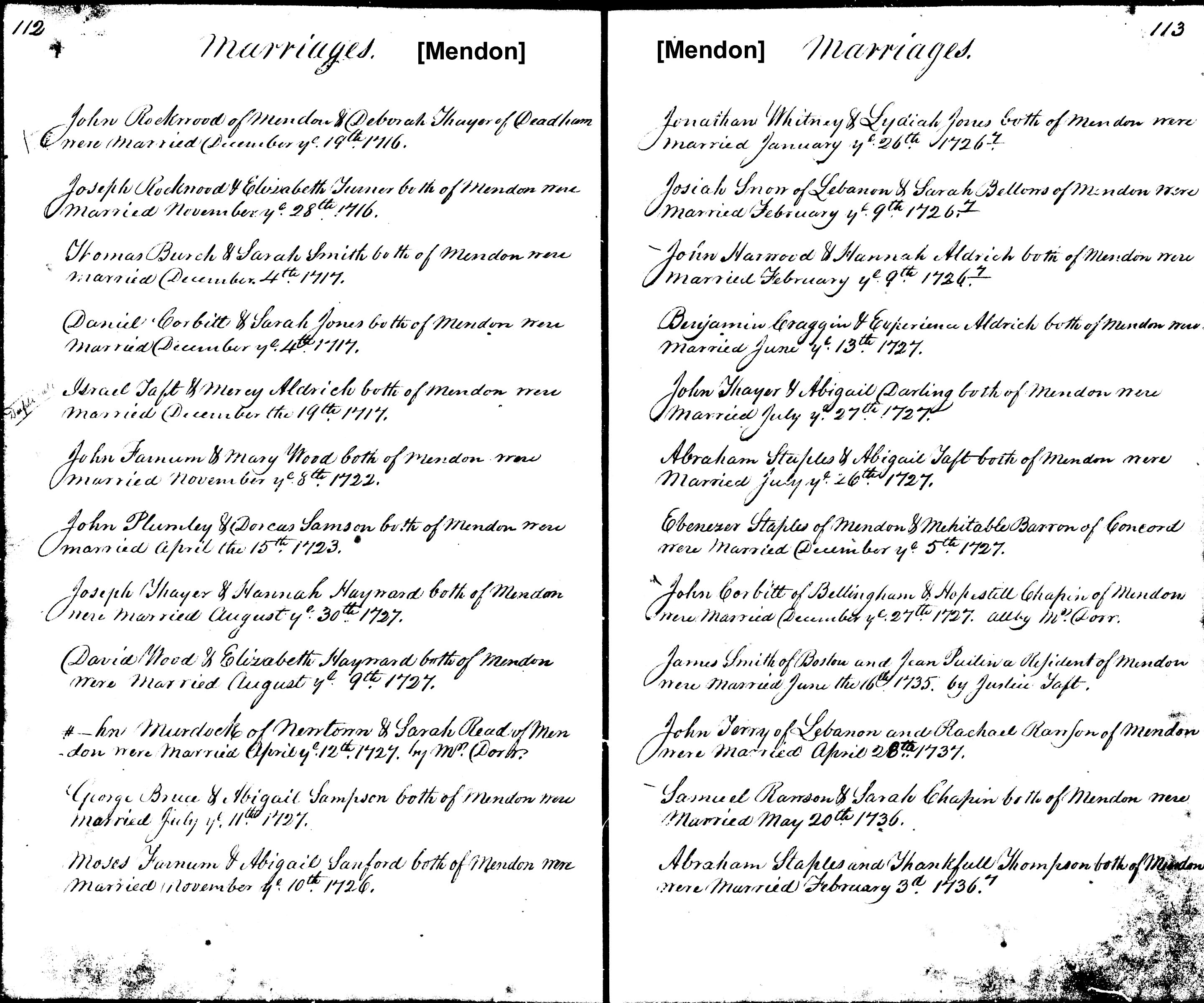
Marriage record of Israel Taft and Mercy Aldrich

== Significance ==
Israel's father, Robert Taft Jr. was a founder and founding Selectman on the first Board of Selectmen, of the colonial town of Uxbridge, in Worcester County, Massachusetts. The town of Uxbridge was incorporated as a separate town from Mendon in 1727. Robert Taft Jr., was the first known elected political figure in the famous Taft family, a dynasty in American politics. Robert Taft Jr., was a prominent citizen of Mendon and Uxbridge. He died in Uxbridge, Worcester County, in 1748. His descendants number among well-known Americans and political figures, especially among the Taft family in Ohio.
