= Robert Taft, 2nd =

Colonial Massachusetts politician

Robert Taft
- Born: Robert Taft Jr. c. 1674; Braintree, Massachusetts, England
- Died: April 29, 1748 (aged c. 74); Uxbridge, Massachusetts, Great Britain
- Spouse: Elizabeth Woodward
- Children: Israel, 9 daughters and 3 other sons
- Father: Robert Taft Sr
- Family: Taft family

Robert Taft Jr. (c. 1674 – April 29, 1748), also known as Robert Taft II, was a Massachusetts politician. He was born in Braintree, Massachusetts Bay Colony. He died at age 74 at Uxbridge, Worcester County, Massachusetts.

== Birth ==
Robert Taft Jr. is an early American pioneer. He was the son of Robert Taft Sr., the first American Taft, of the famous Taft family, and Sarah Simpson. Reports differ as to whether he was born in Ireland or Braintree.

== Early life and marriage ==
Robert lived the earliest part of his life at Braintree, until he was age 6, when his father moved back to the western part of Mendon, Massachusetts, following King Philip's War. This part of town separated as the town of Uxbridge in 1727. Robert Taft Jr. married Elizabeth Woodard of Braintree, Suffolk County. Braintree was part of Suffolk County until the formation of Norfolk County in 1793. Robert and Elizabeth had 13 children together: Elizabeth (b. 1695), Robert III (b. 1697), Israel (b. 1699), Mary (b. 1700), Jemimah (b. 1702), Elizabeth (b. 1704), Alice (b. 1707), Eunice (b. 1709), John (b. 1710), Jane (b. 1712), Jemima (b. 1713), Gideon (b. 1715), and Rebecca (b. 1717).

At the first March meeting of Uxbridge in 1727, Robert was chosen first selectman. He continued to figure in the town affairs, having undoubted weight and influence for a few years, when he gave up that kind of ambition to his son Captain John.

== Notable children ==
His oldest son, Robert III, had large transactions in real estate, and was popular, and held every office of trust and honor the town had to give, from fence viewer and tything-man, to selectman and representative in "the Great and General Court." He came upon the after his uncle Daniel Taft had become absorbed in the important duties which, at that time, weighed down a colonial justice of the peace.

Israel Taft, of Upton, Robert's second-born son, had nineteen children, one of whom was Samuel Taft. In 1789, Samuel was the proprietor of a tavern in Uxbridge. This tavern is now known as Samuel Taft House. The newly elected President of the United States, George Washington, stayed one evening with Samuel Taft and his family.

== Significance ==
Robert Taft Jr. was a founder and the founding Selectman on the first Board of Selectmen, of the colonial town of Uxbridge, in Worcester County, Massachusetts. The town of Uxbridge was incorporated as a separate town from Mendon in 1727. Robert Taft Jr. was the first known elected political figure in the famous Taft family, a dynasty in American politics. A prominent citizen of Mendon and Uxbridge, Robert Taft Jr. died in Uxbridge, Worcester County, in 1748. His descendants number among well-known Americans and political figures, especially among the Taft family in Ohio. Robert Taft Jr.'s descendants include Royal Chapin Taft, Governor of Rhode Island, Ezra T. Benson, Utah Territorial Legislator and LDS Church Apostle, his great-grandson Ezra Taft Benson, U.S. Secretary of Agriculture and thirteenth president of the Church of Jesus Christ of Latter-day Saints (LDS Church), and Kingsley Arter Taft, a U.S. Senator from Ohio and chief justice of the Ohio Supreme Court, among others.
