= Bazaleel Taft Jr. House and Law Office =

Historic house in Massachusetts, United States

Coordinates: 42.0670°N 71.6232°W

- U.S. National Register of Historic Places
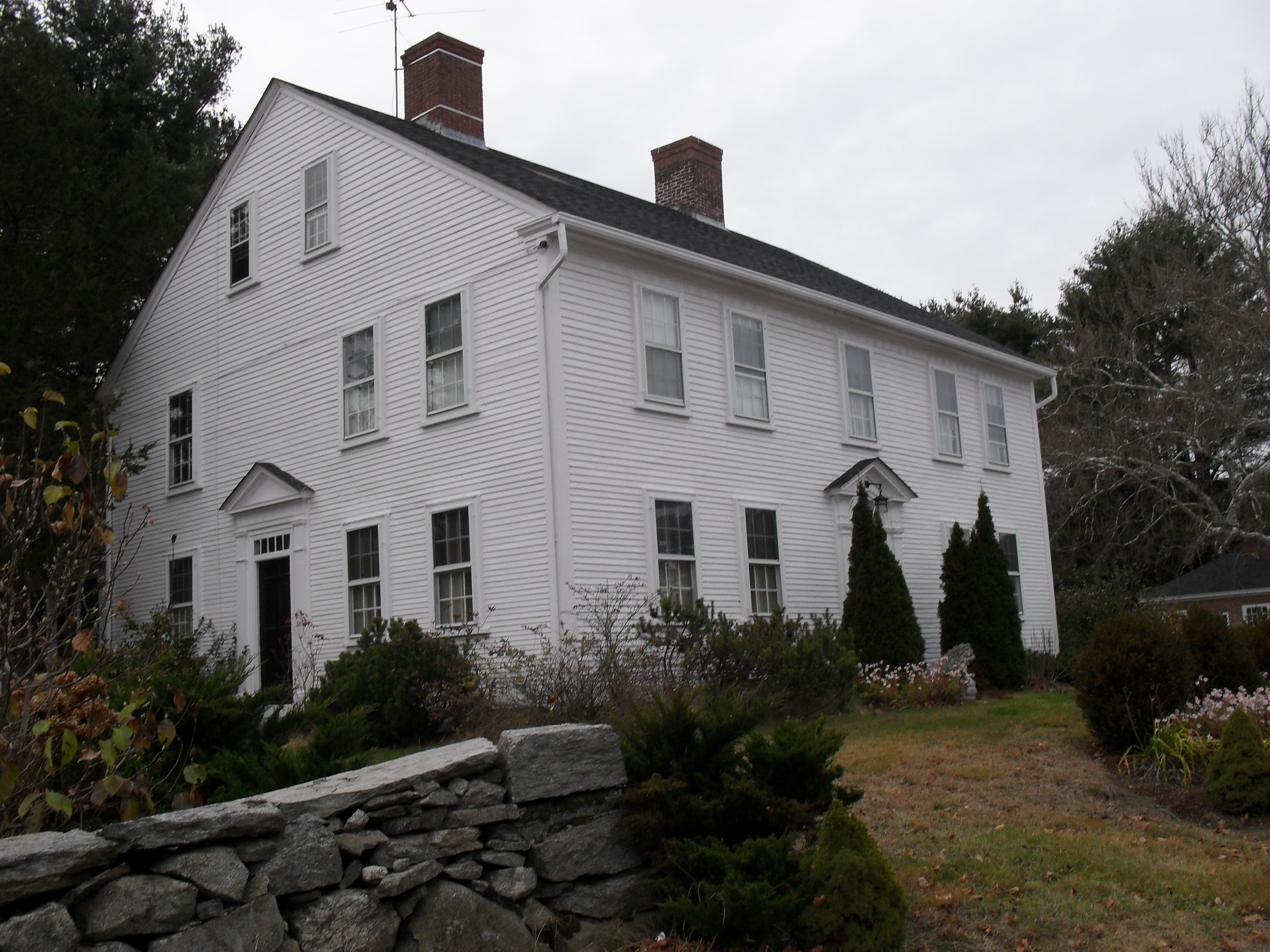
- The building in 2009
- Location: 195 South Main Street; Uxbridge, Massachusetts
- Built: 1807
- NRHP reference No.: 83004135
- Added to NRHP: November 7, 1983

The Bazaleel Taft Jr. House and Law Office are a historic house and law office building at 195 South Main Street in Uxbridge, Massachusetts. On November 7, 1983, they were listed on the National Register of Historic Places. The House and Law office reflect the Georgian Architecture Style.

== History ==
=== History and background ===
Elmshade, built in 1807 at 195 South Main Street, was built in the Georgian architecture style, and was a gift for Bezaleel Taft Jr. from Bezaleel Taft Sr., on his graduation from Harvard Law School. Bezaleel Jr. was the grandson of Lydia Taft, America's first woman voter. Bazaleel Jr. was practicing law next door in a brick building. Like his Father, Taft Jr. also became a State Senator and a representative to the General Court. He also served on the State Executive Council. He served as President of the Blackstone National Bank, of which he was a founder, for nearly 20 years.

=== Gathering place for the Taft family ===
Five generations of the Taft family descendants lived at Elmshade. A number of them had powerful political and legal careers, including George S. Taft, Bezaleel Jr's grandson. George was a lawyer, District Attorney and private secretary, chief of staff, to U.S. Senator George Hoar in the 1880s. His influence probably led to the Lincoln Square, Worcester Court House being erected., The "Life of Alphonso Taft by Lewis Alexander Leonard", on Google Books, is a particularly rich source of the history of the Taft family in Massachusetts. Elmshade was the site of Taft family reunions such as in 1874. Young William Howard Taft visited this home with his father Alphonso Taft, U.S. Secretary of War and founder of Skull and Bones at Yale. Alphonso Taft, who also served as United States Attorney General under President Ulysses S. Grant, delivered a powerful oratory on the Taft family and its roots in this area at this historic home during the reunion in 1874. Young William Howard Taft, and his brother Charles Phelps Taft, who founded the Chicago Cubs, both likely heard the speech. President William Howard Taft again visited this area, and this home, as a youth when he spent summers and even a term of school in Millbury. He would return here many years later as the American President to visit his kinfolk. The New York Times recorded President Taft's visits to his ancestral homes in Mendon and Uxbridge during his presidency.

=== Colonial style Georgian house and office ===
In the colonial period of America, the Georgian Architecture style was also built with wood and clapboard, though much of the construction was of brick. Wood clapboard is the style used for the Bezaleel Taft Jr house. The office was a brick style building. The link for Georgian architecture notes these distinctions.

== See also ==
- National Register of Historic Places listings in Uxbridge, Massachusetts
- Taft family, some of the family tree of the Taft family which originated here and includes Bezaleel Taft Jr.
- The Tafts of Mendon and Uxbridge
