= Taft family =

American political family

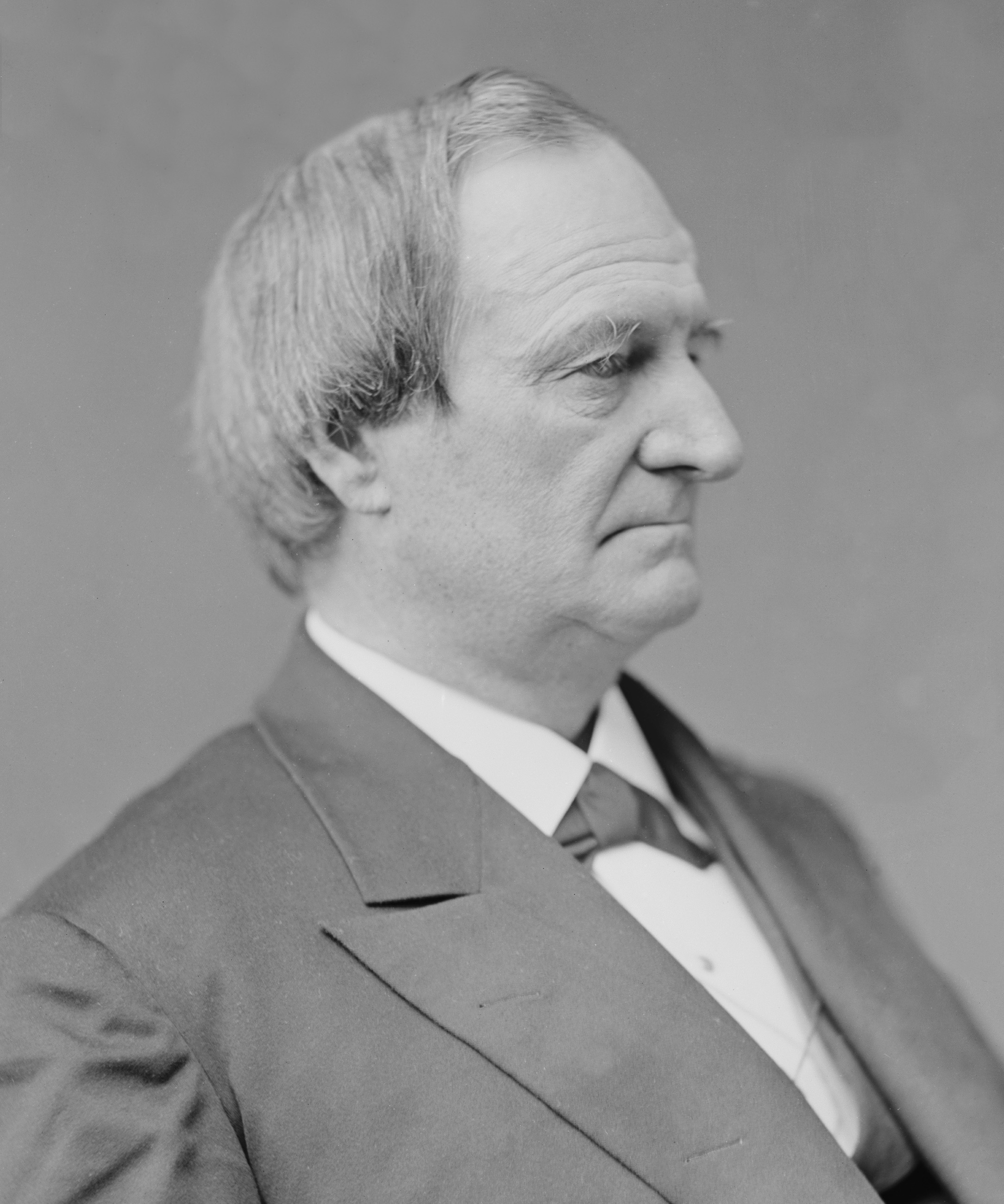
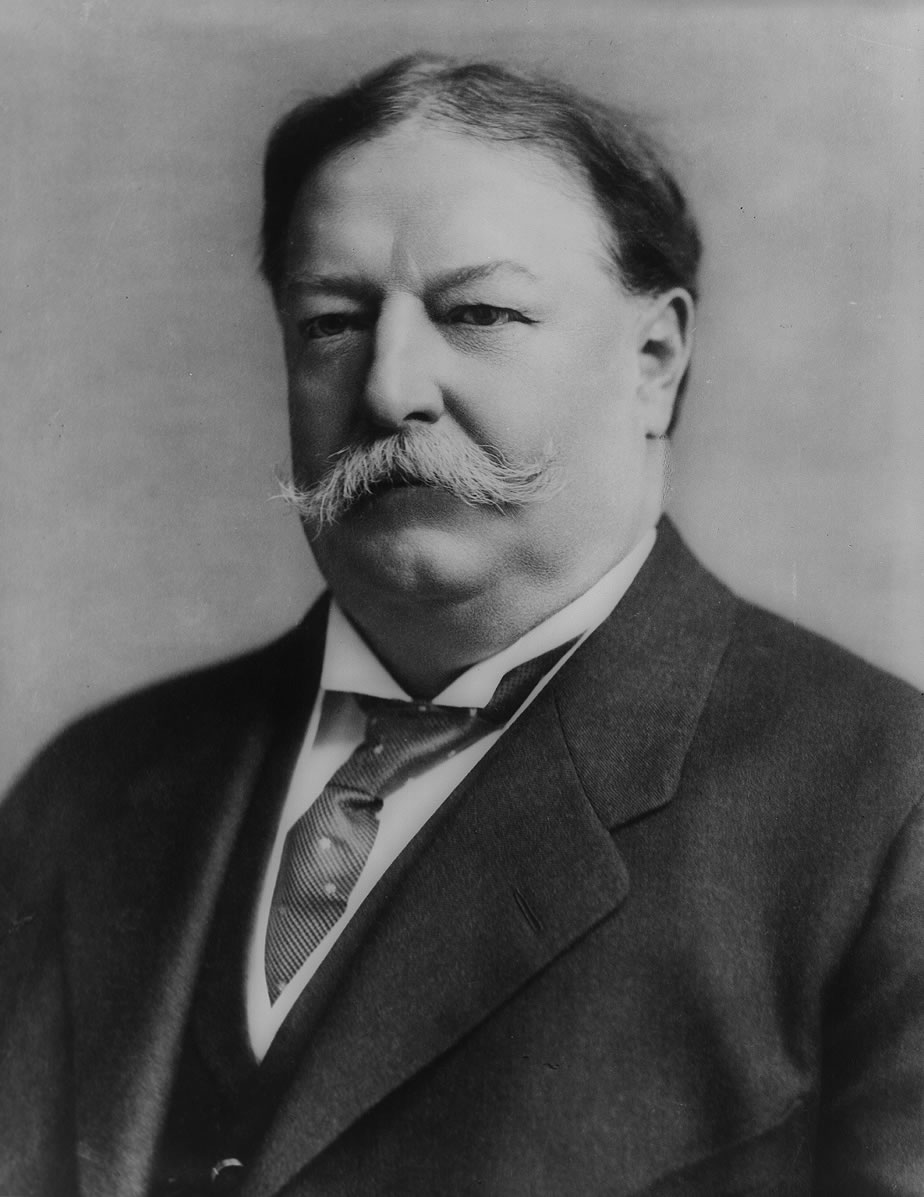
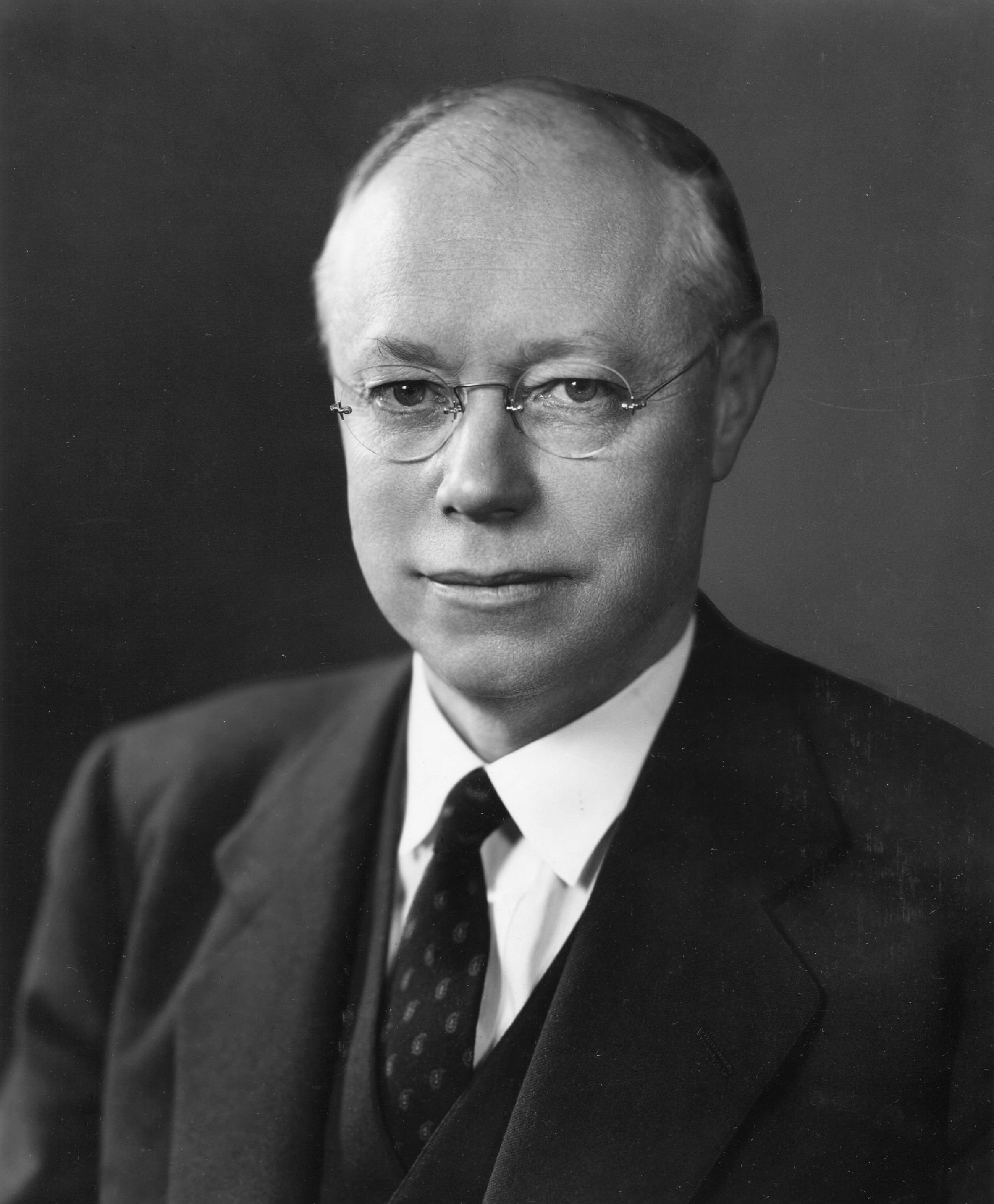
- Alphonso Taft William H. Taft Robert A. Taft
- Current region: New England, United States
- Origin: Norwich, Norfolk, England; County Louth, Ireland
- Titles: List: President of the United States; First Lady of the United States; Chief Justice of the United States; United States Secretary of War; Acting United States Secretary of Defense; United States Attorney General; United States Secretary of Agriculture; Senate Majority Leader; United States Senator (Ohio); U.S. Representative (Ohio); United States federal judge (Sixth Circuit Court of Appeals); United States Deputy Secretary of Defense; Solicitor General of the United States; General Counsel of the Department of Defense; Legal Adviser of the Department of State; Assistant Secretary of State for Population, Refugees, and Migration; United States Ambassador (to Ireland, NATO, Russia, Austria-Hungary); Governor-General of the Philippines; Provisional Governor of Cuba; Governor (Ohio, Rhode Island); Secretary of State of Ohio; First lady (Ohio, Cincinnati); State senator (Ohio); Speaker of the House (Ohio); State representative (Ohio); Prosecuting attorney (Hamilton County); County commissioner (Cuyahoga County); Mayor (Cincinnati)
- Connected families: Lippitt family
- Estate: William Howard Taft National Historic Site

The Taft family is an American political family of English descent, with origins in Massachusetts. Its members have served in the states of Massachusetts, Ohio, Rhode Island, Utah, and Vermont, and the United States federal government, in various positions such as representative (two), governor of Ohio, governor of Rhode Island, senator (three), secretary of agriculture, attorney general, secretary of war (two), acting secretary of defense, president, and chief justice.

== Overview ==
The first known ancestor of the Taft family is Richard Robert Taft, who was born in England in 1614 and died in County Louth, Kingdom of Ireland in 1700, which is also where his son, Robert Taft Sr., was born circa 1640. Robert Taft Sr. would be the first Taft to migrate to what is now the United States. He married his wife Sarah Simpson, who was born in January 1640 in England, in 1668 in Braintree, Massachusetts. Robert Taft Sr. began a homestead in what is today Uxbridge and then Mendon, circa 1680, and which was where he and his wife died in 1725 and 1726 respectively. His son, Robert Taft Jr., was a member of the founding Board of Selectmen for the new town of Uxbridge in 1727.

A branch of the Massachusetts Taft family descended from Daniel Taft Sr., son of Robert Taft Sr., born at Braintree, 1677–1761, died at Mendon. Daniel, a justice of the peace in Mendon, had a son Josiah Taft, later of Uxbridge, who died in 1756. This branch of the Taft family claims America's first woman voter, Lydia Taft, and five generations of Massachusetts legislators and public servants beginning with Lydia's husband, Josiah Taft.

The Tafts were very prominently represented as soldiers in the Revolutionary War, mostly in the New England states. Peter Rawson Taft I was born in Uxbridge in 1785 and moved to Townshend, Vermont circa 1800. He became a Vermont state legislator. He died in Cincinnati, Hamilton County, Ohio. His son, Alphonso Taft, was born in Townshend, Vermont, and attended Yale University, where he founded the Skull and Bones society. He later was Secretary of War and Attorney General of the United States and the father of President William Howard Taft. Elmshade in Massachusetts was the site of Taft family reunions such as in 1874.

== Notable members ==
Robert Taft, Sr.: First Taft to settle in America

Alphonso Taft: Great great great grandson of Robert Taft Sr. United States attorney general and United States secretary of war under President Ulysses S. Grant.

Charles Phelps Taft: Eldest son of Alphonso Taft. Baseball team owner, single-term member of the United States House of Representatives.

William Howard Taft: Son of Alphonso Taft. United States president from 1909 to 1913 and chief justice of the United States Supreme Court from 1921 to 1930.

Robert Alphonso Taft, Sr: Son of William Howard Taft. Majority Leader of the United States Senate in 1953, prominent United States senator from Ohio from 1939 until his death in 1953.

Robert Alphonso Taft, Jr: Son of Robert Alphonso Taft, Sr. Representative and senator from Ohio.

Robert Alphonso Taft III. Son of Robert Alphonso Taft, Jr. Governor of Ohio from 1999 to 2007.

== History ==
The American Taft family began with Robert Taft Sr., who immigrated to Braintree, Massachusetts circa, 1675. There was early settlement at Mendon, Massachusetts circa 1669 and again in 1680 at what was later Uxbridge, after the King Philip's War ended. Robert's homestead was in western Mendon, in what later became Uxbridge, and his son was on the founding board of selectmen. In 1734, Benjamin Taft started an iron forge, in Uxbridge, where some of the earliest beginnings of America's industrial revolution began. Robert Sr.'s son, Daniel, a justice of the peace in Mendon had a son Josiah Taft, later of Uxbridge, who died in 1756. Josiah's widow became "America's first woman voter", Lydia Chapin Taft, when she voted in three Uxbridge town meetings.

President George Washington visited Samuel Taft's Tavern in Uxbridge in 1789 on his "inaugural tour" of New England. President William Howard Taft's grandfather, Peter Rawson Taft I, was born in Uxbridge in 1785. The Hon. Bezaleel Taft Sr., Lydia's son, left a legacy of five generations or more of public service, including at least three generations in the state legislature of Tafts in Massachusetts. Ezra Taft Benson, Sr, a famous Mormon pioneer, lived here between 1817 and 1835, and married his first wife Pamela, of Northbridge, in 1832. This family eventually became an American political dynasty.

== The first settler: Robert Taft Sr. ==
- Robert Taft Sr. (c. 1640–1725); The famous Taft family in America developed its roots in Mendon and Uxbridge. Robert Taft, Sr, whose name in Ireland was Robert Taaffe, came to America from County Louth, Ireland. The original American Taft homestead was in western Mendon, which later became Uxbridge, and was built by Robert Taft Sr., the first immigrant, in 1681. Robert Taft Sr. had built an earlier home in 1669, but it was abandoned due to King Philip's War. Robert Taft Sr.'s descendants are a large politically active family with descendants who are prominent in Ohio, but live throughout the U.S.
- Robert Taft Jr.; was born in 1674 to Robert Sr., and Sarah Taft at Braintree. He grew up in the western part of Mendon in what later became Uxbridge. He became a founding member of the Uxbridge Board of Selectmen in 1727. Robert Taft Jr. may have been the first American Taft to hold political office. His descendants included a governor of Rhode Island, Royal Chapin Taft; a United States senator from Ohio, Kingsley Arter Taft; and a U.S. secretary of agriculture, Ezra Taft Benson II, among others.

== America's first woman voter and her descendants ==
- Lydia Chapin Taft; Noteworthy among early Uxbridge residents was Lydia Chapin Taft, a Mendon native by birth, who voted in three official Uxbridge town meetings, beginning in 1756. She was the widow of Robert Taft Sr.'s grandson, Josiah Taft, who had served in the Colonial Legislature. Josiah was the son of Daniel Taft of Mendon. Taft was America's First Woman Voter. This is recognized by the Massachusetts legislature. Her first historic vote, a first in Women's suffrage, was in favor of appropriating funds for the regiments engaged in the French and Indian War.
- Hon. Bezaleel Taft Sr., Lydia's son, held the rank of captain in the American Revolution, and answered the Battle of Lexington and Concord Alarm on April 18, 1775, while Lydia looked on. Hebecame a prominent Massachusetts legislator and state senator. At least 12 soldiers with the surname of Taft served in the Revolutionary War from the town of Uxbridge. Many more Tafts from throughout the former colonies also served in the War of Independence.
- Hon. Bezaleel Taft Jr., the son, followed a legislative career in the Massachusetts General Court, the state Senate, and the State Executive Council.
- George S. Taft, Bezaleel Jr.'s grandson, was district attorney of Worcester County, Massachusetts
- The tradition of public service continued for at least five generations in this Massachusetts branch of the Taft family. Life of Alphonso Taft by Lewis Alexander Leonard is a particularly rich source of the history of the Taft family origins in Massachusetts.
- Other local Tafts in political service in the Massachusetts legislature included Arthur M. Taft, Arthur Robert Taft, and Zadok Arnold Taft. Royal Chapin Taft, originally from Northbridge, became the Governor of Rhode Island. The number of Tafts in public service across America was extraordinary including New Hampshire, Rhode Island, Vermont, Ohio, Michigan, Utah, and other states.

== A presidential visit ==
- First president's visit: Samuel Taft was an American Revolutionary War soldier, father of 22, an Uxbridge farmer and tavern keeper. President George Washington stayed at the Samuel Taft Tavern in November 1789, during the founding father's inaugural trip through New England.
November 8, 1789.

Sir:

Being informed that you have given my name to one of your sons, and called another after Mrs. Washington's family, and being moreover very much pleased with the modest and innocent looks of your two daughters, Patty and Polly, I do for these reasons send each of these girls a piece of chintz; and to Patty, who bears the name of Mrs. Washington, and who waited more upon us than Polly did, I send five guineas, with which she may buy herself any little ornament she may want, or she may dispose of them in any other manner more agreeable to herself. As I do not give these things with a view to having it talked of, or even to its being known, the less there is said about the matter the better you will please me; but, that I may be sure the chintz and money have got safe to hand, let Patty, who I dare say is equal to it, write me a line informing me thereof, directed to 'The President of the United States at New York.' I wish you and your family well, and am,

etc. Yours,
George Washington

– Letter to Mr. Samuel Taft, written from Hartford, Connecticut on November 8, 1789

== Mendon-Uxbridge connections to the Ohio Tafts, presidential ancestors ==
President William Howard Taft's grandfather, Peter Rawson Taft I, was born in Uxbridge in 1785 and grew up there. His father Aaron moved to Townshend, Vermont, because of the difficult economy, when he was fifteen. The story is told that Peter Rawson walked a cow all the way from Uxbridge to Townshend, a distance of well over 100 miles. The "Aaron Taft house" is now on the National Register of Historic Places. Peter Rawson Taft I became a Vermont legislator and eventually died in Hamilton County, Cincinnati, Ohio. Peter Rawson Taft's son, Alphonso Taft, founded Skull and Bones at Yale, served as U.S. Secretary of War, and his son William Howard Taft became the U.S. President. The ancestry of U.S. presidents traces to Uxbridge and Mendon more than once, including both presidents bearing the last name Bush.

President Taft, a champion for world peace and the only president to also serve as chief justice of the United States, returned to Uxbridge for family reunions. He remarked as he stepped off the train there on April 3, 1905, "Uxbridge,... I think I have more relatives here than in any town in America." Young William Howard Taft had made other trips to Uxbridge, and Bezaleel Taft, Jr.'s home, "Elmshade", in his earlier years. It was at "Elmshade" that young William Howard Taft likely heard his father, Alphonso Taft, proudly deliver an oratory on the Taft family history and the family's roots in Uxbridge, and Mendon, circa 1874. President Taft stayed at the Samuel Taft tavern when he visited Uxbridge, as did George Washington 120 years earlier. The New York Times recorded President Taft's visits to his ancestral homes in Mendon and Uxbridge during his presidency. William Howard Taft, as a young boy, spent a number of summers in the Blackstone Valley in Millbury, Massachusetts, and even attended schools for at least a term in that nearby town.

== A Mormon apostle ==
Ezra T. Benson (to distinguish him from his famous great-grandson, Ezra Taft Benson), a Mendon and Uxbridge native, is famous as a key early apostle of the Mormon religion. His own autobiography states that he lived in Uxbridge between 1817 and 1835, or about 17 years, after his mother, Chloe Taft and father, John Benson, moved to a farm there.

Young Ezra married Pamela Andrus, of Northbridge, on January 1, 1832, at Uxbridge. He had moved in with his family in an Uxbridge center Hotel in 1827. He and Pamela lived here in the 1830s, had children, and had a child who died, which is recorded in the Uxbridge Vital Records. He later managed and owned the hotel in Uxbridge Center before investing in a cotton mill at Holland, Massachusetts. He moved to Holland Mass in 1835. He later moved to Illinois, and became a Mormon apostle. Ezra joined the LDS Church at Quincy, Illinois in 1840, entered plural marriages, marrying seven more wives after Pamela. He was called to the Quorum of the Twelve Apostles by Brigham Young in 1846, a high post within the LDS Church. He had eight wives and 32 children. He was a Missionary to the Sandwich Islands, also known as Hawaii. He served as a Representative to the Utah Territorial Assembly. He died in Ogden, Utah, in 1869.

== Tafts in the Blackstone Valley's industrialization ==
Benjamin Taft started the first iron forge in the Ironstone section of Uxbridge in 1734 There was good quality "bog iron ore" here. Caleb Handy added a triphammer, and scythes and guns were manufactured here before 1800. The Taft family continued to be instrumental in the early industrialization of the Blackstone Valley including mills built by a 4th generation descendant of Robert Taft I, the son of Deborah Taft, Daniel Day in 1810, and his son in law, Luke Taft (1825) and Luke's son, Moses Taft in (1852).

These woolen mills, some of the first to use power looms, and satinets, ran 24/7 during the Civil War producing cloth for U.S. military uniforms. The 1814 Rivulet Mill Complex was established at North Uxbridge by Chandler Taft. In 1855, 2.5 million yards of cloth was produced in the mills of Uxbridge. Uxbridge is the center of the Blackstone Valley, the earliest industrialized region in the United States. It is part of the John H. Chafee Blackstone River Valley National Heritage Corridor. Samuel Slater, who built his mill in (1790), at Pawtucket, Rhode Island, on the Blackstone River, was credited by President Andrew Jackson as the father of America's Industrial Revolution.

== Mayor Henry Chapin: an Uxbridge "Taft" story ==
In 1864, Judge Henry Chapin, a three-term Worcester Mayor and Chief Judge, quoted a well known Uxbridge story as follows: A stranger came to town, met a new person and said, "Hello Mr. Taft". Mr. Taft said, "How did you know my name?" The stranger replied, "I presumed that you were a Taft, just like the other 12 Tafts I have just met!". This story was repeated in a poem form by Mayor Chapin, at a famous Taft family reunion here, recorded in the Life of Alphonso Taft.
