= George R. Stobbs =

American politician

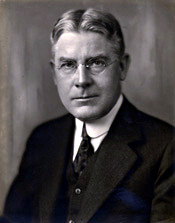

Member of the U.S. House of Representatives from Massachusetts's 4th district
- In office March 4, 1925 – March 3, 1931
- Preceded by: Samuel Winslow
- Succeeded by: Pehr G. Holmes

Personal details
- Born: February 7, 1877 Webster, Massachusetts
- Died: December 23, 1966 (aged 89) Worcester, Massachusetts
- Party: Republican
- Spouse: Mabel Florence Murdock (1875-1944) (m. 1905)
- Education: Harvard University; Harvard Law School
- Profession: Attorney

Military service
- Allegiance: United States of America
- Branch/service: Massachusetts State Guard; Officers Reserve Corps
- Years of service: 1917-1920 (State Guard); 1927-1942 (Reserve)
- Rank: Captain (State Guard); Lieutenant Colonel (Reserve Corps)

George Russell Stobbs (February 7, 1877 – December 23, 1966) was an attorney and politician. A Republican. He served as a member of the United States House of Representatives from Massachusetts for three terms.

== Early life ==
Stobbs was born in Webster, Massachusetts on February 7, 1877, the son of Charles Richard Stobbs and Anna Lincoln. He attended the local schools of Webster, and graduated from Phillips Exeter Academy in 1895. He received his bachelor's degree from Harvard University in 1899, and a master's degree from Harvard in 1900. He received his law degree from Harvard Law School in 1902, was admitted to the bar, and commenced practice in Worcester, Massachusetts.

== Military service ==
Stobbs commanded Company H, 20th Infantry Regiment of the Massachusetts State Guard from 1917 to 1920, and attained the rank of captain. The State Guard was a volunteer organization which handled many of the in state responsibilities of the Massachusetts National Guard during the National Guard's overseas deployment for World War I. From 1927 to 1942, Stobbs was a major and subsequently lieutenant colonel in the Judge Advocate General’s Department of the Officers Reserve Corps.

== Political career ==
Stobbs served on Webster's school board from 1903 to 1906, and was active in Webster's Young Men's Republican Club, of which he served as president in 1904. In 1908 he relocated to Worcester, where he practiced law in partnership with George S. Taft. Stobbs was a special justice for the central district court of Worcester from 1909 to 1916, and assistant district attorney for the middle district of Massachusetts from 1917 to 1921.

In 1924, Stobbs was the successful Republican nominee for a seat in the United States House of Representatives; he was reelected twice, and served in the 69th, 70th, and 71st Congresses (March 4, 1925 - March 3, 1931). He did not run for reelection in 1930. During his House career, Stobbs was one of the managers appointed in 1926 to conduct impeachment proceedings against George W. English, the judge of the United States District Court for the Eastern District of Illinois.

In 1930, Stobbs was a U.S. delegate to the Inter-Parliamentary Union Congress in London. He was a delegate to the 1932 Republican National Convention, and to the Republican state conventions in 1940 and 1942.

== Later career ==
After leaving Congress, Stobbs resumed practicing law in Worcester, Massachusetts and became the senior partner in the firm of Stobbs, Stockwell & Tilton. He died in on December 23, 1966, and was buried at Worcester Rural Cemetery.

== Family ==
In 1905, Stobbs was married to Mabel Florence Murdock (1875-1944). Their children included sons Russell (1907-1975) and Hamilton (1910-1938).

== Sources ==
=== Books ===
- Massachusetts Adjutant General (1920). Annual Report of the Adjutant General of Massachusetts. Boston, MA: Wright & Potter.
- Phillips Exeter Academy (1903). General Catalogue of Officers and Students, 1783-1903. Exeter, NH: News-Letter Press. p. 162.
- President and Fellows of Harvard University (1901). The Harvard University Catalogue. Cambridge, MA: Harvard University.
- Taylor, Charles William (1949). Eminent Judges and Lawyers of the American Bar. San Francisco, CA: W. W. Taylor.
- Warren, Charles (1908). History of the Harvard Law School. Vol. 1. New York, NY: Lane Publishing Company. ISBN 9781584770060.

=== Newspapers ===
- "George Stobbs, 90, Was Congressman". Poughkeepsie Journal. Poughkeepsie, NY. Associated Press. December 25, 1966.

U.S. House of Representatives
Preceded by Samuel E. Winslow	Member of the U.S. House of Representatives from Massachusetts's 4th congressional district March 4, 1925 – March 3, 1931	Succeeded by Pehr G. Holmes
