= Hon. Bazaleel Taft House =

United States historic place

- U.S. National Register of Historic Places
- U.S. Historic district – Contributing property
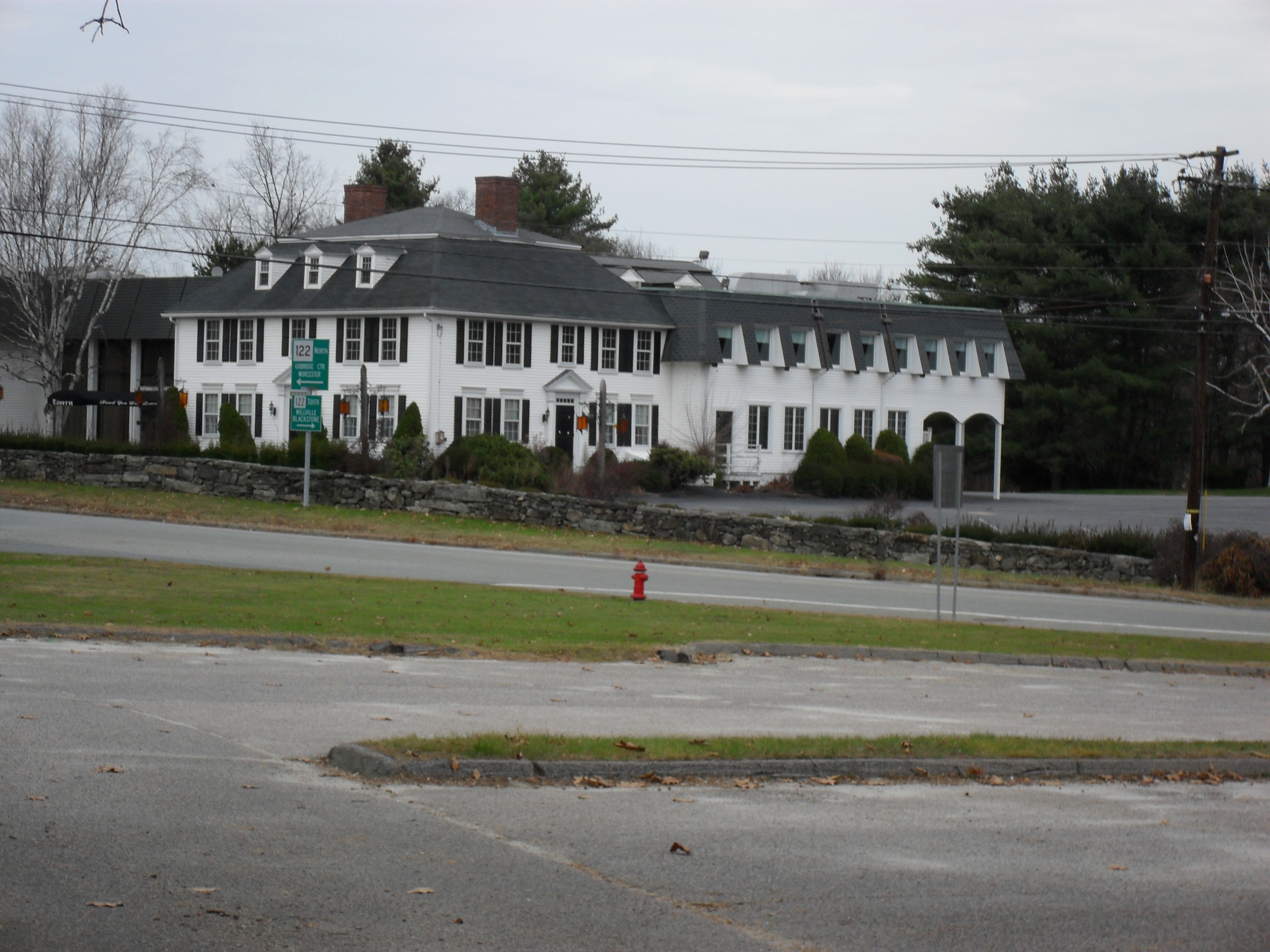

- Location within Massachusetts Location within the United States
- Location: 240 South Main Street, Uxbridge, Massachusetts
- Coordinates: 42°3′52″N 71°37′20″W
- Area: less than one acre
- Built: 1790
- Part of: Blackstone Canal Historic District (ID95001004)
- NRHP reference No.: 83004136

Significant dates
- Added to NRHP: November 7, 1983
- Designated CP: August 15, 1995

The Hon. Bazaleel Taft House was a historic house at 240 South Main Street in Uxbridge, Massachusetts. The oldest portion of this now-large house was built c. 1780-90 by Bazaleel Taft, and is a fine regional example of late Georgian architecture. The house was adapted for use as a restaurant in the 1960s, which has since closed. The house was listed on the National Register of Historic Places in 1983. It was razed in 2026 after years of neglect.

== Description and history ==
The Bazaleel Taft House is located south of Uxbridge center on Massachusetts Route 122 at the intersection with the northern terminus of Massachusetts Route 146A. It is a 2 1/2-story wood-frame structure, with a two-level hip roof and clapboarded exterior. Attached to its east and north are a modern addition made as part of the building's restaurant conversion. The house as two primary facades, one facing west and the other south. Each is five bays wide, with a center entrance flanked by pilasters and topped by a transom window, entablature, and gabled pediment. The lower level of the roof on the west side has three gabled dormers.

The exact construction date of the house is not known. The property on which it stands had a long association with the locally prominent Taft family, beginning with Daniel Taft in the early 18th century. The house is considered locally to have been built around 1790, by Bazaleel Taft, Daniel's grandson. Taft was like his father the town's largest landowner of the period, and was active in local and state politics, serving as a state representative and senator, and on the Massachusetts Governor's Council. Taft's son-in-law, Joseph Thayer, and his daughter Chloe next occupied the house; Thayer was instrumental in furthering construction of the Blackstone Canal, which passed through Taft family land east of the house.

The house was converted into a restaurant in the late 1960s, serving in that role until 2008. The property has since stood vacant. The building was demolished on June 22, 2026.

== Local legends ==
During the restaurant conversion, a Hessian sword was found in one of the walls, supporting a local legend that German mercenaries had visited the property as they marched through the Blackstone Valley during the Revolutionary War. The renovations uncovered a number of 'cubby holes' throughout the mansion, constructed for no apparent reason, which supported another local legend that hiding spots were designed to conceal escaped slaves on the Underground Railroad to Canada.

== See also ==
- National Register of Historic Places listings in Uxbridge, Massachusetts
