= Bazaleel Taft Sr. =

American politician

- Born: November 3, 1750; Uxbridge, Massachusetts
- Died: June 21, 1839 (aged 88); Uxbridge, Massachusetts
- Other name: Bezaleel Taft
- Relatives: Josiah Taft (father); Lydia Chapin Taft (mother)
- Military career
- Allegiance: United States of America
- Branch: Continental Army Massachusetts Militia
- Service years: 1775-1780
- Rank: Captain
- Unit: Worcester 9th Company
- Commands: Worcester 9th Company
- Conflicts: Battles of Lexington and Concord, American Revolution
- Other work: Massachusetts state legislator Massachusetts state senate

Bazaleel Taft Sr., his first name is also spelled Bezaleel (November 3, 1750 – June 21, 1839), was an American Revolutionary War soldier, captain, and state legislator from Uxbridge, Massachusetts. He built the Hon. Bazaleel Taft House, which is on the National Register of Historic Places.

== Early life ==
Bazaleel Taft Sr. was born to Josiah Taft and Lydia Chapin Taft at Uxbridge on November 3, 1750. He was one of eight children. Taft grew up in the pre-Revolutionary War period in the Massachusetts colony.

Josiah was a farmer and town clerk. He had been a member of the Massachusetts General Court, or legislature of the colony in 1753. A captain, Josiah fought in the French and Indian Wars, and died on September 30, 1756, two weeks after burying his son Caleb. Caleb was away at college when he died. Taft became Josiah and Lydia's eldest surviving son.

Taft descended from Robert Taft Sr. (1640 or before – February 8, 1725) of Braintree, Massachusetts, his great grandfather of the Taft family. Robert Taft Sr. established his family in Mendon, in what later became the town of Uxbridge, where he built a fort. Robert was a carpenter and a farmer. William Howard Taft, President of the United States, was from this same family.

== Military service and legislative career ==
Taft fought in the American Revolutionary War. He mustered in to Captain Samuel Read's Company in Uxbridge on April 19, 1775 as a sergeant. That day, he marched in the Lexington Alarm. Adjunct 3rd Worcester Company regiment, commanded by Lieutenant Colonel Nathan Tyler. He was engaged December 8, 1776, and the regiment marched to Providence, Rhode Island. He was discharged January 29, 1777. He served as 2nd lieutenant under Captain Edward Segrave's 9th Company, 3rd Worcester Company, regiment of the Massachusetts militia. He was commissioned January 30, 1778. He was then adjunct to Colonel Benjamin Hawes's regiment. He entered service July 31, 1778, the regiment marched to Rhode Island, and he was discharged September 12, 1778. Taft and Abner Taft asked to resign from their commissions to return to Uxbridge due to redistricting, which was approved by Colonel Nathan Tyler. He was also Captain of the 9th company of Tyler's 3rd Worcester Company, commissioned April 14, 1780. Based on an alarm, Taft marched to Tiverton, Rhode Island, on July 27, 1780.

Taft was a loyal federalist. Taft served in the state legislature as a representative and in the senate for over 30 years. His son, Bezaleel Taft Jr, would also serve in the Massachusetts General Court, and in the state Senate.

In 1817, Taft was a presidential elector for the Worcester district.

== Personal life ==
Taft was first married to Abigail Taft, and they had a daughter Eunice, born January 28, 1775, who married Deacon Phinehas Chapin. Abigail died on August 12, 1775.

Taft next married Sarah Richardson on January 2, 1777. They had a son, Bezaleel Taft, Jr (1780-1846), who was a lawyer and legislator and a daughter Chloe, born March 10, 1793, who married Joseph Thayer, Esq. The Thayers later lived in the Hon. Bazaleel Taft House that her father built. Chloe was the mother of Henry Chapin's two wives. Taft and Sarah had children who died young, at least one other son and one daughter. Sarah died on April 27, 1809.

Taft became the first church moderator of the First Congregational Society when it was established in 1797. Hon. Bazaleel Taft Sr. died at the age of 89 on June 21, 1839, at Uxbridge.

== Hon. Bazaleel Taft House ==
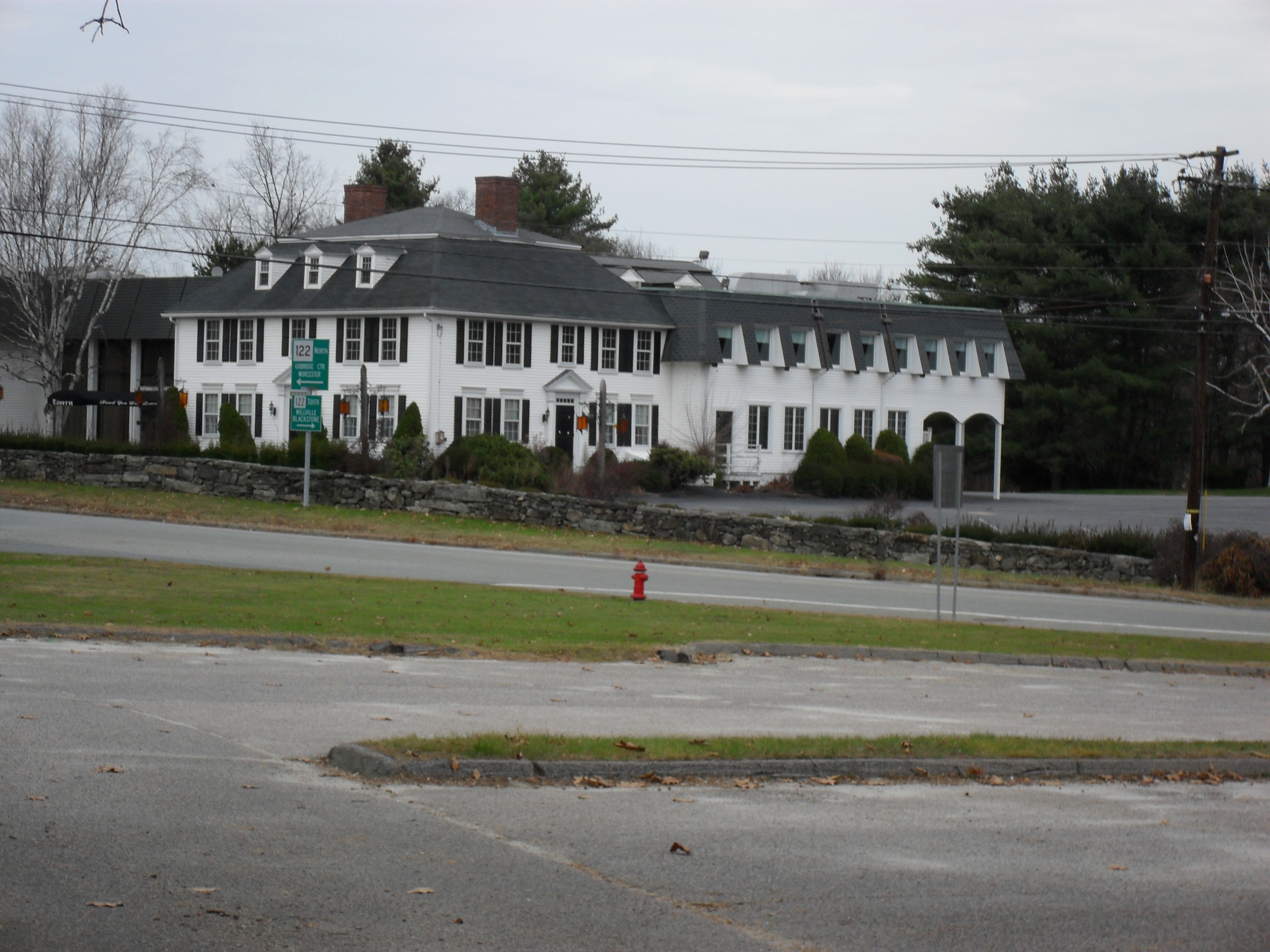
Hon. Bazaleel Taft House, Uxbridge, Massachusetts, built in 1794, on the National Register of Historic Places listings in Uxbridge, Massachusetts

The Hon. Bazaleel Taft House, built in 1794, is a Georgian architectural style house, that is today a restaurant south of Uxbridge center. A Hessian sword was embedded in the wall of this home, as partial evidence that British Hessian forces, once passed through the historic Blackstone River Valley during the American Revolutionary War.

== Bibliography ==
- Baldwin, Thomas W. (Thomas Williams) (1916). Vital records of Uxbridge, Massachusetts, to the year 1850. Boston, Massachusetts: Wright & Potter printing company.
- Sprague, Beatrice Putnam, ed. (1927). Uxbridge year by year, 1727-1927. Woonsocket, Rhode Island: E.L. Freeman.
