= Samuel Taft =

American militiaman (1735–1816)

- Born: September 23, 1735; Upton, Province of Massachusetts
- Died: August 2, 1816 (aged 80); Uxbridge, Massachusetts, U.S.
- Relatives: Israel Taft
- Military career
- Allegiance: United States
- Service years: 1775–1780
- Rank: Private
- Nickname: Taft Tavern
- Units: Worcester 9th Company, Capt. Thaddeus Read's co., Col. Nathan Tyler's regt
- Conflicts: Battles of Lexington and Concord, American Revolution
- Other work: Tavern proprietor and farmer; hosted President George Washington on inaugural tour; father of 22

Samuel Taft (September 23, 1735 – August 2, 1816) was a Revolutionary War soldier who later hosted his former commander in Chief, President George Washington, at his home, on his inaugural tour of New England.

== Early life ==
Samuel was the son of Israel Taft, and Mercy Aldrich, both of whom were from Mendon, Massachusetts.

Taft was an American Revolutionary War soldier from Uxbridge, Massachusetts. The vital records of Uxbridge, records that Samuel Taft had intentions to marry Mary Murdock on December 16, 1758. The vital records of Uxbridge, record that a number of his children, including Frederick, Marcy, Merret, Otice, Perley, Sibbel and George S. were born to Samuel and Mary Taft. His wife Mary died after 28 years of marriage in 1785. Samuel married Experience Humes January 9, 1786, at Uxbridge, Ma; died August 2, 1816, at Uxbridge, Ma, at age 80.

== Service in Revolutionary War ==
Taft served in the American Revolutionary War as a private with a company from Worcester County. He served in Capt. Thaddeus Read's co., Col. Nathan Tyler's regt.

== Visit from George Washington ==
In 1789, Samuel Taft was the proprietor of a tavern in Uxbridge. This tavern is now known as Samuel Taft House. Newly elected President of the United States, George Washington, stayed one evening with Taft and his family during his inaugural trip through New England. The President wrote a letter to Taft, from his next stop, on November 8 at Hartford, thanking him for his service and giving some gifts to Samuel's daughters.

November 8, 1789.

Sir:

Being informed that you have given my name to one of your sons, and called another after Mrs. Washington's family, and being moreover very much pleased with the modest and innocent looks of your two daughters, Patty and Polly, I do for these reasons send each of these girls a piece of chintz; and to Patty, who bears the name of Mrs. Washington, and who waited more upon us than Polly did, I send five guineas, with which she may buy herself any little ornament she may want, or she may dispose of them in any other manner more agreeable to herself. As I do not give these things with a view to having it talked of, or even to its being known, the less there is said about the matter the better you will please me; but, that I may be sure the chintz and money have got safe to hand, let Patty, who I dare say is equal to it, write me a line informing me thereof, directed to 'The President of the United States at New York.' I wish you and your family well, and am,

etc. Yours,
:
George Washington

– Letter to Mr. Samuel Taft, written from Hartford on November 8, 1789

It is possible that President George Washington refers to Perley in his letter as "Polly" and one of the other girls as "Patty". These could have been their nicknames and not their given names.

== Samuel Taft House ==
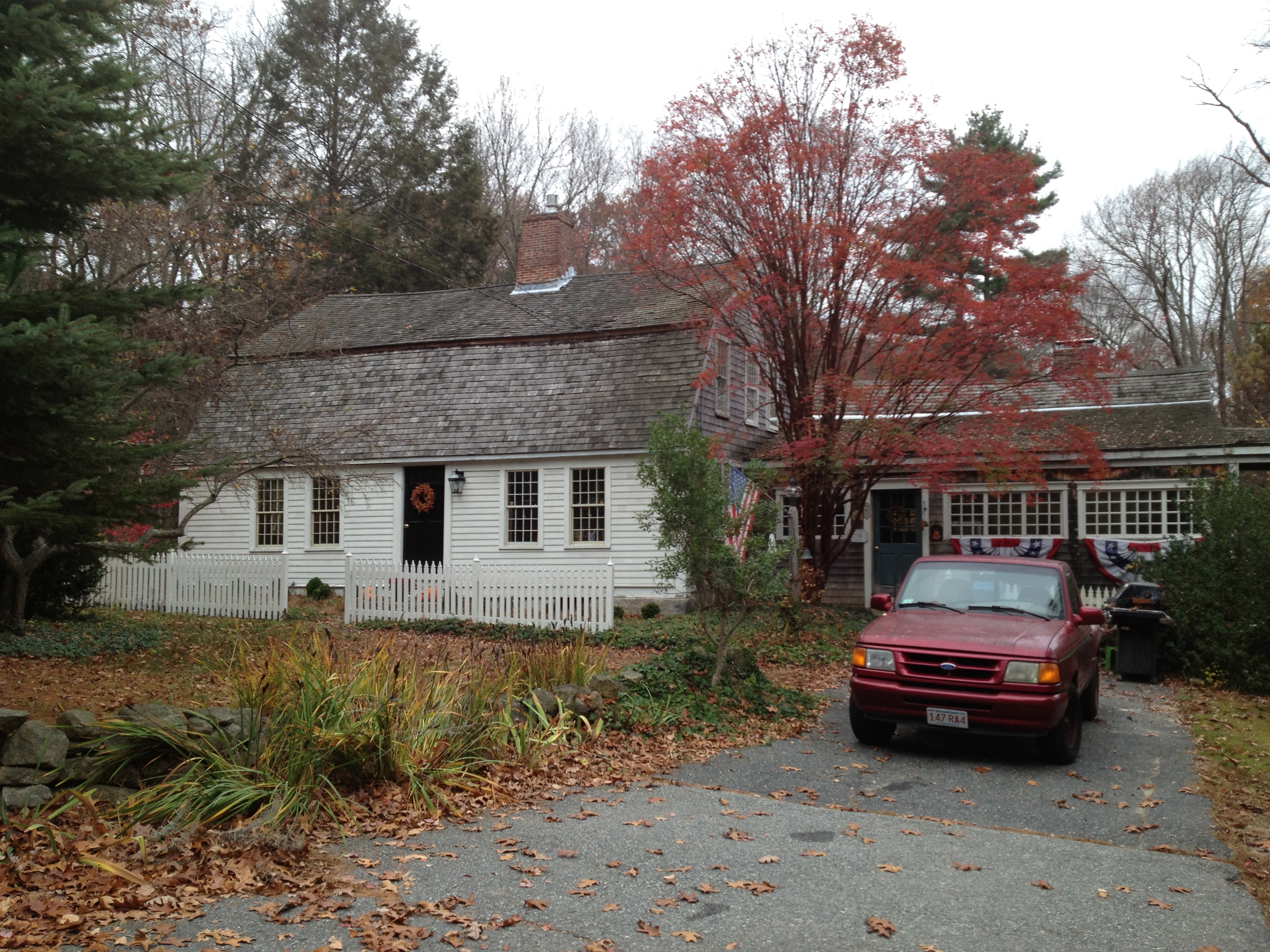
Taft's home; Washington slept here on November 8, 1789

The Samuel Taft House is listed on the National Register of Historic Places . William Howard Taft, also stayed here in 1910.

== Family ==
The Taft family from Uxbridge and Mendon, has produced a line of politicians throughout the US, including President William Howard Taft.

== Death ==
Samuel Taft died on August 2, 1816, at the age of 80.
