= Robert Taft Sr. =

Early American immigrant of the Taft family

- Born: Robert Taft c. 1640; British Isles
- Died: February 8, 1725 (aged 84–85); Mendon, Massachusetts Bay
- Other name: Robert Taffe
- Spouse: Sarah or Savill Simpson
- Children: Thomas; Robert; Daniel; Joseph; Benjamin

Robert Taft Sr., also Robert Taffe (c. August 1640 – February 8, 1725), was the first Taft in the United States and the founder of the American Taft family. Believed to be of Scottish heritage, (Note: According to Leonard, Taft descended from the Taffe family in Scotland. Due to divided political loyalties in Scotland during the reign of Charles II (1660–1685), the family separated to England, Ireland, and Bohemia. It is believed that Robert Taft's ancestor went to England. Another Taft, Matthew, who immigrated to New England after Robert Taft, is from the Taft family that went to Ireland. Leonard states: There is a tradition that he [Taft] was an adherent of the commonwealth, a Scotch Puritan, disgusted with the Cavaliers, and that in the troublous times consequent upon the rule of Charles the Second, he sought refuge from civil and religious tyranny in the forests of New England, — that he had been in the country longer than any extant records show, and had even been in Mendon before the Indian War. All this was possible. He was of age in 1660 when Charles II gained control of the British government, and had opportunity to be disgusted, and perhaps terrified, by the misgovernment and tyranny, civil and religious, of that monarch. The agitation in Scotland between the years 1660 and 1676, was full of annoyance and alarm. All that can be said of the tradition is, that no record has been found showing that Robert Taft was in this country prior to 1678. The distance in time is not so great as to take away all the force of statements handed down from fathers to sons, and so far as this tradition makes Scotland the place from which Robert first came, it is probably correct. There is also a theory that the Tafts came from England or Scotland to Ireland in the 13th century.) Taft left the British Isles to settle in the Massachusetts Bay Colony in the 1670s. Living first in Braintree, he settled in Mendon in 1680 and was a leading citizen and wealthy landholder, who was instrumental in the growth of the town.

== Colonist ==
=== Braintree ===
Robert Taft Sr. was born about 1640. He immigrated from England, (Note: Bazaleel Taft Sr. wrote in a letter in 1837 that his great-grandfather, Daniel Taft, came to the colonies from England.) Scotland, or Ireland, to the American colonies after King Philip's War (1675–1676). Matthew Taft, who later settled in the colonies, is reportedly Taft's brother or another family member. Matthew Taft came to the colonies from Ireland in 1728 and settled in what is now Upton, Massachusetts.

Taft was married to Sarah or Savill (née Simpson) of Boston, born about 1640. She was a cordwainer, a shoemaker. The Tafts and their son Thomas, and possibly Robert and Daniel, settled in Braintree, near Boston, by 1677 or 1678. (Note: Braintree is now Quincy, Massachusetts.) They had a house, barn, 20 acres of land, and an orchard. (Note: He was identified as Robert Taffe in a deed for a lot adjoining his property dated October 19, 1678.) Taft was a housebuilder, also called housewright, and a carpenter.

Planning to move to Mendon, as other settlers who survived the war were returning to the area, they purchased the farm of Colonel William Crowne on August 16, 1679. (Note: Or on August 15, 1679.) They sold their property in Braintree on November 18, 1679 (Note: Crane states that Taft moved to Mendon in 1669. He also says that Taft came to the American colonies in 1679 or 1680.) to Caleb Norton, Nobart, or Hobart.

=== Mendon ===
Taft and his family likely moved to Mendon by the spring of 1680 with other settlers. The 40 acres of land that they purchased was on two sides of a road. Since Taft and Sarah (Savill in the deed) both paid for the land, they each had 20 acres, which was documented in a deed made on July 29, 1680. Sarah owned the parcel called Pondfield. On the other side of the road was a fort that had been built before the war. Called Fortfield, this was where Taft established a homestead for his family. (Note: According to Alphonso Taft's biography, Taft settled near East Hartford Avenue, in present-day Uxbridge.) Taft later purchased land surrounding the Taft Pond, also called Mendon Pond. The property was in Mendham, the old English spelling of Mendon, in what is now Uxbridge.

The previous landowner, Colonel William Crowne, reportedly left the area during King Philip's War, and did not return. Taft was elected to the board of selectman in February and April 1680. He was integral in the construction of a church and a house for the minister. Taft served the community in a number of offices and as committee members. He was considered a "man of wealth and standing". Some of his neighbors disagreed with his trading with Native Americans, and lodged a complaint with the General Court on May 27, 1682.

Touching Robert Taffe, the person complayned of for irregular trading with the Indeans, that matter is wholly left to the County Court of Suffolk to doe therein as they shall judge meet unto whom the peticoners may apply themselves for releife.

Taft and three of his sons built the first bridge over the Great River, now called Blackstone River, in 1709. Taft's son Joseph planned with other members of the town to build a road west of the Great River beginning in 1727. The road crossed over Benjamin Taft's land and 16 acres of Taft's land. According to town meeting notes, Taft's heirs were to build the bridge over the river and maintain it over seven years. The arrangement called for the Tafts to be paid 60 pounds upon successful completion of the bridge. In 1729, they built another bridge.

Taft died on February 8, 1725. Sarah died in November 1725.

== Marriage and children ==
Taft and his wife Sarah (née Simpson) had five children:

- Thomas Taft, born 1671, in the "old country", and married Deborah Genery, a daughter of Isaac of Dedham. They had eleven children.
- Robert Taft Jr., born 1674, married Elizabeth Woodard. He was among the first of Uxbridge's Board of Selectmen, serving in 1727. He and his wife had eleven children.
- Daniel Taft, born 1677, in England or Braintree, married Hannah (maiden name unknown) and Lydia Chapin, daughter of Captain Josiah Chapin. Daniel was a farmer, lawyer, town treasurer, justice of the peace, colonial legislator, and a leading citizen.
- Joseph Taft, born 1680, married Elizabeth Emerson and they had nine children.
- Benjamin Taft, 1684, married Sarah Thomas

Taft purchased sufficient adjoining land, said to be two and a half square miles, so that his sons and their families had ample portions of the Taft homestead. Some of the land extended into what is now the town of Sutton.

== Descendants ==
Robert Taft's descendants are a large politically active family with descendants who are prominent in Ohio, but live throughout the United States.

A descendant of Robert Taft Sr., William Howard Taft, became the President of the United States, and Chief Justice of the U.S. Supreme Court. Robert Taft Sr.'s grandson Josiah Taft died prematurely, at the age of 47, and his widow, Lydia Taft, became America's first woman voter in 1756.

== Bibliography ==
- Crane, Ellery Bicknell (1907). Historic Homes and Institutions and Genealogical and Personal Memories of Worcester County, Massachusetts with a history of Worcester Society of Antiquity. Vol. 1. Chicago and New York: Lewis. (archive.org)
- Crane, Ellery Bicknell (1907). Historic Homes and Institutions and Genealogical and Personal Memories of Worcester County, Massachusetts with a history of Worcester Society of Antiquity. Vol. 2. Chicago and New York: Lewis. (google.com)
- Leonard, Lewis Alexander (1920). Life of Alphonso Taft. New York: Hawke Publishing Company, Inc.
- Washburn, Mabel Thacher Rosemary (1908). Ancestry of William Howard Taft. New York: Frank Allaben Genealogical Company.
