= George S. Taft =

District attorney of Worcester County, Massachusetts
- In office 1905–1910
- Preceded by: Rockwood Hoar
- Succeeded by: James A. Stiles

Personal details
- Born: November 14, 1859 Uxbridge, Massachusetts, U.S.
- Died: April 30, 1940 (aged 80) Uxbridge, Massachusetts, U.S.
- Party: Republican
- Spouse: Nancy Hall (m. 1913)
- Education: Brown University
- Occupation: Attorney

George Spring Taft (November 14, 1859 – April 30, 1940) was an American attorney who was the district attorney of Worcester County, Massachusetts from 1904 to 1910.

== Early life ==
Taft was born on November 14, 1859 in Uxbridge, Massachusetts. He was the grandson of Bezaleel Taft Jr. Taft graduated from Brown University in 1882.

== Career ==
From 1883 to 1887, Taft was clerk of the United States Senate Committee on Privileges and Elections as well as the private secretary to Senator George F. Hoar. He was admitted to the Massachusetts bar in 1887 after private study. He was an assistant district attorney from 1887 to 1905 and district attorney from 1905 to 1911. From 1900 until his death, Taft was a member of the Massachusetts board of bar examiners.

Taft also maintained a law practice with George R. Stobbs. In 1921, Taft was the counsel for a special legislative committee investigating irregularities involving the passage of legislation related to the Boston Elevated Railway.

== Personal life and death ==
In 1913, Taft married Nancy Hall of London. Following his father's death, he inherited the home built for his grandfather in Uxbridge. He also maintained a residence in Worcester. Taft died on April 30, 1940 at his home in Uxbridge following an illness of two weeks.
