= Josiah Taft =

American politician

- Born: April 2, 1709; Mendon, Massachusetts
- Died: September 29, 1756 (aged 47) (Note: There are sources that state that Josiah Taft died on September 30, 1756, but Vital Records for Massachusetts showed that he died on September 29, 1756.); Uxbridge, Massachusetts
- Spouse: Lydia Taft (Note: Both Josiah's mother, the daughter of Captain Josiah Chapin, and his wife, the daughter of Seth and Bethia Chapin, were Lydia Chapin before their marriages.)
- Children: Bazaleel Taft Sr. and seven other children
- Parent(s): Daniel and Lydia Taft

Josiah Taft (April 2, 1709 – September 29, 1756) was a wealthy landowner and legislator in Uxbridge, Massachusetts. He performed several roles within the community and served with the Uxbridge Militia. Attaining the rank of captain, he fought during the French and Indian Wars. Upon Taft's death, his wife Lydia Taft became the wealthiest person in Uxbridge and under the premise of "no taxation without representation" was the first woman to vote in America.

== Early life ==
Josiah was born on April 2, 1709, at Mendon, Province of Massachusetts Bay, the son of Daniel and Lydia (née Chapin) Taft, who were married on December 5, 1706. Lydia was the daughter of Captain Josiah Chapin. Josiah's father Daniel, had been a local "squire", town treasurer, moderator, justice of the peace, and legal advisor to his family. His siblings were Daniel, Japhet, David, Caleb, and Abigail. Josiah grew up in the Mendon, and became a resident of Uxbridge in 1732.

Taft descended from Robert Taft Sr. (1640 or before – February 8, 1725) of Braintree, Massachusetts, his grandfather of the Taft family. Robert Taft Sr. established his family in Mendon, in what later became the town of Uxbridge, where he built a fort. Robert was a carpenter and a farmer. William Howard Taft, President of the United States, was from this same family.

== Marriage and children ==
Taft married Lydia Chapin of Mendon, on December 28, 1731, and becoming Lydia Chapin Taft. Lydia and Josiah then settled in Uxbridge, (Note: They settled in Uxbridge, because that is where Josiah lived from 1732 on.) about 4.5 miles (7.2 km) southwest of Mendon. It is possible that when they settled in Uxbridge that they then joined the only Uxbridge church, a Congregational church, gathered in 1727, and mentioned first in a list of new Congregational parishes in the Great Awakening of 1731. Josiah and Lydia went on to have a family of 8 children between 1732 and 1753, including Bazaleel Taft Sr., born November 3, 1750, Caleb, Joel, and Eunice, who married Mr. Stowell, and after he died, Samuel Curtis Jr.

== Adult life ==
Josiah was a farmer and soldier, and Lydia was a colonial mother and homemaker. Josiah became a prominent citizen in early Uxbridge. He was a farmer, local official, and Massachusetts legislator. Josiah went on to serve a number of terms as a member of the Board of Selectmen, as town clerk, and as town moderator. Josiah served in the Massachusetts General Court. House of Representatives, 1753. Lydia and Josiah were among the wealthiest families in Uxbridge.

Taft was originally known as Ensign Josiah Taft in the Uxbridge Militia, and later as Lieutenant, and then Captain Josiah Taft in the French and Indian War. Josiah served as the Uxbridge town moderator. He presided over the proceedings of the New England style open town meeting. It is later reported, that Josiah Taft became the largest taxpayer in the town of Uxbridge in 1756. In the fall of 1756, Josiah and Lydia's son, Caleb, became ill, while studying at Harvard College, and died on September 19. Josiah went to Boston and Cambridge to bury Caleb.

Josiah himself became ill after returning home, and died on September 29, 1756, at Uxbridge, Massachusetts at age 47. It was reported that he left a good estate with bonds and a will.

Lydia became the largest landholder in Uxbridge and based upon the principal of "no taxation without representation, she was made a voter by proxy, America's first woman voter. (Note: The event was recorded by a book written by Henry Chapin and edited by Rushton Dashwood Burr, but it is not recorded in the town's records. She was recognized as America's first woman vote when Route 146A was designated the Lydia Taft Highway by the Massachusetts legislature in 2004.) On October 30, 1756, an important open town meeting was held to decide whether to support the French and Indian War effort. Her vote settled what would otherwise have been a tie. The town would provide financial support for the war. Lydia died November 9, 1778.

== Bibliography ==
- Baldwin, Thomas W. (Thomas Williams) (1916). Vital records of Uxbridge, Massachusetts, to the year 1850. Boston, Massachusetts: Wright & Potter printing company.
- Chapin, Henry (1881). Address delivered at the Unitarian church, in Uxbridge, Mass., in 1864. Worcester, Massachusetts: Press of C. Hamilton.
- Clarke, Joseph S. (1858). A Historical Sketch of the Congregational Churches in Massachusetts, from 1620 to 1858. Boston (Digitized by Google books): Congregational Board of Publication. p. 148.
- Crane, Ellery Bicknell (1907). Historic Homes and Institutions and Genealogical and Personal Memories of Worcester County, Massachusetts with a history of Worcester Society of Antiquity. Vol. 1. Chicago and New York: Lewis. (archive.org)
- Crane, Ellery Bicknell (1907). Historic Homes and Institutions and Genealogical and Personal Memories of Worcester County, Massachusetts with a history of Worcester Society of Antiquity. Vol. 2. Chicago and New York: Lewis. (google.com)
- Sprague, Beatrice Putnam, ed. (1927). Uxbridge year by year, 1727-1927. Woonsocket, Rhode Island: E.L. Freeman.
