= Samuel Taft House =

Historic house in Massachusetts, United States

- U.S. National Register of Historic Places
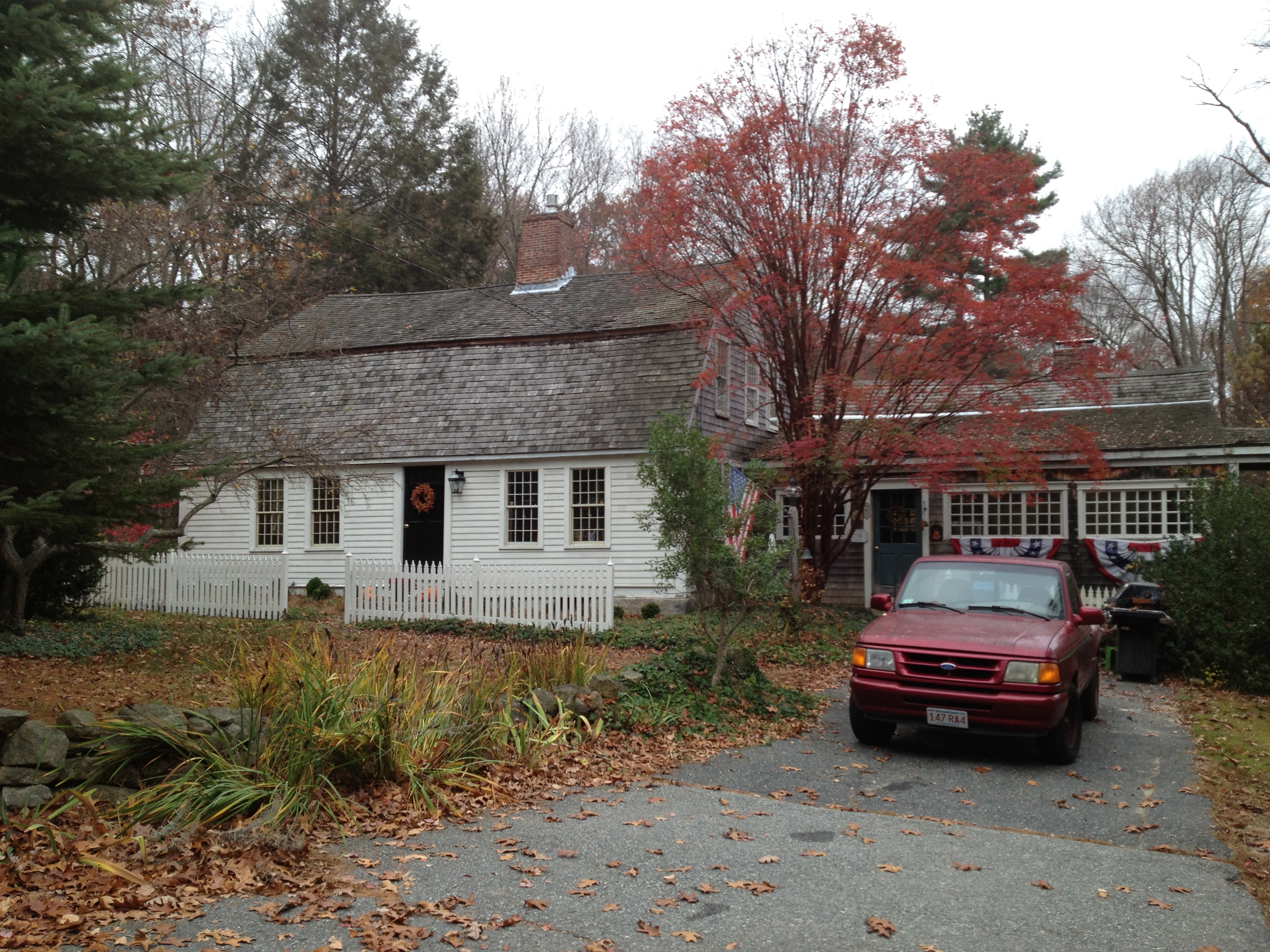

- Location within Massachusetts Location within the United States
- Location: 87 Sutton St., Uxbridge, Massachusetts
- Coordinates: 42°5′28″N 71°39′21″W
- Area: 1 acre (0.40 ha)
- Built: 1774
- MPS: Uxbridge MRA
- NRHP reference No.: 83004140
- Added to NRHP: October 7, 1983

The Samuel Taft House is a historic house at 87 Sutton Street in Uxbridge, Massachusetts. The main block of the 1 1/2 story timber-frame house was built in 1774, and is a typical local variant of Georgian styling, with a gambrel roof, central chimney, clapboard siding, and granite foundation. The house is notable for its association with Samuel Taft, who served in the American Revolutionary War, and hosted George Washington at this house in 1789.

The house was listed on the National Register of Historic Places in 1983.

== See also ==
- National Register of Historic Places listings in Uxbridge, Massachusetts
