= Lydia Taft =

Early American colonist

- Born: Lydia Chapin; February 2, 1712; Mendon, Massachusetts Colony, British America
- Died: November 9, 1778 (aged 66); Uxbridge, Massachusetts State Revolutionary United States
- Known for: America's first woman voter
- Spouse: Josiah Taft
- Children: Bazaleel Taft Sr. and seven other children
- Parent(s): Seth and Bethia Chapin

Lydia Taft (née Chapin; February 2, 1712 – November 9, 1778) was the first woman known to legally vote in colonial America. This occurred at a town meeting in the New England town of Uxbridge in Massachusetts Colony, on October 30, 1756.

== Early life ==
Lydia Chapin was born in Mendon, Worcester County, Massachusetts, on February 2, 1712. She was the daughter of Bethia (née Thurston) and Seth Chapin, who was a respected member of the community and a captain in the militia. Her mother gave birth to 14 children. Lydia grew up with nine siblings on 45 acres (180,000 m^{2}) near the Post's Lane bridge and Mill River in Mendon. Her father owned property in what is today Milford, South Hopedale, and Mendon.

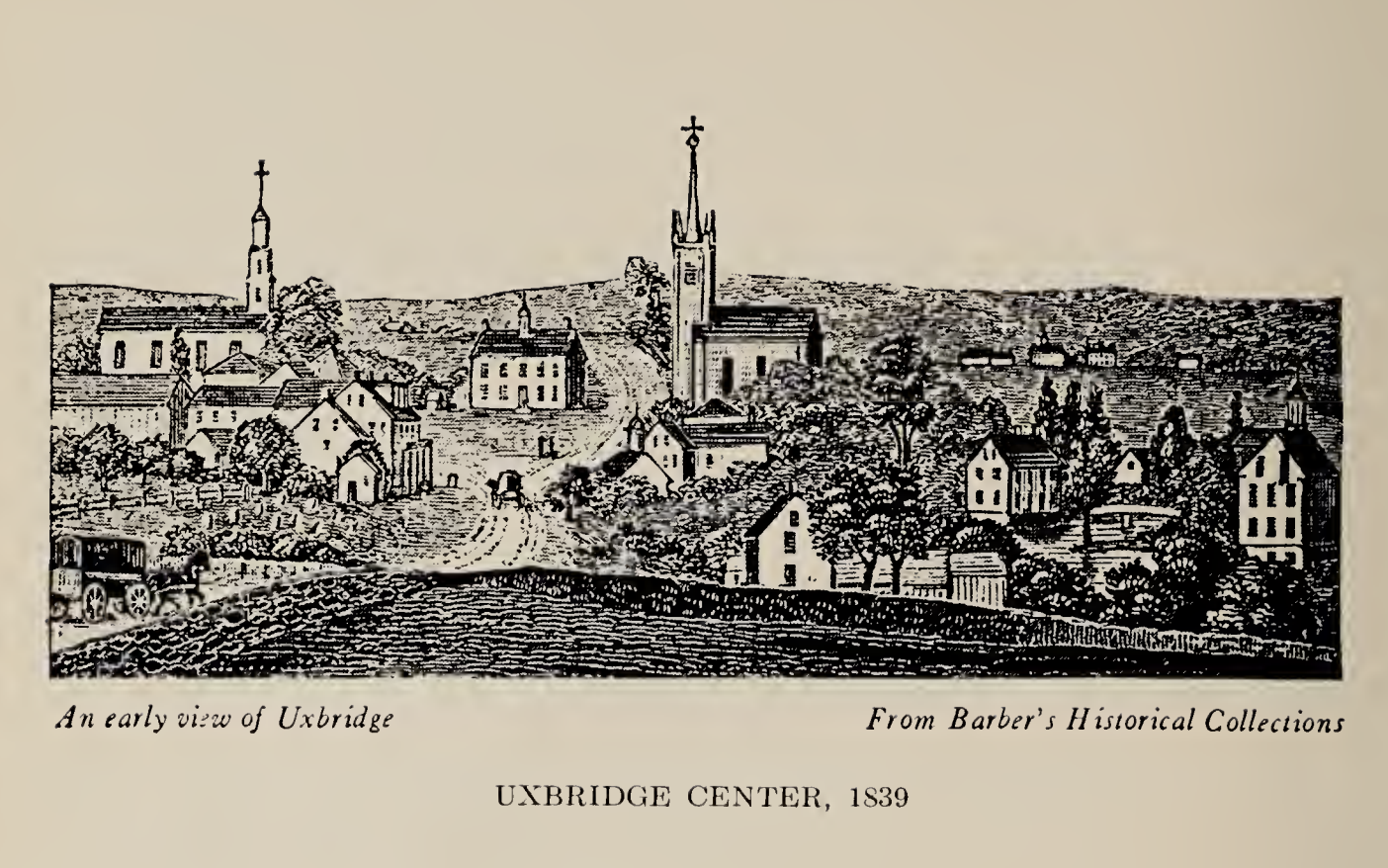
Uxbridge Center, Massachusetts, 1839

In 1727, the western part of Mendon became the newly incorporated town of Uxbridge. Mendon and Uxbridge were rural communities in central Massachusetts. In 1731, these communities became part of the new county of Worcester County.

== Marriage and children ==
Lydia Chapin was married to Josiah Taft, on December 28, 1731, in Mendon, becoming Lydia Taft, at the Congregational Church.

The Tafts settled in Uxbridge and had eight children: Josiah (b. May 10, 1733), Ebenezer (b. August 20, 1735), Caleb (b. January 15, 1738 or 1739), Asahel (b. April 23, 1740), Joel (b. August 15, 1742), Joel (b. February 19, 1748 or 1749), Bazaleel (b. November 3, 1750), and Chloe (b. June 7, 1753).

Josiah became a prominent citizen in early Uxbridge as a wealthy farmer, local official, member of the militia, and Massachusetts legislator. He served several terms as a member of the Board of Selectmen, as town clerk, as town moderator, and in the Massachusetts General Court (1753). Josiah became the largest taxpayer in the town of Uxbridge in 1756.

In the fall of 1756, Taft's and Josiah's 18-year-old son, Caleb, became ill while studying at Harvard and died on September 19. After traveling to Cambridge to bury Caleb, Josiah himself became ill and died on September 30, at age 47—leaving behind a significant estate.

== Vote ==
Taft became the largest landholder in Uxbridge and based upon the principal of "no taxation without representation, she was made a voter by proxy, America's first woman voter. (Note: The event was recorded by a book written by Henry Chapin and edited by Rushton Dashwood Burr, but it is not recorded in the town's records. She was recognized as America's first woman vote when Route 146A was designated the Lydia Taft Highway by the Massachusetts legislature in 2004.) Another factor was that her eldest living son Bazaleel was still a minor.

On October 30, 1756, an important open town meeting was held to decide whether to support the French and Indian War effort. Taft's vote settled what would otherwise have been a tie. The town would provide financial support for the war. Taft appeared at and may have voted at two other official Uxbridge Town meetings, in 1758 and 1765. Taft's historic vote preceded the constitutional amendment for women's suffrage by 164 years.

== Death and legacy ==
Taft died at Uxbridge on November 9, 1778, during the American Revolutionary War (April 19, 1775 – September 3, 1783).

Judge Henry Chapin proclaimed in an 1864 address to the Unitarian church, that, "Uxbridge may yet become famous as the pioneer in the cause of women's suffrage". Chapin's claim for Taft as the first woman voter has been disputed by recent historians. Taft's role in the history of women's suffrage has been recognized by the Massachusetts legislature since 2004, when it named Massachusetts Route 146A, from Uxbridge to the Rhode Island border, in her honor.

== See also ==
- Taft family
- Nineteenth Amendment to the United States Constitution
- Women's suffrage in the United States
- Feminism in the United States
- Timeline of women's suffrage

== Bibliography ==
- Baldwin, Thomas W. (Thomas Williams) (1916). Vital records of Uxbridge, Massachusetts, to the year 1850. Boston, Massachusetts: Wright & Potter printing company.
- Chapin, Henry (1881). Address delivered at the Unitarian church, in Uxbridge, Mass., in 1864. Worcester, Massachusetts: Press of C. Hamilton.
- Crane, Ellery Bicknell (1907). Historic Homes and Institutions and Genealogical and Personal Memories of Worcester County, Massachusetts with a history of Worcester Society of Antiquity. Vol. 1. Chicago and New York: Lewis. (archive.org)
- Crane, Ellery Bicknell (1907). Historic Homes and Institutions and Genealogical and Personal Memories of Worcester County, Massachusetts with a history of Worcester Society of Antiquity. Vol. 2. Chicago and New York: Lewis. (google.com)
- Sprague, Beatrice Putnam, ed. (1927). Uxbridge year by year, 1727-1927. Woonsocket, Rhode Island: E.L. Freeman.
