= Greater Los Angeles =

Metropolitan area in California, United States

- Megacity and Combined Statistical Area
- Los Angeles–Long Beach, CA CSA
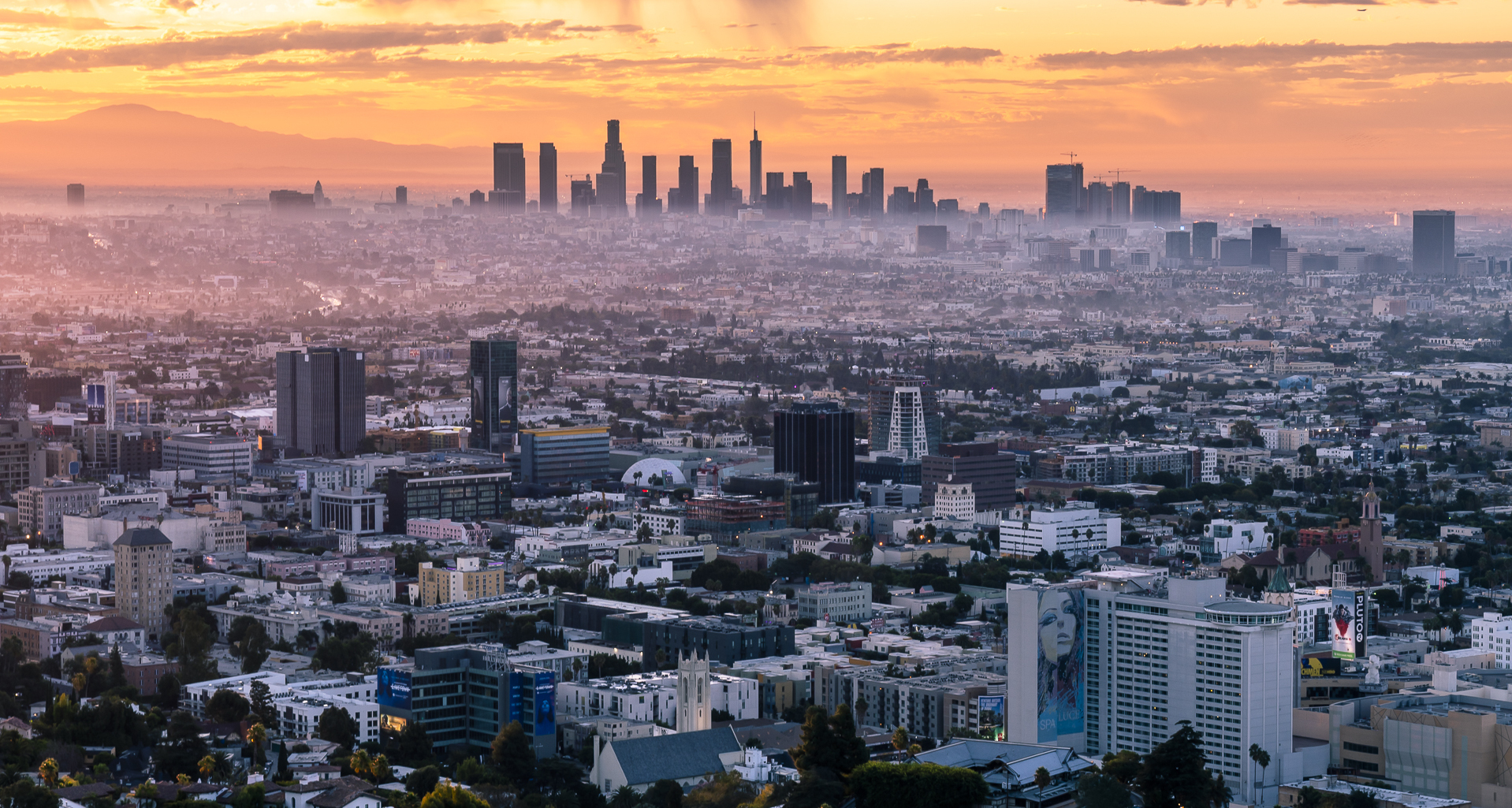
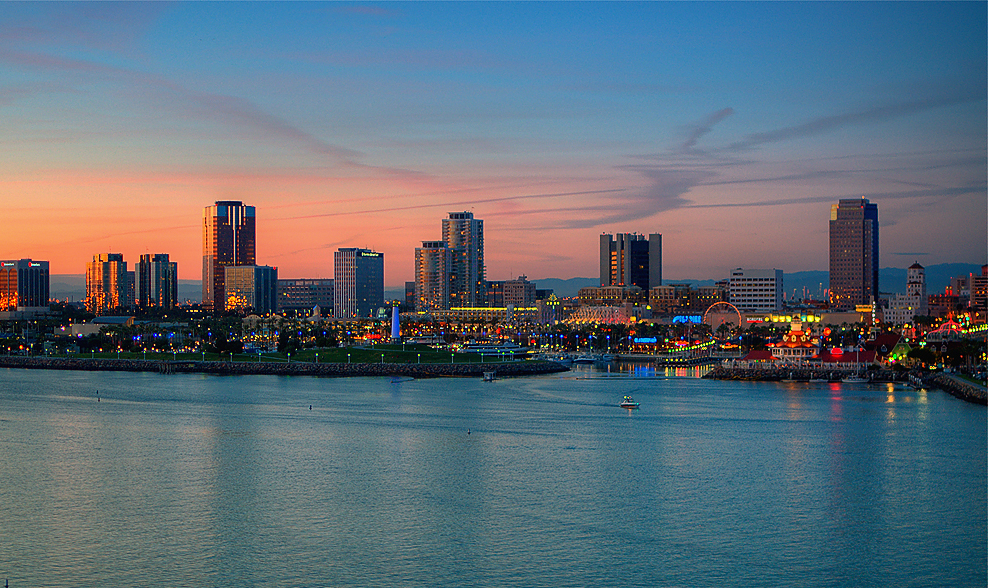
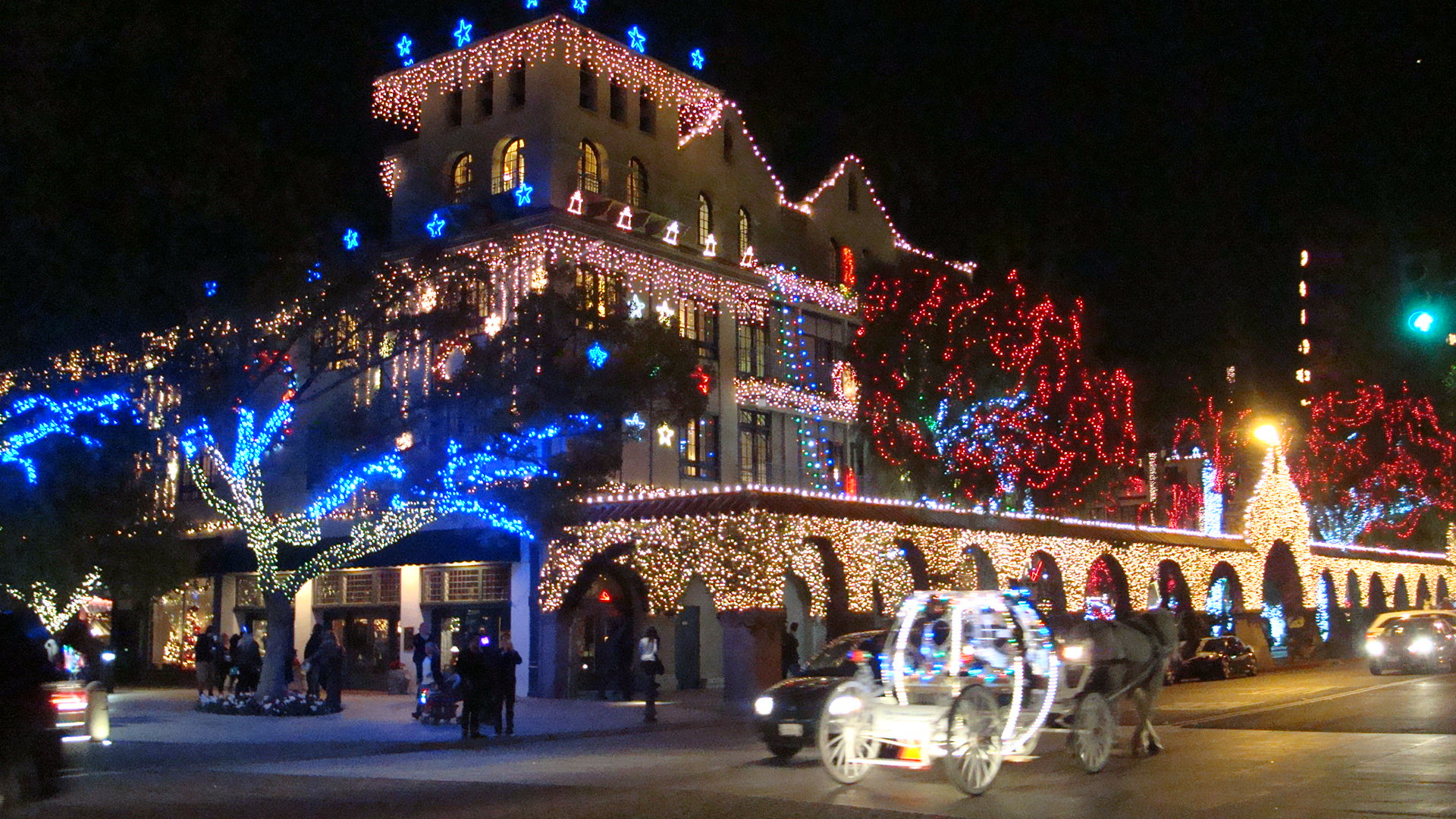
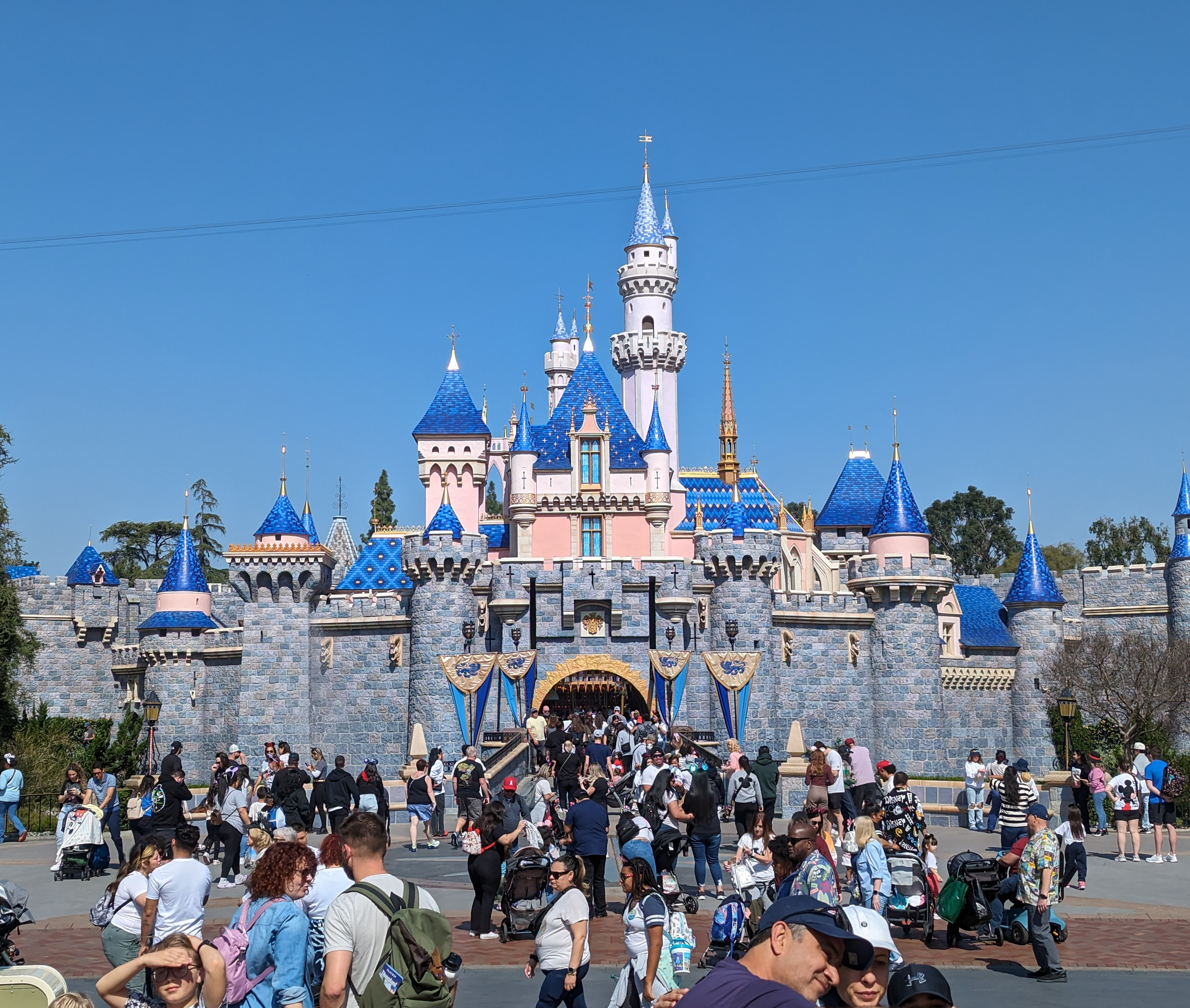
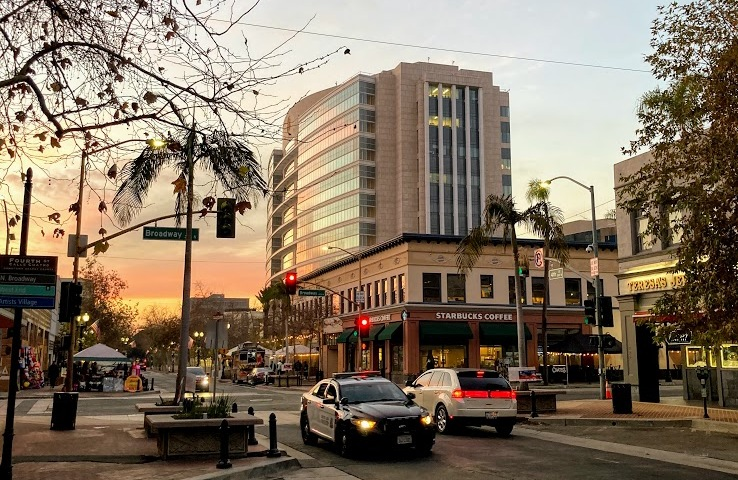
- Los Angeles Long Beach Riverside Anaheim Santa Ana

- Los Angeles Metropolitan Area by Sentinel-2, ESA

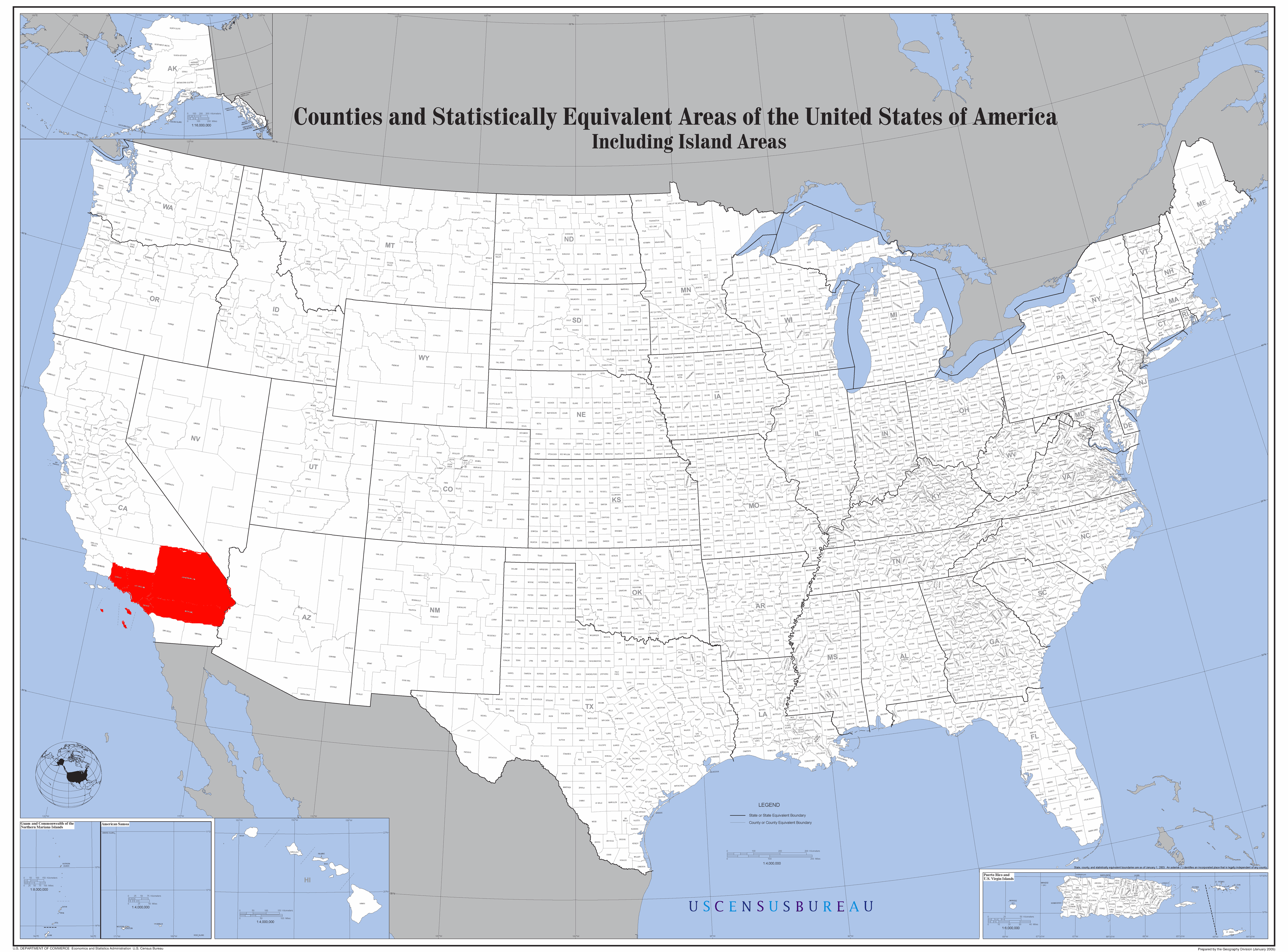
- Counties in Greater Los Angeles
- Coordinates: 34.0°N 118.2°W
- Country: United States
- State: California
- Principal city: Los Angeles
- Other major cities (pop. over 200,000): Metropolitan Los Angeles Anaheim Fontana Glendale Irvine Long Beach Moreno Valley Santa Ana Burbank Santa Monica Beverly Hills Santa Clarita Ventura County Oxnard Inland Empire Riverside San Bernardino

Area
  - CSA: 33,950 sq mi (87,940 km^{2})
  - Urban: 2,281.0 sq mi (5,907.8 km^{2})
- Highest elevation: 11,503 ft (3,506 m)
- Lowest elevation: 0 ft (0 m)

Population (2023)
  - CSA: 18,316,743
  - Rank: 2nd in the US
  - Density: 539.5/sq mi (208.3/km^{2})

GDP (2024)
  - CSA: $1.697 trillion
  - Per capita: $92,647
- Time zone: UTC−8 (Pacific)
  - Summer (DST): UTC−7 (PDT)
- Area codes: 213/323, 310/424, 562, 626, 661, 714/657, 760/442, 805/820, 818/747, 909/840, 949, 951

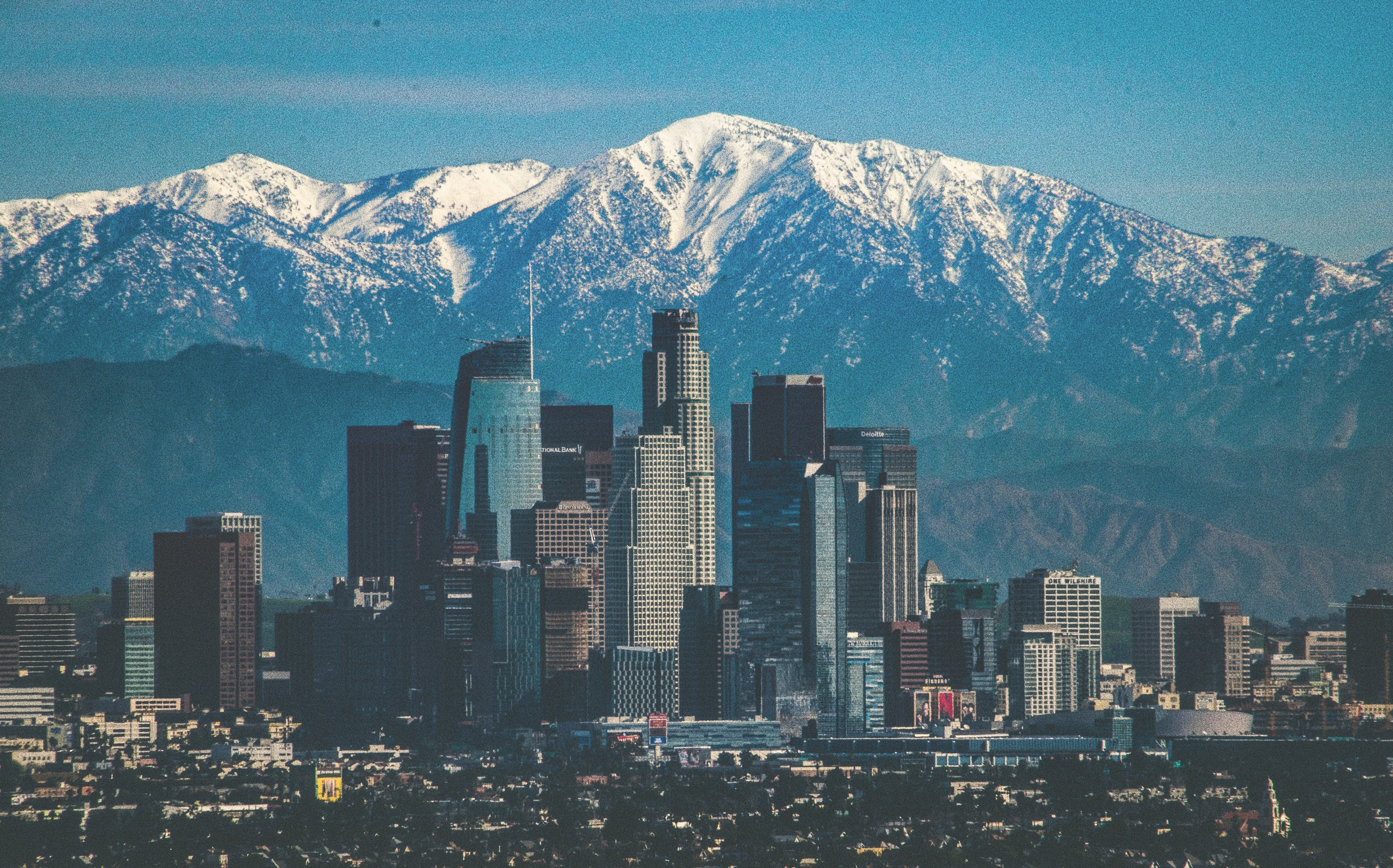

Greater Los Angeles is the most populous metropolitan area in the U.S. state of California, encompassing five counties in Southern California extending from Ventura County in the west to San Bernardino County and Riverside County in the east, with the city of Los Angeles and Los Angeles County at its center, and Orange County to the southeast. The Los Angeles–Long Beach combined statistical area (CSA) covers 33,954 square miles (87,940 km^{2}), making it the largest metropolitan region in the United States by land area. The contiguous urban area is 2,281 square miles (5,910 km^{2}), whereas the remainder mostly consists of mountain and desert areas. With an estimated population of over 18.3 million (U.S. Census Bureau, 2023), it is the second-largest metropolitan area in the country, behind New York, as well as one of the largest megacities in the world.

In addition to being the nexus of the global entertainment industry, including films, television, and recorded music, Greater Los Angeles is also an important center of international trade, education, media, business, tourism, technology, and sports. It is the third-largest metropolitan area by nominal GDP in the world with an economy exceeding $1 trillion in output, behind New York City and Tokyo.

There are three contiguous component urban areas in Greater Los Angeles: the Inland Empire, which can be broadly defined as Riverside and San Bernardino counties; the Ventura/Oxnard metropolitan area (Ventura County); and the Los Angeles metropolitan area (also known as Metropolitan Los Angeles or Metro LA) consisting of Los Angeles and Orange counties only. The Census Bureau designates the latter as the Los Angeles–Long Beach–Anaheim metropolitan statistical area (MSA), the fourth largest metropolitan area in the Western Hemisphere and the second-largest metropolitan area in the United States, by population of 13 million as of the 2020 U.S. census. It has a total area of 4,850 square miles (12,561 km^{2}). Although San Diego–Tijuana borders the Greater Los Angeles area at San Clemente and Temecula, it is not part of it as the two urban areas are not geographically contiguous due to the presence of Camp Pendleton. However, both form part of the Southern California megalopolis which extends into Tijuana, Baja California, Mexico.

== Definitions ==
The Los Angeles–Long Beach, CA Combined Statistical Area as defined by the U.S. Office of Management and Budget. Los Angeles–Long Beach–Anaheim, CA MSA Riverside–San Bernardino–Ontario, CA MSA Oxnard–Thousand Oaks–Ventura, CA MSA

	Area (km^{2})	Population (2024)	GDP (million US$, 2024)	GDP per capita (US$)
Los Angeles–Long Beach–Anaheim, CA (MSA)	12,580	12,906,895	1,354,718	104,961
Riverside–San Bernardino–Ontario, CA (MSA)	70,610	4,747,876	272,671	57,430
Oxnard–Thousand Oaks–Ventura, CA (MSA)	4,770	833,431	69,606	83,517
Los Angeles–Long Beach, CA CSA	87,960	18,488,202	1,696,995	91,788

=== Los Angeles metropolitan area ===
Los Angeles Metropolitan Area
- Metropolitan Statistical Area
- Los Angeles–Long Beach–Anaheim, CA MSA
- Coordinates: 34°03′N 118°15′W
- Country: United States
- State(s): California
- Largest city: Los Angeles
- Area: 4,850.3 sq mi (12,562 km^{2})
- Highest elevation: 10,064 ft (3,067.5 m)
- Lowest elevation: −9.8 ft (−3 m)
- Population (2023): 12,799,100
  - Rank: 2nd in the U.S.
  - Density: 2,638.8/sq mi (1,018.9/km^{2})
- GDP: $1.295 trillion (2023)

The Los Angeles metropolitan area is defined by the U.S. Office of Management and Budget as the Los Angeles–Long Beach–Anaheim, CA Metropolitan Statistical Area (MSA), with a 2021 population of 12,997,353. The MSA is in turn made up of two "metropolitan divisions":

- Los Angeles–Long Beach–Glendale, CA Metropolitan Division, coterminous with Los Angeles County (2023 population 9,663,345)
- Anaheim–Santa Ana–Irvine, CA Metropolitan Division, coterminous with Orange County (2023 population 3,135,755)

The MSA is the most populous metropolitan area in the Western United States and second-most populous in the United States. It has at its core the Los Angeles–Long Beach–Anaheim urban area, which had a population of 12,237,376 as of the 2020 census.

=== Greater Los Angeles ===
The U.S. Census Bureau also defines a wider commercial region based on commuting patterns, the Los Angeles–Long Beach, CA Combined Statistical Area (CSA), more commonly known as the Greater Los Angeles Area, with an estimated population of 18,316,743 in 2023. The total land area of the CSA is 33,955 sq. mi (87,945 km^{2}).

The CSA includes three component metropolitan areas:

- The Los Angeles–Long Beach–Anaheim, CA MSA (2023 pop. 12,799,100), consisting of:
  - Los Angeles County, California (2023 pop. 9,663,345)
  - Orange County, California (2023 pop. 3,135,755)
- The Oxnard–Thousand Oaks–Ventura, CA MSA, coterminous with Ventura County (2023 pop. 829,590)
- The Riverside–San Bernardino–Ontario, CA MSA (2023 pop. 4,688,053), consisting of:
  - Riverside County, California (2023 pop. 2,492,442)
  - San Bernardino County, California (2023 pop. 2,195,611)

== History ==
Nearly all of the metropolitan area of Greater Los Angeles is located within the homelands of the Tongva, otherwise referred to as Tovaangar.

== Geography ==
=== Urban form ===
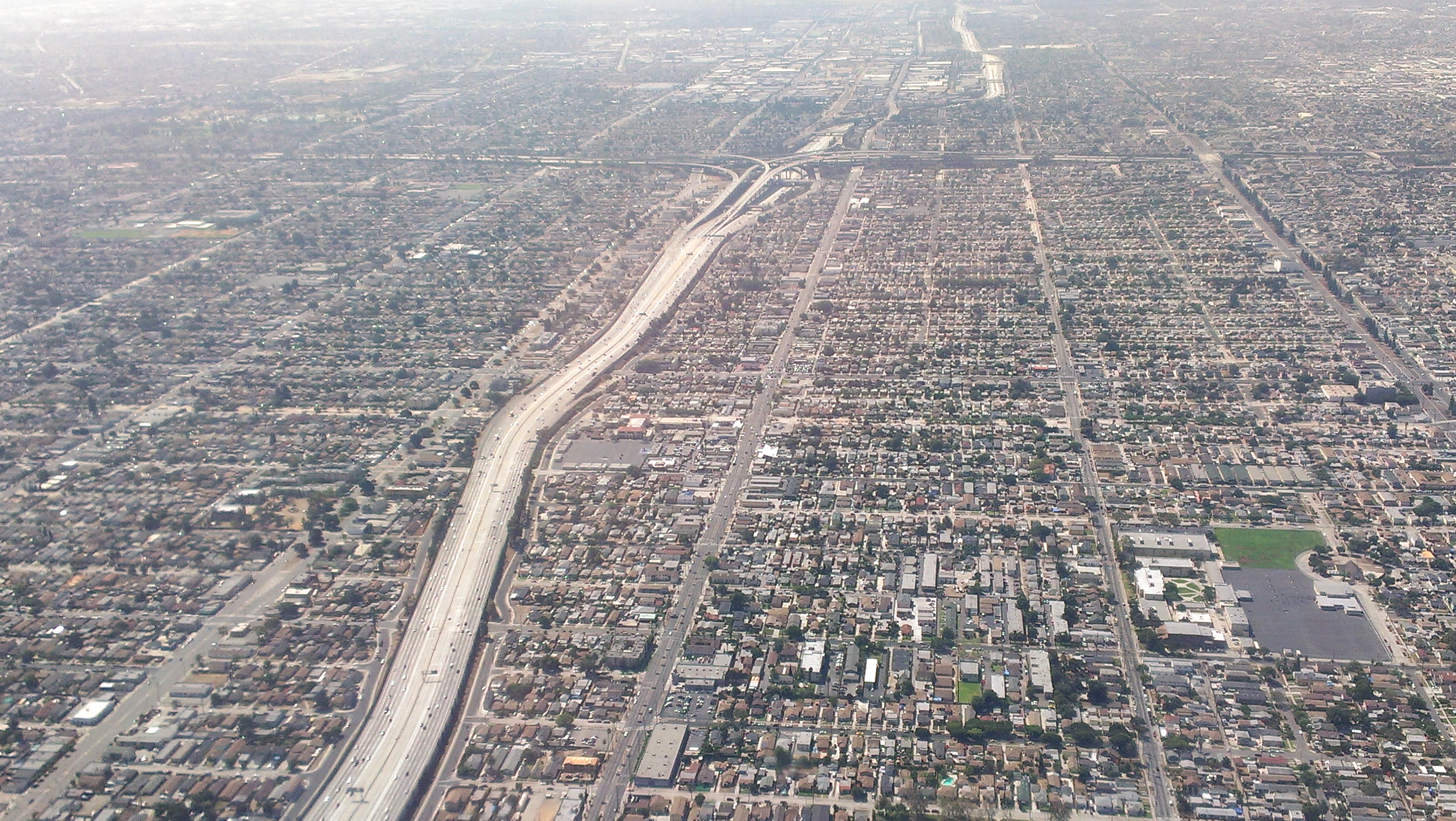
Many areas are completely filled with houses, buildings, roads, and freeways as observed in Vermont Vista, a Los Angeles neighborhood.

Los Angeles has long been famous for its sprawl, but this has to do more with its status in history as the "poster child" of large cities that grew up with suburban-style patterns of development, rather than how it ranks in sprawl among American metro areas today, now that suburban and exurban-style development is present across the country. The Los Angeles–Orange County metro area was the most densely populated "urbanized area" (as defined by the United States Census Bureau) in the United States in 2000, with 7,068 inhabitants per square mile (2,729/km^{2}). For comparison, the "New York–Newark" Urbanized Area had a population density of 5,309 per square mile (2,050/km^{2}).

Los Angeles' reputation for sprawl is due to the fact that the city grew from relative obscurity to one of the country's ten largest cities (i.e. 10th largest city in 1920), at a time when suburban patterns of growth first became possible due to electric streetcars and automobiles. The city was also the first large American city where, in the 1920s, major clusters of regional employment, shopping, and culture were already being built outside the traditional downtown areas – in edge cities such as Mid-Wilshire, Miracle Mile and Hollywood. This pattern of growth continued ever outward, more so when the freeway system was built starting in the 1950s; thus Greater Los Angeles was the earliest large American metropolitan area with a decentralized structure. Its major commercial, financial, and cultural institutions are geographically dispersed rather than being concentrated in a single downtown or central area. Also, the population density of Los Angeles proper is low (approximately 8,300 people per square mile) when compared to some other large American cities such as New York City (27,500), San Francisco (17,000), Boston (13,300), and Chicago (11,800). Densities are particularly high within a 5-mile radius of downtown, where some neighborhoods exceed 20,000 people per square mile. What gives the entire Los Angeles metro region a high density is the fact that many of the city's suburbs and satellite cities have high density rates. Within its urbanized areas, Los Angeles is noted for having small lot sizes and low-rise buildings. Buildings in the area are low when compared to other large cities, mainly due to zoning regulations. Los Angeles became a major city just as the Pacific Electric Railway spread population to smaller cities much as interurbans did in East Coast cities. In the first decades of the twentieth century, the area was marked by a network of fairly dense but separate cities linked by rail. The ascendance of the automobile helped fill in the gaps between these commuter towns with lower-density settlements.

Starting in the early twentieth century, there was a large growth in population on the western edges of the city moving to the San Fernando Valley and out into the Conejo Valley in eastern Ventura County. Many working-class whites migrated to this area during the 1960s and 1970s out of East and Central Los Angeles. As a result, there was a large growth in population into the Conejo Valley and into Ventura County through the US 101 corridor. Making the US 101 a full freeway in the 1960s and expansions that followed helped make commuting to Los Angeles easier and opened the way for development westward. Development in Ventura County and along the US 101 corridor remains controversial, with open-space advocates battling those who feel business development is necessary to economic growth. Although the area still has abundant amounts of open space and land, almost all of it was put aside and mandated never to be developed as part of the master plan of each city. Because of this, the area which was once a relatively inexpensive area to buy real estate saw rising real estate prices well into the 2000s. Median home prices in the Conejo Valley for instance, ranged from $700,000 to $2.2 million in 2003. According to Forbes, "it's nearly impossible" to find reasonably priced real estate in California, and the prices will continue to increase.

The Los Angeles area continues to grow, principally on the periphery where new, cheaper, undeveloped areas are being sought. As such, in these areas, populations as well as housing prices exploded, although the housing bubble popped late in the decade of the 2000s. Riverside and San Bernardino counties, which contain large swaths of desert, attracted most of the population increase between 2000 and 2006. Growth continues not only outside the existing urbanized area but also adjacent to existing development in the central areas. As in virtually all US core cities, there is now vigorous residential development in the downtown area with both new buildings and renovation of former office buildings. The Los Angeles Downtown News keeps a list of ongoing development projects, updated every quarter. Over the course of the 21st century, droughts and wildfires have increased in frequency and the region's water security has become a development issue.

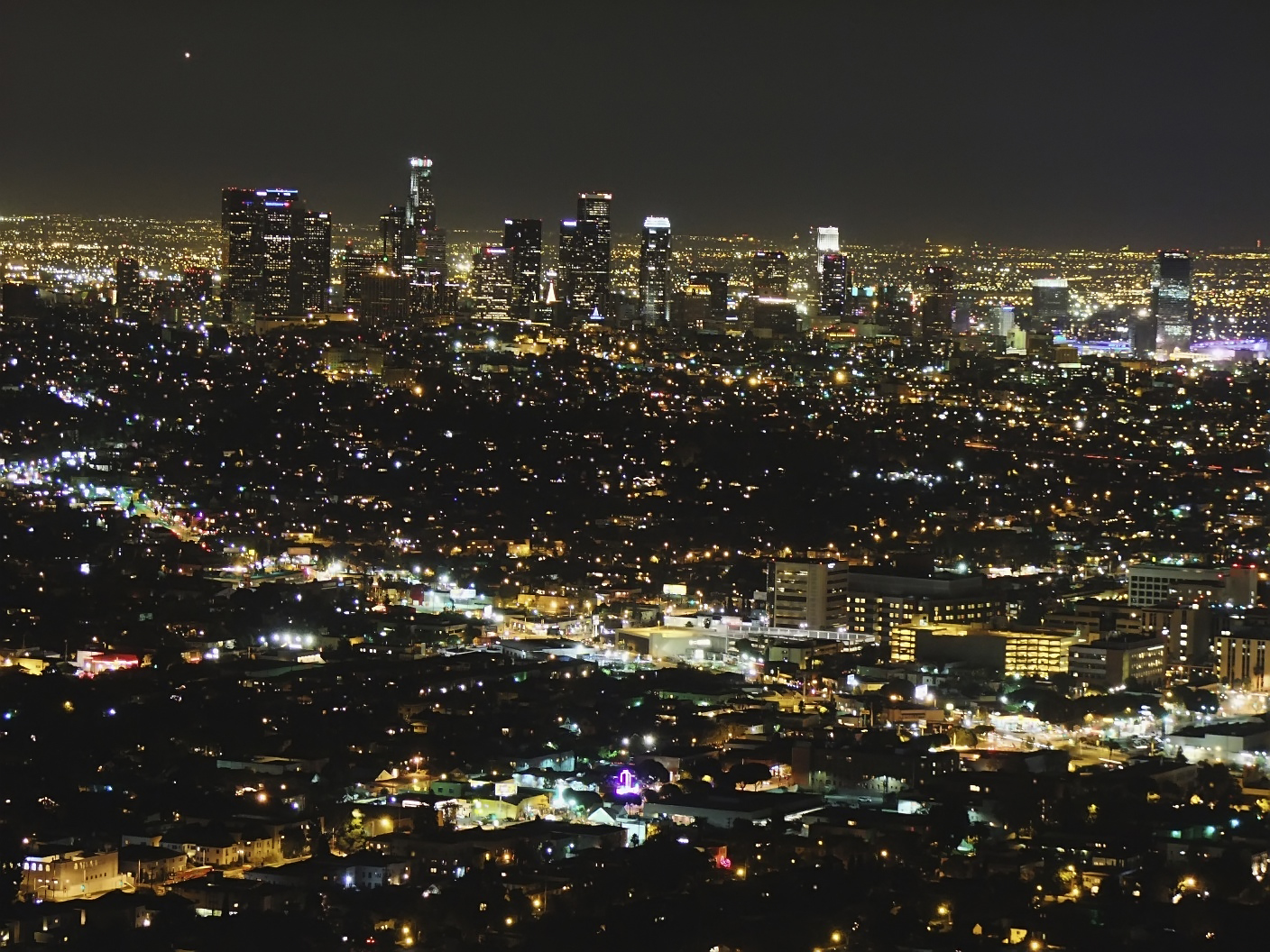
Downtown Los Angeles

=== Major business districts and edge cities ===
The traditional business district and historical downtown of Greater Los Angeles is Downtown Los Angeles. However, most commercial activity is found outside downtown Los Angeles in the edge cities of Century City, Wilshire Boulevard in Koreatown, Hollywood, the Sunset Strip in West Hollywood, Universal City, the Warner Center in Woodland Hills, and Sherman Oaks and Encino, notable for existing alongside extensive suburban development.

In fact, the Los Angeles area is considered a classic example of a metropolitan area that developed in such fashion.

Furthermore, since the COVID-19 pandemic Downtown Los Angeles has experienced staggering commercial vacancy rates, urban blight, homelessness, drug use, and crime. Entire skyscrapers were reportedly sold for less than large estates in Bel Air.

Within the broader county of Los Angeles and metro area, areas such as Downtown Long Beach, downtown Pasadena, downtown Glendale, and downtown Burbank, Downtown Santa Ana, Downtown Anaheim, Downtown Riverside, Downtown San Bernardino, downtown Irvine, and downtown Ontario are notable.

=== Identity ===
Employment is not only in the downtown area, but consistently occurs outside the central core. As such, many people commute throughout the city and suburbs in various directions for their work and daily activities, with a large portion heading to the municipalities that are outside the city of Los Angeles.

Unlike most metropolitan areas, regional identity remains a contentious issue in the Greater Los Angeles area, with many residents not acknowledging any association with the region as a whole. For example, while Los Angeles County and Orange County together make up the smaller MSA region, the two host many sub-areas that each have sharp demographic, political, and financial distinctions. South Orange County residents often attempt to be identified apart from Los Angeles although they make up the same metropolitan area. Also, while only 1.63% of Los Angeles residents commute to Orange County for work, over 6% of Orange County commuters head to Los Angeles for work. Western Riverside County and San Bernardino County have become commuter regions characteristic of other suburban counties throughout the nation. Residents in these counties often commute to Los Angeles County and Orange County for employment.

== Component counties, subregions, and cities ==
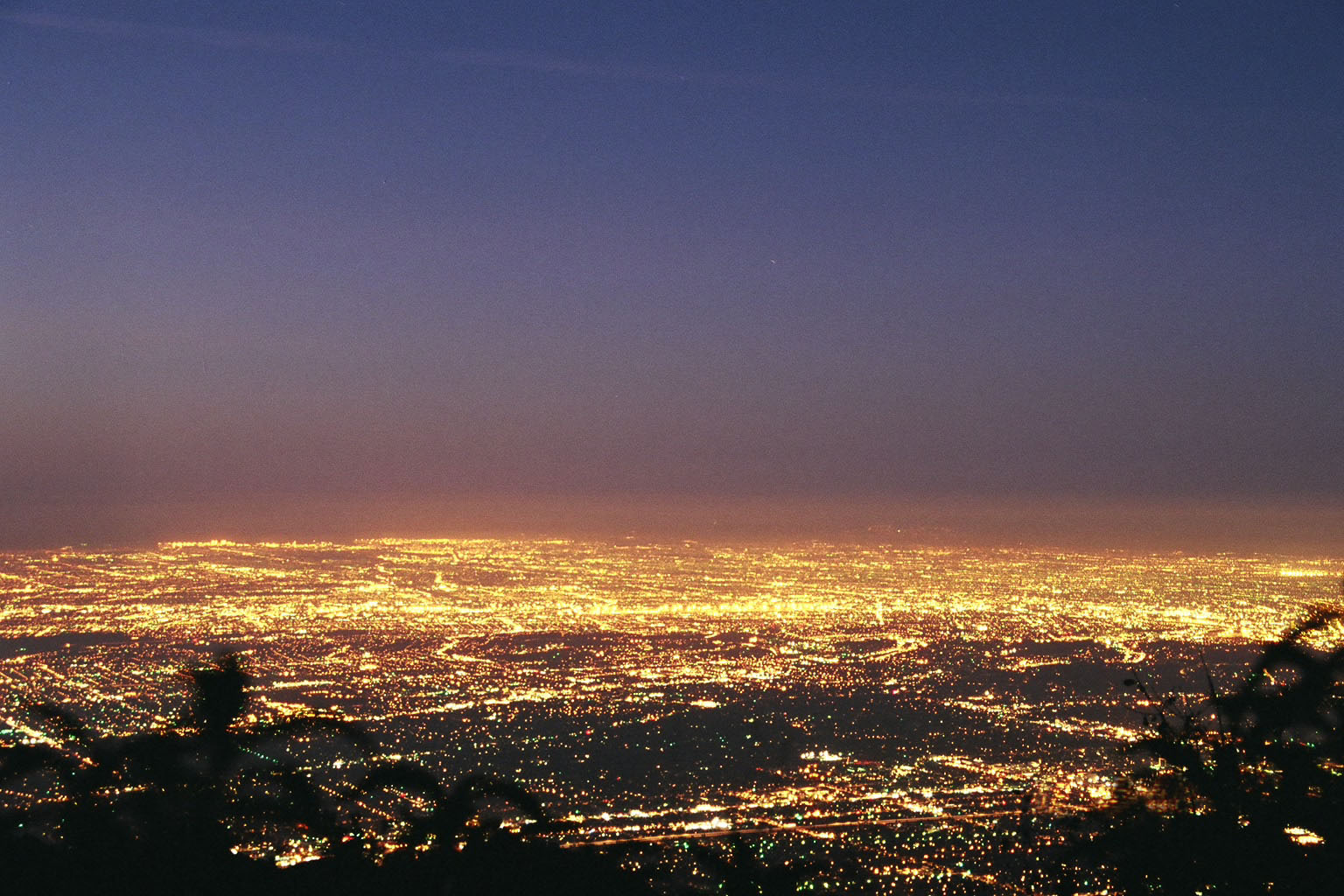
Los Angeles Basin at dawn

=== Los Angeles County ===
Los Angeles County, of which the City of Los Angeles is the county seat, is the most populous county in the United States and is home to over a quarter of all California residents. The large size of the city of Los Angeles, as well as its history of annexing smaller towns, has made city boundaries in the central area of Los Angeles County quite complicated. Many cities are completely surrounded by the city of Los Angeles and are often included in the city's areas despite being independent municipalities. For example, Santa Monica and Beverly Hills (which is almost completely surrounded by Los Angeles) are considered part of the Westside, while Hawthorne and Inglewood are associated with South L.A. Adjacent areas that are outside the actual city boundaries of incorporated Los Angeles but border the city itself include the Santa Clarita Valley, the San Gabriel Valley, South Bay, and the Gateway Cities.

Despite the large footprint of the city of Los Angeles, a majority of the land area within Los Angeles County is unincorporated and under the primary jurisdiction of Los Angeles County. Much of this land, however, cannot be easily developed due to planning challenges presented by geographic features such as the Santa Monica Mountains, the San Gabriel Mountains, and the Mojave Desert. Actual land development in these regions occurs on the fringes of incorporated cities, some of which have been fully developed, such as the cities of Palmdale and Lancaster.

==== Subregions in Los Angeles County ====
While there is not an official designation for the regions that comprise Greater Los Angeles, one authority, the Los Angeles Times, divides the area into the following regions:

- Angeles Forest
- Antelope Valley
- Central L.A. (Downtown Los Angeles, Hollywood, Mid-Wilshire, etc.)
- Eastside
- Gateway Cities/Harbor Area
- Northeast L.A. (Highland Park, Eagle Rock, etc.)
- Northwest L.A. County (including the Santa Clarita Valley)
- Pomona Valley (partially in San Bernardino County)
- San Fernando Valley
- San Gabriel Valley
- Santa Clarita Valley
- Santa Monica Mountains (Malibu, Topanga, etc.)
- South Bay (incl. Palos Verdes Peninsula, Beach Cities)
- South Los Angeles
- Southeast Los Angeles County (including Norwalk and Whittier, see Gateway Cities)
- The Verdugos (including Glendale, Pasadena and the Crescenta Valley)
- Westside

Some of the above areas can be defined as being bounded by natural features such as mountains or the ocean; others are marked by city boundaries, freeways, or other constructed landmarks. For example, Downtown Los Angeles is the area of Los Angeles roughly enclosed by three freeways and one river: the Harbor Freeway (SR 110) to the west, the Santa Ana Freeway (US 101) to the north, the Los Angeles River to the east, and the Santa Monica Freeway (I-10) to the south. Meanwhile, the San Fernando Valley ("The Valley") is defined as the basin consisting of the part of Los Angeles and its suburbs that lie north-northwest of downtown and is ringed by mountains.

==== Edge cities in Los Angeles County ====
===== Central and Western area =====
- Beverly Hills/Century City
- LAX/El Segundo
- Marina Del Rey/Culver City
- West Los Angeles
- Mid-Wilshire
- Miracle Mile

===== San Fernando Valley =====
- Burbank/North Hollywood
- Sherman Oaks/Van Nuys, Los Angeles
- Warner Center/West Valley

===== Elsewhere in Los Angeles County =====
- Pasadena
- South Bay/Torrance/Carson
- South Valley/Covina (emerging edge city as of 1991)
- Santa Clarita (emerging edge city as of 1991)

==== Cities in Los Angeles County ====
With a population of nearly 4.1 million people at the 2020 census, the City of Los Angeles is the second most populous city in the United States after New York City, and is the focal point of the Greater Los Angeles Area. As an international center for finance, entertainment, media, culture, education, tourism, and science, Los Angeles is considered one of the world's most powerful and influential global cities.

List of the 88 cities of Los Angeles County and six large CDPs by population at the 2020 U.S. census:

- Los Angeles (3,898,747)
- Long Beach (466,742)
- Santa Clarita (228,673)
- Glendale (196,543)
- Lancaster (173,516)
- Palmdale (169,450)
- Pomona (151,713)
- Torrance (147,067)
- Pasadena (138,699)
- East Los Angeles CDP (118,786)
- Downey (114,355)
- West Covina (109,501)
- El Monte (109,450)
- Inglewood (107,762)
- Burbank (107,337)
- Norwalk (102,773)
- Compton (95,740)
- Carson (95,558)
- Santa Monica (93,076)
- South Gate (92,726)
- Hawthorne (88,083)
- Whittier (87,306)
- Alhambra (82,868)
- Lakewood (82,496)
- Bellflower (79,190)
- Baldwin Park (72,176)
- Redondo Beach (71,576)
- Lynwood (67,265)
- Montebello (62,640)
- Pico Rivera (62,088)
- Florence-Graham CDP (61,983)
- Monterey Park (61,096)
- Gardena (61,027)
- Arcadia (56,681)
- South Whittier CDP (56,415)
- Diamond Bar (55,072)
- Huntington Park (54,883)
- Hacienda Heights CDP (54,191)
- Paramount (53,733)
- Glendora (52,558)
- Covina (51,268)
- Rosemead (51,185)
- Azusa (50,000)
- Cerritos (49,578)
- Rowland Heights CDP (48,231)
- La Mirada (48,008)
- Altadena CDP (42,846)
- Rancho Palos Verdes (42,287)
- Culver City (40,779)
- San Gabriel (39,568)
- Bell Gardens (39,501)
- La Puente (38,062)
- Monrovia (37,931)
- Claremont (37,266)
- Temple City (36,494)
- West Hollywood (35,757)
- Manhattan Beach (35,506)
- San Dimas (34,924)
- Bell (33,559)
- Beverly Hills (32,701)
- Lawndale (31,807)
- La Verne (31,334)
- Walnut (28,430)
- South Pasadena (26,943)
- Maywood (25,138)
- San Fernando (23,946)
- Calabasas (23,241)
- Cudahy (22,811)
- Duarte (21,727)
- Lomita (20,921)
- La Cañada Flintridge (20,573)
- Agoura Hills (20,299)
- Hermosa Beach (19,728)
- South El Monte (19,567)
- Santa Fe Springs (19,219)
- El Segundo (17,272)
- Artesia (16,395)
- Hawaiian Gardens (14,149)
- Palos Verdes Estates (13,347)
- San Marino (12,513)
- Commerce (12,378)
- Signal Hill (11,848)
- Sierra Madre (11,268)
- Malibu (10,654)
- Rolling Hills Estates (8,280)
- Westlake Village (8,029)
- La Habra Heights (5,682)
- Avalon (3,460)
- Rolling Hills (1,739)
- Hidden Hills (1,725)
- Irwindale (1,472)
- Bradbury (921)
- Industry (264)
- Vernon (222)

=== Orange County ===
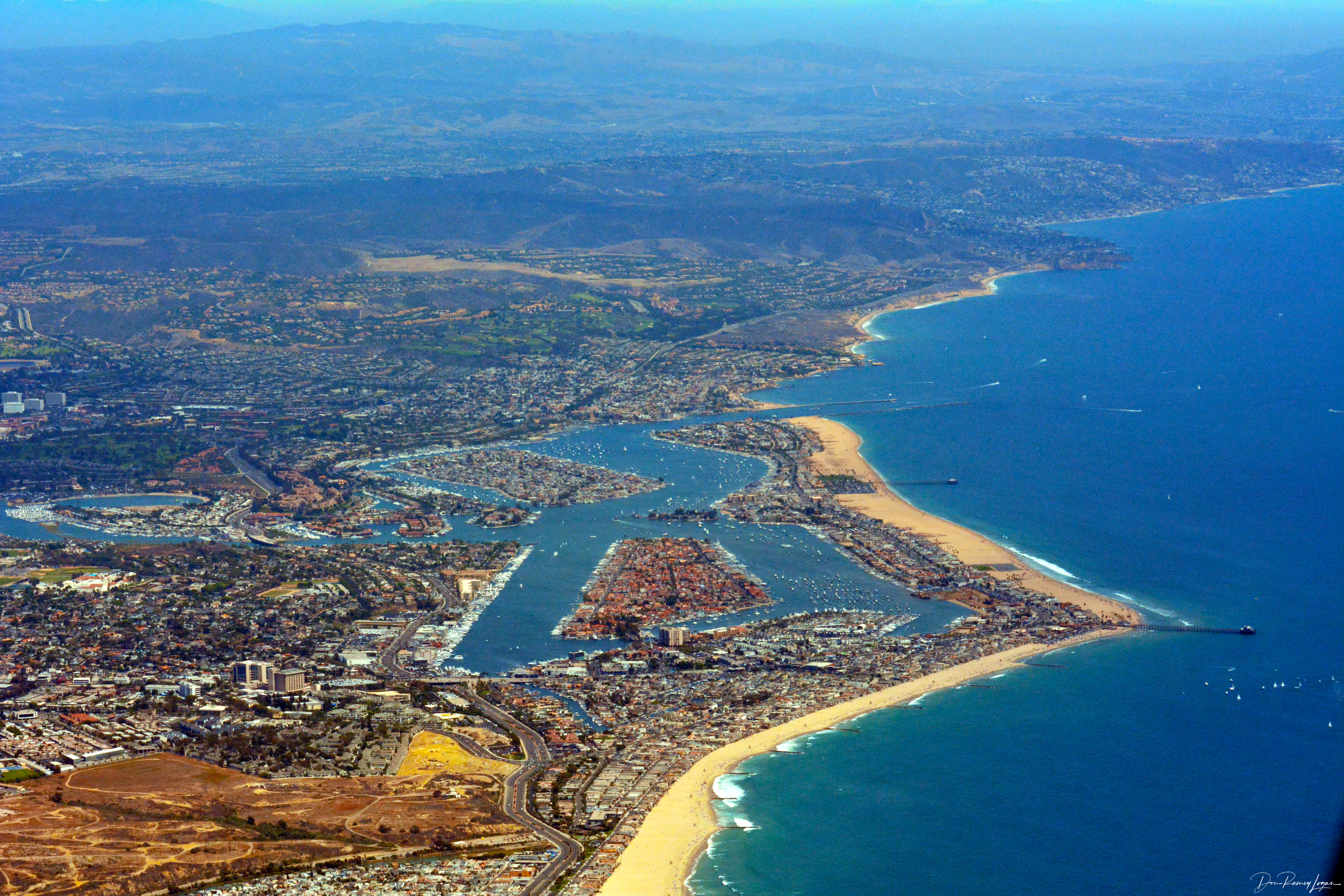
Aerial view of Newport Beach in Orange County

Orange County was originally an agricultural area dependent on citrus crops, avocados, and oil extraction, and became a bedroom community for Los Angeles when I–5, the Santa Ana Freeway, linked it to the city in the 1950s. The growth of Los Angeles initially fueled population growth in Orange County, but by the 1970s it had become an important economic center in its own right, with tourism and electronics industries, among others. Today, Orange County is known for its tourist attractions, such as Disneyland Resort, Knott's Berry Farm, its several pristine beaches and coastline, and its wealthier areas, featured in television shows such as The O.C. None of the original downtowns serves as the central urban core for the county, but there are important clusters of business and culture in Downtown Santa Ana and in three edge cities: the Anaheim–Santa Ana edge city from Disneyland Resort to the Orange Crush interchange (Orange, Santa Ana), the South Coast Plaza–John Wayne Airport edge city (Santa Ana, Costa Mesa, Irvine), and Irvine's Spectrum edge city.

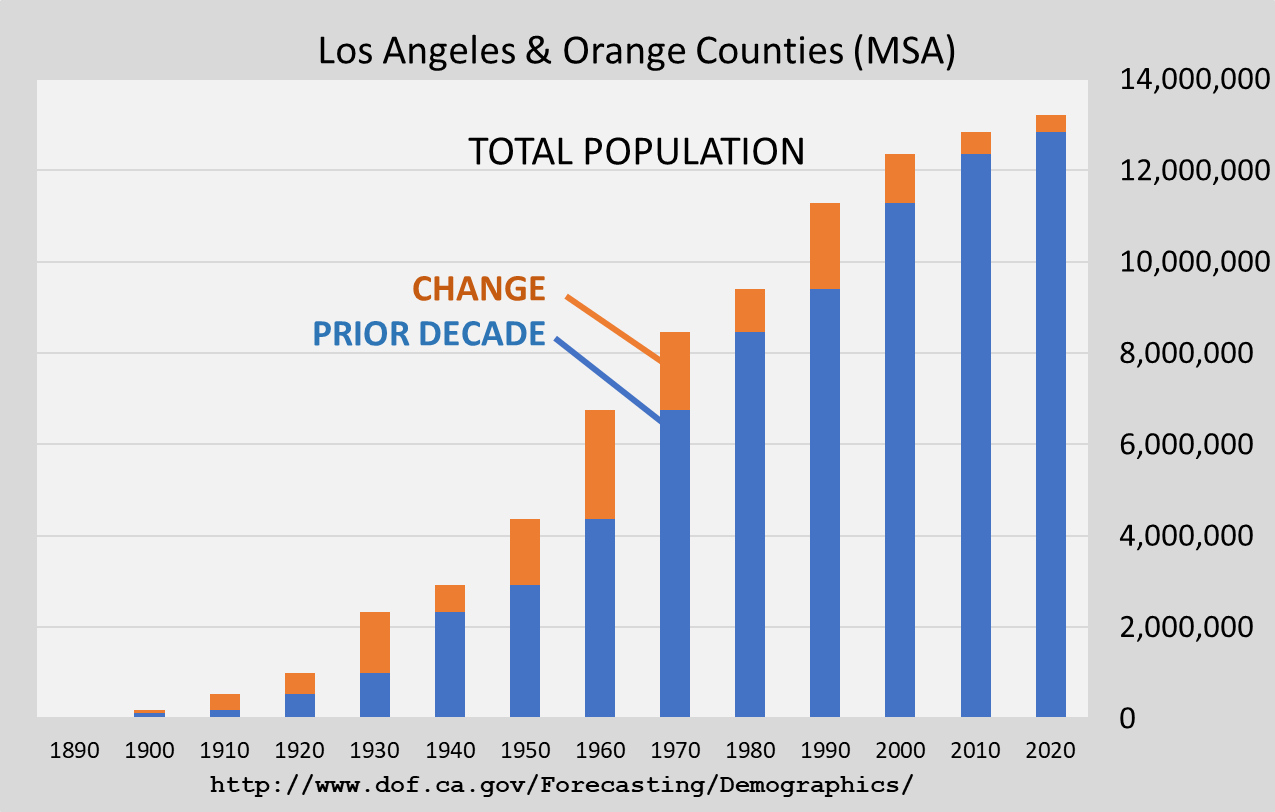
Population of Los Angeles and Orange Counties since 1890

Orange County is sometimes figuratively divided into "North County" and "South County", with North Orange County including cities such as Anaheim, Fullerton, and Santa Ana, and is the older, more ethnically diverse and more densely built-up area both geographically and culturally closer to Los Angeles. South County, defined variously as beginning with either Costa Mesa or Irvine and includes cities to the east and south such as Laguna Beach, Mission Viejo, Newport Beach, and San Clemente, is more residential, affluent, recently developed, and has a mostly white population. Irvine is an exception, as it is a center of employment and is ethnically diverse. A growing alternative dividing marker between north and south is the El Toro Y interchange. Orange Coast or South Coast area is defined instead as consisting of some or all of the cities lining the coast.

==== Subregions in Orange County ====
- North Orange County
- South Orange County

==== Edge cities in Orange County ====
- Anaheim–Santa Ana edge city
- Fullerton/La Habra/Brea (emerging edge city as of 1991)
- Irvine Spectrum
- Newport Center/Fashion Island (emerging edge city as of 1991)
- San Clemente/Laguna Niguel (emerging edge city as of 1991)
- South Coast Plaza–John Wayne Airport edge city
- Westminster/Huntington Beach

==== Cities in Orange County ====
List of the 34 cities in Orange County by population at the 2020 census:

- Anaheim (346,824)
- Santa Ana (310,227)
- Irvine (307,670)
- Huntington Beach (198,711)
- Garden Grove (171,949)
- Fullerton (143,617)
- Orange (139,911)
- Costa Mesa (111,918)
- Mission Viejo (93,653)
- Westminster (90,911)
- Lake Forest (85,858)
- Newport Beach (85,239)
- Buena Park (84,034)
- Tustin (80,276)
- Yorba Linda (68,336)
- Laguna Niguel (64,355)
- San Clemente (64,293)
- La Habra (63,097)
- Fountain Valley (57,047)
- Aliso Viejo (52,176)
- Placentia (51,824)
- Cypress (50,151)
- Rancho Santa Margarita (47,949)
- Brea (47,325)
- Stanton (37,962)
- San Juan Capistrano (35,196)
- Dana Point (33,107)
- Laguna Hills (31,374)
- Seal Beach (25,242)
- Laguna Beach (23,032)
- Laguna Woods (17,644)
- La Palma (15,581)
- Los Alamitos (11,780)
- Villa Park (5,843)

=== Inland Empire ===
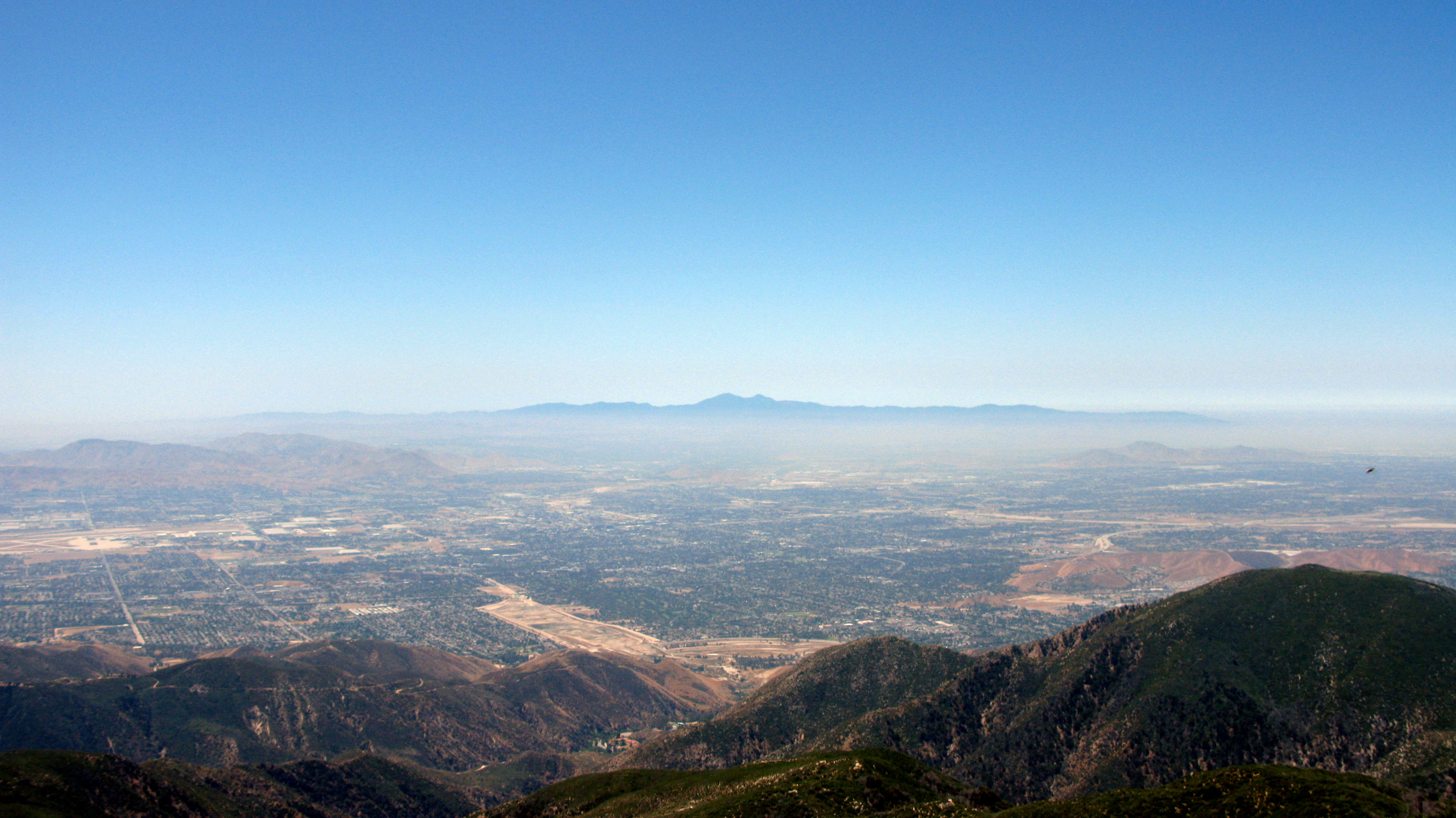
San Bernardino Valley

The Inland Empire, consisting of San Bernardino and Riverside Counties, contains fast-growing suburbs of the region, with a large to majority percentage of the working population commuting to either Los Angeles or Orange counties for work. Originally an important center for citrus production, the region became an important industrial area by the early 20th century. The Inland Empire also became a key transportation center following the completion of Route 66, and later I-10. With the post-World War II economic boom leading to rapid development in Los Angeles and Orange Counties, land developers bulldozed acres of agricultural land to build suburbs in order to accommodate the Los Angeles area's expanding population. The development of a regional freeway system facilitated the expansion of suburbs and human migration linking the Inland Empire and rest of Greater Los Angeles. Despite being primarily suburban, the Inland Empire is also home to important warehousing, shipping, logistics and retail industries, centered on the subregion's major cities of Riverside, San Bernardino and Ontario.

While the Inland Empire is sometimes defined as the entirety of San Bernardino and Riverside counties, the eastern undeveloped, desert portions of these counties are not considered to be part of Greater Los Angeles. The state of California defines this area to include the cities of Adelanto, Apple Valley, and Victorville to the north, the Riverside–San Diego county line to the south, and the towns of Anza, Idyllwild, and Lucerne Valley, along with the San Bernardino National Forest to the east.

Additionally, the southwest portion of Riverside County, centered on the city of Temecula is more economically linked to San Diego county, with its growth largely being driven by migrants from San Diego seeking more affordable housing similar to how northwestern Riverside county's growth was driven by migrants from Orange County and Los Angeles seeking more affordable housing.

However, with clear northern and southern limits to expansion, the region's urban eastern boundaries have become increasingly nebulous as suburban sprawl continues to spread out to form a unified whole with Los Angeles, with further development encroaching past the San Bernardino and San Jacinto Mountains and into the outlying desert areas. As a result, the regional definition of Greater Los Angeles can now be extended to include Barstow and surrounding towns in the northeast, the Morongo Basin in the east-central including Yucca Valley and Twentynine Palms, and the Coachella Valley cities in the southeast. This interconnectivity, provided by one of the most extensive freeway systems in the world, as well as economic, social and media ties, has blended boundaries between these regions and the urbanized Los Angeles and Inland Empire areas.

==== Subregions in the Inland Empire ====
- High Desert (includes Antelope Valley in Los Angeles County plus Victor Valley and Morongo Basin)
- Low Desert (Coachella Valley, Palm Springs and Palm Desert area)
- San Bernardino Mountains (Lake Arrowhead and Big Bear Lake area)
- Northwest Riverside County (Corona, Norco, Jurupa Valley, and Riverside area)
- Moreno Valley (Moreno Valley and Perris)
- Pomona Valley (Pomona, Rancho Cucamonga, Chino, Eastvale, Upland, Claremont, Montclair, La Verne and Ontario area. Partially in Los Angeles County)
- San Bernardino Valley (San Bernardino, Fontana, Rialto, Colton, Loma Linda, Highland, and Redlands area)
- San Gorgonio Pass (Banning, Yucaipa, Calimesa, and Beaumont area)
- San Jacinto Valley (Hemet and San Jacinto area)
- Temecula Valley (Lake Elsinore, Menifee, Murrieta, Wildomar, and Temecula area)

==== Edge cities in the Inland Empire ====
- Ontario Airport/Rancho Cucamonga
- Riverside (emerging edge city as of 1991)
- San Bernardino (emerging edge city as of 1991)

==== Cities in Riverside County ====
List of the 28 cities of Riverside County by population at the 2020 U.S. census:

- Riverside (314,998)
- Moreno Valley (208,634)
- Corona (157,136)
- Murrieta (110,949)
- Temecula (110,003)
- Jurupa Valley (105,053)
- Menifee (102,527)
- Hemet (89,833)
- Indio (89,137)
- Perris (78,700)
- Lake Elsinore (70,265)
- Eastvale (69,757)
- San Jacinto (53,898)
- Beaumont (53,036)
- Cathedral City (51,493)
- Palm Desert (51,163)
- Palm Springs (44,575)
- Coachella (41,941)
- La Quinta (37,558)
- Wildomar (36,875)
- Desert Hot Springs (32,512)
- Banning (29,505)
- Norco (26,316)
- Blythe (18,317)
- Rancho Mirage (16,999)
- Canyon Lake (11,082)
- Calimesa (10,026)
- Indian Wells (4,757)

==== Cities and towns in San Bernardino County ====
List of the 24 cities and incorporated towns of San Bernardino County by population at the 2020 U.S. census:

- San Bernardino (222,101)
- Fontana (208,393)
- Ontario (175,265)
- Rancho Cucamonga (174,453)
- Victorville (134,810)
- Rialto (104,026)
- Hesperia (99,818)
- Chino (91,403)
- Upland (79,040)
- Chino Hills (78,411)
- Redlands (73,168)
- Apple Valley (75,791)
- Highland (56,999)
- Yucaipa (54,542)
- Colton (53,909)
- Adelanto (38,046)
- Montclair (37,865)
- Twentynine Palms (28,065)
- Barstow (25,415)
- Loma Linda (24,791)
- Yucca Valley (21,738)
- Grand Terrace (13,150)
- Big Bear Lake (5,046)
- Needles (4,931)

==== Sparsely populated areas in the Inland Empire ====
While the above areas are included in the regional definition of Greater Los Angeles, the U.S. Census Bureau defines Greater Los Angeles, or officially, the Los Angeles–Long Beach Combined Statistical Area, to include both the above-mentioned areas along with the entirety of San Bernardino and Riverside counties. These areas are sparsely developed and are part of the Mojave and Colorado Deserts. To the north, I-15 crosses desolate desert landscape after passing Barstow, linking Greater Los Angeles with Las Vegas, with Baker being the only significant outpost along the route. To the east, lie the Mojave National Preserve and Joshua Tree National Park along with the towns of Needles and Blythe on the California-Arizona state line.

=== Ventura County ===
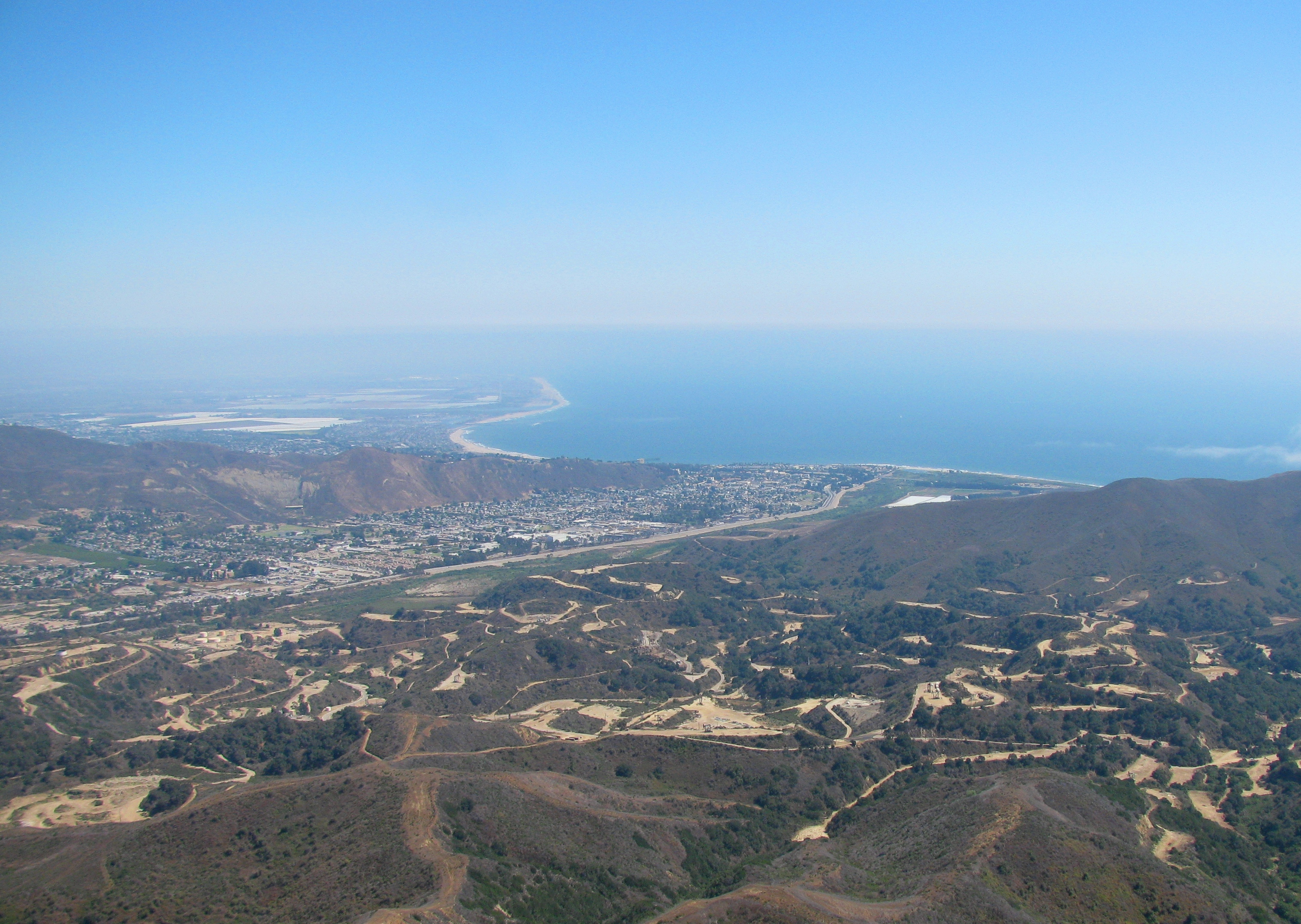
The Ventura coast

Ventura County is mostly suburban and rural and also has developed primarily through the growth of Los Angeles. Central and southern Ventura County formerly consisted of small towns along the Pacific Coast until the expansion of US 101 drew in commuters from the San Fernando Valley. Master-planned cities soon began developing, and the county became increasingly urbanized. The northern part of the county, however, remains largely undeveloped and is mostly within the Los Padres National Forest.

==== Subregions in Ventura County ====
- Conejo Valley
- Oxnard Plain

==== Edge cities in Ventura County ====
- Ventura/Coastal Plain (emerging edge city as of 1991)

==== Cities in Ventura County ====
List of the 10 cities of Ventura County by population at the 2020 U.S. census:

- Oxnard (202,063)
- Thousand Oaks (126,966)
- Simi Valley (126,356)
- Ventura (110,763)
- Camarillo (70,741)
- Moorpark (36,284)
- Santa Paula (30,657)
- Port Hueneme (21,954)
- Fillmore (16,419)
- Ojai (7,637)

=== Urban areas within ===
Urban areas within the Los Angeles combined statistical area as of the 2020 census. (Far eastern portions of Riverside and San Bernardino counties are cropped out). Urban areas Counties in the Los Angeles MSA Counties in the Los Angeles CSA but not the MSA

At the core of the Los Angeles–Long Beach combined statistical area (CSA) lies the Los Angeles–Long Beach–Anaheim, CA urban area, the second most populous in the United States. Within the boundaries of the CSA the Census Bureau defines 30 other urban areas as well, two of which (Riverside–San Bernardino and Oxnard–Ventura) form the core of their own metropolitan areas separate from the Los Angeles metropolitan statistical area. Urban areas situated primarily outside the Los Angeles metropolitan statistical area but within the CSA are identified with a cross (†) in the table below.

Urban area	Population (2020 census)	Land area (sq mi)	Land area (km^{2})	Density (population / sq mi)	Density (population / km^{2})
Los Angeles–Long Beach–Anaheim, CA	13,200,897	1,636.83	4,239.36	7,476.28	2,886.61
Riverside–San Bernardino, CA †	2,276,703	608.56	1,576.17	3,741.10	1,444.45
Mission Viejo–Lake Forest–Laguna Niguel, CA	646,843	163.63	423.81	3,953.02	1,526.27
Temecula–Murrieta–Menifee, CA †	528,991	150.47	389.73	3,515.49	1,357.34
Oxnard–San Buenaventura (Ventura), CA †	376,117	76.61	198.41	4,909.70	1,895.65
Indio–Palm Desert–Palm Springs, CA †	361,075	151.82	393.22	2,378.26	918.25
Palmdale–Lancaster, CA	359,559	84.78	219.59	4,240.90	1,637.42
Victorville–Hesperia–Apple Valley, CA †	355,816	131.77	341.29	2,700.19	1,042.55
Santa Clarita, CA	278,031	77.85	201.62	3,571.56	1,378.99
Thousand Oaks, CA †	213,986	80.20	207.71	2,668.26	1,030.22
Hemet, CA †	173,194	37.06	95.98	4,673.61	1,804.49
Simi Valley, CA †	127,364	31.63	81.91	4,027.01	1,554.84
Camarillo, CA †	76,338	22.48	58.22	3,395.98	1,311.19
Desert Hot Springs, CA †	45,767	14.08	36.47	3,250.66	1,255.09
Santa Paula, CA †	30,675	4.96	12.86	6,179.04	2,385.74
Barstow, CA †	30,522	12.38	32.07	2,465.05	951.76
Crestline–Lake Arrowhead, CA †	22,272	16.85	43.64	1,321.70	510.31
Yucca Valley, CA †	18,293	11.33	29.36	1,613.95	623.15
Big Bear, CA †	16,498	15.93	41.26	1,035.73	399.90
Fillmore, CA †	16,397	2.63	6.82	6,227.80	2,404.57
Twentynine Palms, CA †	12,881	6.82	17.66	1,889.13	729.40
Blythe, CA–AZ †	11,780	6.20	16.06	1,899.83	733.53
Twentynine Palms North, CA †	11,665	2.77	7.18	4,206.03	1,623.96
Fort Irwin, CA †	8,096	3.62	9.37	2,238.42	864.26
Mecca, CA †	6,875	0.63	1.62	10,979.30	4,239.13
Needles, CA–AZ †	6,739	5.55	14.38	1,213.99	468.73
Silver Lakes, CA †	5,908	2.12	5.49	2,789.52	1,077.04
Running Springs, CA †	5,313	3.64	9.44	1,458.40	563.09
Joshua Tree, CA †	4,370	3.80	9.85	1,149.11	443.67
Wrightwood, CA †	3,927	1.38	3.59	2,835.51	1,094.80
Avalon, CA	3,362	1.19	3.08	2,826.47	1,091.31

== Demographics ==
Historical population Greater Los Angeles CSA (Five-county area)
Census	Pop.	Note	%±
1900	250,187		—
1910	648,316		159.1%
1920	1,150,252		77.4%
1930	2,597,066		125.8%
1940	3,252,720		25.2%
1950	4,934,246		51.7%
1960	7,751,616		57.1%
1970	9,981,942		28.8%
1980	11,497,486		15.2%
1990	14,531,529		26.4%
2000	16,373,645		12.7%
2010	17,877,006		9.2%
2020	18,644,680		4.3%
2023 (est.)	18,316,743		−1.8%
U.S. Census Bureau

According to the 2020 census, there were 18,644,680 people living in the Greater Los Angeles Area. The racial makeup of the area was 29.4% White (23.0% Non-Hispanic European and 6.4% Non-Hispanic Middle Eastern), 13.8% Asian (Non-Hispanic), 0.2% Pacific Islander (Non-Hispanic), 6.1% African American (Non-Hispanic), 0.2% Native American (Non-Hispanic), 0.5% from other races (Non-Hispanic), and 3.3% from two or more races (Non-Hispanic). 46.3% of the population were Hispanic of any race, a super-majority of which was of Mexican origin. 29.4% of the population (5.5 million) was foreign born; most immigrants came from Latin America and Asia.

The explosive growth of the region in the 20th century can be attributed to its favorable Mediterranean climate, the availability of land and many booming industries such as oil, automobile and rubber, motion pictures, intermodal, logistics, and aerospace which in turn attracted millions of people from all over the United States and world. Citrus production was important to the region's development in the earlier part of the 20th century.

Population density in the Los Angeles urban area

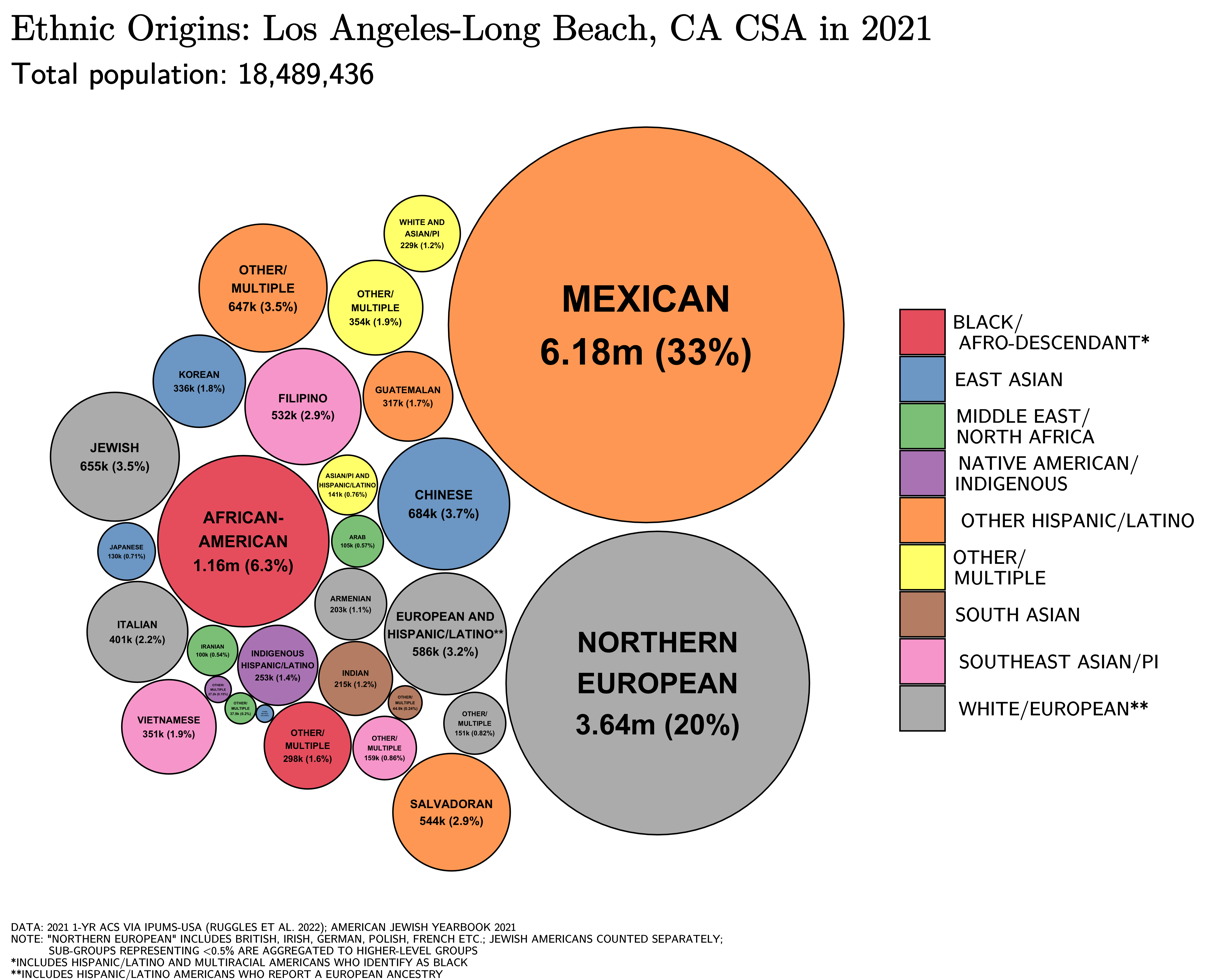
Ethnic origins in LA CSA (5 counties)

While the New York metropolitan area is presently the most populous metropolitan area in the United States, it has been predicted in the past that Greater Los Angeles will eventually surpass Greater New York in population. Whether this will happen is yet to be seen, but past predictions on this event have been off the mark. A 1966 article in Time predicted Greater Los Angeles would surpass New York by 1975, and that by 1990, would reach close to the 19 million mark. But the article's flawed definition of Greater Los Angeles included San Diego, which is actually its own metropolitan area. A 1989 article in The New York Times predicted Greater Los Angeles would surpass Greater New York by 2010, but the article predicted the population would be 18.3 million in that year, a number Greater New York already surpassed in 2007 by half a million people. By 2009, the New York metropolitan area had a population of 22.2 million compared to the Greater Los Angeles Area's 18.7 million, about a 3.56 million persons difference. Percentage growth, however, has been higher in Greater Los Angeles over the past few decades than in Greater New York.

=== Demographics of Los Angeles and Orange counties ===
County	2025 Estimate	2020 Census	Change	Area	Density
Los Angeles County	9,694,934	10,014,009	−3.19%	4,057.88 sq mi (10,509.9 km^{2})	2,389/sq mi (922/km^{2})
Orange County	3,149,507	3,186,989	−1.18%	790.57 sq mi (2,047.6 km^{2})	3,984/sq mi (1,538/km^{2})
Total	12,844,441	13,200,998	−2.70%	4,848.45 sq mi (12,557.4 km^{2})	2,649/sq mi (1,023/km^{2})

Historical population Los Angeles MSA (Los Angeles and Orange Counties)
Census	Pop.	Note	%±
1890	115,043		—
1900	189,994		65.2%
1910	538,567		183.5%
1920	997,830		85.3%
1930	2,327,166		133.2%
1940	2,916,403		25.3%
1950	4,367,911		49.8%
1960	6,742,696		54.4%
1970	8,462,366		25.5%
1980	9,410,130		11.2%
1990	11,273,720		19.8%
2000	12,365,627		9.7%
2010	12,828,837		3.7%
2020	13,200,998		2.9%
2023 (est.)	12,799,100		−3.0%
State Census data

==== Age and gender ====
According to the 2009 American Community Survey, the Los Angeles Metropolitan Area had a population of 12,874,797, of which 6,402,498 (49.7% of the population) were male and 6,472,299 (50.3% of the population) were female. The age composition is shown in the table at right.

Age distribution Los Angeles and Orange Counties, 2009
Age	% of pop.
Under 5	7.3%
5 to 9	6.6%
10 to 14	7.0%
15 to 19	7.2%
20 to 24	7.0%
25 to 34	15.5%
35 to 44	14.8%
45 to 54	13.9%
55 to 59	5.5%
60 to 64	4.4%
65 to 74	5.6%
75 to 84	3.6%
85 and over	1.6%
Median age	34.6

Median age: 34.6 years

==== Race ====
According to the 2020 census, there were 18,644,680 people living in the Greater Los Angeles Area. The racial makeup of the area was 29.4% White (23.0% Non-Hispanic European and 6.4% Non-Hispanic Middle Eastern), 13.8% Asian (Non-Hispanic), 0.2% Pacific Islander (Non-Hispanic), 6.1% African American (Non-Hispanic), 0.2% Native American (Non-Hispanic), 0.5% from other races (Non-Hispanic), and 3.3% from two or more races (Non-Hispanic). 46.3% of the population were Hispanic of any race, a super-majority of which was of Mexican origin.

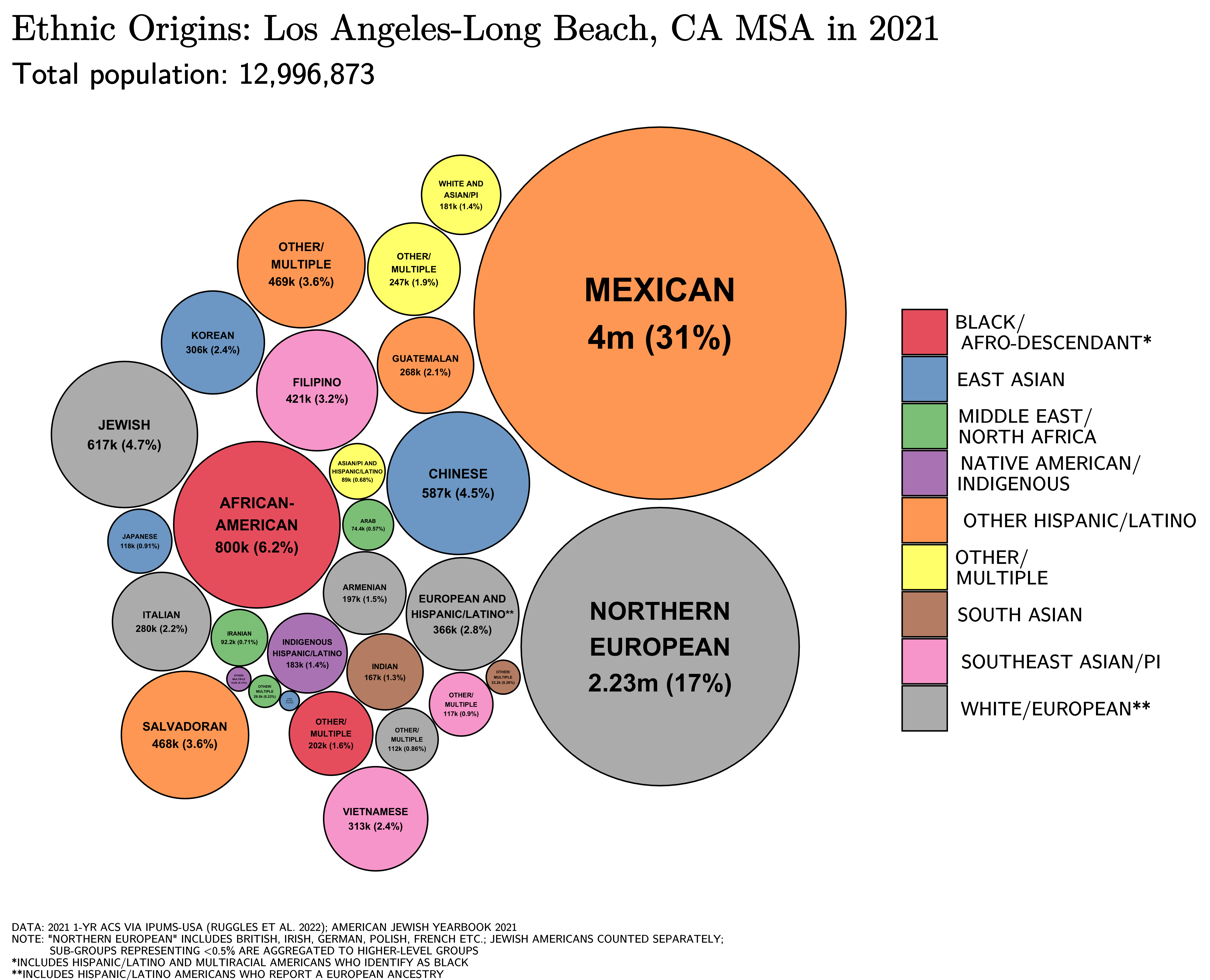
Ethnic origins in LA and Orange Counties

Non-Hispanic whites make up under one-third (29.4%) of the population, approximately 5,477,462 residents. The top European ancestries were German: 7.0% (1,301,202), English: 6.1% (1,131,426), Irish: 5.4% (1,002,233), Italian: 3.4% (624,585), Scandinavian: 2.2% (405,887), French: 1.5% (284,180), Scottish: 1.4% (264,429), Polish: 1.2% (224,443), and Russian: 1.0% (189,115). The top Middle Eastern ancestries were Jewish: 3.2% (600,000), Armenian: 1.2% (214.190), Arab: 0.98% (182,934), and Iranian: 0.75% (139,632). Additionally, 3.3% (611,193) of residents identified as simply American. Values may add to over 100% because people can identify with more than one ethnicity.

Approximately 2,577,706 residents are Asian of non-Hispanic origin. Asians of non-Hispanic origin make up 13.8% of the population, about 1.4% South Asian (Indian Subcontinent), and about 12.4% were East or Southeast Asian. The six largest Asian ancestries with respect to all of Greater LA's population were Chinese: ~ 6.1%, Filipino: ~ 3.1%, Vietnamese: ~ 2.0%, Korean ~ 1.9%, Indian ~ 1.1%, and Japanese ~ 0.8%. Other important Asian American groups include Cambodian, Laotian, Hmong, Taiwanese, Pakistani, and Thai Americans.

Non-Hispanic blacks make up 6.1% of the population. Approximately 1,143,781 residents are non-Hispanic blacks. Sub-Saharan Africans were 0.7% (137,443) and Non-Hispanic Caribbean Blacks were 0.3% (62,419).

Non-Hispanic Native Americans make up 0.2% of the population (46,143).

Non-Hispanic Native Hawaiians and other Pacific Islanders make up 0.2% of the population. Approximately 42,591 residents are Native Hawaiian or of other Pacific Islander ancestries. The largest Pacific Islander ancestries were Samoan, Native Hawaiian, and Guamanian or Chamorro, and Tongan

Non-Hispanic Multiracial people make up 3.3% of the population. Approximately 624,473 people are non-Hispanic multiracial.

People who listed "other" as their race made up 0.5% (102,434) of the population.

Source: data.census.gov. Retrieved on April 15, 2023.

==== Hispanic or Latino origin ====
Hispanic or Latinos, who may be of any race, are by far the largest group; Hispanics or Latinos make up 46.3% of the population. They outnumber every other racial group. Approximately 8,630,090 residents are Hispanic or Latino. The largest Hispanic or Latino ancestry was by far Mexican, with other important groups being Salvadoran, Guatemalan, Honduran, Peruvian, Puerto Rican, Colombian, and Cuban.

== Ethnic enclaves ==
Ethnic enclaves like Chinatown, the Byzantine-Latino Quarter, Historic Filipinotown, Little Saigon, Little Armenia, Little Ethiopia, Little Bangladesh, Little Moscow (in Hollywood), Little Tokyo, Croatian Place and Via Italia in San Pedro, several Koreatowns, Tehrangeles in West Los Angeles, the Chinese enclaves in the San Gabriel Valley and Thai Town provide examples of the polyglot multicultural character of Los Angeles. Below is a list of many ethnic enclaves present in the Los Angeles metropolitan area.

== Politics ==
United States presidential election results for Los Angeles-Anaheim-Riverside Consolidated Statistical Area (Counties of Los Angeles, Orange, Ventura, Riverside and San Bernardino)
Year	Republican		Democratic		Third party(ies)	
Year	No.	%	No.	%	No.	%
2024	2,845,661	39.44%	4,146,160	57.47%	223,275	3.09%
2020	2,799,636	34.79%	5,078,481	63.11%	169,472	2.11%
2016	2,013,697	31.52%	3,983,255	62.35%	391,977	6.14%
2012	2,196,108	37.39%	3,534,444	60.17%	143,577	2.44%
2008	2,099,609	37.28%	3,425,319	60.82%	107,147	1.90%
2004	2,490,150	45.34%	2,932,429	53.39%	69,649	1.27%
2000	2,003,114	41.26%	2,652,907	54.65%	198,750	4.09%
1996	1,661,209	38.35%	2,220,837	51.27%	449,706	10.38%
1992	1,657,151	33.83%	2,202,345	44.96%	1,038,448	21.20%
1988	2,408,696	53.79%	2,014,670	44.99%	54,441	1.22%
1984	2,614,904	60.62%	1,650,231	38.26%	48,225	1.12%
1980	2,187,859	55.47%	1,381,285	35.02%	374,993	9.51%
1976	1,877,267	50.75%	1,728,532	46.73%	93,554	2.53%
1972	2,346,127	57.69%	1,573,708	38.70%	146,653	3.61%
1968	1,836,478	50.26%	1,570,478	42.98%	247,280	6.77%
1964	1,578,837	44.01%	2,006,184	55.92%	2,488	0.07%
1960	1,677,962	50.83%	1,612,924	48.86%	10,524	0.32%

Greater Los Angeles is a politically divided metropolitan area. During the 1970s and 1980s, the region leaned toward the Republican Party. Los Angeles County, the most populous of the region, is a Democratic stronghold, although it voted twice for both Richard Nixon (1968 and 1972) and Ronald Reagan (1980 and 1984). Riverside County, San Bernardino County, and Orange County have historically leaned toward the Republican Party but have started shifting leftward in recent years. Ventura County is politically divided.

== Economy ==
The Los Angeles metropolitan area has the third-largest metropolitan economy in the world, behind the Greater Tokyo Area and the New York metropolitan area. In 2022, the combined statistical area of Greater Los Angeles (which includes the Los Angeles metropolitan area, the Inland Empire, and Ventura County) had a $1.528 trillion economy.

Los Angeles and Orange Counties together have an economy of roughly $1.227 trillion. Important are coastal California land values and the rents they command, which contribute heavily to GDP earnings, though there are worries that these high land values contribute to the long-term problem of housing affordability and are thus a possible risk to future GDP increase. This is evident when comparing the coast with the Inland Empire, a large component of the five-county combined statistical area (CSA) that nevertheless contributes a far smaller portion to regional gross metropolitan product but still dominates in industry. The Greater Los Angeles CSA is the third-largest economic center in the world, after Greater Tokyo and the New York-Newark-Bridgeport CSA.

Greater Los Angeles is a hotspot for Asian car manufacturers. Specifically, Mitsubishi, Hyundai, Honda, and Mazda have their U.S. headquarters in the area. Nissan and Toyota were headquartered in the area in the recent past as well. (Nissan moved to Tennessee; Toyota moved to Texas.)

The economy of the Los Angeles metropolitan area is famously and heavily based on the entertainment industry, with a particular focus on television, motion pictures, interactive games, and recorded music – the Hollywood district of Los Angeles and its surrounding areas are known as the "movie capital of the United States" due to the region's extreme commercial and historical importance to the American motion picture industry. Other significant sectors include shipping/international trade – particularly at the adjacent Port of Los Angeles and Port of Long Beach, together comprising the United States' busiest seaport – logistics – the Inland Empire being the largest concentration of warehousing and intermodal facilities in the world – as well as aerospace, technology, petroleum, fashion and apparel, and tourism.

The City of Los Angeles was previously home to five Fortune 500 companies: energy company Occidental Petroleum (until 2014 when it moved its headquarters to Houston), healthcare provider Health Net, metals distributor Reliance Steel & Aluminum, engineering firm AECOM, and real estate group CB Richard Ellis. As of 2024, all of these companies have moved elsewhere. Other companies headquartered in Los Angeles include American Apparel, City National Bank, 20th Century Studios, Latham & Watkins, Univision, Metro Interactive, LLC, Premier America, Gibson, Dunn & Crutcher, DeviantArt, Guess?, O'Melveny & Myers; Paul, Hastings, Janofsky & Walker, Tokyopop, The Jim Henson Company, Paramount Pictures, Sunkist Growers, Incorporated, Tutor Perini, Fox Sports Net, Capital Group, and The Coffee Bean & Tea Leaf. Korean Air's US passenger and cargo operations headquarters are in two separate offices in Los Angeles. Entertainment and media giant The Walt Disney Company is headquartered in nearby Burbank.

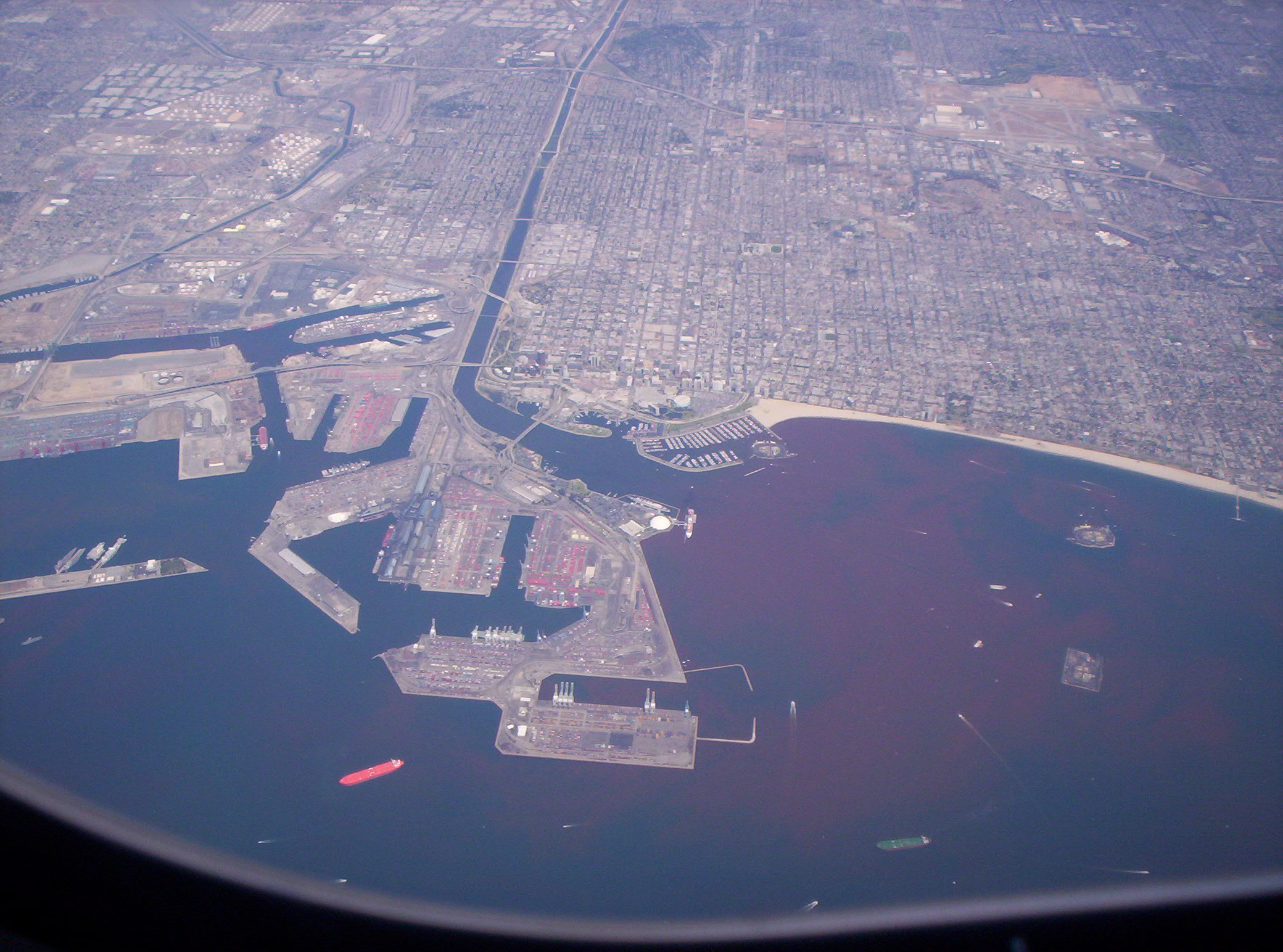
Port of Long Beach

The Port of Los Angeles and Port of Long Beach together comprise the fifth-busiest port in the world, being the center of imports and exports for trade on the west Pacific Coast as well as being one of the most significant ports of the Western Hemisphere. The Port of Los Angeles occupies 7,500 acres (3,035 hectares) of land and water along 43 miles (69 kilometres) of waterfront and is the busiest container port in the United States. The Port is the busiest port in the United States by container volume, the 8th busiest container port in the world. The top trading partners in 2004 were: China ($68.8 billion), Japan ($24.1 billion), Taiwan ($10.8 billion), Thailand ($6.7 billion), & South Korea ($5.6 billion)

The Port of Long Beach is the second-busiest container port in the United States. It adjoins the separate Port of Los Angeles. Acting as a major gateway for U.S.-Asian trade, the port occupies 3,200 acres (1,295 hectares) of land with 25 miles (40 kilometres) of waterfront in the city of Long Beach, California. The seaport has approximately $100 billion in trade and provides more than 316,000 jobs in Southern California. The Port of Long Beach imports and exports more than $100 billion worth of goods every year. The seaport provides the country with jobs, generates tax revenue, and supports retail and manufacturing businesses.

=== Economic statistics for Los Angeles and Orange Counties ===
In 2014, the population of the Long Beach–Los Angeles–Anaheim metropolitan statistical area (MSA) reached 13,262,220 and ranked second in the United States – a 1 percent increase from 2013. In 2014, Los Angeles–Long Beach–Anaheim had a per capita personal income (PCPI) of $50,751 and ranked 29th in the country.

In 2014, Los Angeles–Long Beach–Anaheim placed third among the largest exporters in the United States (shipment totaling to $75.5 billion). The metro accounted for 40.8 percent of California's merchandise exports, mainly exporting computer and electronic products ($18.6 billion); transportation equipment ($15.3 billion) and chemicals ($5.6 billion). Nonetheless, the greater Los Angeles metro has immensely benefited from the free trade agreements: greater Los Angeles exported $25.1 billion to the NAFTA region and $776 million in goods to the CAFTA region.

Overall, in 2014 the average wages and salaries reached $57,519 (in 2010, the average wages and salaries reached $54,729). Meanwhile, the median household income in 2014 was $56,935, a 1.4 percent increase from 2013 (average median household income was $56,164).

== Utilities and infrastructure ==
There are nine electric utility power companies in the Los Angeles metropolitan area. Southern California Edison serves a large majority of the Los Angeles metropolitan area except for Los Angeles city limits, Burbank, Glendale, Pasadena, Azusa, Vernon, Anaheim, and southern Orange County. Southern Orange County is part of the Los Angeles metropolitan area and it is served by San Diego Gas & Electric. There are three natural gas providers in the metropolitan area. Southern California Gas Company serves a large majority of the Los Angeles metropolitan area except for Long Beach and southern Orange County.

== Medical facilities ==
Greater Los Angeles is one of the world's largest patient destinations. The Los Angeles Medical Services provide quality medical services and specialty care services to the populations served in compliance with local, state and federal regulations as well as human rights protection.

Los Angeles and Orange counties have separate medical service department but both work jointly. Government and Private hospitals open normally Monday through Friday, excluding City Holidays but some speciality hospitals are open year-round.

The main healthcare providers in the Los Angeles metropolitan area are Kaiser Permanente, Cedars-Sinai Health System, UCLA Health, Dignity Healthcare, and Providence Healthcare. LA Care and Care1st are also the main providers for those in the metropolitan area that have Medi-Cal.

== Events ==
Major events include:

- 626 Night Market
- BNP Paribas Open
- LA Auto Show
- Laguna Beach Pageant of the Masters
- Los Angeles Film Festival
- Newport Beach Christmas boat parade
- Palm Springs International Film Festival
- Rose Parade
- Sawdust Art Festival
- Temecula Valley Balloon & Wine Festival
- Vans U.S. Open of Surfing

=== Awards ceremonies ===
- Academy Awards
- Primetime Emmy Awards
- Golden Globes
- Grammy Awards
- Screen Actors Guild Awards

== Tourism ==
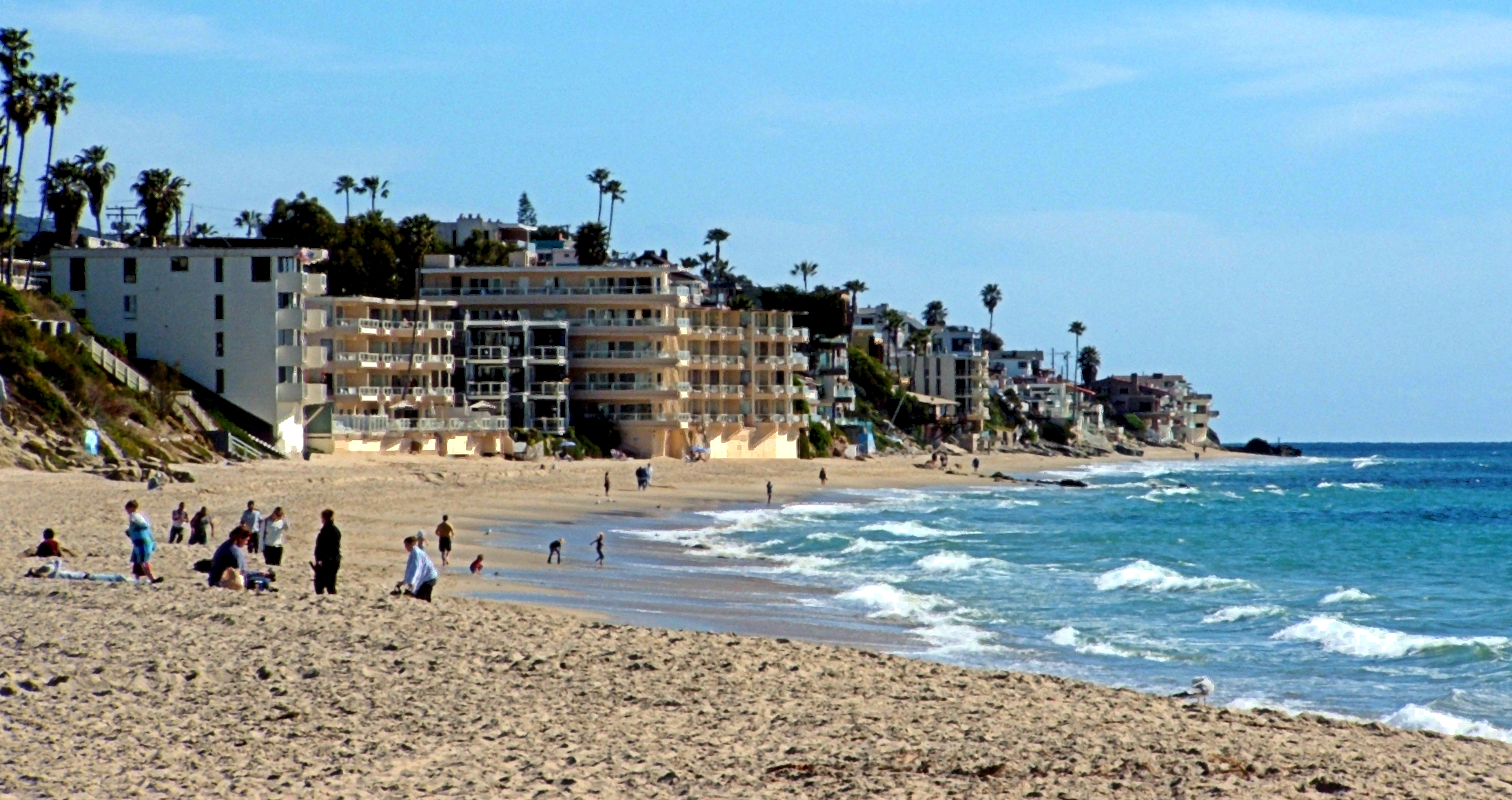
Laguna Beach coastline is popular for sunbathers

Greater Los Angeles is one of the most visited areas in the world. It is known for its temperate weather, its popular beaches and amusements, its cultural centers and its natural beauty. In the year 1999, a total of 23.8 million visitors stayed for at least one night.

== Area and ZIP codes ==
=== Area codes ===
- 213 – Downtown Los Angeles, surrounded by 323 (October 1947)
- 310/424 – Santa Monica, Malibu, Pacific Palisades, Compton, Lynwood, Torrance, Beverly Hills, Catalina Island; the southwestern portion of Los Angeles County. (Split from 213 on November 2, 1991; overlaid by 424 on August 26, 2006)
- 323 – a ring around downtown Los Angeles, including the Hollywood and Eagle Rock neighborhoods of Los Angeles; South Los Angeles; the cities of South Gate, Huntington Park, Vernon, Walnut Park, Florence, Bell, Bell Gardens, Cudahy, Montebello, and East Los Angeles. (Split from 213 on June 13, 1998)
- 442/760 – Coachella Valley, including Palm Springs and Indio; Victor Valley, including Victorville and Apple Valley
- 562 – Long Beach, Downey, Whittier; Norwalk, Lakewood, Bellflower, Paramount, Cerritos, southeast Los Angeles County, and a small portion of coastal Orange County. (Split from 310 on January 25, 1997)
- 626 – Pasadena, Monterey Park, Rowland Heights, Alhambra, and West Covina; the San Gabriel Valley, and eastern suburbs of Los Angeles. (Split from 818 on June 14, 1997)
- 657/714 – Anaheim, Huntington Beach, Santa Ana, Orange, Garden Grove; northern and western Orange County (Overlaid by 657 on September 23, 2008)
- 747/818 – the cities of Burbank, Glendale, San Fernando; the North Hollywood, Van Nuys, Panorama City, Sherman Oaks, and Northridge neighborhoods of Los Angeles; the San Fernando Valley. (Split from 213 on January 7, 1984)
- 805/820 – Ventura County, including the cities of Oxnard, Simi Valley, Thousand Oaks, and Ventura
- 909/840 – Southwest San Bernardino County, a small portion of Riverside County, and the far eastern L.A. County suburbs of Pomona, Walnut, Diamond Bar, San Dimas, La Verne, and Claremont. (Split from 714 on November 14, 1992)
- 949 – Irvine, Laguna Beach, Newport Beach, San Juan Capistrano; southern and eastern Orange County. (Split from 714 on April 18, 1998)
- 951 – Corona, Hemet, Jurupa Valley, Lake Elsinore, Menifee, Moreno Valley, Riverside, Temecula; western end of Riverside County. (Split from 909 on July 17, 2004)

== Media ==
The Los Angeles metropolitan area is home to the headquarters of several well-known media companies including: the Los Angeles Times, Fox Broadcasting Company, Universal Studios, and The Walt Disney Company. Local television channels broadcasting to the Los Angeles market include KCBS-TV 2 (CBS), KNBC 4 (NBC), KTLA 5 (The CW), KABC 7 (ABC), KCAL-TV 9 (Independent), KTTV 11 (Fox), KCOP 13 (MyNetworkTV), KCET 28, (PBS), KPXN-TV 30 (Ion), KMEX-DT 34 (Univision), KVEA 52 (Telemundo) and KLCS 58 (PBS). Radio stations serving the area include: KKJZ, KIIS, KNX (AM), and KMZT.

== Education ==
=== Primary and secondary education ===
The Los Angeles Unified School District serves the city of L.A., and other school districts serve the surrounding areas. A number of private schools are also located in the region.

=== Higher education ===
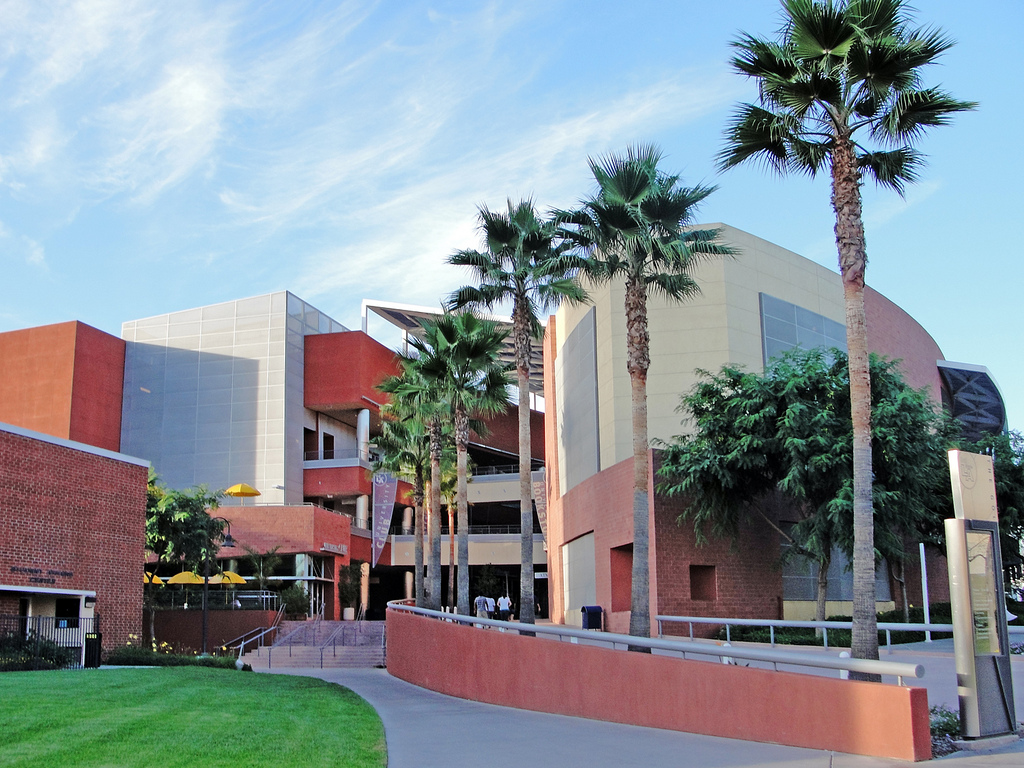
Cal State LA's The Golden Eagle, consisting of two adjoining structures separated by a promenade.

Greater Los Angeles is home to a number of colleges and universities. The University of Southern California and University of California, Los Angeles, are among the largest, and the Claremont Colleges and California Institute of Technology are among the most academically renowned. Below is a list of some of the most well known colleges and universities within the Los Angeles Metropolitan Area.

- Art Center College of Design
- Azusa Pacific University
- Biola University
- California Baptist University
- California Lutheran University
- California State University, Channel Islands
- California State University, Dominguez Hills
- California State University, Fullerton
- California State University, Northridge
- California State University, Long Beach
- California State University, Los Angeles
- California State University, San Bernardino
- California State Polytechnic University, Pomona
- California Institute of Technology
- Chapman University
- Claremont Colleges
- Laguna College of Art and Design
- Loma Linda University
- Loyola Marymount University
- Otis College of Art and Design
- University of California, Irvine
- University of California, Los Angeles
- University of California, Riverside
- University of Southern California
- University of La Verne
- University of Redlands
- Pepperdine University
- Soka University of America
- Vanguard University
- West Coast University

== Transportation ==
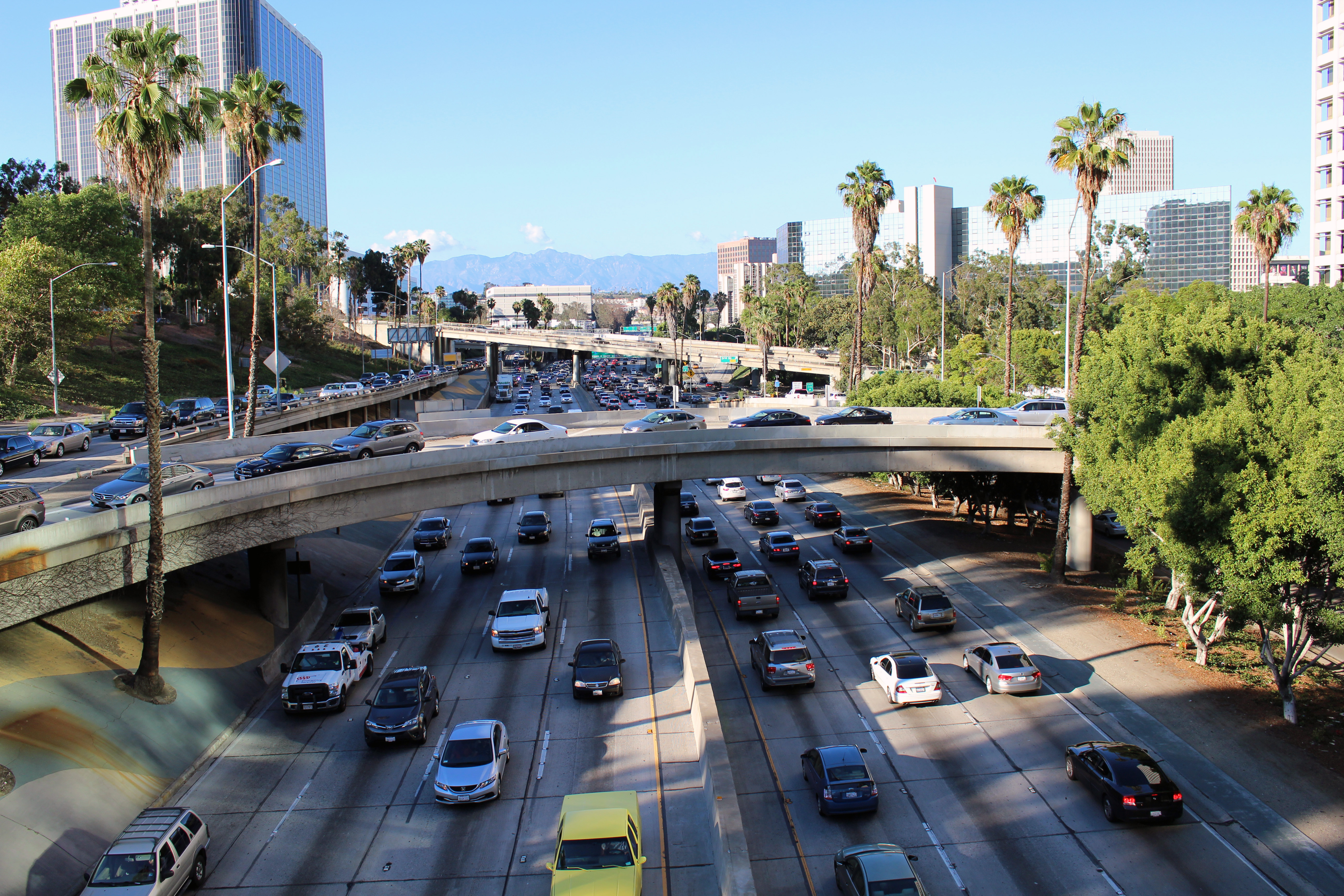
Rush hour on the Harbor Freeway, Downtown

Greater Los Angeles is known for its expansive transportation network. Most notable is its extensive highway system. The area is a junction for numerous interstates coming from the north, east, and south and contains the three principal north–south highways in California: Interstate 5, U.S. Route 101, and California State Route 1. The area is also home to several ports, including the twin ports of Long Beach and Los Angeles, which are the two busiest in the United States, as well as Port of Hueneme. Additionally, the region is also served by the Los Angeles Metro Rail and Metrolink commuter rail systems that link neighborhoods of Los Angeles with immediate surrounding suburbs and most of the region (excluding the outer region of the Inland Empire) with Oceanside in San Diego County, respectively. Los Angeles International Airport (LAX) is the principal international airport of the region and is one of the busiest in the world. Other airports include Ontario International Airport (ONT), John Wayne Airport (SNA), Hollywood Burbank Airport (BUR), Long Beach Municipal Airport (LGB), and Palm Springs International Airport (PSP).

=== Historic streetcar network ===
Los Angeles Pacific Electric (Red Cars) network

The Pacific Electric Railway Company, nicknamed the Red Cars, was a privately owned mass transit system in Southern California consisting of electrically powered streetcars, interurban cars, and buses and was the largest electric railway system in the world in the 1920s. Organized around the city centers of Los Angeles and San Bernardino, it connected cities in Los Angeles County, Orange County, San Bernardino County and Riverside County.

The system shared dual gauge track with the 3 ft 6 in (1,067 mm) narrow gauge Los Angeles Railway, "Yellow Car", or "LARy" system on Main Street in downtown Los Angeles (directly in front of the 6th and Main terminal), on 4th Street, and along Hawthorne Boulevard south of downtown Los Angeles toward the cities of Hawthorne, Gardena, and Torrance.

=== Commercial airports ===
Location of commercial airports in the Greater Los Angeles area
Green = International airport
Blue = Domestic airport

Airport	IATA code	County	Enplanements (2013)
Los Angeles International Airport	LAX	Los Angeles	32,425,892
John Wayne Airport	SNA	Orange County	4,540,628
Ontario International Airport	ONT	San Bernardino	1,970,538
Hollywood Burbank Airport	BUR	Los Angeles	1,918,011
Long Beach Airport	LGB	Los Angeles	1,438,756
San Bernardino International Airport	SBD	San Bernardino	N/A
Hawthorne Municipal Airport	HHR	Los Angeles	N/A
Van Nuys Airport	VNY	Los Angeles	N/A

The primary airport serving the LA metro area is Los Angeles International Airport (LAX), one of the busiest airports in the United States. LAX is in southwestern Los Angeles, 16 miles (26 km) from Downtown Los Angeles. LAX is the only airport to serve as a hub for all three U.S. legacy airlines —American, Delta and United.

In addition to LAX, other airports, including Hollywood Burbank Airport, John Wayne Airport, Long Beach Airport, Ontario International Airport, and San Bernardino International Airport also serve the region.

=== Bridges ===
The Los Angeles metropolitan area has only one suspension bridge: Vincent Thomas Bridge in San Pedro, and one cable-stayed bridge: Long Beach International Gateway in Long Beach.

=== Interstate Highways ===
- Golden State Freeway/Santa Ana Freeway/San Diego Freeway (I-5)
- Santa Monica Freeway/Rosa Parks Freeway/San Bernardino Freeway (I-10)
- Escondido Freeway/Temecula Valley Freeway/Corona Freeway/Ontario Freeway/Mojave Freeway (I-15)
- Glenn Anderson Freeway/Century Freeway (I-105)
- Harbor Freeway (I-110)
- Foothill Freeway (I-210)
- Escondido Freeway/Armed Forces Freeway/Barstow Freeway (I-215)
- San Diego Freeway (I-405)
- San Gabriel River Freeway (I-605)
- Long Beach Freeway (I-710)

=== U.S. Highways ===
- Will Rogers Highway (Former Route 66)
- Pacific Highway (Former US 99)
- Santa Ana Freeway/Hollywood Freeway/Ventura Freeway (US 101)

=== California State Highways ===
- SR 1
- SR 2
- SR 14
- SR 18
- SR 19
- SR 22
- SR 23
- SR 27
- SR 33
- SR 34
- SR 39
- SR 47
- SR 55
- SR 57
- SR 60
- SR 66
- SR 71
- SR 72
- SR 73
- SR 74
- SR 83
- SR 90
- SR 91
- SR 103
- SR 107
- SR 110
- SR 118
- SR 126
- SR 133
- SR 134
- SR 138
- SR 142
- SR 170
- SR 187
- SR 210
- SR 213
- SR 241
- SR 261
- SR 710

=== Los Angeles County Metro ===
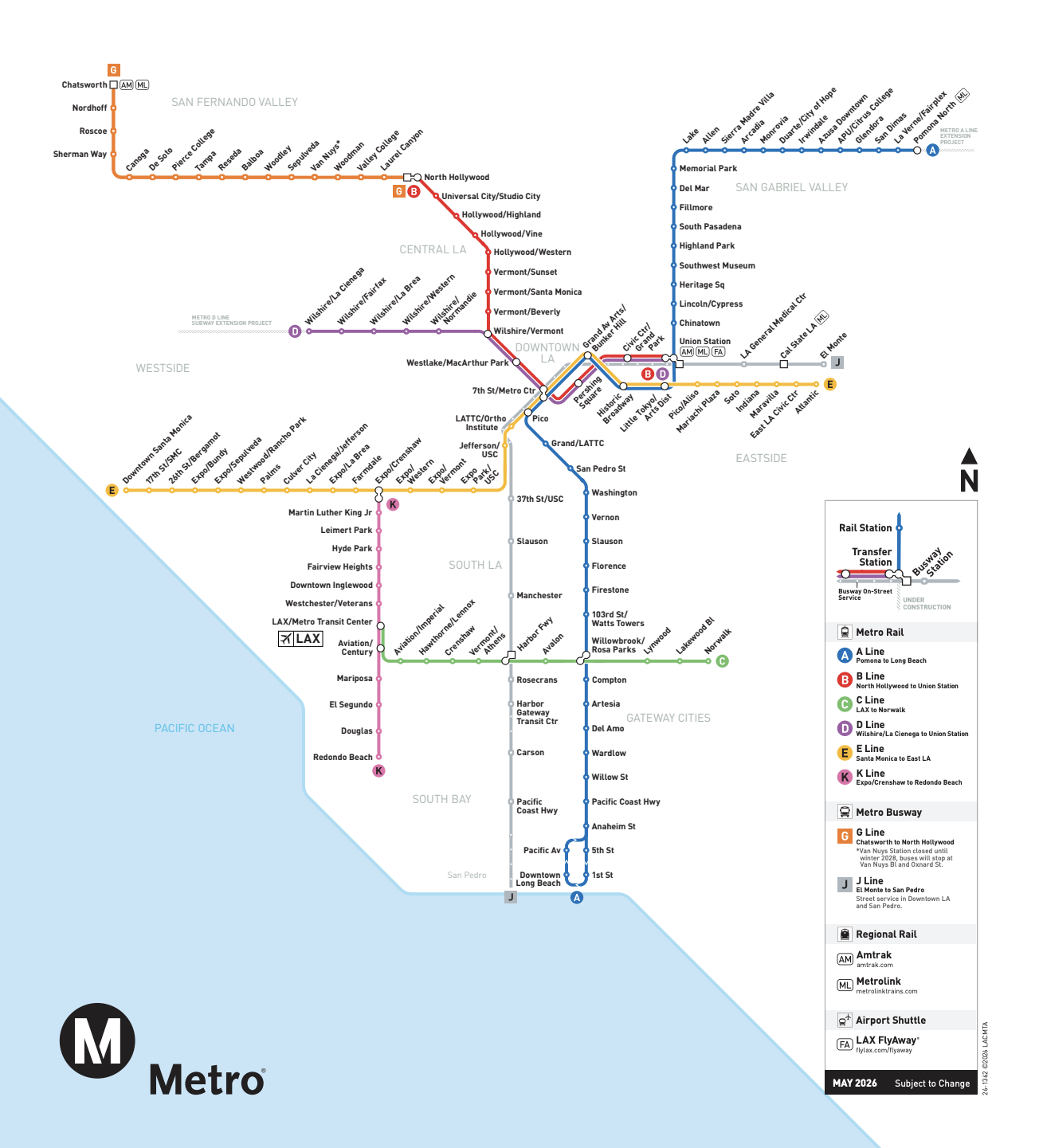
Map of LA County Metro

The Los Angeles Metro Rail is the mass transit rail system of Los Angeles County. It is run by the Los Angeles County Metropolitan Transportation Authority and its system runs six rail lines throughout Los Angeles County. Metro Rail currently operates four light rail and two rapid transit lines, altogether totaling 115.5 miles (185.9 km) of rail, 101 stations, and over 360,000 daily weekday boardings as of December 2012.

- The A Line – light rail
- The B Line – rapid transit
- The C Line – light rail
- The D Line – rapid transit
- The E Line – light rail
- The G Line – bus rapid transit
- The J Line – bus rapid transit
- The K Line – light rail

The system's light rail lines are the second busiest LRT system in the United States, after Boston, by number of riders, with 200,300 average weekday boardings during the third quarter of 2012. By 2019, it had become the most heavily ridden light rail system in the country.

Since the region of the city is in close proximity to a major fault area the tunnels were built to resist earthquakes of up to magnitude 7.5. Both subway lines use an electrified third rail to provide power to the trains, rendering these lines unusable on the other three. The Blue and Gold Lines run mostly at grade, with some street-running, elevated, and underground stretches in the more densely populated areas of Los Angeles. The Green Line is entirely grade separated, running in the median of I-105 and then turning southward along an elevated route.

LA Metro also operates an extensive bus system with 117 routes, operates a microtransit service in eight zones, and funds independent transit operators throughout Los Angeles County such as Foothill Transit, Long Beach Transit, Santa Monica Big Blue Bus, and LADOT Transit.

=== Other authorities ===
In addition to Metro, other providers provide local service within their jurisdictions. These include the Orange County Transportation Authority, San Bernardino County Transportation Authority, and Riverside Transit Agency.

=== Regional and commuter rail ===
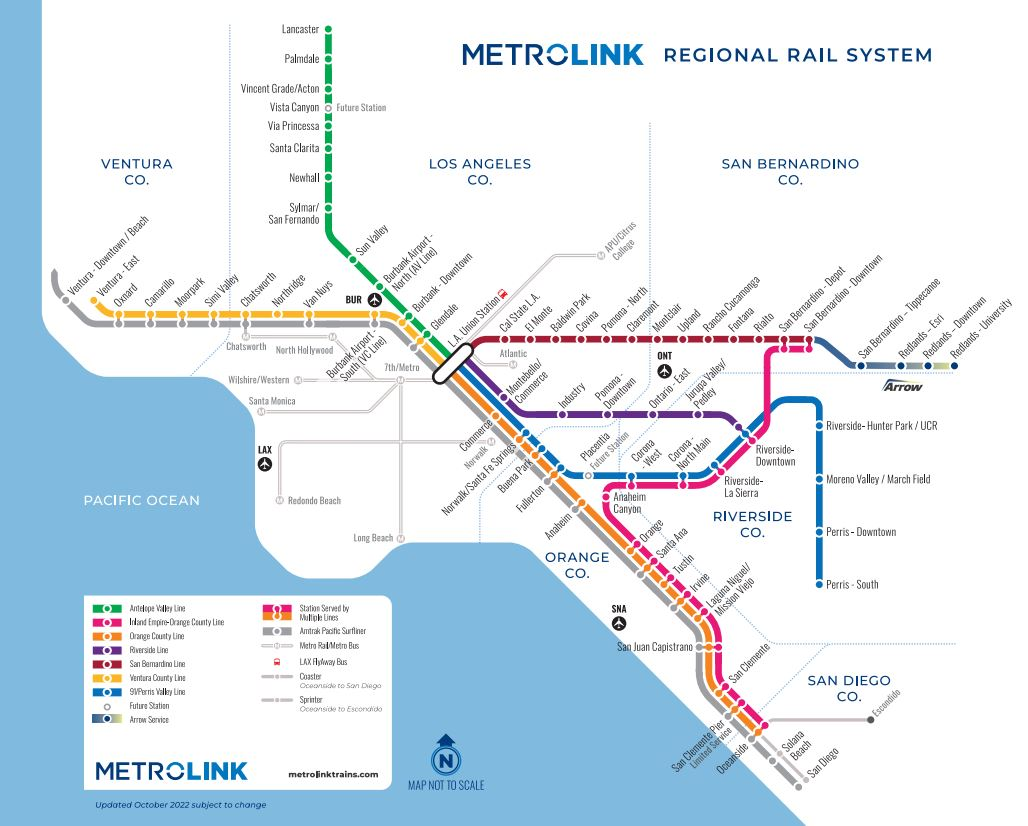
Map of Metrolink

There are two providers of heavy rail transportation in the region, Amtrak and Metrolink. Amtrak provides service to San Diego, Santa Barbara, San Luis Obispo, and points in between on the Pacific Surfliner. It also provides long-distance routes, including the Coast Starlight which goes to the San Francisco Bay Area, Portland, Oregon, and Seattle, Washington; the Southwest Chief which goes to Flagstaff, Arizona, Albuquerque, New Mexico, Kansas City, Missouri and Chicago; and the Sunset Limited which provides limited service (three days a week) to Tucson, El Paso, Houston, and New Orleans.

Metrolink provides service to numerous places within Southern California, including all counties in the region. Metrolink operates to 67 stations on eight lines within Southern California which mostly (except for the Inland Empire–Orange County Line and Arrow) radiate from Los Angeles Union Station.

== Sports ==
=== Professional teams ===
As a whole, the Los Angeles area has more national championships, all sports combined (college and professional), than any other city in the United States, with over four times as many championships as the entire state of Texas, and just over twice that of New York City. It is the only American city to host the summer Olympic games twice: once in 1932, and more recently in 1984 (Lake Placid hosted the winter Olympic games twice: once in 1932 and once in 1980). Los Angeles will also be the host of the 2028 Summer Olympics, becoming the third city to host three Olympic Games, after London and Paris.

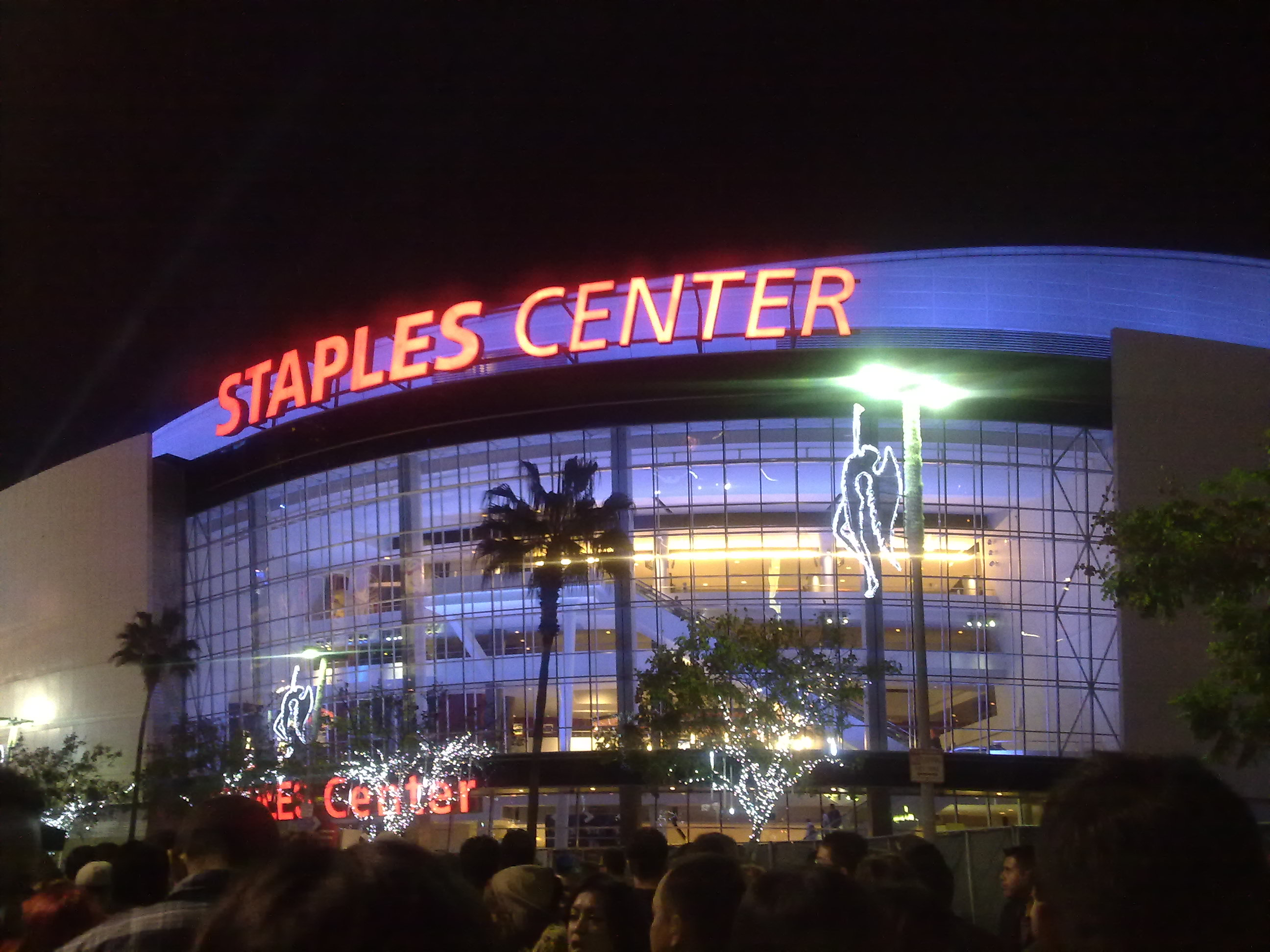
Staples Center (now Crypto.com Arena) in Downtown Los Angeles

=== Table of professional teams and venues ===
Team	Sport	League	Venue
Los Angeles Rams	American football	National Football League	SoFi Stadium
Los Angeles Chargers	American football	National Football League	SoFi Stadium
Los Angeles Dodgers	Baseball	Major League Baseball	Dodger Stadium
Los Angeles Angels	Baseball	Major League Baseball	Angel Stadium
Los Angeles Clippers	Basketball	National Basketball Association	Intuit Dome
Los Angeles Lakers	Basketball	National Basketball Association	Crypto.com Arena
Los Angeles Sparks	Basketball	Women's National Basketball Association	Crypto.com Arena
Los Angeles Kings	Ice hockey	National Hockey League	Crypto.com Arena
Anaheim Ducks	Ice hockey	National Hockey League	Honda Center
LA Galaxy	Soccer	Major League Soccer	Dignity Health Sports Park
Los Angeles FC	Soccer	Major League Soccer	BMO Stadium
Angel City FC	Soccer	National Women's Soccer League	BMO Stadium

Other professional venues include:

- Auto Club Raceway, Pomona
- John C. Argue Swim Stadium
- Long Beach Marine Stadium
- Los Alamitos Race Course
- Los Angeles Memorial Coliseum
- Pico Rivera Sports Arena
- Rose Bowl
- Santa Anita Park
- Kia Forum
- VELO Sports Center

=== NCAA Division I college sports ===
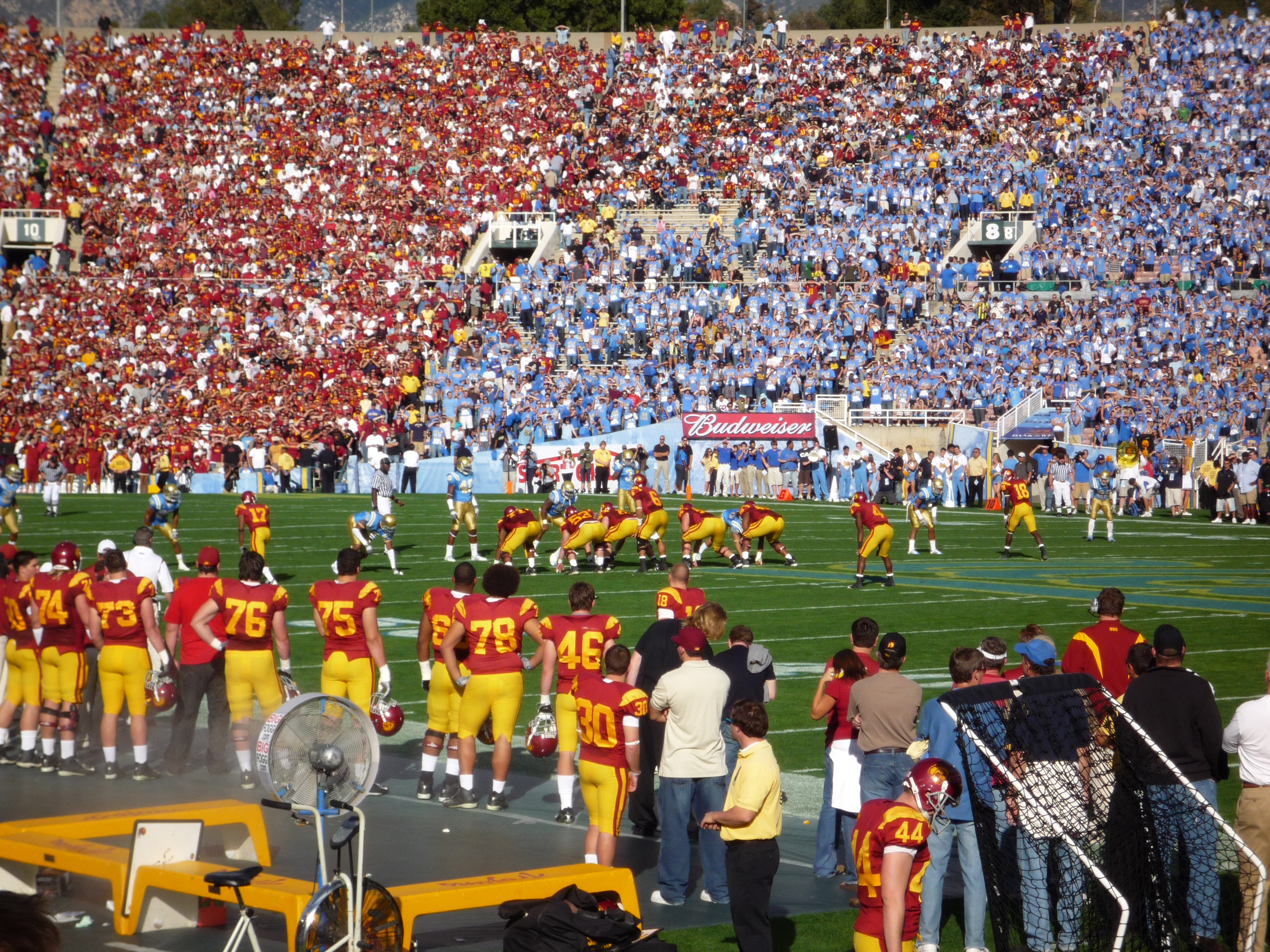
UCLA–USC rivalry; both are located in LA and members of the Pac-12 Conference, and moved together to the Big Ten Conference in 2024. The rivalry is unusual in the National Collegiate Athletic Association (NCAA) Division I sports, because the campuses are only 12 miles (19 km) apart, and located within the same city.

- California Baptist Lancers
- Cal State Fullerton Titans
- Cal State Northridge Matadors
- Long Beach State Beach
- Loyola Marymount Lions
- Pepperdine Waves
- UC Irvine Anteaters
- UC Riverside Highlanders
- UCLA Bruins (FBS)
- USC Trojans (FBS)

=== Other sports ===
The Greater Los Angeles area also has three well-known horse racing facilities: Santa Anita Park, Los Alamitos Race Course and the former Hollywood Park Racetrack and three major motorsport venues: Long Beach street circuit, Auto Club Raceway at Pomona and the demolished Auto Club Speedway. In addition, the city of Los Angeles hosted the Summer Olympics in 1932 and 1984.

For over twenty years the Los Angeles area media market lacked a National Football League team. After the 1994 season, the Los Angeles Rams moved to St. Louis, Missouri, and the Los Angeles Raiders returned to their original home of Oakland, California, due to the lack of an up-to-date NFL stadium. After numerous stadium proposals between 1995 and 2016 in an attempt to bring the NFL back, the Oakland Raiders, St. Louis Rams, and San Diego Chargers all submitted plans to relocate back to Los Angeles after the 2015 NFL season. On January 12, 2016, the Rams were approved to move to Los Angeles and build the venue eventually known as SoFi Stadium with the Chargers or Raiders given the option to join them. On January 12, 2017, the Chargers announced their move to Los Angeles to join the Rams. Both teams share SoFi Stadium in Inglewood, California.

== Panoramas ==
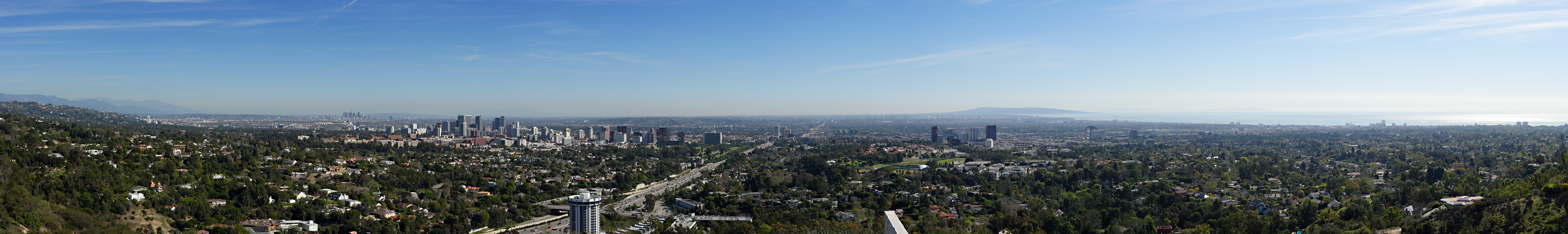
Central Los Angeles and the Westside, as viewed from the Getty Center in the Santa Monica Mountains. San Gabriel Mountains at back left, Downtown Los Angeles skyline at center-left, Century City and Westwood in the foreground and to their right, the 405 Freeway. The Brentwood skyline, the hills of the Palos Verdes Peninsula at back right and the Pacific Ocean at far right.
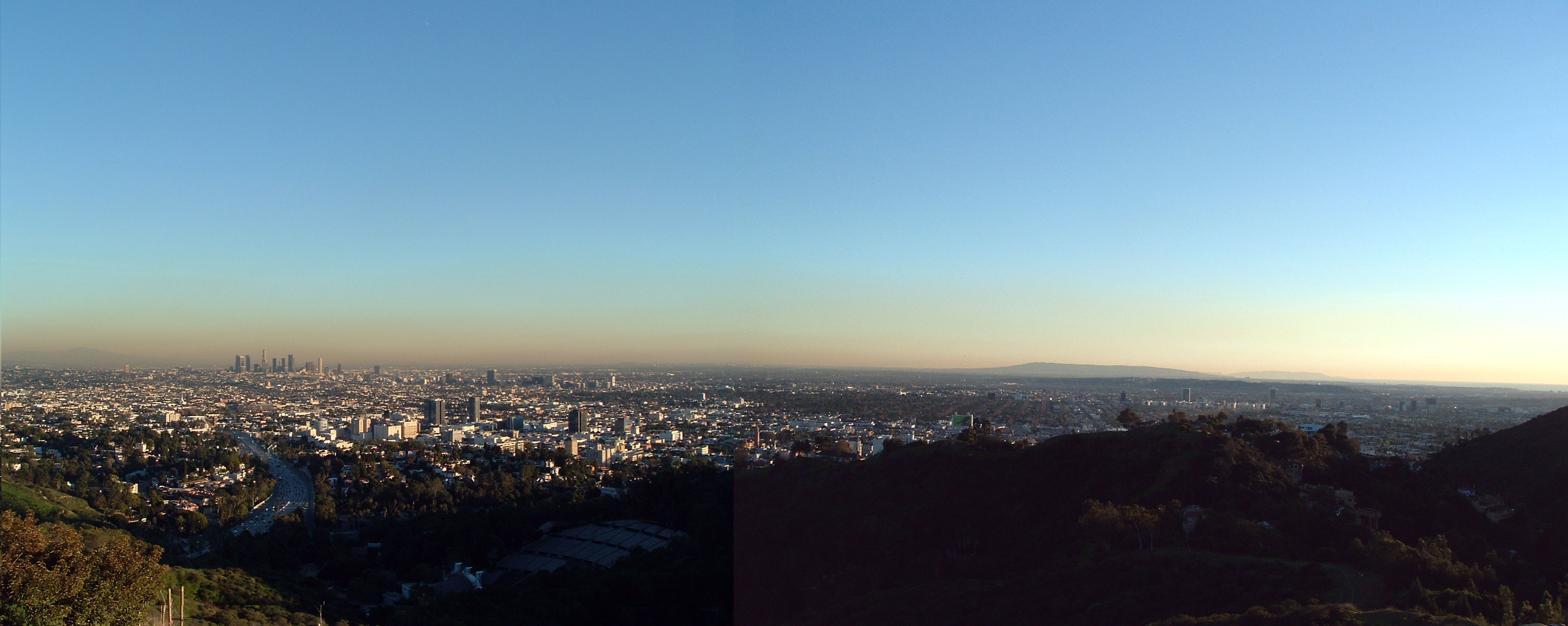
The Los Angeles Basin, viewed south from Mulholland Drive. From left to right can be seen the Santa Ana Mountains / Saddleback (horizon), downtown L.A., the Hollywood Bowl (foreground), Mid-Wilshire, Long Beach – Palos Verdes (background), Catalina Island (horizon), the South Bay and Pacific Ocean.

== See also ==
- Media related to Greater Los Angeles Area at Wikimedia Commons
- California megapolitan areas
- California statistical areas
- List of hotels in Los Angeles
- List of metropolitan areas in the Americas
