= Alphonzo Bell =

American oil multi-millionaire (1875–1947)

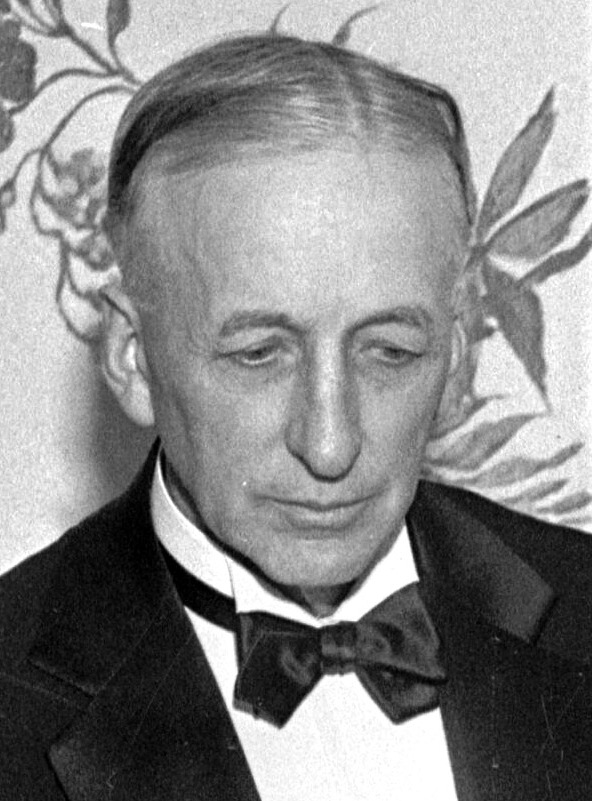
- Born: Alphonzo Edward Bell; September 29, 1875; Los Angeles, California, U.S.
- Died: December 27, 1947 (aged 72); Los Angeles, California, U.S.
- Education: San Enselmo Presbyterian College; Occidental College
- Occupations: real estate developer, philanthropist, champion tennis player
- Spouse: Minnewa Shoemaker Bell
- Children: Alphonzo E. Bell Jr. Minnewa Bell Gray Burnside Ross
- Parent(s): Susan Albiah Hollenbeck Wells Bell; James George Bell
- Relatives: John Edward Hollenbeck (uncle); Elliott Roosevelt (son-in-law); Marian McCargo (daughter-in-law)

Alphonzo Edward Bell Sr. (September 29, 1875 – December 27, 1947) was an American oil multi-millionaire, real estate developer, philanthropist, and champion tennis player. The westside Los Angeles residential community of Bel Air is named after him, as well as the Southern California communities of Bell and Bell Gardens.

== Family and background ==
Bell was a native and lifelong resident of Los Angeles, whose family had deep financial and historical ties to the area, and played a key role in the history and development of Southern California. He was the son of James George Bell, who established Bell Station Ranch (now the site of the City of Bell), in the Santa Fe Springs area in 1875, and of Susan Albiah Hollenbeck. His uncle, Ed Hollenbeck, who arrived in California in the 1850s, founded the First National Bank, created Los Angeles's public transportation trolley system, and developed eastern portions of Los Angeles County.

After attending Occidental College, which had been founded by his father in 1887, and graduating at the top of his class as valedictorian in 1895, Bell enrolled at San Anselmo Presbyterian College for two years (he did not return for 3rd year). In 1902 he married Minnewa Shoemaker Bell, a native of Kansas.

Bell's son, Alphonzo E. Bell Jr., later served eight terms as a California Congressman. Bell's daughter, Minnewa Bell Gray Burnside Ross, married Elliott Roosevelt, son of President Franklin D. Roosevelt, in 1951.

== Tennis achievements ==
Medal record

Men's Tennis

Representing the United States

Olympic Games
Silver medal – second place	1904 St. Louis	Doubles
Bronze medal – third place	1904 St. Louis	Singles

While in college the senior Bell was Inter-Collegiate Tennis Champion, and later Pacific Coast Tennis Champion, who at one time earned national rankings of fifth in singles and eighth in doubles. Known for his "net-rusher" style, Bell went on to win two medals in tennis at the 1904 Summer Olympics in St. Louis – a bronze in the men's singles event, and a silver in the men's doubles tournament, partnering with Robert LeRoy.

== Oil, real estate & other business ventures ==
After striking oil on their ranch at Santa Fe Springs, Bell entered the oil business with his father in the early 1920s, establishing the Bell Petroleum Co., and developing what became one of the richest oil fields in California. With the ensuing California oil boom, or "black-gold" rush, competition from various less scrupulous large oil companies was fierce—several of whom, along with William Randolph Hearst, tried to drive the more honest Bell's smaller operation out of business—a saga documented in the fictionalized account by writer Upton Sinclair in a 1927 novel Oil!, also the basis for the 2007 movie, There Will Be Blood.

Bell, known for his almost puritanical morality and honesty, used portions of his initial profits to develop upscale real estate communities in West Los Angeles, including parts of Westwood, Beverly Hills, and Pacific Palisades. He became a visionary real estate developer, anticipating the influx of Hollywood elite and other wealthy residents who would be lured by the burgeoning film industry. In 1922, building on over 600 acres (2.4 km^{2}) that he had acquired, Bell founded Bel Air Estates, an exclusive and upscale neighborhood now known as Bel-Air, enhancing the surrounding area with lush vegetation, new roads, and utilities; designed, laid out and developed the Bel-Air Country Club and the Bel Air Bay Club; The Riviera Country Club also owes its inception to Bell*. According to Claude Wayne, Bell went to see the late Frank Garbutt of the Los Angeles Athletic Club and told him that he would give the land free if Garbutt would build the club.(*Alphonzo E. Bell: a Biography by John O Pohlmann) While many such clubs thrived on sales of bootleg liquor during the years of Prohibition, Bell refused to allow the sale of illegal spirits in any of his clubs or establishments, which lost him some membership. William Randolph Hearst's longstanding vendetta with Bell had started when Bell refused to sell a homesite to Hearst for a home to house his silent-film-star mistress, Marion Davies in Bell's Bel-Air Estates development.

For themselves and their young extended family, Bell and his wife Minnewa in 1921 built a showplace 42-room house on 1,760 acres (710 ha) in portions of the areas that are now Bel Air and Pacific Palisades which they called Capo Di Monte (Italian for "Top of the Hill"). Today nothing of the house remains, except for some of the terraced gardens and rock walls, and their former horse riding stables, which now constitute a portion of the Bel-Air Hotel – with what was once the Bell stable's manure barn, now one of the favorite celebrity guest suites.

In 1926, Bell provided land in Bel Air to the proposed location of UCLA in Westwood. The deeds for the land granted to the university had strict racial provisions and dictated:

5. That neither the whole nor any part of said premises shall be sold, rented or leased to any person of Ethiopian, Chinese or Japanese descent, nor shall the same be occupied by any such person excepting as a professor or instructor of the University of California or a member of his family, excepting also as a servant or employee of the person using said premises exclusively for residential purposes.

== Philanthropy ==
Throughout his lifetime, and just prior to his death in 1947, as well as in his will, Alphozo Bell Sr. gave the larger share of his wealth to various charities – including Occidental College, University of California, Los Angeles, the L.A. Presbyterian Church, and other church groups and charitable organizations.

Today, he is honored by memorial tributes to him at – among others – Occidental College, UCLA, and the Bel-Air Country Club.
