= Alphonzo Edward Bell =

Alphonzo Edward Bell could refer to:

- Alphonzo Bell (1875–1947), American businessman
- Alphonzo Edward Bell Jr. (1914–2004), American politician and son of Alphonzo Bell
