= Alphonzo E. Bell Jr. =

American politician (1914–2004)

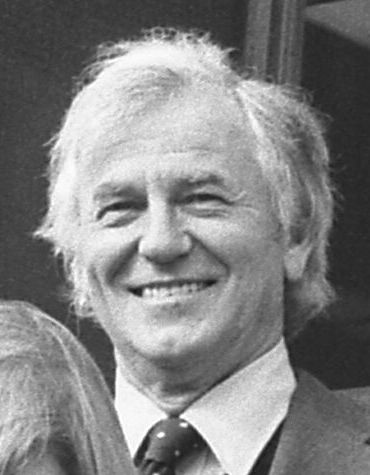
- Bell in 1974

Member of the U.S. House of Representatives from California
- In office January 3, 1961 – January 3, 1977
- Preceded by: Donald L. Jackson
- Succeeded by: Bob Dornan
- Constituency: 16th district (1961–1963); 28th district (1963–1975); 27th district (1975–1977)

Personal details
- Born: Alphonzo Edward Bell Jr. September 19, 1914 Santa Fe Springs, California, U.S.
- Died: April 25, 2004 (aged 89) Santa Monica, California, U.S.
- Party: Republican
- Spouse: Marian McCargo (m. 1970)
- Children: 10
- Parent: Alphonzo E. Bell Sr.
- Relatives: James George Bell (grandfather); Elliott Roosevelt (brother-in-law)
- Education: Occidental College
- Occupation: Elected official, businessman, cattleman, rancher

Military service
- Allegiance: United States
- Branch/service: United States Army
- Years of service: 1942–1945
- Battles/wars: World War II

Alphonzo Edward Bell Jr. (September 19, 1914 – April 25, 2004) was an American oilman and World War II veteran who served eight terms as a Republican United States representative from California. Bell represented Malibu and the influential Westside region of Los Angeles, from 1961 to 1977.

== Family background and early life ==
Al Bell, as he was known to his friends, was a scion of the pioneering ranching, oil, and real estate development family that gave its name to the Southern California communities of Bell, Bell Gardens, and Bel-Air. His father, Alphonzo, used oil company profits to develop upscale Westside communities, including parts of Westwood, Beverly Hills, Pacific Palisades, and Bel-Air.

The younger Bell grew up on his father's estate and ranch just north of Los Angeles, a vast and sprawling acreage encompassing the areas that are now known as Bel Air and Pacific Palisades. Numbering among his closest childhood friends and frequent horseback riding companions was Will Rogers Jr., whose famous father owned a large ranch just north of that of the Bell family.

Bell began his education at the Webb School of California in the early 1930s. He went on to earn a degree in political science from Occidental College in 1938, and after serving in the Army Air Force during World War II (from 1942 to 1945), he joined the family oil business and served as company president from 1947 to 1959. Also a rancher and cattleman, Bell claimed in his autobiography to have sold the oil company in 1975.

== Political career and public service ==
=== California Republican Party ===
Bell first entered politics in the mid-1950s, holding several Republican Party positions.

He served as chairman of the Republican Central Committee of Los Angeles County, chairman of the Republican State Central Committee of California, and as a member of the Republican National Committee.

Although Bell's political idol, and his original inspiration to enter public service, had been President Franklin Roosevelt, Bell said he switched from the Young Democrats while a college student to later registering as a Republican, and actively supported General Dwight D. Eisenhower for president in 1952. Bell served as chairman of the Republican State Central Committee of California from 1956 to 1959, and as a member of the Republican National Committee from 1956 to 1959.

=== United States Congress ===
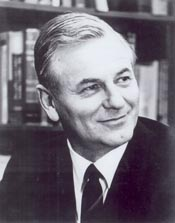
Bell as a congressman

In 1960, Bell was elected as a Republican to the Eighty-seventh Congress, and won re-election to the seven succeeding Congresses, serving from January 3, 1961 – January 3, 1977.

While in Congress, Bell represented a vast Congressional District — the 28th and, after re-districting, the 27th — running along the California coast from Malibu to the Palos Verdes Peninsula and encompassing all or part of Santa Monica, Pacific Palisades, Brentwood, Bel-Air and West L.A. Then considered a Republican stronghold, the district nevertheless had only 40% to 49% GOP voter registration, making bi-partisan support for a candidate for office essential.

In Congress, Bell became known as tending toward conservative positions on foreign policy and defense — he backed the Vietnam War through three presidential administrations — but often took more moderate to liberal positions on domestic issues, including open housing laws and other civil rights legislation, as well as on environmental and preservation issues, and on education policy and reform.

Some called Congressman Al Bell a political conservative, others a moderate. A Ralph Nader study on Bell's voting record in 1972 said: "It's hard to say exactly what he is. He leans in many areas, especially those concerning economic regulation, toward the conservatives. When it comes to the people issues, especially those concerning the downtrodden in American society, Bell is a liberal."

The congressman once described himself as "middle-ground" and said he voted according to principle and on an issue's merits, rather than political expediency. "A moderate", he told a Los Angeles Times columnist in 1970, "has to study harder. The extremist at either end doesn't have to do most of the work or most of the thinking – he knows what he's for and against beforehand. A moderate has to decide each question on its own merits."

As a ranking member of the House Committee on Science and Astronautics, and on the Committee on Education and Labor, he earned bi-partisan approval for his work on such diverse bills as the Older Americans Act, the Elementary and Secondary Education Act, the Housing and Urban Development Act of 1968, as well as laws improving labor standards, workers' safety, veterans' benefits and environmental protection and ecosystem and wildlife preservation programs. Bell also supported the Family Assistance Plan, the Comprehensive Child Development Act of 1971 and the Equal Rights Amendment.

Bell also supported every major piece of Civil Rights legislation considered in the Congress during his tenure, often working at odds with his own party, which frequently opposed these bills, and became a tireless advocate early on for the legislation which eventually became the Civil Rights Act of 1964. As the bill needed substantial bi-partisan support from Republicans to gain approval to counter-act the opposition of Democrats, Bell contributed significantly to passage of the Civil Rights Act in the House by helping to round up the necessary Republican votes. In this effort, he worked closely with and became close personal friends with Clarence Mitchell Jr., of the NAACP. He and Mitchell walked side by side during the 1963 March on Washington for Jobs and Freedom with Martin Luther King Jr., and both were honored by being seated behind the podium, in front of the Lincoln Memorial, as King delivered his famous "I Have a Dream" speech.

Writing later about passage of the historic 1964 legislation, Bell said: "I am proud to have supported the Civil Rights Act from the first. It was a bill that embraced the goal of equal opportunity for all people. A coalition of law-makers forged a consensus on the meaning of justice and equality in American life. This was a consensus based on the compelling principle of non-discrimination for all individuals, no matter what their race, religion ethnicity, or sex."

=== Popularity at home in California ===
Wealthy, easy-going, friendly, handsome, and mild-mannered, Bell had no trouble appealing to voters in both parties, and won his first primary race for Congress by a margin of 50% to 12% over his opponent. He consistently enjoyed a wide spectrum of diverse political endorsements in elections, having been, for example, endorsed in his initial run for Congress by both former First Lady Eleanor Roosevelt, and by future California Governor and President Ronald Reagan, who, even as recently as 1960, was a nominal Democrat, and served as chairman of a committee he organized as "Democrats for Al Bell". Late in his political career, during his run for the U.S. Senate in 1976, Bell was endorsed by both Los Angeles Mayor Tom Bradley, and by well-known actor/director John Wayne.

Congressman Bell was never able, however, to transfer his popularity and long record of public service to winning higher office. He had attempted to do so on two occasions — running for the U.S. Senate seat held by Democrat John V. Tunney of California in 1976, and in an earlier effort in 1969 to unseat incumbent Los Angeles Mayor Sam Yorty. Yorty retained his office in 1969, but was defeated—due in part to Bell's support for his opponent—in the next mayoral election by Tom Bradley; and Tunney was eventually unseated by S.I. Hayakawa in 1976, who had defeated Bell in the Republican primary. In order to run in the Senate primary, Bell had not sought reelection to the House in 1976.

The mayoral race against Yorty had illustrated Bell's independence and determination to do what he believed in, even though it could harm him politically. After losing the primary, Bell actively campaigned for Yorty's general election opponent, Tom Bradley, and though of opposing political parties, they became lifelong friends, with Bradley later supporting Bell in his Congressional races and in his Senate effort. Bell had long opposed Yorty, claiming he was "temperamentally unsuited" to govern Los Angeles and that his constant bickering with Washington had prevented the city from getting federal funds. Bell also despised Yorty's racial-based campaign against Bradley, along with earlier smear tactics against other opponents, which he said filled him with revulsion. But Bell's support of Bradley in the non-partisan race so irked some conservative Republican constituents, such as fellow oilman and Yorty backer Henry Salvatori, that Republican attorney John LaFollette was put on the primary ballot to run for Bell's Congressional seat in 1970. Bell prevailed, however, and remained in Congress for three more terms, until his retirement in 1976.

In a tribute to retired Congressman Bell in 1998, former President George H. W. Bush said of Bell's career of public service: "He served and he served with honor. For sixteen years he served in Congress, always voting his conscience, but always serving the people of his district, never forgetting who sent him to Washington. We need more Al Bells, with his flawless service in the U.S. Congress. He showed his state and nation a lot of class."

== Personal life and family ==
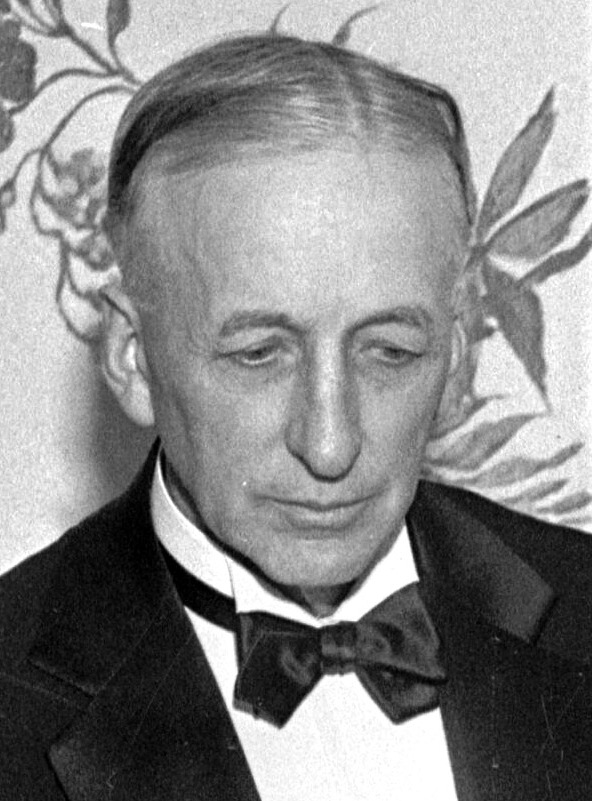
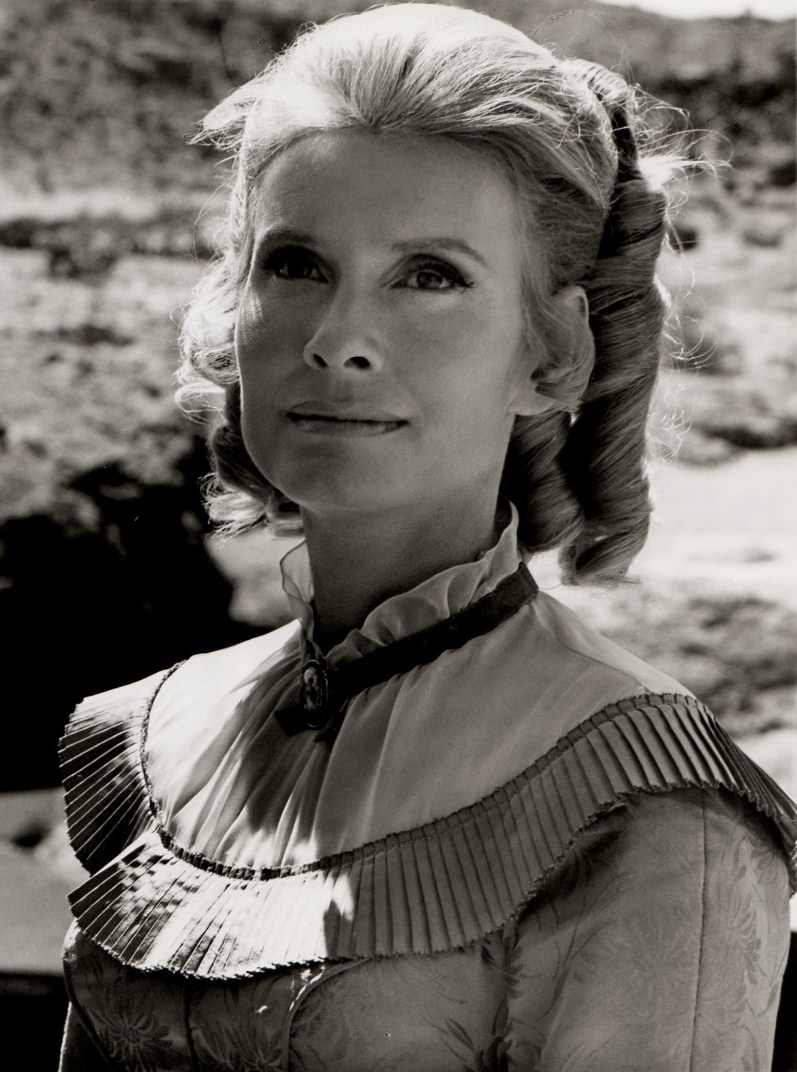
Bell Jr.'s father Alphonzo Bell and Bell Jr.'s wife Marian McCargo Bell

In 1940, Bell married Elizabeth Jane Helms, daughter of Paul Hoy Helms, American executive in the baking industry, and sports philanthropist. He founded the Helms Bakery in 1931 at Venice and Washington in Los Angeles, and the Helms Athletic Foundation with Bill Schroeder in 1936. Bell and Helms were later divorced.

In 1970, Bell married television/movie actress, and former tennis champion and Wightman Cup winner, Marian McCargo, whom he described in his autobiography as the love of his life. They had met when she was starring in the film, The Undefeated, with his long-time close friend, actor John Wayne.

Once divorced and twice widowed, Bell had one daughter, Fonza, and nine sons: Stephen, Matthew, Phonzo, Robert, and Tony Bell; and Rick, Graham, Harry, and Billy Moses. His youngest son, Tony Bell, serves as the Assistant Chief Deputy and spokesman for Los Angeles County Supervisor Mike Antonovich.

== Death ==
Bell died of complications of pneumonia in 2004, just eighteen days after the death of his wife Marian from pancreatic cancer.

== See also ==
- Alphonzo Bell, Bell's father
- James George Bell, Bell's grandfather
- Marian McCargo Bell, Bell's spouse
- William R. Moses, Bell's stepson
- Kathy Coleman, Bell's daughter-in-law; Land of the Lost cast member, television actor

== Electoral history ==
1960 United States House of Representatives elections in California
Party	Candidate	Votes	%
Republican	Alphonzo E. Bell Jr.	83,601	55.4
Democratic	Jerry Pacht	67,318	44.6
Total votes		150,919	100.0
Turnout			
Republican hold			

1962 United States House of Representatives elections in California
Party	Candidate	Votes	%
Republican	Alphonzo E. Bell, Jr. (Incumbent)	162,233	64.0
Democratic	Jerry Pacht	91,305	36.0
Total votes		253,538	100.0
Republican hold			

1964 United States House of Representatives elections in California]
Party	Candidate	Votes	%
Republican	Alphonzo E. Bell, Jr. (Incumbent)	205,473	65.6
Democratic	Gerald A. Gottlieb	107,852	34.4
Total votes		313,325	100.0
Republican hold			

1966 United States House of Representatives elections in California
Party	Candidate	Votes	%
Republican	Alphonzo E. Bell, Jr. (Incumbent)	211,404	72.3
Democratic	Lawrence "Lorry" Sherman	81,007	27.7
Total votes		292,411	100.0
Republican hold			

1968 United States House of Representatives elections in California
Party	Candidate	Votes	%
Republican	Alphonzo E. Bell, Jr. (Incumbent)	168,208	71.2
Democratic	John McKee Pratt	63,414	26.9
Peace and Freedom	Sherman Pearl	4,503	1.9
Total votes		236,125	100.0
Republican hold			

1970 United States House of Representatives elections in California
Party	Candidate	Votes	%
Republican	Alphonzo E. Bell, Jr. (Incumbent)	154,691	69.3
Democratic	Don McLaughlin	57,882	25.9
American Independent	Derek A. Gordon	5,759	2.6
Peace and Freedom	Jane E. Gordon	4,971	2.2
Total votes		223,303	100.0
Republican hold			

1972 United States House of Representatives elections in California
Party	Candidate	Votes	%
Republican	Alphonzo E. Bell, Jr. (Incumbent)	142,102	60.7
Democratic	Michael Shapiro	87,783	37.5
Peace and Freedom	Jack Hampton	4,184	1.8
Total votes		234,069	100.0
Republican hold			

1974 United States House of Representatives elections in California
Party	Candidate	Votes	%
Republican	Alphonzo E. Bell Jr. (Incumbent)	99,645	63.9
Democratic	John Dalessio	50,919	32.5
Peace and Freedom	Jerry Rubin	5,547	3.6
Total votes		156,111	100.0
Republican hold			

1976 Republican U.S. Senate primary, California
Party	Candidate	Votes	%
Republican	S. I. Hayakawa	886,743	38.25%
Republican	Robert H. Finch	614,240	26.49%
Republican	Alphonzo E. Bell Jr.	532,969	22.99%
Republican	John L. Harmer	197,252	8.51%
Republican	Walter Hollywood	28,163	1.22%
Republican	Clyde F. Tracy	17,784	0.77%
Republican	James A. Ware	14,990	0.65%
Republican	Henry Hill	10,290	0.44%
Republican	Michael A. Hirt	9,941	0.43%
Republican	Hannibal C. Burchette V	6,222	0.27%
Total votes		2,318,594	100.00%

Party political offices
Preceded by Thomas W. Caldecott	Chair of the California Republican Party; 1956–1958	Succeeded by George W. Milias
U.S. House of Representatives
Preceded by Donald L. Jackson	Member of the U.S. House of Representatives from California's 16th congressional district 1961–1963	Succeeded by B. F. Sisk
Preceded by James B. Utt	Member of the U.S. House of Representatives from California's 28th congressional district 1963–1975	Succeeded by Yvonne Brathwaite Burke
Preceded by Barry Goldwater Jr.	Member of the U.S. House of Representatives from California's 27th congressional district 1975–1977	Succeeded by Bob Dornan
