= James George Bell =

American settler and businessman (1831–1911)

- Born: December 14, 1831; Bowling Green, Kentucky, U.S.
- Died: November 23, 1911 (aged 79)
- Spouses: Dorothea A. Reasons (m. 1856; died 1864) Susan Abia Hollenbeck (m. 1866)
- Children: George, Mary, Otis F. (first wife), Alphonzo Bell (second wife)
- Relatives: Alphonzo Bell Jr. (grandson); Elliott Roosevelt (grandson-in-law); Marian McCargo (granddaughter-in-law)

James George Bell (December 14, 1831 – November 23, 1911) was an American settler and businessman who is considered a founder of the city of Bell, California.

== Biography ==
Bell was born in Bowling Green, Kentucky, and later moved to Missouri. His friend J. Edward Hollenbeck persuaded Bell to join him in California. James Bell arrived in San Francisco, California, in 1875, then traveled down the coast to Los Angeles.

In 1875, Bell and his extended family purchased about 360 acres (1.5 km^{2}) of the California property, near modern Los Angeles. The area was originally part of the Spanish land grant Rancho San Antonio. Between 1870 and 1890, the grant was broken into smaller land holdings and acquired by newly arriving settlers.

Bell engaged in cattle raising and dry farming, developed water wells, and rented land to vegetable farmers. The Bell family initially lived at the Hollenbeck's "Town House" at Fourth and Breed streets in what is now Boyle Heights until moving to a "ranch" in 1876. The family's "Bell House" was built in an early Victorian architectural style. Bell helped the area develop into a small farming and cattle raising community. Originally known as Obed, the California town's name was changed in 1898 to Bell to honor the pioneer founder.

He served as Bell's first postmaster and rose through the ritual ranks of the Masonic Lodge. Late in life, Bell would subdivide his land into tracts of 5-acre (20,000 m^{2}) farms and move to Santa Fe Springs to live with his son Alphonzo Sr. He was one of the founders of Occidental College.

== Family life ==
Bell married Dorothea ("Dolly") A. Reasons on July 17, 1856, in Missouri and they had children George, Mary, and Otis F. Bell Sr. Dolly Bell died on November 27, 1864. In June 1866, Bell married Susan Abia Hollenbeck, a sister of his friend J. Edward Hollenbeck. James Bell had left his family in Missouri when he headed west in 1875. Six-months pregnant, Susan Bell and her four-year-old daughter Maude got on a box car to catch up with James in California. The fifth child, Alphonzo Sr., was born in 1875.

James George Bell's son, Alphonzo Bell Sr., was an oil millionaire, real estate developer and champion tennis player. He established the Bell Petroleum Oil Company, and used oil revenues to develop Bel-Air Estates. His grandson, Alphonzo E. Bell Jr. was a popular 20th Century California Congressman. The Bell family also gave their name to Bell Gardens.

== Legacy ==
- Bell, California, and Bell Gardens, California, are named for him.
