= John Hollenbeck =

John Hollenbeck may refer to:

- John Hollenbeck (musician) (born 1968), jazz drummer and composer
- John Edward Hollenbeck (1829–1885), American businessman in Nicaragua and Los Angeles
