= Hispanic American Veterans Memorial =

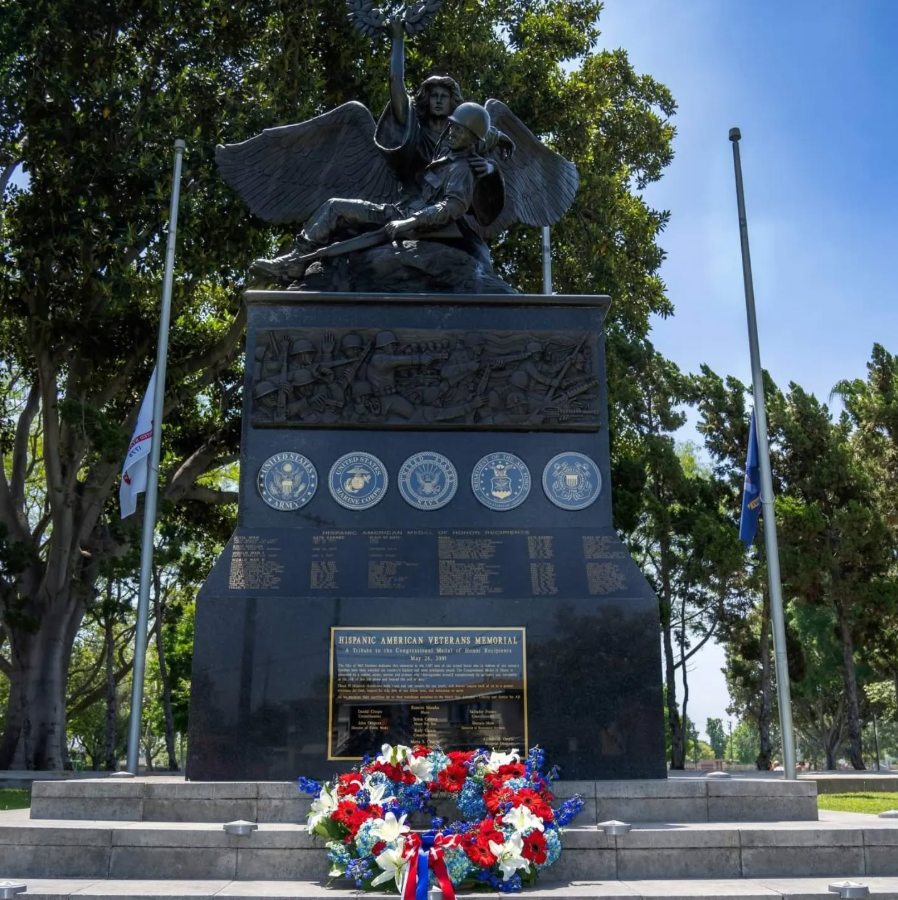
- Interactive map of Hispanic American; Veterans Memorial
- Location: Bell Gardens, California
- Coordinates: 33°58′08″N 118°08′47″W
- Material: Bronze
- Dedicated to: Hispanic American veterans

The Hispanic American Veterans Memorial is a memorial dedicated to Hispanic recipients of the Congressional Medal of Honor and to Hispanic American veterans in general, located at Veterans Park in Bell Gardens, California.

== History ==
The memorial was designed by artist Alfredo Osorio. It was dedicated on May 26, 2001, at a ceremony with 6 living Medal of Honor recipients. The monument was proposed by María Chacón, Bell Gardens city manager and former mayor, as a memorial to honor the Hispanic recipients of the Congressional Medal of Honor.
