= Pat North Ommert =

Trick riders

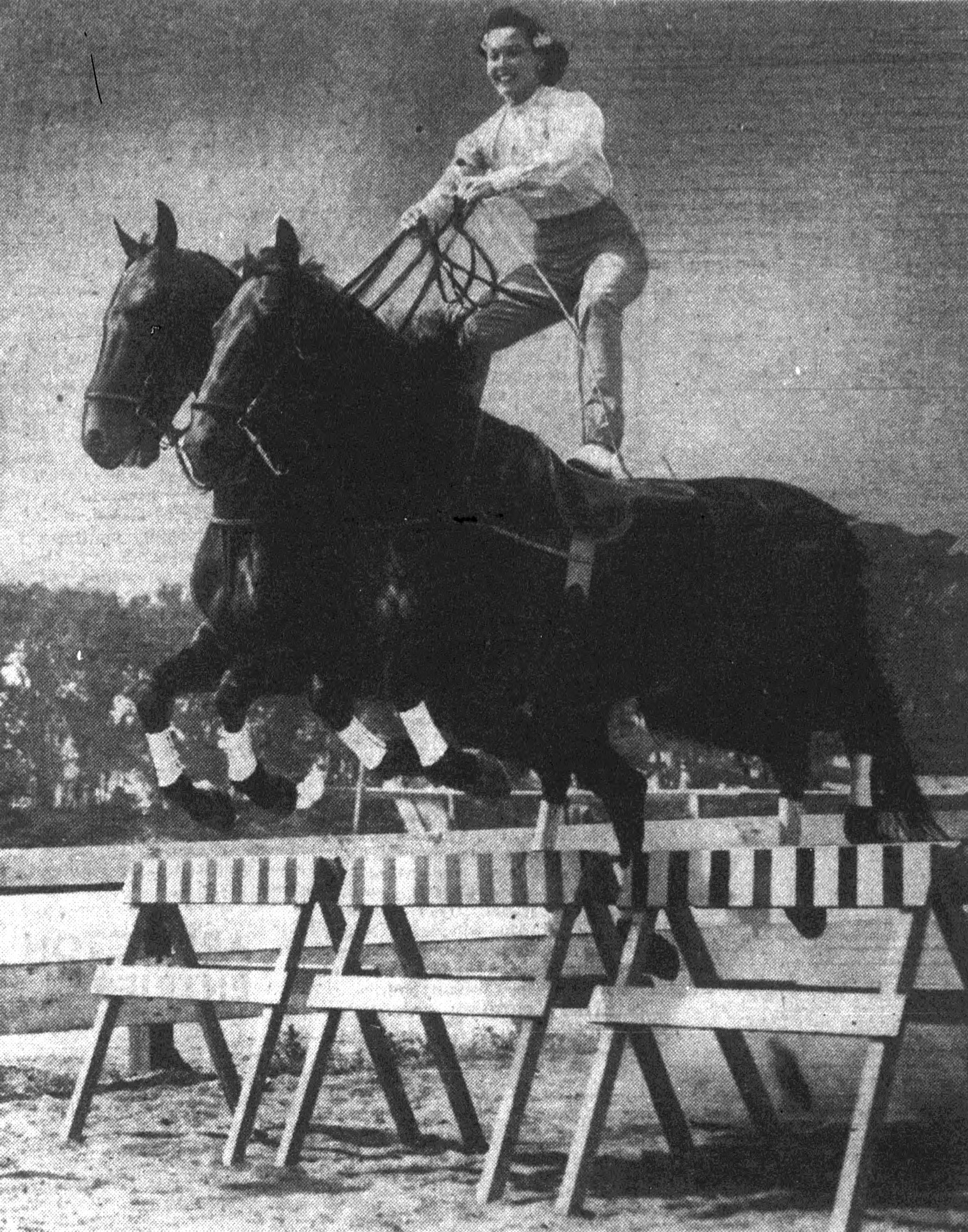
- North Ommert, circa 1951
- Born: Pat North; October 12, 1929 (age 96); Bell, California, U.S.
- Occupations: stuntwoman, trick rider
- Spouse(s): Willard D. Ommert (1947-his death 2004)

Pat North Ommert (born October 12, 1929), in Bell, California, is a skilled rodeo trick rider. She performed as a stunt double in numerous films and toured the world with the Wild West shows through the 1940s and 60s.

== Career ==
Besides being a trick rider, Ommert also was a Roman rider and jumper, and jockey. She toured with many Wild West shows. In 1969 Ommert was a Rancho California Horseman's Association founding leader.

=== Retirement ===
Ommert and her husband opened the Los Caballos Farm in California. The farm is a center for rehabilitating horses, the first of its kind in the state. Ommert has also dedicated valuable time to keeping California's horse trails preserved.

In December 2020, in Burbank, California, Ommert rode in the Rose Parade at the age of 90. On December 29 at EquestFest, she appeared at the Equidome in Burbank's Los Angeles Equestrian Center. The event enables visitors to get close to the 100s of riders and horses participating in the Rose Parade. Then, on New Year's Day, she made the journey down Pasadena, California's, Colorado Boulevard in the 131st Tournament of Roses Parade in which she rode a horse-drawn wagon, a group of the Horsewomen of Temecula.

== Awards ==
- 2000 California Professional Horsemen's Association Lifetime Achievement Award
- 2016 Inducted into the National Cowgirl Museum and Hall of Fame in Fort Worth, Texas.
- 2020 Tad Lucas Award from the National Cowboy and Western Heritage Museum

== Performances ==
- 1954 picture, A Star is Born stunt double.
- Five years after her A Star is Born job, she jumped fences while standing on the backs on two horses during the Flintridge Riding Club's Amateur Horse Show in La Canada
- Performed at the Madison Square Garden 56 times
- Performed at the Boston Garden.
- Performed at the Powder Puff Derbies at the Agua Caliente Racetrack in Tijuana, Baja California, Mexico
- Performed in the Los Angeles Sheriff's Rodeo Roman races
- Performed at Bobby Estes' Wild West Show in Mexico City

== Personal life ==
Pat North Ommert was born Pat North on October 12, 1929, in Bell, California, and is the second daughter of Bob and Vera North. Her mother was a notable trick rider, who had performed in the Hawaiian Islands with the E.K. Fernandez Wild West Show.

Ommert first began riding at 3 years old with her sister. At age 5, she rode solo with her mother supervising, also a trick rider. As a teenager, she performed in an all-girl rodeo billed as "Patsy North and her Trick Horse Rex". She never stopped after that. Ommert began performing at age 16. She married veterinarian Willard D. Ommert (died 2004) in 1947. Ommert formerly lived in Burbank, but now resides in Temecula, California.
