= Cynthia Maughan =

American visual artist (1949–2019)

Cynthia Maughan (1949 – June 13, 2019) was an American visual artist who is renowned for her early video art and films. Maughan lived and worked in Los Angeles, California.

== Early life ==
Cynthia Maughan was born in Bell, California in 1949. She grew up in Norwalk, California. She attained a Masters in Fine Arts from California State University in Long Beach, California in 1974.

== Career ==
Between 1973 and 1980, Maughan created nearly three hundred short, self-directed performances for the camera in Pasadena, California. These early video works are characterized by their humor and low-fi aesthetic. These videos were often titled descriptively, such as "Tell Three Cats About Jail" (1977–1978) and "Two Sticks Mourning At Another Stick's Funeral" (1973–1974). Maughan has since cited the artist William Wegman, who was a teacher at California State University as an influence on her decision to try film.

In the 1980s the artist moved into the punk music scene. She was a member of several bands, such as Auto De Fe, the Nihils, Primitive State and The Shrews.

In 2008, Maughan was included in the exhibition, California Video, at the Getty Center.

Maughan died on June 13, 2019.

=== Select films ===
- Coffin from Toothpicks (1975).
- Browning Automatic (1978).
- I Tell Three Cats about Jail (1977–1978).
- Taking Medicine with Gloves On (1975).
- Two Sticks Mourning at Another Stick's Funeral (1973–1974).
