= Neil Ferris =

American football player (1927–1996)

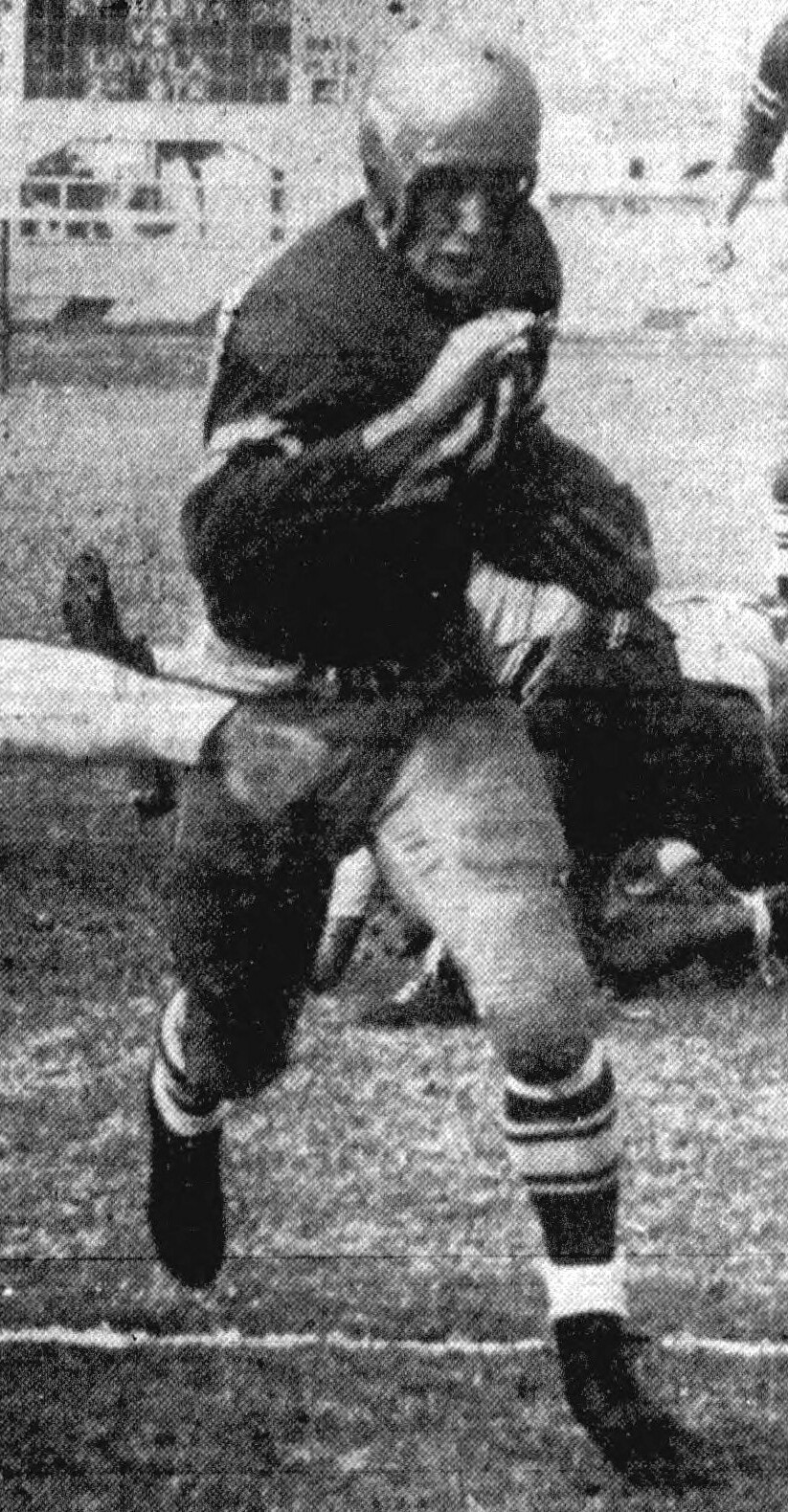
- Ferris in 1950

No. 12, 27, 80
- Positions: Defensive back, halfback

Personal information
- Born: October 31, 1927; Bell, California, U.S.
- Died: January 30, 1996 (aged 68); Lake Havasu City, Arizona, U.S.
- Listed height: 5 ft 11 in (1.80 m)
- Listed weight: 181 lb (82 kg)

Career information
- High school: Bell (CA)
- College: Loyola Marymount

Career history
- Washington Redskins (1951–1952); Philadelphia Eagles (1952); Los Angeles Rams (1953)

Career statistics
- Games played: 29
- Stats at Pro Football Reference

Neil George Ferris (October 31, 1927 – January 30, 1996) was an American football defensive back and halfback in the National Football League.

A graduate of Loyola Marymount University, Ferris was inducted into their Hall of Fame in 1991. Ferris played for three NFL teams, the Washington Redskins in 1951–1952, the Philadelphia Eagles in 1952, and also the Los Angeles Rams, in 1953.
