= Bell, California =

City in California, United States

- City
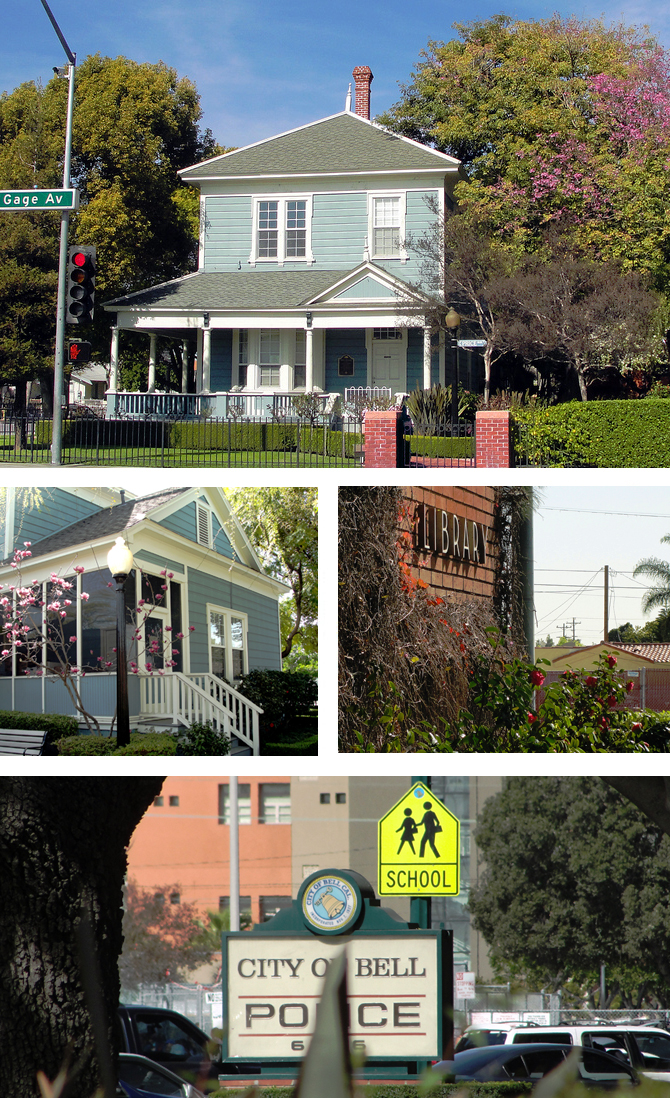
- Images, from top and left to right: James George Bell House, Bell Public Library, City of Bell Police sign

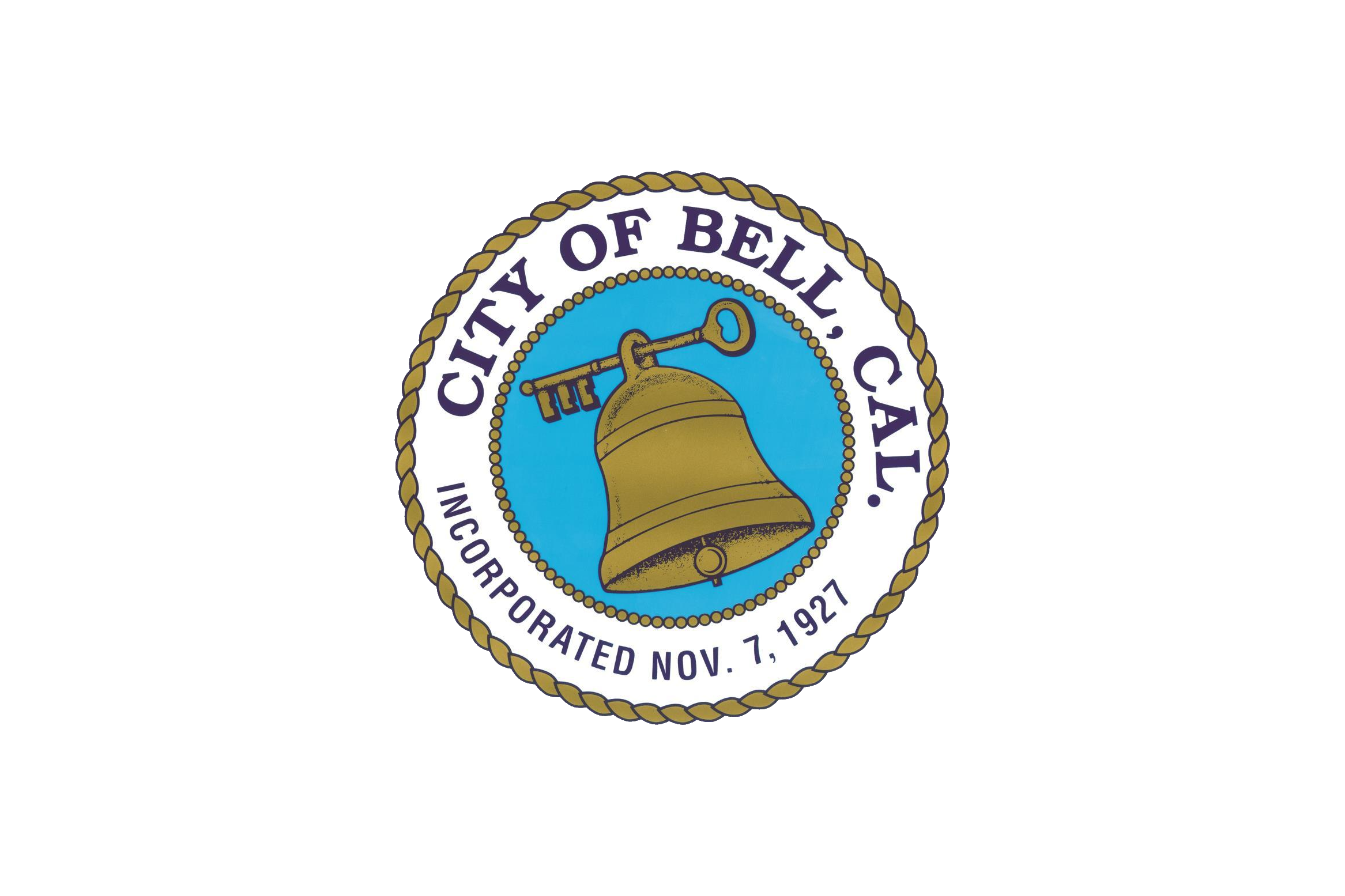
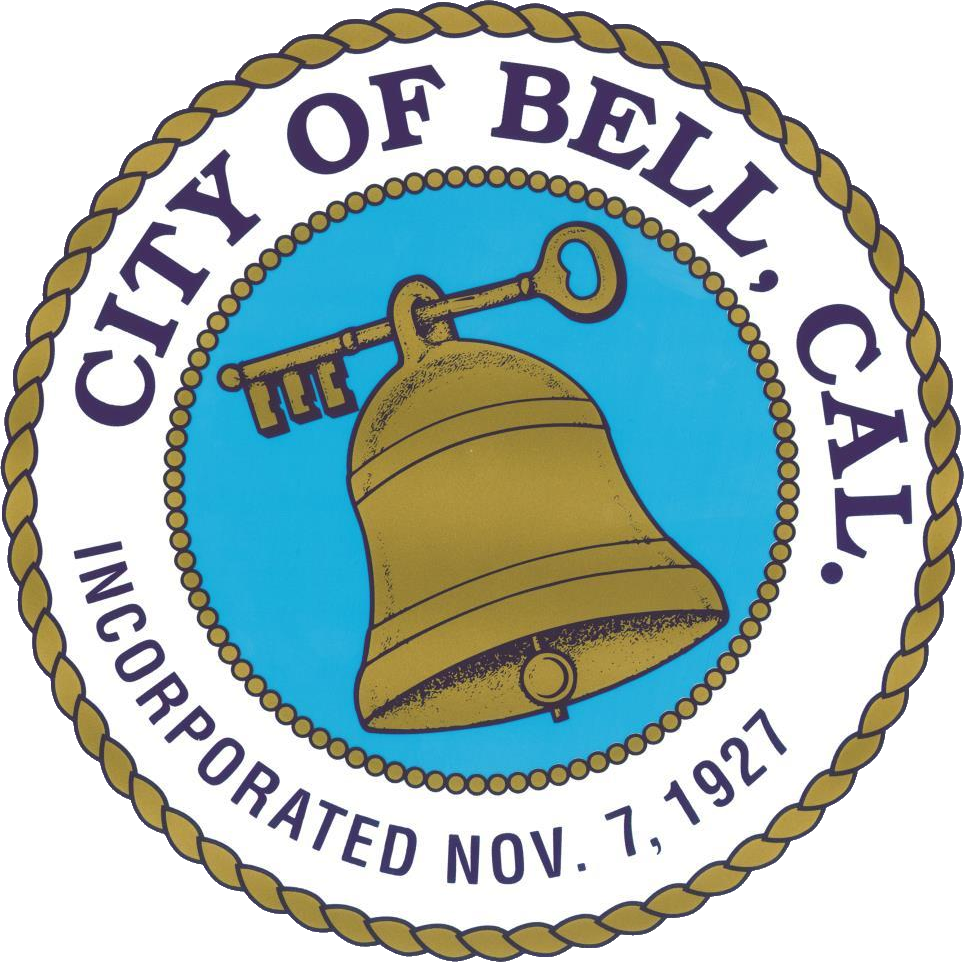
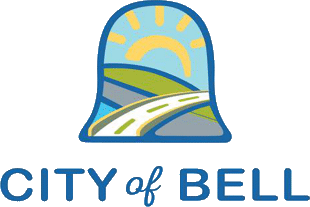
- Flag Seal Logo
- Interactive map of Bell, California
- Location in California Bell (California) Bell (the United States)
- Coordinates: 33°59′N 118°11′W
- Country: United States
- State: California
- County: Los Angeles
- Incorporated: November 7, 1927
- Named for: The family of James George Bell

Government
  - Mayor: Ali Saleh
  - Vice Mayor: Monica Arroyo
  - City Council: Ana Maria Quintana; Alicia Romero; Francis Flores
  - City Manager: Michael L. Antwine II

Area
  - Total: 2.63 sq mi (6.80 km^{2})
  - Land: 2.51 sq mi (6.50 km^{2})
  - Water: 0.12 sq mi (0.31 km^{2}) 4.53%
- Elevation: 141 ft (43 m)

Population (2020)
  - Total: 33,559
  - Density: 13,380.5/sq mi (5,166.23/km^{2})
- Time zone: UTC-8 (PST)
  - Summer (DST): UTC-7 (PDT)
- ZIP Code: 90201, 90202, 90270
- Area code: 323
- FIPS code: 06-04870
- GNIS feature IDs: 1660322, 2409816
- Website: cityofbell.gov

Bell is an incorporated city in Los Angeles County, California, United States. Located near the center of the former San Antonio Township (abolished after 1960), its population was 33,559 at the 2020 census, down from 35,477 at the 2010 census. Bell is located on the west bank of the Los Angeles River and is a suburb of the city of Los Angeles. At 2.5 square miles (6.5 km^{2}), Bell is the thirteenth-smallest city in the United States with a population of at least 25,000.

In 2007, the U.S. Census Bureau ranked Bell's land area at 1245 out of 1257 cities (defined as incorporated areas) and two unincorporated areas that had a population of at least 25,000 in year 2000. Ten cities in the list of 1267 cities had no land area data (e.g., Goleta, California).

City residents voted to become a charter city in a special municipal election on November 29, 2005. Fewer than 400 voters turned out for that special election. Being a charter city meant that city officials were exempt from state salary caps. A scandal ensued, in which several city officials were indicted for fraud, found guilty on numerous charges and sentenced to up to 12 years in prison, after giving themselves extraordinarily high salaries.

== History ==
=== Early history ===
The Gabrieliño Indians migrated to the place now called Bell in 500 B.C. Spaniards have been living in this area of California since the mid-18th century. Among the early Spanish settlers was one of California's first families, the Lugos.

While stationed at Mission San Antonio de Padua near Salinas, California, Francisco Lugo's first California son, Antonio María Lugo was born in 1775, who would become Don Antonio María Lugo, Spanish aristocrat and soldier, who settled on 30,000 acres of land that encompasses the present-day City of Bell. In 1810, the king of Spain formally granted the land to Lugo as a reward for his military service and the acreage became known as Rancho San Antonio.

The grant was confirmed by the Mexican governor in 1838. By 1865, the Lugo family's fortune had dwindled and most of the Rancho was sold for less than a dollar per acre. The Lugo family did manage to retain its home, built about 1810, which is the now oldest house in Los Angeles County. The original adobe house was on Gage Avenue.

Between 1870 and 1890, settlers arrived to the area and among those was the city's founder. In 1876, the pioneer residents for whom the city is named, James George Bell and his wife Susan Abia Hollenbeck Bell, and their two children, Maude Elizabeth and Alphonzo Sr. moved from Los Angeles where they lived for a short period with Susan's brother, John Hollenbeck, in their Victorian style home – the Bell House, now a historic landmark located at 4401 East Gage Avenue. On April 6, 2000, the Bell House was dedicated as a California State Historical Resource.

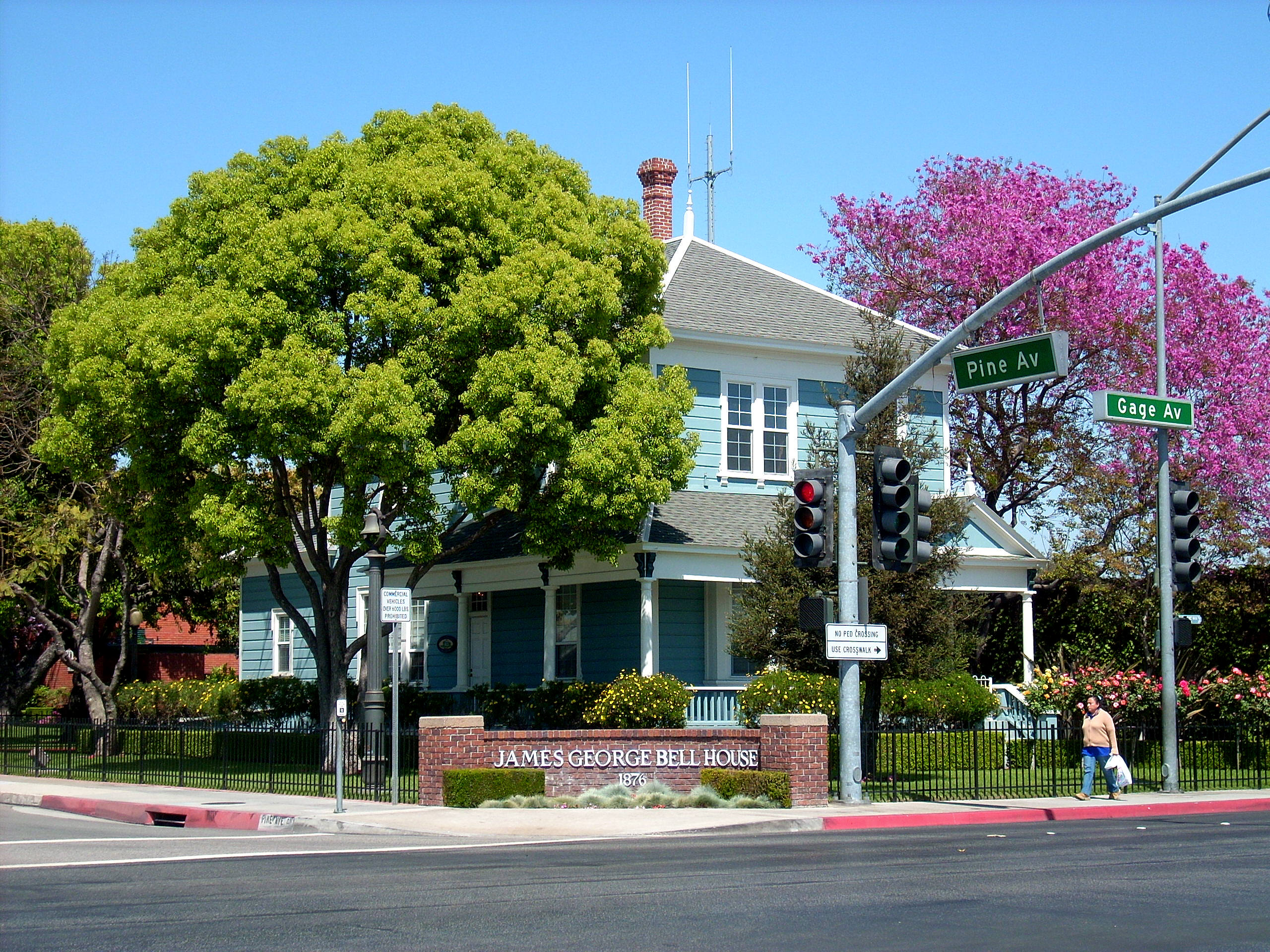
James George Bell House

They acquired about 360 acres (145.7 ha) of land and in the next decade, helped in its development as a small farming and cattle raising community. The Bell Family lived at the Hollenbeck's "Town House" on 4th and Breed Street until they moved into the "ranch" Bell House in 1876. The Bell House was an early Victorian style farm house. In 1898, the town's name was changed from Rancho San Antonio to Bell, in honor of its pioneer founders.

Between 1920 and 1935, an explosive growth in population occurred in the Bell area. Old and new residents built new businesses, established schools, and founded community organizations, such as the Bell Chamber of Commerce and the Woman's Club. An area-wide sanitation district was formed in 1923 to provide sewer facilities.

In 1924, George O. Wheeler founded the Industrial Post, the local newspaper. By the early 1960s, the Bell Industrial Post had become the Bell-Maywood-Cudahy Industrial Post. It was later renamed the Community News, and became part of the Los Cerritos Community Newspaper Group. In 1998 it was sold again. The Community News disappeared not long after, facilitating a chain of corrupt practiced that ultimately led to criminal convictions for city administrator Robert Rizzo, who had been hired around 1998, and six other Bell city officials.

In 1925, the Alcazar Theater to show "talking pictures", was opened. It has since been demolished.

In 1925, Bell High School was opened.

=== Cityhood ===
Bell was incorporated as a city in 1927. Since its incorporation, the city of Bell has acquired land for public parks and the recreational program. The city also has constructed an adequate sewer system, widened all major streets, built a city hall, and provided fire department buildings, with the cooperation of the city of Maywood and the County of Los Angeles, the city of Bell constructed an indoor public swimming pool at Bell High School.

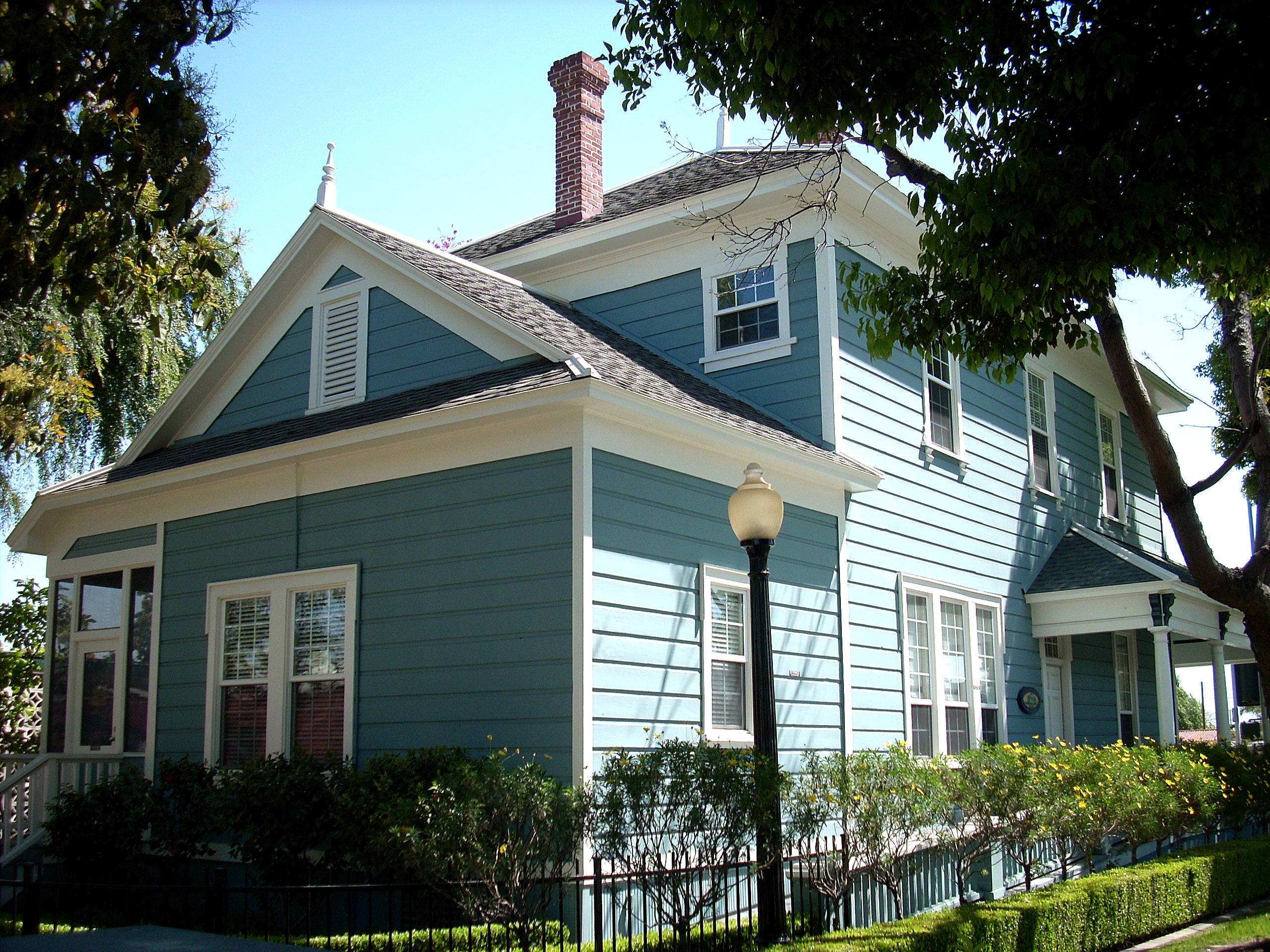
James George Bell House

The city's Chamber of Commerce is located at the historic James George Bell House, which serves as a meeting place and in addition, a museum showcasing artifacts from the city's founding family and period furniture. The house is open to the general public with free admission.

In March 2007, the city of Bell held its first contested election for city council in almost a decade. The next election for City Council was held in March 2011, and included the recall of all the city council members save one, who was not re-elected.

=== Oscar controversy ===
In March 2000, it was reported that a shipment of 55 Oscar statuettes was stolen from a trucking company loading dock in Bell. In addition to the Los Angeles and Bell police departments, FBI art theft experts investigated. It was the second Oscar mishap within a short period, as earlier that month 4,000 Oscar ballots were misrouted. Coincidentally, the missing Oscar ballots were found by the post office in a Bell processing center. AMPAS Executive Director Bruce Davis was quoted as jokingly warning Billy Crystal, host of that year's Oscar ceremony, not to go near Bell because it "seems to be a Bermuda Triangle for Oscar things".

=== 2010 city official corruption scandal ===
In July 2010, when two Los Angeles Times reporters, Jeff Gottlieb and Ruben Vives, were investigating possible malfeasance in the neighboring city of Maywood, it was revealed that Bell city officials were receiving unusually large salaries, perhaps the highest in the United States. The salaries came into the public eye after the newspaper's investigation, based on California Public Records Act requests, showed that the city payroll was swollen with six- to seven-figure salaries. Robert Rizzo, the City manager, received $787,637 a year, almost double the salary of the President of the United States. Including benefits, he had received $1.5 million in the last year. Rizzo's assistant, Angela Spaccia, was earning $376,288 a year, more than the top administrator for Los Angeles County. The police chief, Randy Adams, was paid $457,000, 33% more than Los Angeles Police Chief Charlie Beck. All three resigned following news reports and public outcry. All but one of the members of the city council were receiving $100,000 for their part-time work, salaries which were authorized by a sparsely attended special election, giving the city "Charter" status. By comparison, council members in cities similar to Bell in size make an average of $4,800 a year, prosecutors have noted.

In September 2010, the California Attorney General's office filed a lawsuit against eight former and current City of Bell employees, requesting the return of what the suit calls "excessive salaries" as well a reduction in pension benefits accrued as a result of those higher salaries. Allegations about irregularities in the 2009 election also were examined by the FBI and California Secretary of State office. The city's high property taxes are also being investigated.

On September 21, 2010, former city manager Robert Rizzo, Mayor Oscar Hernandez, former assistant city manager Angela Spaccia and council members George Mirabal, Teresa Jacobo, Luis Artiga, George Cole and Victor Bello were arrested and charged with misappropriation of public funds. The mayor and council members all either resigned or were recalled. Of the eight, only Luis Artiga was found not guilty. The revelations about the salary amounts paid to city officials in Bell led media inquires into salaries paid in other cities. After a review, the L.A. Times found frequent failures in audits of public agencies in other municipalities in California.

== Geography ==
According to the United States Census Bureau, the city has a total area of 2.6 square miles (6.7 km^{2}), of which 2.5 square miles (6.5 km^{2}) is land and 0.1 square miles (0.26 km^{2}) is water.

=== Surrounding areas ===
Maywood / Commerce
Huntington Park / Vernon Commerce
Huntington Park Bell Gardens
South Gate Bell Gardens
Cudahy

== Demographics ==
Historical population
Census	Pop.	Note	%±
1930	7,884		—
1940	11,264		42.9%
1950	15,430		37.0%
1960	19,450		26.1%
1970	21,836		12.3%
1980	25,450		16.6%
1990	34,365		35.0%
2000	36,664		6.7%
2010	35,477		−3.2%
2020	33,559		−5.4%
U.S. Decennial Census; 1860–1870 1880-1890; 1900 1910 1920; 1930 1940 1950; 1960 1970 1980; 1990 2000 2010; 2020

Bell first appeared as a city in the 1930 U.S. Census as part of the now defunct San Antonio Township (pop. 107,894 in 1930).

=== Racial and ethnic composition ===
Bell city, California – Racial and ethnic composition Note: the US Census treats Hispanic/Latino as an ethnic category. This table excludes Latinos from the racial categories and assigns them to a separate category. Hispanics/Latinos may be of any race.
Race / Ethnicity (NH = Non-Hispanic)	Pop 1980	Pop 1990	Pop 2000	Pop 2010	Pop 2020	% 1980	% 1990	% 2000	% 2010	% 2020
White alone (NH)	8,767	3,981	2,132	1,728	1,484	34.45%	11.58%	5.81%	4.87%	4.42%
Black or African American alone (NH)	75	199	307	214	124	0.29%	0.58%	0.84%	0.60%	0.37%
Native American or Alaska Native alone (NH)	158	149	143	64	35	0.62%	0.43%	0.39%	0.18%	0.10%
Asian alone (NH)	356	328	368	229	237	1.40%	0.96%	1.00%	0.65%	0.71%
Native Hawaiian or Pacific Islander alone (NH)	356	328	7	2	15	1.40%	0.96%	0.02%	0.01%	0.04%
Other race alone (NH)	36	125	38	69	101	0.14%	0.36%	0.10%	0.19%	0.30%
Mixed race or Multiracial (NH)	x	x	341	143	171	x	x	0.93%	0.40%	0.51%
Hispanic or Latino (any race)	16,058	29,583	33,328	33,028	31,392	63.10%	86.08%	90.90%	93.10%	93.54%
Total	25,450	34,365	36,664	35,477	33,559	100.00%	100.00%	100.00%	100.00%	100.00%

=== 2020 census ===
As of the 2020 census, Bell had a population of 33,559 and a population density of 13,380.8 inhabitants per square mile (5,166.4/km^{2}). The racial makeup of the city was 18.5% White, 0.6% African American, 2.7% Native American, 0.8% Asian, 0.1% Pacific Islander, 55.0% from other races, and 22.4% from two or more races. Hispanic or Latino of any race were 93.5% of the population.

The census reported that 99.8% of residents lived in households, six people (0.0%) lived in non-institutionalized group quarters, and 61 people (0.2%) were institutionalized.

The median age was 32.6 years; 26.5% of residents were under the age of 18, 11.3% were from 18 to 24, 28.8% were from 25 to 44, 23.4% were from 45 to 64, and 10.1% were 65 years of age or older. For every 100 females there were 97.7 males, and for every 100 females age 18 and over there were 95.4 males.

There were 9,253 households; 49.4% had children under the age of 18 living in them, 44.7% were married-couple households, 10.6% were cohabiting couple households, 27.0% had a female householder with no partner present, and 17.7% had a male householder with no partner present. About 13.8% of all households were made up of individuals and 5.2% had someone living alone who was 65 years of age or older. The average household size was 3.62, and there were 7,466 families (80.7% of all households).

There were 9,468 housing units at an average density of 3,775.1 units per square mile (1,457.6 units/km^{2}), of which 9,253 (97.7%) were occupied. Of these, 28.4% were owner-occupied and 71.6% were occupied by renters; 2.3% of units were vacant, including a homeowner vacancy rate of 0.3% and a rental vacancy rate of 1.6%.

100.0% of residents lived in urban areas, while 0.0% lived in rural areas.

Racial composition as of the 2020 census
Race	Number	Percent
White	6,200	18.5%
Black or African American	192	0.6%
American Indian and Alaska Native	896	2.7%
Asian	270	0.8%
Native Hawaiian and Other Pacific Islander	17	0.1%
Some other race	18,469	55.0%
Two or more races	7,515	22.4%
Hispanic or Latino (of any race)	31,392	93.5%

=== 2010 census ===
The 2010 United States census reported that Bell had a population of 35,477. The population density was 13,545.5 inhabitants per square mile (5,229.9/km^{2}). The racial makeup of Bell was 19,098 (53.8%) White (4.9% Non-Hispanic White), 337 (0.9%) African American, 315 (0.9%) Native American, 259 (0.7%) Asian, 8 (0.0%) Pacific Islander, 13,899 (39.2%) from other races, and 1,561 (4.4%) from two or more races. Hispanic or Latino of any race were 33,028 persons (93.1%).

The census reported that 34,898 people (98.4% of the population) lived in households, 490 (1.4%) lived in non-institutionalized group quarters, and 89 (0.3%) were institutionalized.

There were 8,870 households, of which 5,327 (60.1%) had children under the age of 18 living in them, 4,659 (52.5%) were opposite-sex married couples living together, 1,879 (21.2%) had a female householder with no husband present, 1,019 (11.5%) had a male householder with no wife present. There were 857 (9.7%) unmarried opposite-sex partnerships, and 31 (0.3%) same-sex married couples or partnerships. 967 households (10.9%) were made up of individuals, and 388 (4.4%) had someone living alone who was 65 years of age or older. The average household size was 3.93. There were 7,557 families (85.2% of all households); the average family size was 4.15.

11,363 people (32.0% of the population) were under the age of 18, 4,124 people (11.6%) aged 18 to 24, 10,783 people (30.4%) aged 25 to 44, 6,811 people (19.2%) aged 45 to 64, and 2,396 people (6.8%) 65 years of age or older. The median age was 28.9 years. For every 100 females, there were 101.7 males. For every 100 females age 18 and over, there were 98.5 males.

There were 9,217 housing units at an average density of 3,519.2 per square mile (1,358.8/km^{2}), of which 2,570 (29.0%) were owner-occupied, and 6,300 (71.0%) were occupied by renters. The homeowner vacancy rate was 1.6%; the rental vacancy rate was 3.3%. 11,333 people (31.9% of the population) lived in owner-occupied housing units and 23,565 people (66.4%) lived in rental housing units.

=== Ancestry ===
As of 2000, Mexican (67.7%) and Salvadoran (4.4%) were the most common ancestries. Mexico (73.1%) and El Salvador (9.8%) were the most common foreign places of birth. Bell also has a small Lebanese community.

=== Income data ===
During 2019–2023, Bell had a median household income of $60,641, with 22.8% of its residents living below the federal poverty line. The per capita income was $22,004.

== Economy ==
By December 2010, Bell was in a financial crisis due to the above-referenced public embezzlement scandals. Due to the actions of the former city's manager (Robert Rizzo) and the council in squandering the taxes of their constituents for their own benefit, there was a deficit of several million dollars in the general fund. An audit by the Los Angeles County auditor-controller concluded that the city had to significantly downsize its budget, including the possibility of disbanding its police department and contracting with the Los Angeles County Sheriff's Department.

== Government and infrastructure ==
United States presidential election results for Bell, California
Year	Republican		Democratic		Third party(ies)	
Year	No.	%	No.	%	No.	%
2000	748	17.86%	3,352	80.04%	88	2.10%
2004	1,317	22.81%	4,369	75.68%	87	1.51%
2008	1,077	16.32%	5,384	81.60%	137	2.08%
2012	846	13.03%	5,490	84.58%	155	2.39%
2016	713	9.34%	6,553	85.82%	370	4.85%
2020	1,724	18.44%	7,382	78.94%	245	2.62%
2024	2,445	31.96%	4,885	63.86%	320	4.18%

The City of Bell has a City Council-City Manager form of local government. City Council is composed of five council members who serve four-year terms, and the Mayor is elected every year by its fellow council members. The City of Bell contracts with Los Angeles County for Fire protection services, along with Animal control services.

The city has the following departments:

- City Manager's Office: Oversees the implementation of City Council policy and prepare's the City Manager's draft budget.
- City Clerks's Office- Official Record keeper of City, staff support to the City Council, and administers City Elections.
- Finance Department- Administers the city's finances including the Budget, accounts payable, accounts receivable and oversees business license renewals. The department also manages various contracts related to managing the CIty's finances.
- Community Development Department- Oversees the Building and Planning Division, Economic Development, and Public Works and Engineering.
- Community Services Department- Oversees the city's Parks and Recreations programs and Special events.
- Police Department-Provides public safety services, traffic enforcement, and parking enforcement services.

The City of Bell has 75 full-time employees across all City departments.

Fire protection in Bell is provided by the Los Angeles County Fire Department. The LACFD operates Station No. 163 at 6320 Pine Avenue in Bell as a part of Battalion 3.

The Los Angeles County Department of Health Services operates the Whittier Health Center in Whittier, serving Bell and surrounding areas.

The United States Postal Service operates the Bell Post Office at 6327 Otis Avenue and the Bandini Station Post Office at 5555 Bandini Boulevard.

=== State and federal representation ===
In the California State Legislature, Bell is in the 33rd senatorial district, represented by Democrat Lena Gonzalez, and in the 64th Assembly district, represented by Democrat Blanca Pacheco.

In the United States House of Representatives, Bell is in California's 42nd congressional district and its represented by Democrat Robert Julio Garcia

=== City government ===
After a special election in March 2011, lifelong Bell resident Ali Saleh was named mayor by his fellow council members. Danny Harber, a retired baker and 40-year resident of Bell, was elected vice mayor. Saleh vowed to remake the city whose name had become synonymous with municipal corruption into a model of good government.

== Education ==
=== Schools ===
==== Public schools ====
Bell is served by Los Angeles Unified School District (LAUSD).

A portion of Bell lies within the limits of the Montebello Unified School District, but it has no residents.

Kindergarten schools:

- Martha Escutia Primary Center (opened in 2005) (Bell)

Elementary schools:

- Corona Avenue Elementary School, K-5
- Nueva Vista Elementary School, K-5
- Woodlawn Avenue Elementary School, K-5
- Ellen Ochoa Learning Center, K-5

Middle schools:

- Chester W. Nimitz Middle School (Huntington Park)

Orchard Academy Middle Schools K-8 schools:

- Ellen Ochoa Learning Center (Cudahy)

High schools:
All residents are zoned to Bell High School in Bell. The high school population is 98% Hispanic, .02% Black, and a small population of Lebanese, and Asian and Pacific Islanders. The Mission of Bell High School is to: educate all students to the highest degree of their abilities socially, academically, and technologically so that they become contributing members of society. It is the home of the "Mighty Eagles".

Any student who lives in the Bell or Huntington Park zones may apply to Maywood Academy High School, which opened in 2005 and moved into its permanent campus in 2006. Maywood does not have its own attendance boundary because it lacks American football, track and field, and tennis facilities.

South Region Middle School 2 opened in Bell in 2010.

==== Private schools ====
Al-Hadi School is located in Bell.

=== Public libraries ===
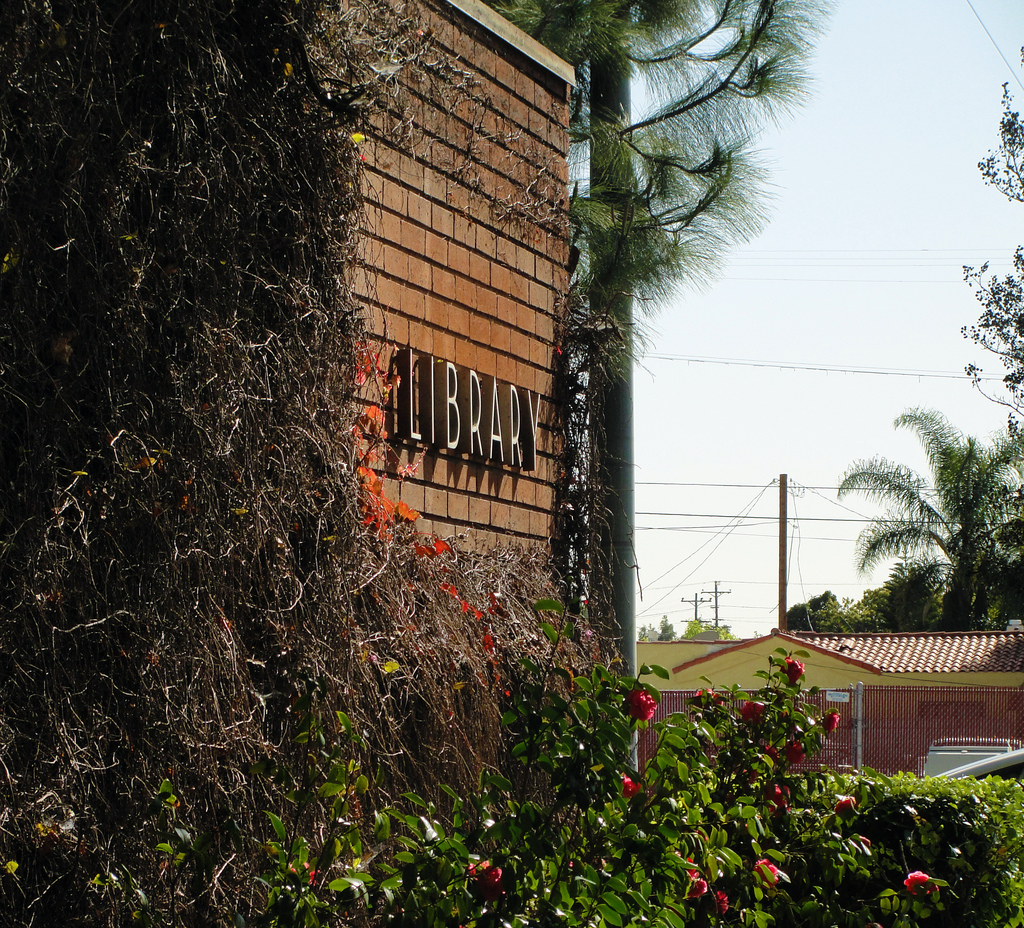
Bell Library

The County of Los Angeles Public Library operates the Bell Library at 4411 East Gage Avenue.

== Parks and recreation ==
The city of Bell has several recreational facilities. The Bell Community Center hosts many events such as anniversaries, baptisms, birthdays, conferences, company parties, receptions, and seminars. Treder Park, located at the community center, has a gazebo, a pavilion with barbecues, and picnic tables. Camp Little Bear Park and Lodge is a park designed for children 12 and under. The park includes a three-in-one area for junior players with basketball, handball, and four square courts. The park also has an outdoor amphitheater for films, a miniature golf course, an indoor lodge with classrooms and computers, picnic pavilions, play equipment, rock climbing, and a small soccer (football) turf field.

Ernest Debs Park has a synthetic turf soccer field and a shaded outdoor fitness area with cardio, resistance, and strengthening equipment. The park also has one full and two half basketball courts, benches, pavilions, picnic tables, and table games. Veterans Memorial Park has one junior (half) and two full-court basketball courts, batting cages, a baseball diamond with stadium seating and scoreboards, tree-shaded benches, a clubhouse with computer access, large picnic pavilions, tree-shaded picnic tables, a playground for ages 2 through 12, a rose garden in honor of U.S. soldiers, and a snack bar.

The city also has a joint-use agreement with the Los Angeles Unified School District (LAUSD) for the use of the Nueva Vista Elementary Soccer Field during after-school hours to facilitate youth and adult soccer programs. The Bell Futsal Park (opened in 2018) is a repurposed skate park that features one main court that can be split into 3 smaller courts.

== Notable people ==
- Cece Carlucci, professional baseball umpire
- Charlie Chant, professional baseball outfielder
- Marjorie Devaney, mathematician and computer scientist
- Neil Ferris, professional football defensive back
- Craig Fertig, professional football player and coach
- Larry Knechtel, keyboard player and bassist for The Wrecking Crew
- Mike Lee, professional baseball pitcher
- Cynthia Maughan, visual artist
- Pat North Ommert, rodeo trick rider
- Herman Reich, professional baseball player
- Ed Roth, artist and custom car designer
- Putter Smith, jazz bassist
- Valentina, drag queen
- Mark Whitehead, cyclist

== See also ==
- South Los Angeles
- Gateway Cities
