= Hollenbeck Canyon Wildlife Area =

Located near Jamul in California

Coordinates: 32°41′30″N 116°48′46″W

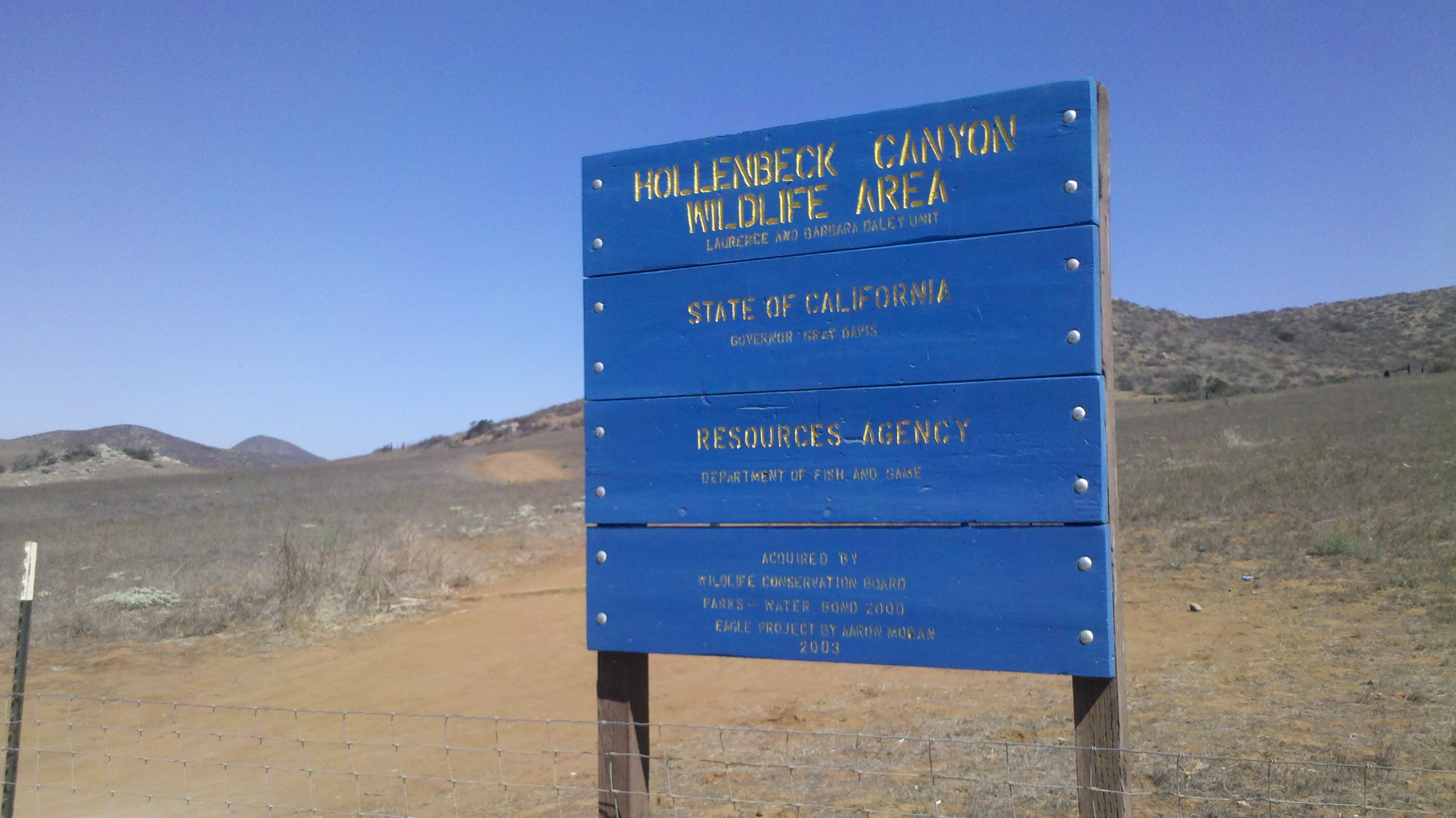
Hollenbeck Canyon Wildlife Area signpost at trailhead.

Hollenbeck Canyon Wildlife Area is located near Jamul and Dulzura in California. The former cattle ranch was designated a wildlife area in 2001, and forms a wildlife corridor between Otay Mountain Wilderness and Jamul Mountains under the protection of the California Department of Fish and Wildlife. The approximately 6,100-acre area is open to the public for activities including hunting, equestrian use, hiking, mountain-biking, and (hunting) dog training.

== History ==
The Hollenbeck Canyon Wildlife Area was once part of a Mexican land grant given in 1831 to Pio Pico with the land named as Rancho Jamul. When Mexico yielded California to the US after the Mexican-American War, the land became occupied by the Burton Family, but they lost their title at the end of the 1850s. Rancho Jamul was occupied by several farmers until the 1890s when it was acquired by a San Diego entrepreneur, who then sold it to a former San Diego Mayor in 1916 and eventually sold it in 1929 to the Daley family, who used it as a truck farm and cattle ranch. In 2001, the land was acquired by the California Department of Fish and Wildlife (CDFW) and designated as the Hollenbeck Canyon Wildlife Area in the same year. The CDFW acquired the land "to conserve, restore and protect declining sensitive species and their associated habitats in one of the largest blocks of contiguous land available in San Diego County. To provide compatible wildlife-dependent recreational opportunities to the public."

== Ecology ==
The Hollenbeck Canyon Wildlife Area is home to many plant and animal species, including San Diego sedge (Carex spissa), sedge witch (Euphyes vestris harbisonii), coastal sage scrub, and chaparral.

== Activities ==
As of Dec. 2022, a CDFW Lands Pass must be purchased to visit the Hollenbeck Canyon Wildlife Area. Officially designated hiking trails exist for visitors to hike, and dogs are permitted on a leash that is 10 feet or less in length. Mountain biking and horseback riding are permitted on established roads.

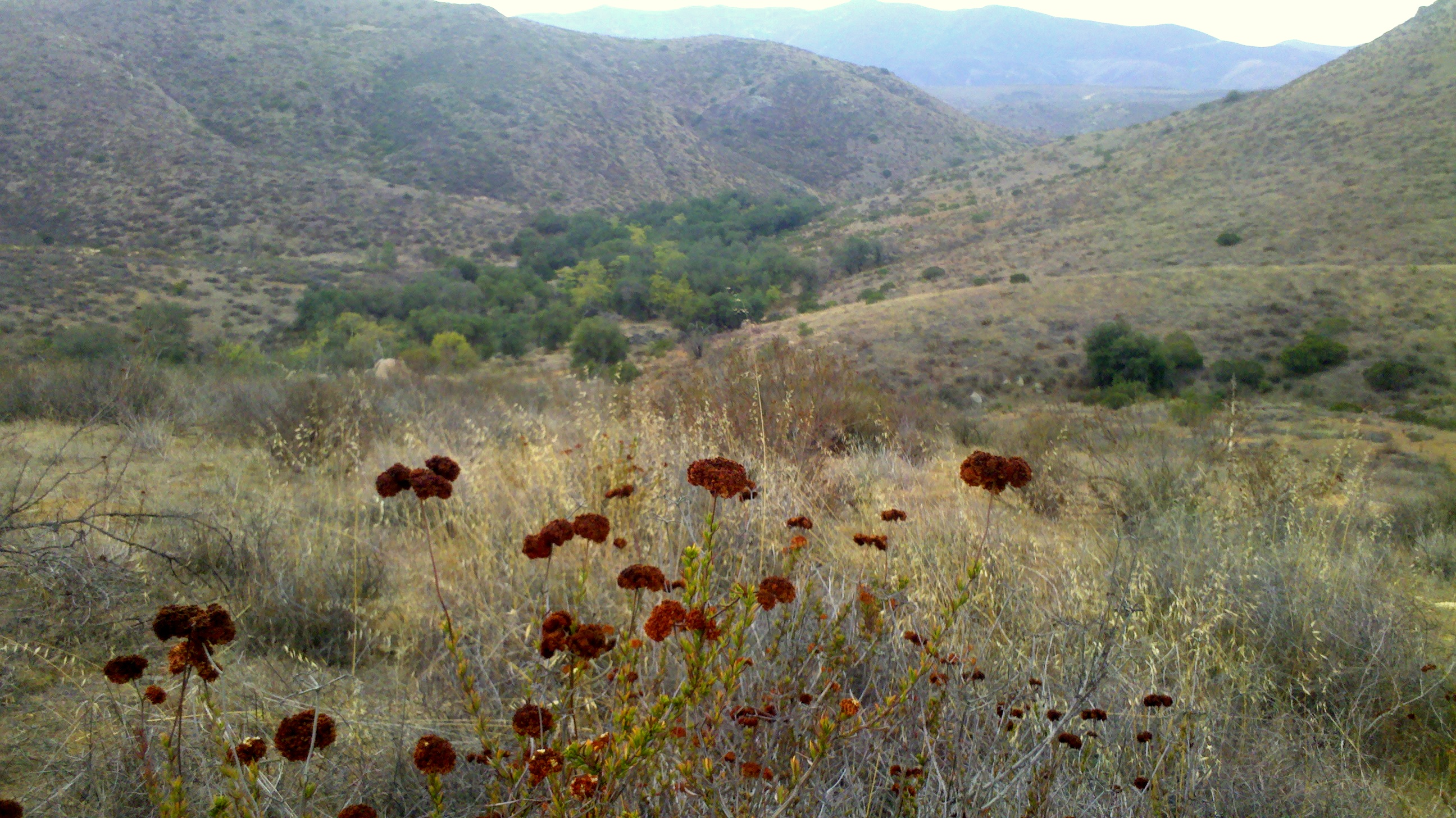
Hollenbeck Canyon Wildlife Area with chaparral, Otay mountains in the background.
