= Rancho San Antonio (Lugo) =

Land grant given to Antonio Maria Lugo

Coordinates: 34.000°N 118.120°W

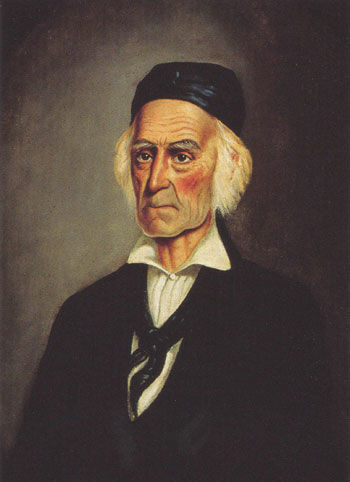
Don Antonio María Lugo was granted Rancho San Antonio in 1838 by Governor Juan Bautista Alvarado.

Rancho San Antonio was a 29,513-acre (119.43 km^{2}) Spanish land grant in present-day Los Angeles County, California that was granted to Antonio Maria Lugo. The rancho included in some part the present-day cities of Bell, Bell Gardens, Maywood, Vernon, Huntington Park, Walnut Park, Cudahy, South Gate, Lynwood, Montebello and Commerce.

== History ==
Corporal Antonio Maria Lugo, after seventeen years of military service, received his discharge and was granted the Spanish concession Rancho San Antonio in 1810. The grant was confirmed in 1838 to Antonio Maria Lugo by Mexican Governor Juan B. Alvarado. On Rancho San Antonio he built Casa de Rancho San Antonio the oldest home in Los Angeles County, California.

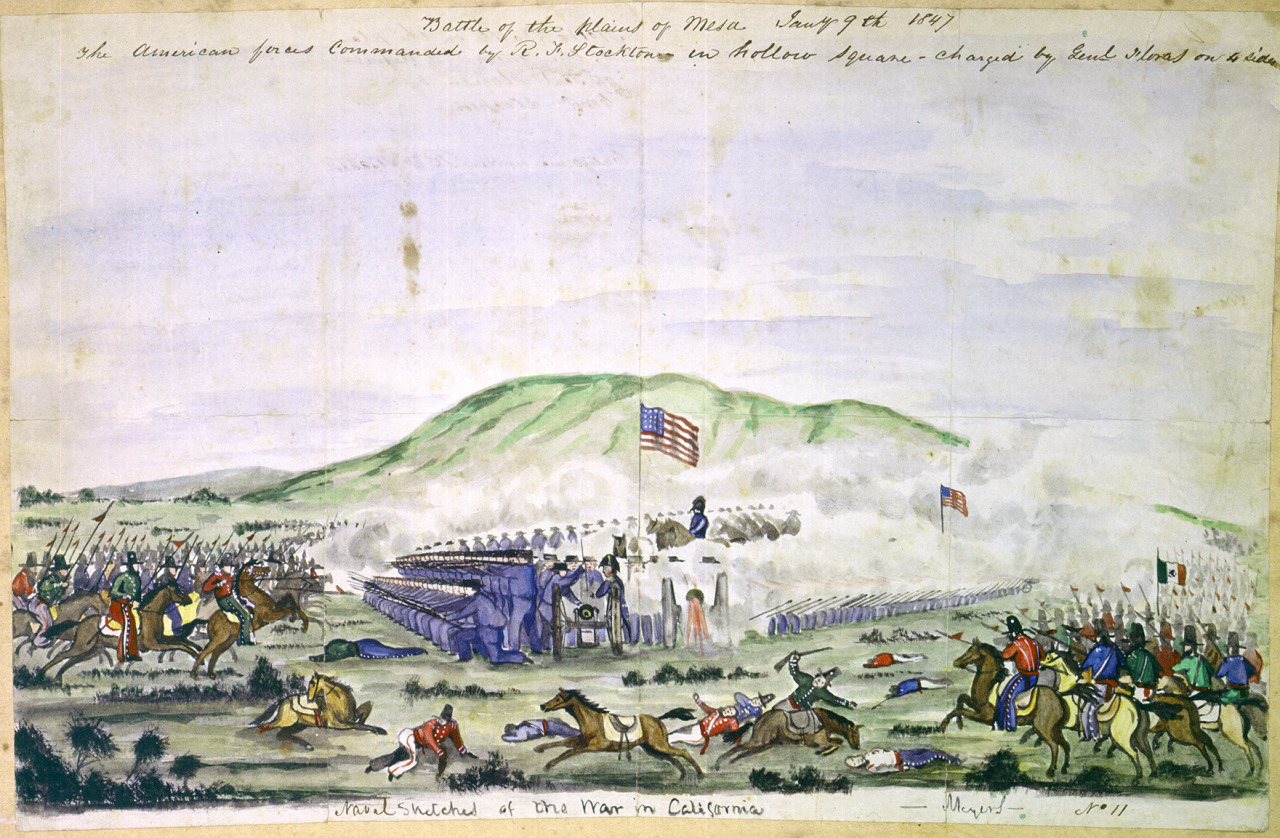
The Battle of La Mesa, which took place on the lands of Rancho San Antonio, was the last battle fought in the U.S. Conquest of California.

With the cession of California to the United States following the Mexican–American War, the 1848 Treaty of Guadalupe Hidalgo provided that the land grants would be honored. As required by the Land Act of 1851, a claim was filed with the Public Land Commission in 1852, and the grant was patented to Antonio Lugo in 1866.

In 1855 Antonio Maria Lugo, partitioned the Rancho—reserving a homestead for himself—among his sons, José Maria, Felipe, Jose del Carmen, Vicente and José Antonio, and his daughters, Vicenta Perez, Maria Antonia Yorba, and Merced Foster. In 1860 Merced Foster and Vicente Lugo sold their respective portions to parties who immediately resorted to subdivision and sale in small lots. The first deed is from Isaac Heiman to David Ward, dated June 21, 1865; followed by other sales in 1865 and 1866.

In 1908 Michael Cudahy acquired the remaining 2,800 acre (11 km^{2}) Rancho San Antonio. He subdivided the ranch and sold it as one acre (4,000 m^{2}) lots. This area was incorporated in 1960 as the City of Cudahy.

== Historic sites of the Rancho ==
- Gage Mansion. Named after Henry Gage, a one-time occupant, the ranch house was built in 1795 and is the oldest house in Los Angeles County.

== See also ==
- Ranchos of California
- List of Ranchos of California
