= Comprehensive Child Development Act =

U.S. attempt to create a national day care system

The United States Congress passed the Comprehensive Child Development Act in 1971 as part of the Economic Opportunity Amendments of 1971. The bill would have implemented a multibillion-dollar national day care system designed partially to make it easier for single parents to work and care for children simultaneously, thereby alleviating strain on the welfare system. It was vetoed by President Richard Nixon.

== History ==
The bill passed the Senate on December 2, 1971, with a vote of 63 to 17, and the House on December 7, 1971, with a vote of 211 to 187. President Richard Nixon vetoed the bill on December 10, 1971. The veto was upheld when an attempted override gained 51 votes in favor and 36 opposed, short of the supermajority needed to override a presidential veto.

Nixon's veto and his accompanying rationale reveal several staple thought processes of Cold War politics in the United States. He said that the bill would implement a "communal approach to child-rearing," tying it to broad-based fears of Communism and labeling it the "most radical piece of legislation" to have ever crossed his desk. He also said it had "family-weakening implications." The idea that America was distinguished by strong traditional families was often used (by Nixon and other American leaders) to contrast it with the USSR and to resist feminist demands for greater equality for women. Nixon's famous "kitchen debates" with Soviet Premier Nikita Khrushchev included prominent examples of this concept.

The bill incited some political backlash from anti-welfare and anti-feminist activists who opposed the idea of women in the workforce and who were leery of allowing children to be partially raised outside of the home.
