= Bell Gardens, California =

City in California, United States

- City
- Parkwest Bicycle Casino

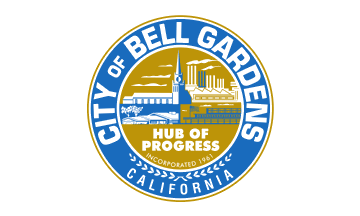
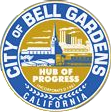
- Flag Seal
- Motto: Hub of Progress
- Interactive map of Bell Gardens, California
- Location in the Los Angeles Metro Area Bell Gardens (southern California) Bell Gardens (California) Bell Gardens (the United States) Bell Gardens (North America)
- Coordinates: 33°58′5″N 118°9′22″W
- Country: United States
- State: California
- County: Los Angeles
- Incorporated: August 1, 1961

Government
  - Type: Council-Manager government
  - Body: Mayor Jorgel Chavez; Miguel De La Rosa (Mayor Pro Tem); Marco Barcena; Isabel Guillén; Francis De Leon Sanchez
  - City manager: Michael B. O'Kelly

Area
  - Total: 2.46 sq mi (6.38 km^{2})
  - Land: 2.46 sq mi (6.37 km^{2})
  - Water: 0.0039 sq mi (0.01 km^{2}) 0.18%
- Elevation: 121 ft (37 m)

Population (2020)
  - Total: 39,501
  - Density: 16,064.1/sq mi (6,202.38/km^{2})
- Time zone: UTC-8 (PST)
  - Summer (DST): UTC-7 (PDT)
- ZIP Code: 90201, 90202
- Area code(s): 562, 213/323
- FIPS code: 06-04996
- GNIS feature IDs: 1660323, 2409817
- Website: www.bellgardens.org

Bell Gardens is a city in the U.S. state of California in the Los Angeles metropolitan area. Located in Los Angeles County, the city's population was 39,501 at the 2020 census. Bell Gardens is part of the Gateway Cities Region, a largely urbanized region located in southeastern Los Angeles County.

Bell Gardens is notable for being one of only seven Los Angeles County cities (out of 88 total) to permit casino gambling and for being home of the oldest buildings in Los Angeles County.

Bell Gardens is named after James George Bell, an American businessman. The “Gardens” in its name derives from the many Japanese who, early in Bell Gardens’ existence, established vegetable gardens and rice fields. The adjacent city of Bell is also named after James George Bell.

== History ==
=== Tongva ===
The area of Bell Gardens has a history dating back thousands of years. The Tongva established settlements in the area, including the village of Chokishgna. The village prospered until the arrival of the Spanish, after which it came under the influence of Mission San Gabriel in 1771.

=== Spanish and Mexican ===
In the late 18th century, when the area was associated with a large amount of land situated along the lower basin of the Rio Hondo area in Los Angeles County, Bell Gardens was once a bustling agricultural center for Californios during the Spanish Empire, 1509–1823, the Mexican government, 1823–1848, and the United States, after the Mexican-American War concluded in 1848.

Among those early Spanish settlers was one of California's first families, the Lugos. While stationed at Mission San Antonio de Padua near Salinas, California, Francisco Lugo's son Antonio Maria Lugo was born in 1783. In 1810 Antonio Lugo, a 35-year-old corporal in the Spanish army, was given the 29,514-acre (119.44 km^{2}) Rancho San Antonio land grant. The land grant was a reward for his military service during the establishment of the Franciscan Missions in California while being the attendant of colonization for the area. Today, the grant includes the cities of Bell Gardens, Bell, Maywood, Vernon, Huntington Park, Walnut Park, Cudahy, South Gate, Lynwood and Commerce.

Antonio Lugo built several adobe homes within the boundaries of the Rancho San Antonio grant, and raised cattle. One of the adobe houses, built in 1795, is the oldest house in Los Angeles County and is still standing at 7000 Gage Avenue. Lugo was given a term as Mayor of Los Angeles. According to Dr. Roy Whitehead in his book Lugo, "Don Antonio Maria Lugo…rode around Los Angeles and his Rancho San Antonio in great splendor. He never adopted American dress, culture or language and still spoke only Spanish. He rode magnificent horses, sitting in his $1,500 silver trimmed saddle erect and stately, with his sword strapped to the saddle beneath his left leg…People knew him far and wide, and even the Indians sometimes named their children after him, as he was one Spanish Don that they admired." Antonio María Lugo died at the age of 85 in 1860.

=== American period ===
One of his nine children, Vicente Lugo, married and built a two-story adobe home in 1850, located at 6360 Gage Avenue. A daughter of Antonio Lugo married Stephen C. Foster, Mayor of Los Angeles in 1854, and lived in an adobe house just east of 6820 Foster Bridge Road, now a parking lot. A granddaughter of Antonio Lugo married Wallace Woodworth, an early-day merchant and civic leader in Los Angeles. Their eldest son, Joseph Woodworth, built a two-story colonial style house at 6820 Foster Bridge Road in 1924. The land's original adobe dwelling was built in 1795 and named Casa de Rancho San Antonio by Lugo. When Henry T. Gage, a lawyer who married Antonia Lugo's granddaughter Frances V. Rains, occupied the residence, he added two wings and redwood siding, installed bronze fireplaces, and imported expensive fabric wallpaper from France to serve as background for the Gage coat of arms, which enjoys a place of prominence in every room.

The Bell Gardens’ school system began in 1867 when the San Antonio School was built where Bell Gardens Elementary stands today. Area farmers sent their children to the San Antonio School, which was one of the earliest educational institutions in the County of Los Angeles.

Because of the rich soil, many Japanese immigrants are part of Bell Gardens’ early history. Japanese gardeners leased land and farmed to produce quality vegetables for the marketplace. Rice fields also mushroomed within the city limits of Bell Gardens. With some of the richest agricultural land in the country, Bell Gardens remained a farming community until the 1930s.

Beginning in the 1930s, cheap homes were constructed, filled largely by defense plant workers. In 1927, Firestone Tire Company bought some of the land at $7,000 an acre. By 1900, Bell Gardens was divided into tracts of 40 to 100 acres (0.40 km^{2}). The land adjoining the City of Bell became known as Bell Gardens. Both Bell Gardens and Bell are named for James George Bell. In 1930, O.C. Beck purchased property and begins to build affordable homes for those suffering through the depression era. It was during this period that the area was known as 'Billy Goat Acres'. To this day, Bell Gardens is affectionately known by this moniker.

World War I and World War II brought defense plants to the area that helped build the economic stability and the population, which led to construction of new homes, more schools, and a prosperous business climate.

This land used to be floodplains, farmlands split into long, narrow plots by depression-era developers. Tiny houses were sold and rented to Okies and Native Americans, forced from their homes by the Dust Bowl. By the 1980s, high-wage factories had left, taking with them virtually all of the whites and many of the blacks. In their places—coming from the Mexican states of Michoacan, Jalisco, Sinaloa, and Zacatecas— were large families of immigrants. Latinos moved here for work and some brought their small businesses. Thousands of Central Americans fleeing civil wars in the 1980s also came to the region and created small businesses and worked in the same service industry jobs.

By the 1990s, Colmar Elementary changed its name to Cesar E. Chavez Elementary and 85 percent of the residents of Bell Gardens were Hispanic.

By 2013, approximately 122,000 homeowners in the southeast were Latina/o; a region where, prior to 1965, families of color could not live due to restrictive covenants.

On September 30, 2014, Bell Gardens mayor Daniel Crespo was shot dead at his home. Police took Crespo's wife into custody. Daniel Crespo's brother, William Crespo, filed a $50 million wrongful death lawsuit against Crespo's wife, Lyvette 'Levette' Crespo.

=== Gage Mansion ===
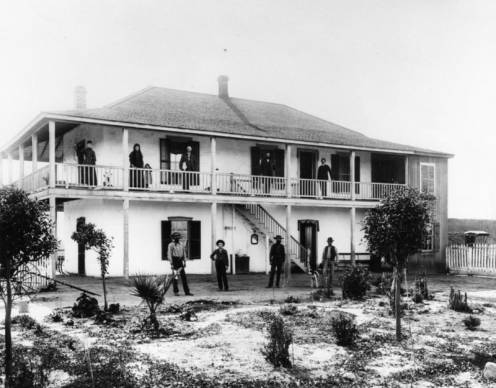
Lugo family members at their home in Bell Gardens

The oldest remaining house in Los Angeles City is the Avila Adobe located on Olvera Street (built in 1818). It is not, however, the oldest remaining house in Los Angeles County. Shane Kimbler, a Bell Gardens history enthusiast, wrote that early colonist Francisco Salvador Lugo and son Antonio María Lugo began construction in 1795 on what is now known as Casa de Rancho San Antonio or the Henry Gage Mansion. The house is located at 7000 East Gage Avenue in Bell Gardens. It was built to qualify the younger Lugo, a former Spanish colonial soldier, for a land grant from the Spanish crown.

In 1810, Antonio María Lugo completed the house and received the grant, naming his new grant Rancho San Antonio. The ranch eventually grew to encompass 29,513 acres (119.43 km^{2}), including what are now the cities of Bell Gardens, Commerce, and parts of Bell, Cudahy, Lynwood, Montebello, South Gate, Vernon and East Los Angeles. When California became part of the U.S. in 1850, Lugo, as did all recipients of Spanish/Mexican land grants, began losing portions of his land to the growing population of Anglo newcomers. The ranch adobe, however, continued to be owned and used by the Lugo family.

By 1865, most of the Lugo ranch, divided among five sons and three daughters, had been sold off for as little as a dollar per acre. The original adobe ranch home, however, remained in the family. In 1880, attorney Henry Tifft Gage, a transplant from Michigan, married one of Lugo's great-granddaughters, Francis "Fanny" Rains. The original adobe ranch home was given as a gift to Gage as a wedding dowry and it became known as the Gage Mansion. When Gage acquired the mansion he worked very extensively to restore the heritage farmhouse of early Los Angeles.

In 1898, Gage was elected to become the 20th governor of California. He served in that office from 1899 to 1903. In 1910, he was appointed by President William Howard Taft to serve as U.S. Minister to Portugal. He resigned after only one year due to his wife's health problems. Gage lived in the abode ranch house until his death in 1924.

Bell Gardens maintains only a small portion of the original Lugo land grant, which is located at the site of the Casa Mobile home Park at 7000 Gage Ave. In 1991, the park's tenants, who own the land as well as Lugo's original dwelling, were successful in their efforts to have Casa de San Antonio named State Historical Monument No. 984. Their effort ensures that Don Antonio Maria Lugo's name and his historic home will be preserved for future generations of Bell Gardens residents and Californians.

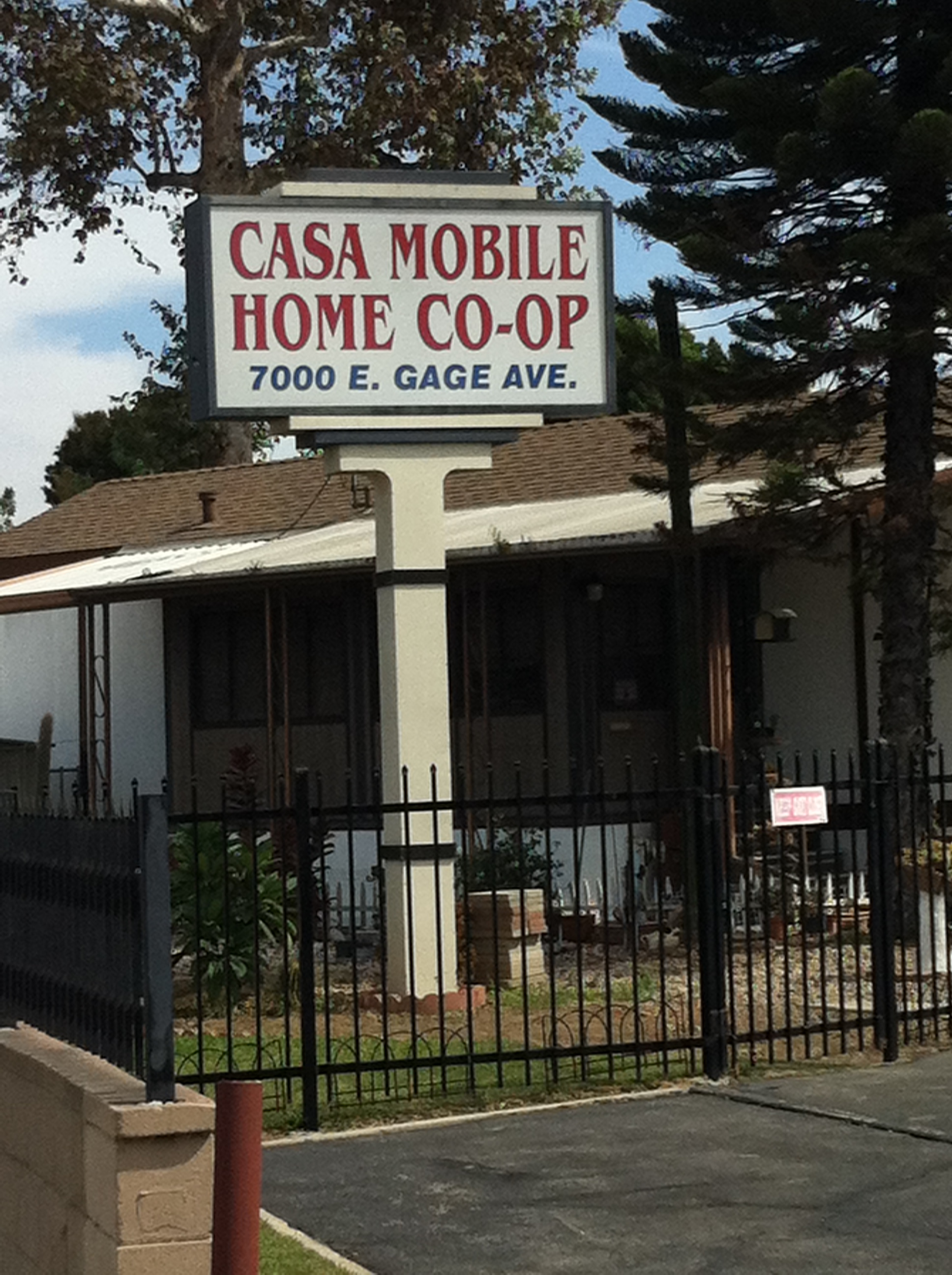
Casa Mobile Home co-op site of Henry Gage Mansion

A century later, the Gage Mansion was all that remained of the once great Rancho San Antonio. In 1983, the Casa Mobile Home Park, a cooperative of mobile home owners renting lots on the property, purchased the land and the house from their ailing landlord. Although they were aware of the historical significance of the old house, they had no means of maintaining it. In 1987, then Bell Gardens City Councilwoman Daina Daina began working to get the house listed on the state historical registry, making it eligible for maintenance grants. It is now listed as California Historical Site Number 984.

=== Indian Revival Church ===
In 1956, Assemblies of God evangelist Arthur Stoneking recognized this demographic shift and pioneered Indian Revival Center (now Indian Revival Church), a congregation for Native Americans in Bell Gardens. Stoneking, a member of the Winnebago tribe, had remarkable success in bringing together people from various tribes. Started as a home bible study, the congregation soon became the largest Native American congregation in Los Angeles. In 1990, there were 889 American Native Indian people living in Bell Gardens.

=== Miss Bell Gardens ===
An official annual city beauty pageant held in the city from 1947 ending in 2015. Successfully returning in 2020 and ending again in 2021.

== Geography ==
According to the United States Census Bureau, the city has a total area of 2.5 square miles (6.5 km^{2}), over 99% of which is land.

Bell Gardens is bordered by Bell and Cudahy on the west, Commerce on the north and northeast, Downey on the southeast, and South Gate on the southwest.

The city is approximately 10 miles (16 km) southeast of Downtown Los Angeles.

== Demographics ==
Historical population
| Census | Pop. | Note | %± |
|---|---|---|---|
| 1960 | 26,467 | | — |
| 1970 | 29,308 | | 10.7% |
| 1980 | 34,117 | | 16.4% |
| 1990 | 42,355 | | 24.1% |
| 2000 | 44,054 | | 4.0% |
| 2010 | 42,072 | | −4.5% |
| 2020 | 39,501 | | −6.1% |
U.S. Decennial Census; 1860–1870 1880-1890; 1900 1910 1920; 1930 1940 1950; 1960 1970 1980; 1990 2000 2010; 2020

Bell Gardens first appeared as an unincorporated place in the 1960 U.S. census as part of the Southeast census county division (pop. 323,103 in 1960); and as a city in 1970 U.S. census.

=== Racial and ethnic composition ===
Bell Gardens city, California – Racial and ethnic composition Note: the US Census treats Hispanic/Latino as an ethnic category. This table excludes Latinos from the racial categories and assigns them to a separate category. Hispanics/Latinos may be of any race.
| Race / Ethnicity (NH = Non-Hispanic) | Pop 1980 | Pop 1990 | Pop 2000 | Pop 2010 | Pop 2020 | % 1980 | % 1990 | % 2000 | % 2010 | % 2020 |
|---|---|---|---|---|---|---|---|---|---|---|
| White alone (NH) | 11,060 | 4,273 | 2,085 | 1,133 | 740 | 32.42% | 10.09% | 4.73% | 2.69% | 1.87% |
| Black or African American alone (NH) | 95 | 157 | 251 | 201 | 220 | 0.28% | 0.38% | 0.57% | 0.48% | 0.56% |
| Native American or Alaska Native alone (NH) | 725 | 303 | 172 | 97 | 98 | 2.13% | 0.72% | 0.39% | 0.23% | 0.25% |
| Asian alone (NH) | 165 | 419 | 228 | 226 | 200 | 0.48% | 0.99% | 0.52% | 0.54% | 0.51% |
| Native Hawaiian or Pacific Islander alone (NH) | 165 | 419 | 30 | 28 | 19 | 0.48% | 0.99% | 0.07% | 0.07% | 0.05% |
| Other race alone (NH) | 116 | 128 | 19 | 56 | 106 | 0.34% | 0.30% | 0.04% | 0.13% | 0.27% |
| Mixed race or Multiracial (NH) | x | x | 137 | 60 | 124 | x | x | 0.31% | 0.14% | 0.31% |
| Hispanic or Latino (any race) | 21,956 | 37,075 | 41,132 | 40,271 | 37,994 | 64.36% | 87.53% | 93.37% | 95.72% | 96.18% |
| Total | 34,117 | 42,355 | 44,054 | 42,072 | 39,501 | 100.00% | 100.00% | 100.00% | 100.00% | 100.00% |

=== 2020 census ===
As of the 2020 census, Bell Gardens had a population of 39,501 and a population density of 16,063.8 inhabitants per square mile (6,202.3/km^{2}).

The census reported that 98.6% of the population lived in households, 0.7% lived in non-institutionalized group quarters, and 0.7% were institutionalized.

100.0% of residents lived in urban areas, while 0.0% lived in rural areas.

The median age was 31.9 years; 26.9% of residents were under the age of 18, 11.9% were 18 to 24, 29.0% were 25 to 44, 23.0% were 45 to 64, and 9.3% were 65 years of age or older. For every 100 females there were 99.0 males, and for every 100 females age 18 and over there were 95.9 males age 18 and over.

There were 9,957 households, of which 53.2% had children under the age of 18 living in them; 47.8% were married-couple households, 10.6% were cohabiting couple households, 25.8% had a female householder with no spouse or partner present, and 15.8% had a male householder with no spouse or partner present. About 9.5% of all households were made up of individuals, and 3.3% had someone living alone who was 65 years of age or older. The average household size was 3.91. There were 8,498 families, comprising 85.3% of all households.

There were 10,192 housing units at an average density of 4,144.8 units per square mile (1,600.3 units/km^{2}), of which 2.3% were vacant. The homeowner vacancy rate was 0.0% and the rental vacancy rate was 1.6%. Of the 9,957 occupied housing units, 23.5% were owner-occupied and 76.5% were occupied by renters.

Racial composition as of the 2020 census
| Race | Number | Percent |
|---|---|---|
| White | 5,520 | 14.0% |
| Black or African American | 281 | 0.7% |
| American Indian and Alaska Native | 1,283 | 3.2% |
| Asian | 266 | 0.7% |
| Native Hawaiian and Other Pacific Islander | 23 | 0.1% |
| Some other race | 24,446 | 61.9% |
| Two or more races | 7,682 | 19.4% |
| Hispanic or Latino (of any race) | 37,994 | 96.2% |

=== Income ===
In 2023, the US Census Bureau estimated that the median household income was $55,372, and the per capita income was $18,596. About 19.0% of families and 21.8% of the population were below the poverty line.

=== 2010 census ===
The 2010 United States census reported that Bell Gardens had a population of 42,072. The population density was 17,081.5 inhabitants per square mile (6,595.2/km^{2}). The racial makeup of Bell Gardens was 20,824 (49.5%) White (2.7% Non-Hispanic White), 377 (0.9%) African American, 476 (1.1%) Native American, 261 (0.6%) Asian, 37 (0.1%) Pacific Islander, 18,787 (44.7%) from other races, and 1,310 (3.1%) from two or more races. There were 40,271 residents of Hispanic or Latino origin, of any race (95.7%).

The Census reported that 41,648 people (99.0% of the population) lived in households, 125 (0.3%) lived in non-institutionalized group quarters, and 299 (0.7%) were institutionalized.

There were 9,655 households, out of which 6,349 (65.8%) had children under the age of 18 living in them, 5,298 (54.9%) were opposite-sex married couples living together, 2,146 (22.2%) had a female householder with no husband present, 1,128 (11.7%) had a male householder with no wife present. There were 1,017 (10.5%) unmarried opposite-sex partnerships, and 49 (0.5%) same-sex married couples or partnerships. 750 households (7.8%) were made up of individuals, and 262 (2.7%) had someone living alone who was 65 years of age or older. The average household size was 4.31. There were 8,572 families (88.8% of all households); the average family size was 4.40.

The population was spread out, with 14,308 people (34.0%) under the age of 18, 5,234 people (12.4%) aged 18 to 24, 12,692 people (30.2%) aged 25 to 44, 7,637 people (18.2%) aged 45 to 64, and 2,201 people (5.2%) who were 65 years of age or older. The median age was 27.3 years. For every 100 females, there were 99.7 males. For every 100 females age 18 and over, there were 99.0 males.

There were 9,986 housing units at an average density of 4,054.4 per square mile (1,565.4/km^{2}), of which 2,318 (24.0%) were owner-occupied, and 7,337 (76.0%) were occupied by renters. The homeowner vacancy rate was 2.1%; the rental vacancy rate was 2.6%. 10,534 people (25.0% of the population) lived in owner-occupied housing units and 31,114 people (74.0%) lived in rental housing units.

According to the 2010 United States census, Bell Gardens had a median household income of $38,170, with 27.6% of the population living below the federal poverty line.

=== Latino community ===
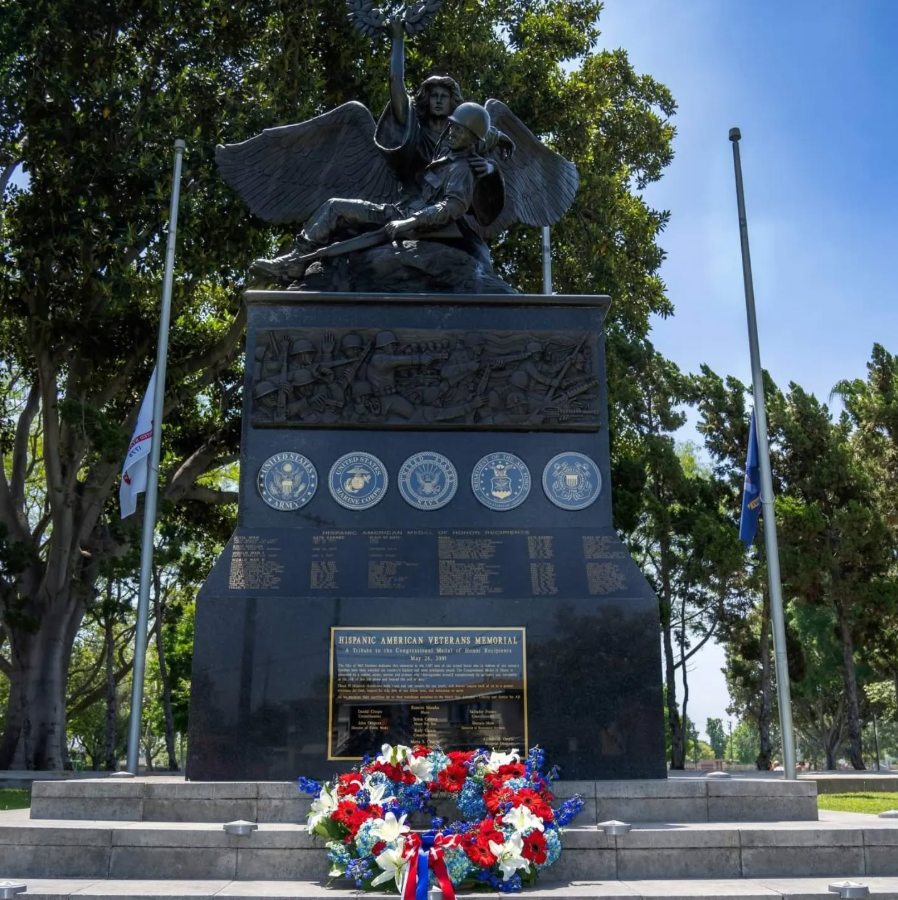
The Hispanic American Veterans Memorial, in Bell Gardens Veterans Park.

These were the ten cities or neighborhoods in Los Angeles County with the largest percentage of Latino residents, according to the 2000 census:

1. East Los Angeles, 96.7%
2. Maywood, 96.4%
3. City Terrace, 94.4%
4. Huntington Park, 95.1%
5. Boyle Heights, 94.0%
6. Cudahy, 93.8%
7. Bell Gardens, 93.7%
8. Commerce 93.4%
9. Vernon, 92.6%
10. South Gate, 92.1%

== Arts and entertainment ==
The Bicycle Hotel & Casino is located in Bell Gardens. It is one of the largest poker casinos in the world.

DEL Records, a Latin independent entertainment company, is located in Bell Gardens.

== Government ==
United States presidential election results for Bell Gardens, California
| Year | Republican | | Democratic | | Third party(ies) | |
| Year | No. | % | No. | % | No. | % |
|---|---|---|---|---|---|---|
| 2000 | 561 | 13.43% | 3,549 | 84.97% | 67 | 1.60% |
| 2004 | 1,116 | 20.67% | 4,217 | 78.12% | 65 | 1.20% |
| 2008 | 1,018 | 14.29% | 5,972 | 83.81% | 136 | 1.91% |
| 2012 | 769 | 11.14% | 6,015 | 87.14% | 119 | 1.72% |
| 2016 | 687 | 8.05% | 7,457 | 87.37% | 391 | 4.58% |
| 2020 | 1,856 | 18.03% | 8,202 | 79.68% | 236 | 2.29% |
| 2024 | 2,539 | 30.77% | 5,371 | 65.09% | 342 | 4.14% |

In the California State Legislature, Bell Gardens is in the 33rd senatorial district, represented by Democrat Lena Gonzalez, and in the 64th Assembly district, represented by Democrat Blanca Pacheco.

In the United States House of Representatives, Bell Gardens is in California's 42nd congressional district, represented by Democrat Robert Garcia.

== Education ==
In Bell Gardens, there are six elementary schools, two intermediate schools, one high school, and two adult schools.

Bell Gardens residents are served primarily by the Montebello Unified School District, including Bell Gardens High School.

Every public school in Bell Gardens has an urban farm run by members of the Environmental Garden Club, an after-school program.

== Infrastructure ==
Fire protection in Bell Gardens is provided by the Los Angeles County Fire Department. The LACFD operates Station #39 in Bell Gardens as a part of Battalion 3. The Bell Gardens Police Department provides law enforcement.

The Los Angeles County Department of Health Services operates the Whittier Health Center in Whittier, serving Bell Gardens.

The United States Postal Service Bell Gardens Post Office is located on Garfield Ave. The Postal Service also operates a Network Distribution Center on Bandini Boulevard north of Bell Gardens, in the City of Commerce.

There are 8 parks and one golf course in the city limits.

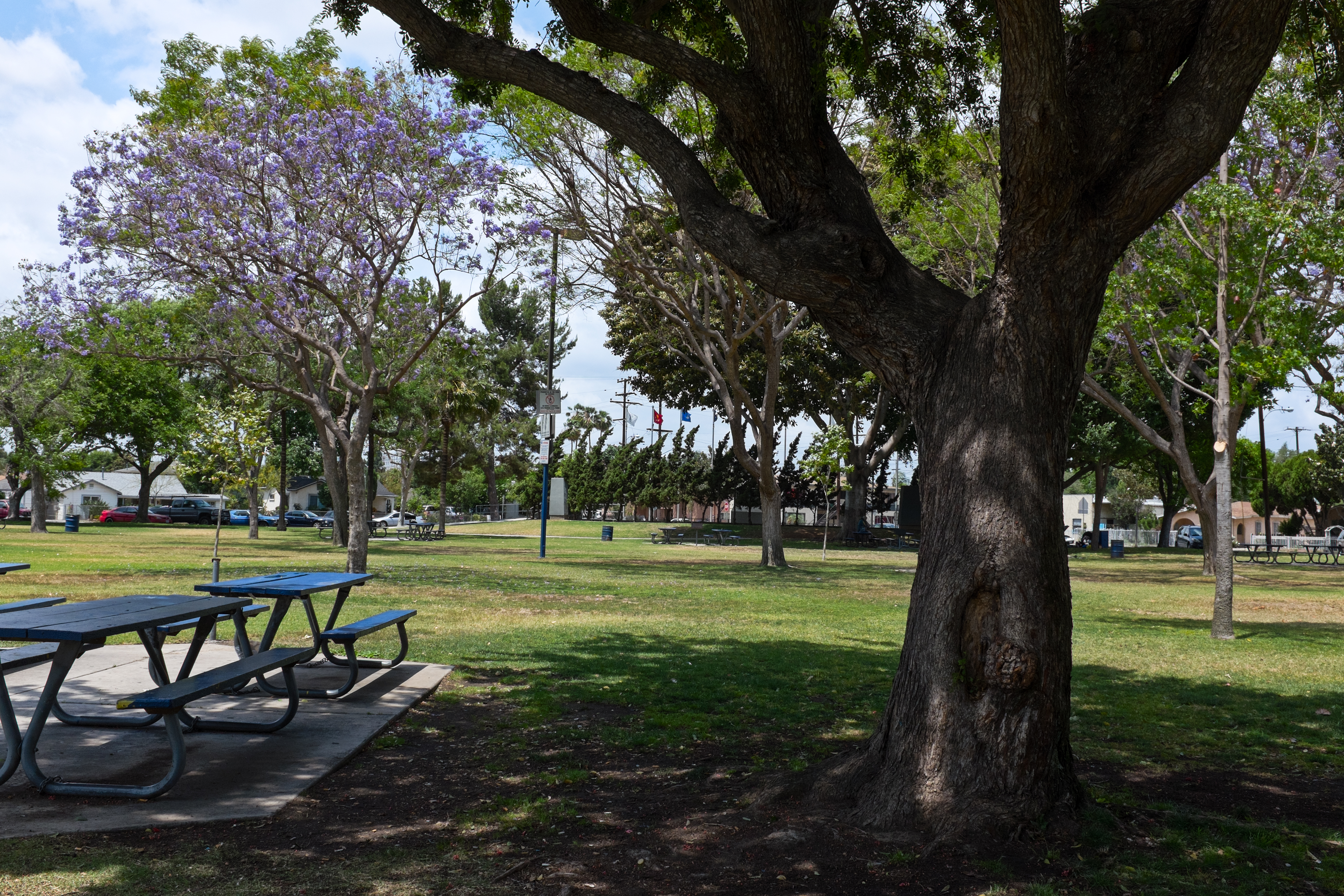
Veterans Park Bell Gardens CA 1

== Notable people ==
- Tim Buckley, American musician
- Eddie Cochran, American musician
- John Force, NHRA Funny Car Driver / Champion
- Ricardo Lara, 8th Insurance Commissioner of California
- Cristina Garcia, California State Assembly from the 58th district

== See also ==
- List of cities and towns in California
