= John Edward Hollenbeck =

American businessman (1829-1885)

John E. Hollenbeck
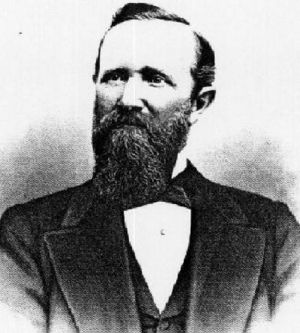
- John E. Hollenbeck at an unknown date

Personal details
- Born: June 5, 1829 Summit County, Ohio
- Died: September 2, 1885 (aged 56) Los Angeles County, Los Angeles
- Spouse: Elizabeth Hatsfeldt Hollenbeck
- Children: John E. Hollenbeck Jr.

John Edward Hollenbeck (June 5, 1829 – September 2, 1885) was an American businessman and investor who was involved in the 19th-century development of Nicaragua and the city of Los Angeles, California.

== Early life ==
J. Edward Hollenbeck was born in Hudson, Ohio, and later moved with his parents to Winnebago County, Illinois. He had limited schooling and, in 1846, decided that he did not wish to be a farmer. With his father's permission, the young man left home to make his own way. After doing day labor for traveling funds, he returned to Ohio and apprenticed himself to learn the machinist's trade with Bell and Chamberlain in Cuyahoga Falls. He became a master of this trade in three years but declined to join his employers’ business as a partner.

== In Nicaragua ==
Instead of establishing himself in business in Ohio, young Hollenbeck decided to travel to the California gold fields. He took passage on a sailing vessel from New Orleans to Aspinwall, now Colón, in Panama. Upon his arrival, however, the steamer upon which he had booked passage broke down, and he contracted a fever while waiting for repairs. He was too ill to continue traveling and sold his remaining ticket for California.

The coastal areas of Panama and Nicaragua, and particularly the community of Greytown, Nicaragua, were growing rapidly due to the area's position as the eastern terminus of a transport operation owned by American Cornelius Vanderbilt's Accessory Transit Company. This transportation network carried thousands of travelers each month from the Atlantic to the Pacific side of Central America on their way to the gold rush in San Francisco. Sail and steam-ships traveled from New York and New Orleans in the United States to Greytown. From there, small boats transported passengers up the San Juan River and across Lake Nicaragua. Then, mules, horses, or stagecoaches carried them over the small isthmus between the lake and San Juan del Sur, Rivas on the Pacific where they would embark on ships traveling the coast between Panama and Nicaragua and California.

After recovering his health, Hollenbeck took a position as an engineer on a steamer running up the Chagres River. He continued to work on steamers, running from Aspinwall and Chagres to Greytown, Nicaragua, and up the San Juan River. Around 1852, Hollenbeck began the first of a number of businesses ventures in Nicaragua. In Greytown, he furnished entertainment to travelers on the route from Nicaragua to California. At Castillo Rapids, he established a general merchandise store, and won a contract with the Transit Company cutting wood for fuel for the San Juan River steamers. In the spring of 1853 he purchased the Nicaragua Hotel at Castillo Rapids, which he continued to operate under the name of the American Hotel, until it was burned during a filibuster attack on February 15, 1857. At the time of the purchase, the hotel was managed by Elizabeth Hatsfeldt, originally from Mainz, Germany, who had recently immigrated to Nicaragua from New Orleans. In January 1854, he married the young widow.

However, the community's economic base was damaged when, on 13 July 1854, the United States Navy sloop USS Cyane bombarded and burned Greytown in retaliation for reported local actions against American citizens. The action was a culmination of a confrontation between Americans and the townspeople over tariffs and control of transit routes. The destruction was reported around the world, including an illustration in the Illustrated London News. Soon after, the San Juan River changed course and the town was again seriously damaged. Greytown was rebuilt after its destruction and again began to prosper.

However, in 1855, the American filibuster William Walker installed himself as President of Nicaragua and revoked the charter of the Accessory Transit Company and then assumed its assets. Hollenbeck and his wife were evacuated with other families from El Castillo the day before the filibuster attack on February 15, 1857, which destroyed the hamlet by fire. Walker was in turn ousted two months later by a Central American coalition. In May 1857, Hollenbeck was rewarded for his loyalty by the Costa Ricans by receiving a government contract and having the former Accessory Transit Company house given to him in replacement of the destroyed American Hotel.

Walker and his followers attempted to retake Nicaragua in November 1857, when they entered Greytown harbor and camped at nearby Puntas Arenas. A squad of Costa Ricans affiliated with Walker raided Castillo Rapids, and took Hollenbeck and his wife as prisoners. The couple was held up river on the San Juan River for two weeks, and then moved to Lake Nicaragua for an additional two months. During their captivity, the family's store, house and goods in Castillo Rapids were burned. US Marines and Nicaraguan forces soon surrounded the invaders and captured Walker. Hollenbeck and his wife were freed.

Finding their property destroyed, the couple set out for Illinois where their only son, John Edward Hollenbeck Jr., had been sent to his grandparents during the crisis. However, upon arriving in New York, they learned the two-year-old child had died of diphtheria. They returned to Greytown again, and Hollenbeck rebuilt his general merchandise business there. He also began diversifying, buying a river steamer from the now-struggling Transit Company.

In the fall of 1860 Hollenbeck considered returning to the United States, and briefly established a home in Missouri. He continued to travel to Central America to manage his businesses. However, the impending conflict of the American Civil War caused great economic concern. With the outbreak of war, an embargo was laid on travel and business; railroads were torn up and soldiers quartered in every town. So, he and his wife returned yet again to Greytown in 1865. Shortly after his return, he obtained commissions as an agent for the Royal Mail ships and agent for an English mining company, shipping large quantities of India rubber, Brazil wood, hides, cedar, rosewood, coffee, indigo, and other products. On June 6, 1867, he and his wife arrived in New York City from Greytown, continuing to Hamburg, Germany, from where they returned to New York City on Sept. 28, 1867. After returning to Central America, the Hollenbecks were back in New York City on October 6, 1869. About 1872, the Transit Company closed all its Nicaraguan operations and Hollenbeck, with three partners, bought all the American company's property and assets.

== In California ==
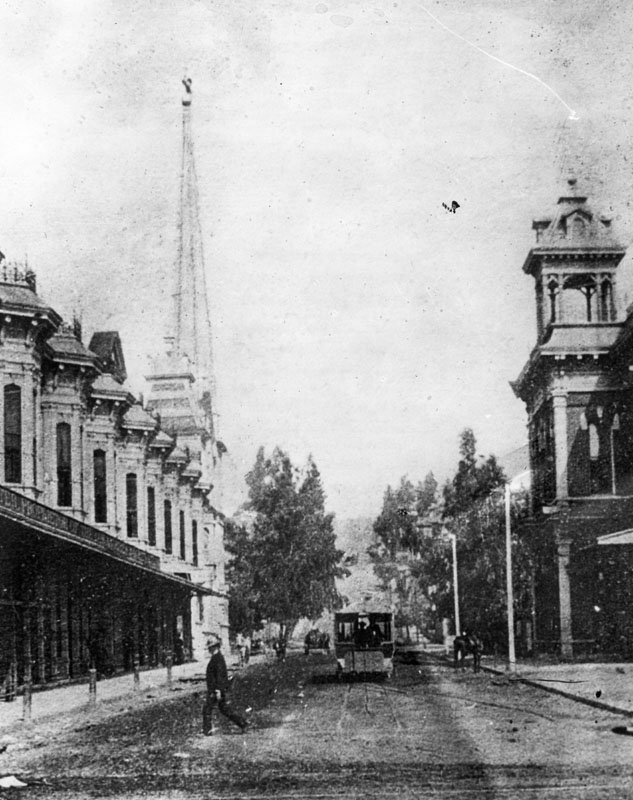
On right Second Street Los Angeles City Hall between 1884 and 1888, left Hollenbeck Block, with the First Presbyterian Church in back

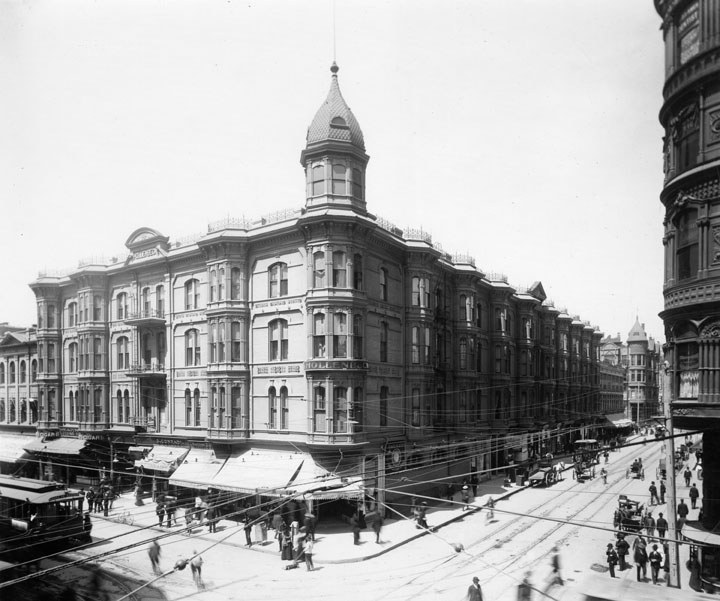
Hollenbeck Hotel in 1890 at the corner of Spring and Second, demolished in 1933

In 1874, a wealthy man but experiencing health difficulties, Hollenbeck and his wife visited Los Angeles, California. The community was growing rapidly, and businesses were investing heavily in anticipation of the coming of the Southern Pacific Railroad. While visiting California, Hollenbeck purchased several parcels of real estate and deposited funds in Temple and Workman Bank. Hollenbeck soon closed out his Nicaraguan businesses and made his final move to the United States. Prior to his leaving Nicaragua, the Government appointed him Minister Plenipotentiary to the United States, and on his return he visited Washington, D.C., transacting business for the Nicaraguan government in this capacity.

Arriving in Los Angeles early in the spring of 1876, Hollenbeck purchased land on the east side of the Los Angeles River, and built a large residence with broad verandas and a tower on extensive grounds on Boyle Avenue. He made twenty-seven acquisitions of property by 1880; spending $108,875 for a total of 6,738 acres (2,727 hectares). The real estate holdings included 600 acres (240 ha) south of the city limits, much of which was planted in vineyards. In the San Gabriel Valley, he owned orchards of oranges, lemons, and grapes; and invested in 3,500 acres (1,400 ha) of Rancho La Puente — a grain and stock ranch. In 1884 he purchased and developed an urban business district, known as the Hollenbeck Block, within Los Angeles, this included the Hollenbeck Hotel.

Hollenbeck was elected to the Los Angeles Common Council, the governing body of the city, on December 3, 1877, for a term ending on December 6, 1878.

In 1878 Hollenbeck became a stockholder in the Commercial Bank of Los Angeles, and was elected its president. On June 18, 1880, Hollenbeck was listed in the Federal census as a capitalist, he and his wife were raising a Nicaraguan mulatto teenage ward, and they had four servants, including two Chinese and a Mexican. In 1881, he and other investors organized and established the First National Bank. In 1880, Hollenbeck, with former California Governor John G. Downey, horticulturalist Ozro W. Childs and other associates, persuaded the State of California to purchase 160 acres (65 ha) in Los Angeles to foster agriculture in the southland. The property, then known as Agriculture Park, is now known as Exposition Park, home to the Los Angeles Coliseum and the Los Angeles County Museums. On July 2, 1883, Hollenbeck received an American passport to travel abroad, which described him as being 5 feet 8 1/2 inches (1.74 m) tall, having blue eyes and a light complexion. He last appeared on the Los Angeles City Electors List on August 4, 1884, where his occupation was listed as farmer.

His sister, Susan Abiah Wells, married James George Bell.

== Legacy ==
- Hollenbeck Canyon Wildlife Area
- Hollenbeck Park
- Hollenbeck Division Los Angeles Police Department
