= Marian McCargo =

American tennis player and actress (1932–2004)

Marian McCargo Bell
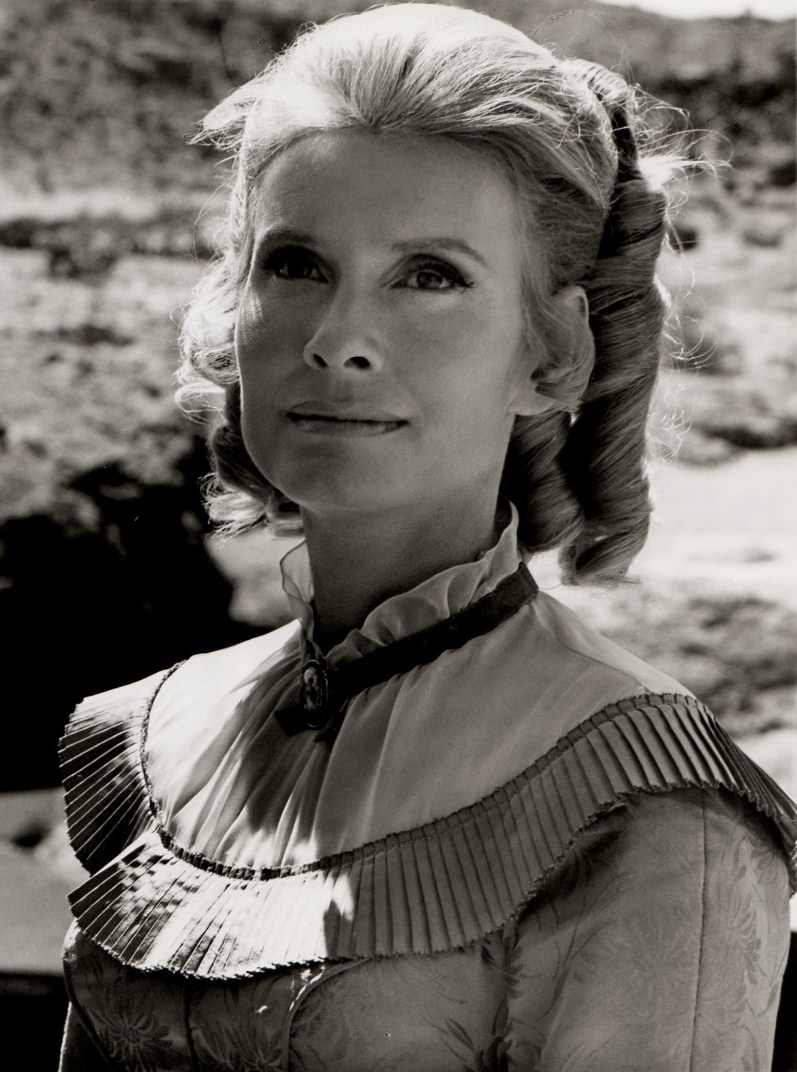
- Marian McCargo in 1969
- Born: Marian McCargo; March 18, 1932
- Died: April 7, 2004 (aged 72); Santa Monica, California, U.S.
- Other name: Marian Moses
- Education: West Hills College, Boston
- Occupations: Actress, tennis player
- Years active: 1963–2004
- Spouse(s): Richard Cantrell Moses Sr. (m. 1951; div. 1963) Alphonzo E. Bell Jr. (m. 1970)
- Children: 4, including Rick and William R. Moses

Marian McCargo Bell (March 18, 1932 (Note: Resting Places: The Burial Sites of More Than 14,000 Famous Persons, 3rd edition, gives her date of birth as February 19, 1932.) – April 7, 2004) was an American actress and champion tennis player who later found success in film and television roles. She was sometimes credited as Marian Moses.

== Early life and education ==
McCargo graduated from Miss Porter's School in Farmington, Connecticut, and attended Boston's West Hills College. In 1951, she married Richard Cantrell Moses, who later became an advertising executive in Los Angeles. They had four sons: actors Rick and William R. Moses, director Harry Moses, and Graham Moses. They were divorced in 1963.

== Acting career ==
McCargo first entered acting as a supporting player on such popular television shows as Perry Mason (in 1964 she played murder victim Sibyll Pollard in "The Case of the Latent Lover"; and in 1965 she played defendant Louise Selff in "The Case of the Wrathful Wraith".) Her other television show appearances included: Hawaii Five-O, Hogan's Heroes, Voyage to the Bottom of the Sea, Mannix, Gomer Pyle, USMC, and The Man from U.N.C.L.E..

McCargo made her feature-film debut in the crime comedy Dead Heat on a Merry-Go-Round in 1966, which was also the debut film of Harrison Ford. Subsequent film roles included: Buona Sera, Mrs. Campbell in 1968 (playing opposite Peter Lawford, Gina Lollobrigida, Shelley Winters, Telly Savalas, and Phil Silvers); The Undefeated in 1969 (with John Wayne and Rock Hudson); and Doctors' Wives in 1971. McCargo also became known for her television role as Harriet Roberts on the nighttime soap, Falcon Crest.

== Political wife ==
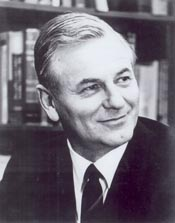
McCargo's husband, Congressman Alphonzo Bell

In 1970, McCargo married U.S. Congressman Alphonzo E. Bell Jr. of California, a widower with three sons of his own. They had met while she was starring with John Wayne in The Undefeated, Wayne being a close personal friend of Bell's. She then retired from acting to become a political wife.

== Death ==
McCargo died of pancreatic cancer in 2004, in Santa Monica, California, just eighteen days before her husband Alphonzo.
