= Voltex Light Bar Company =

VOLTEX Lights
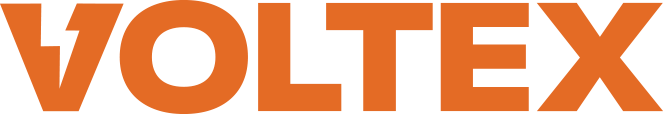
- Voltex Lights logo
- Type: Incorporation
- Industry: Public Safety
- Genre: Roadside Safety Equipment and Lighting
- Founded: 2006
- Founder: David Shin
- Headquarters: Paramount, CA USA, Paramount, California, United States
- Number of locations: North America, North Asia
- Area served: North America, North Asia
- Products: Warning Light Bars, Arrow Boards, VMS Boards
- Services: Manufacture, Distributor
- Parent: Mega Distribution Int'l Inc.
- Divisions: Vehicle Warning Lights, Arrow Boards, VMS Boards
- Subsidiaries: VOLTEX Lights. NSE - National Safety Equipment Company
- Footnotes; US Patents, US Trademarked Certified and Registered with USPTO

The VOLTEX Lights is an American company based in Paramount, California that specializes in design, development and distribution of signaling devices for the fire and rescue, law enforcement, security enforcement, roadside construction and towing industries serving North America and North Asia.

Established in 2006, VOLTEX International Inc. and VOLTEX Light Bar company has grown significantly in the US market and expanding globally since 2009 with distribution and manufacturing capabilities in 3 continents throughout the world.

== Subsidiary ==
VOLTEX Light Bars and VOLTEX Arrow Boards, VOLTEX OEM Headlights, VOLTEXLIGHTS.COM and NSE National Safety Equipment Company manufacturer of hand built roadside arrow boards

== Specialty ==
VOLTEX specializes in all kinds of emergency vehicle lighting, light bars and other electronic products and has numerous patents and trademarks registered globally.
