= Lytes Rustlers =

- City: Paramount, California
- League: North American Junior Hockey League
- Founded: 1990
- Folded: 1991
- Colors: Black and gold

Franchise history
- 1990–91: Lytes Rustlers

The Lytes Rustlers were a Junior A ice hockey team that played in the North American Junior Hockey League. The team was based out of Paramount, California but played their home games in St. Louis, Missouri.

== History ==
The Lytes Rustlers were a travel team based out of Paramount, California that began in the 1980. In 1987, general manager Larry Bruyere reached an agreement with the North American Junior Hockey League to form a Tier II junior club and join the league for the 1990–91 season. Because the organization was located so far away from any of the other active NAJHL teams, the Rustlers also reached an agreement to play their home games in rinks around the St. Louis area. Despite their plans, the Rustlers had one of the worst seasons in the history of the league, winning just once in 40 games. Unsurprisingly, the tier II team withdrew from the league after the season and was dissolved.

== Season-by-season records ==
Season	GP	W	L	T	Pts	GF	GA	Finish	Playoffs
1990–91	40	1	38	1	3	-	-	4th of 4, Eastern Div. 8th of 8, NAJHL	Missing information
