= Resurfice Corporation =

Canadian manufacturer of ice resurfacers

- Type: Private
- Founded: 1967; 59 years ago
- Founder: Andrew Schlupp
- Headquarters: Elmira, Ontario, Canada,
- Area served: Worldwide
- Website: Official website

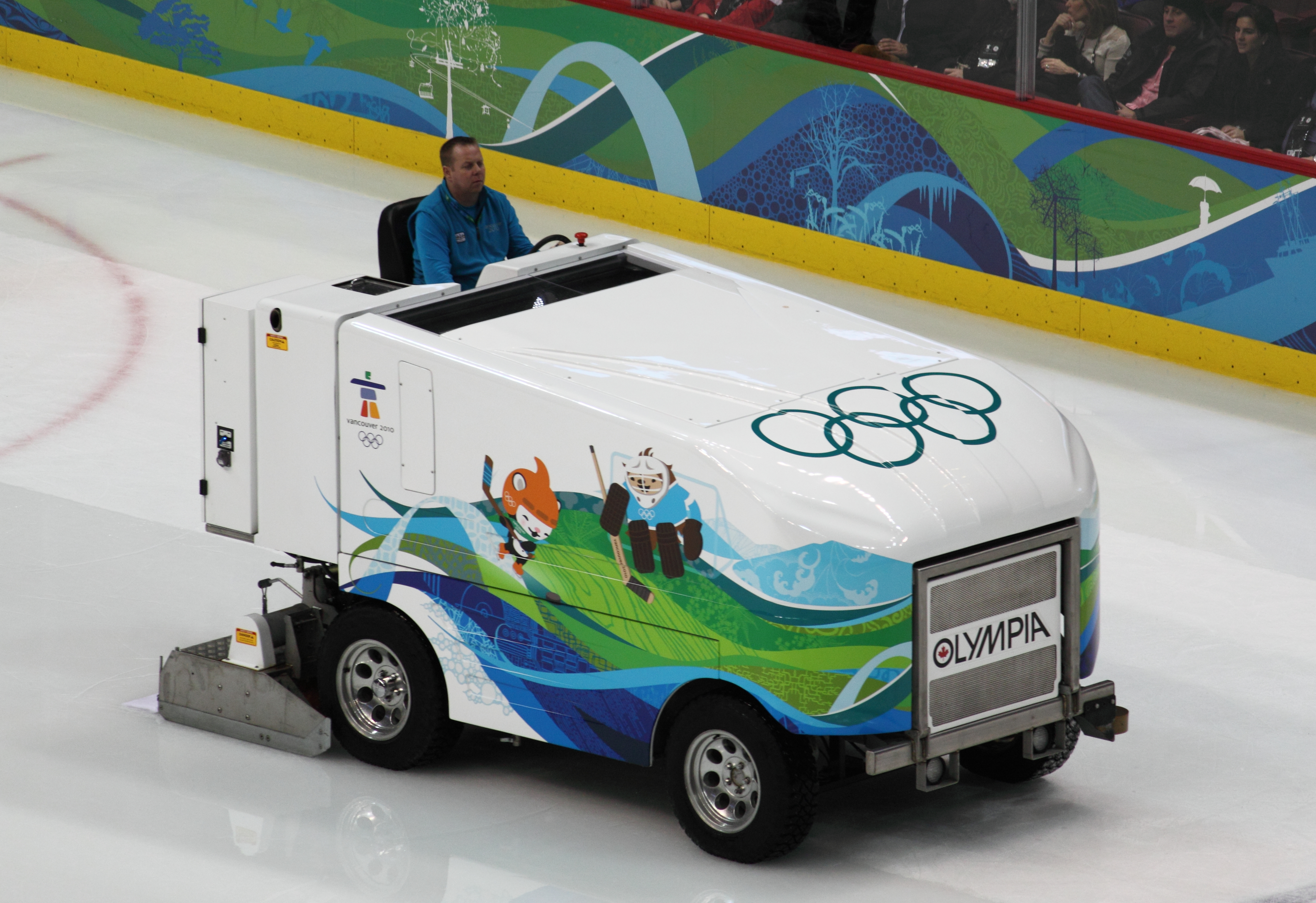
Olympia ice resurfacer at the 2010 Winter Olympics

Resurfice Corporation is a manufacturer of ice resurfacing equipment based in Elmira, Ontario, Canada. Their Olympia brand product line includes push models through full size models built on a Chevrolet powertrain. In early 2009, Don Schlupp, the company's director of sales and marketing, said that the company had about a 70% share of the market in North America, but later that year the company said it produces about the same number of machines as Zamboni.

The company was selected as the official supplier of ice resurfacing equipment to the 2010 Winter Olympics in Vancouver in a lease of 17 machines. This also included a contract to develop battery powered machines resulting in the development of the Olympia Cellect. The Cellect is powered by NiCad batteries, recharges fully in 6–8 hours to provide 30-35 resurfacings before recharging. A pair of Olympia Cellect resurfacers failed while working the ice at the speed skating venue during the olympics forcing organizers to quickly bring in a Zamboni resurfacer in use at the speed skating venue in Calgary used in the 1988 Winter Olympics. Resurfice issued a press release stating that the issues were due to maintenance issues, not design.

While competitor Zamboni was named official ice resurfacer of the National Hockey League, this was largely for licensing purposes and some NHL teams such as the Carolina Hurricanes, St. Louis Blues, and Vancouver Canucks continue to use Olympia machines, even featuring them in television commercials.
