= Leon Neal =

American football player (born 1972)

No. 20
- Position: Running back

Personal information
- Born: September 11, 1972 (age 54); Saint Paul, Minnesota, U.S.
- Listed height: 5 ft 9 in (1.75 m)
- Listed weight: 185 lb (84 kg)

Career information
- High school: Paramount (Paramount, California)
- College: Washington
- NFL draft: 1996: 6th round, 196th overall pick

Career history
- Buffalo Bills (1996)*; Indianapolis Colts (1996–1997)
- * Offseason or practice squad member only

Career NFL statistics
- Return yards: 23
- Stats at Pro Football Reference

Leon Neal (born September 11, 1972) is an American former professional football player who was a running back for the Indianapolis Colts of the National Football League (NFL). He played college football for the Washington Huskies. Neal was selected by the Buffalo Bills in the sixth round of the 1996 NFL draft before playing for the Colts.

== Early life ==
Neal attended Paramount High School in Paramount, California.

== College career ==
Neal played for the Washington Huskies from 1991 to 1995 for coaches Don James and Jim Lambright. Neal and six teammates, "The Medford Seven," were severely injured in an automobile accident while travelling home to California during winter break in 1991. Neal primarily served as a backup to Napoleon Kaufman, until starting his senior season in 1995.
