= Antonio Pierce =

American football player and coach (born 1978)

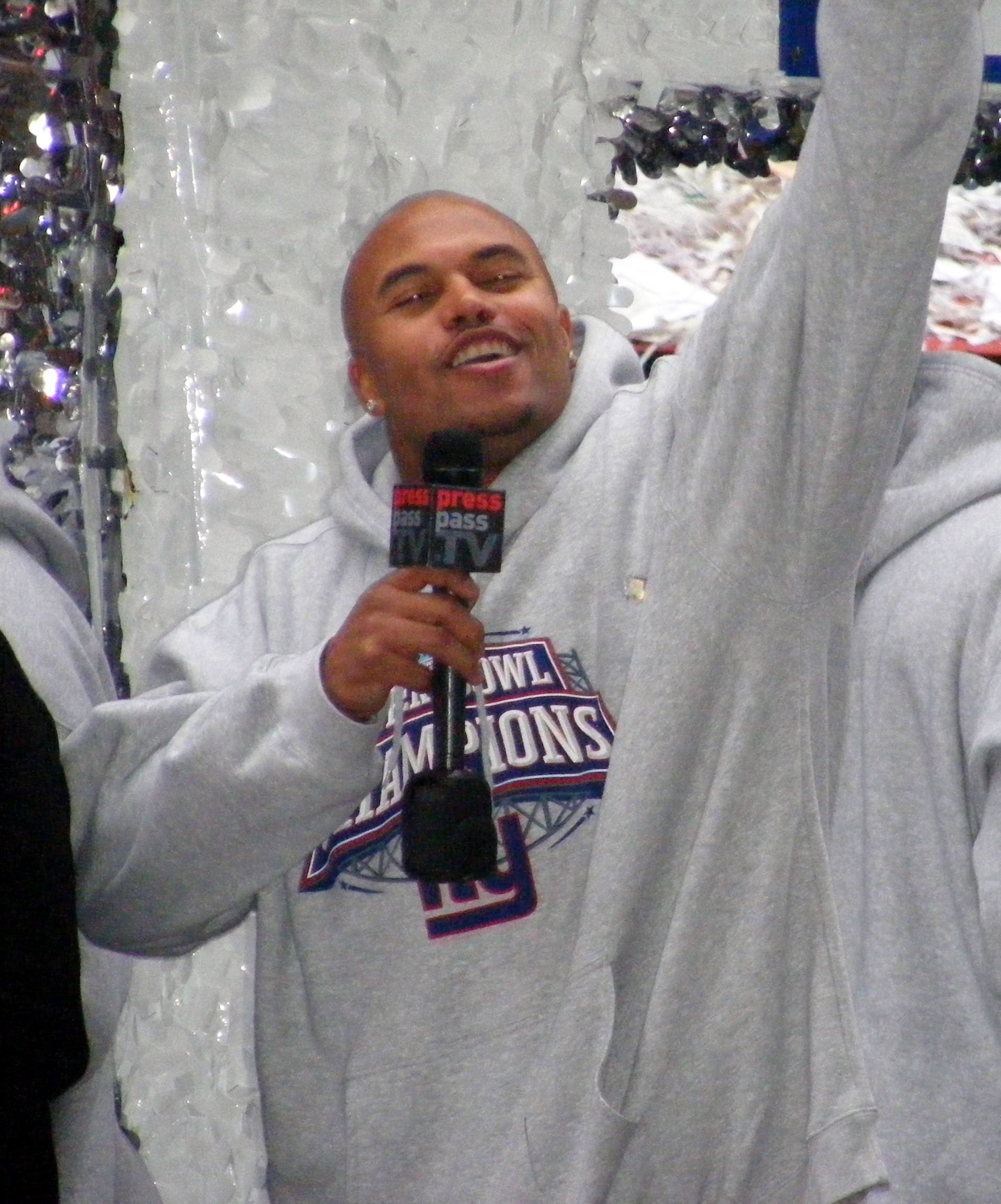
- Pierce with the New York Giants in 2008

No. 58
- Position: Linebacker

Personal information
- Born: October 26, 1978 (age 48); Long Beach, California, U.S.
- Listed height: 6 ft 1 in (1.85 m)
- Listed weight: 238 lb (108 kg)

Career information
- High school: Paramount (Paramount, California)
- College: Mt. San Antonio (1997–1998); Arizona (1999–2000)
- NFL draft: 2001: undrafted

Career history

Playing
- Washington Redskins (2001–2004); New York Giants (2005–2009)

Coaching
- Long Beach Poly HS (CA) (2014–2017) Head coach; Arizona State (2018–2019) Linebackers coach & recruiting coordinator; Arizona State (2020) Associate head coach, co-defensive coordinator, linebackers coach, & recruiting coordinator; Arizona State (2021) Associate head coach, defensive coordinator, & recruiting coordinator; Las Vegas Raiders (2022–2023) Linebackers coach; Las Vegas Raiders (2023) Interim head coach; Las Vegas Raiders (2024) Head coach

Awards and highlights
- As player: Super Bowl champion (XLII); Pro Bowl (2006); 71st greatest New York Giant of all-time

Career NFL statistics
- Total tackles: 691
- Sacks: 9
- Forced fumbles: 8
- Fumble recoveries: 10
- Interceptions: 7
- Defensive touchdowns: 2
- Stats at Pro Football Reference

Head coaching record
- Regular season: 9–17 (.346)
- Career: 9–17 (.346) (NFL); 31–15 (.674) (high school)
- Coaching profile at Pro Football Reference

Antonio Durran Pierce (born October 26, 1978) is an American professional football coach and former linebacker. He served as the head coach for the Las Vegas Raiders of the National Football League (NFL) in 2023 and 2024.

Pierce played nine seasons as a linebacker in the NFL and he won a Super Bowl playing with the New York Giants in the 2007 season. He played college football for the Arizona Wildcats and was signed as an undrafted free agent by the Washington Redskins, and later played for the Giants. In 2014, Pierce began his coaching career as the head coach at Long Beach Polytechnic High School and then served as an assistant coach at Arizona State University from 2018 to 2021.

== Early life ==
Pierce played high school football at Paramount High School in Paramount, California. As a senior for the Pirates, Pierce earned All-CIF Southern Section Division 2 accolades at linebacker while also playing at the fullback position.

He then played two years of football at Mount San Antonio College in Walnut, California, before transferring to the University of Arizona. In the fall of 1997 as a sophomore, Pierce helped lead Mt. SAC to the CCCAA state title, intercepting a pass for the Mounties in the fourth quarter of a 38–35 win over San Francisco City College.

As a senior at Arizona, he had three sacks, 77 tackles (ten for losses), two forced fumbles, one interception, and one blocked kick, earning All-Pac-10 honorable mention.

Pierce was not taken in the 2001 NFL draft after his senior year because many NFL scouts considered him too undersized to play linebacker in the NFL.

== Playing career ==
=== Washington Redskins ===
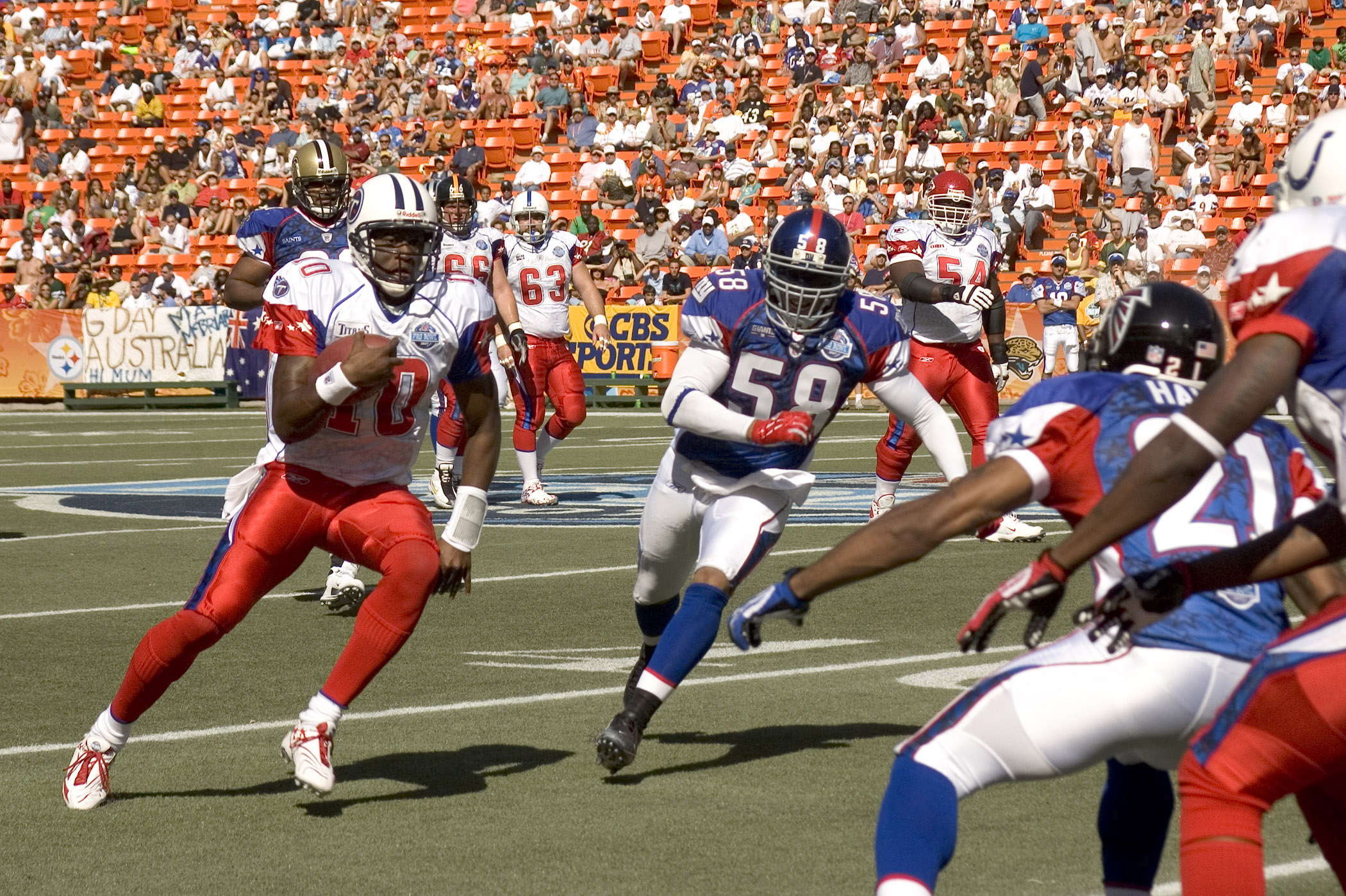
Antonio Pierce (#58) attempts to tackle Vince Young (#10) in the 2007 Pro Bowl

The Washington Redskins signed him as an undrafted free agent in 2001. He played in all 16 games as a rookie, with eight starts. He recorded 52 tackles, one sack, and one interception during his rookie campaign. The interception came against Jake Plummer. Over the next two seasons, Pierce played sporadically, recording only 18 and 15 tackles respectively, during the 2002 and 2003 seasons.

It was not until the 2004 season, his fourth in the league, that he played a full season, upon replacing the injured Micheal Barrow. That season, Pierce logged a career-high 114 tackles, 95 of them solo. He also had one forced fumble, one sack, and two interceptions, including a pick off Ken Dorsey returned 76 yards for a touchdown.

=== New York Giants ===
The New York Giants signed Pierce on March 3, 2005, to start at middle linebacker. He became the captain of the defense, and in 13 games, Pierce notched 100 tackles, 80 of them solo, two interceptions, and one forced fumble returned for a touchdown. His 2005 season ended early as he suffered a leg injury, against the Philadelphia Eagles, and missed the final three regular season games as well as the Giants' only postseason game, a 23–0 loss to the Carolina Panthers.

In 2006, Pierce recorded a career-high 138 tackles (109 solo), a sack, an interception, and defended eight passes. Pierce was named as a first alternate for the Pro Bowl. He was invited to play in Hawaii after Brian Urlacher suffered a toe injury in Super Bowl XLI, and withdrew from the Pro Bowl.

In the 2007 season, Pierce was a central figure in the Giants' path to their third Super Bowl title. He made a key tackle in the first half of the NFC Championship game against the Green Bay Packers, stopping running back Brandon Jackson on a screen pass on 3rd and 8, saving a touchdown and forcing the Packers to settle for a field goal instead. The Giants would go on to win in overtime.

Pierce was released by the team on February 11, 2010.

=== Retirement ===
Following his release, Pierce announced his retirement from football on July 8, 2010. He also stated that he would then begin his career as an NFL analyst for ESPN.

== NFL career statistics ==
Legend
**Bold**	Career high

=== Regular season ===
Year	Team	Games		Tackles					Interceptions					Fumbles			
Year	Team	GP	GS	Cmb	Solo	Ast	Sck	TFL	Int	Yds	TD	Lng	PD	FF	FR	Yds	TD
2001	WAS	**16**	8	53	44	9	1.0	2	1	0	0	0	4	1	1	0	0
2002	WAS	8	1	18	13	5	0.0	0	0	0	0	0	1	0	0	0	0
2003	WAS	15	0	15	14	1	0.0	0	0	0	0	0	0	0	0	0	0
2004	WAS	**16**	**16**	114	87	27	1.0	3	**2**	**94**	**1**	**78**	5	1	**2**	2	0
2005	NYG	13	13	100	80	20	**2.5**	7	**2**	41	0	24	**11**	1	**2**	**12**	**1**
2006	NYG	**16**	**16**	**139**	**109**	**30**	1.0	**10**	1	6	0	6	9	1	**2**	0	0
2007	NYG	**16**	**16**	102	76	26	1.0	8	1	28	0	28	8	1	**2**	0	0
2008	NYG	15	15	95	72	23	1.5	5	0	0	0	0	2	**2**	0	0	0
2009	NYG	9	9	55	40	15	1.0	4	0	0	0	0	3	1	1	3	0
		124	94	691	535	156	9.0	39	7	169	1	78	43	8	10	17	1

=== Playoffs ===
Year	Team	Games		Tackles					Interceptions					Fumbles			
Year	Team	GP	GS	Cmb	Solo	Ast	Sck	TFL	Int	Yds	TD	Lng	PD	FF	FR	Yds	TD
2006	NYG	1	1	7	5	2	0.0	0	0	0	0	0	0	0	0	0	0
2007	NYG	**4**	**4**	**25**	**22**	**3**	0.0	0	0	0	0	0	**1**	0	0	0	0
2008	NYG	1	1	10	7	**3**	0.0	0	0	0	0	0	0	0	0	0	0
		6	6	42	34	8	0.0	0	0	0	0	0	1	0	0	0	0

== Coaching career ==
=== High school ===
On February 7, 2014, Pierce was named the head coach at national powerhouse Long Beach Polytechnic High School, replacing Raul Lara, who stepped down as the head coach of the program after 13 seasons. After an 11–2 first season, the Jackrabbits struggled under Pierce, missing the playoffs for the first time in 36 years in his second season at the helm. The struggles continued in 2016 and 2017, with the program failing to reach double digit wins in both years and losing by multiple scores in the playoffs.

=== Arizona State ===
On December 21, 2017, Pierce announced his resignation as head coach and was named linebackers coach at Arizona State University. After two seasons as the Sun Devils' linebackers coach, Pierce was promoted to co-defensive coordinator alongside Marvin Lewis. On January 20, 2021, Pierce was elevated to be the sole defensive coordinator at ASU after sharing the role with Marvin Lewis during the 2020 season. He resigned during an NCAA recruiting violation investigation prior to 2022 season. In August 2023, ASU announced a self-imposed bowl ban, hoping to lessen further penalties resulting from the ongoing investigation.

==== NCAA suspension ====
Following Pierce's resignation, the NCAA investigation continued, eventually determining that Pierce was the, "ringleader in orchestrating the recruiting violations" at ASU, and that Pierce, "used his position of authority to pressure staff members into engaging in violations, often by instilling fear that they would lose their jobs if they did not follow his orders". This included ordering an assistant to commit recruiting tampering to attempt to land a transfer not in the transfer portal, and refusing to cooperate with the investigation. Pierce's actions were described as a "scheme" and involved Pierce taking individuals to a gentleman's club as part of recruiting visits. The NCAA levied an 8 year show-cause penalty against Pierce; should an NCAA school hire Pierce prior to 2032, he would be suspended for the entire first season of his return. In a statement regarding the penalties, ASU president Michael M. Crow declared the university to be, "disappointed and embarrassed by the actions of certain former football staff members who took advantage of a global pandemic to hide their behavior."

=== Las Vegas Raiders ===
In 2022, Pierce was hired by the Las Vegas Raiders as their linebackers coach under head coach Josh McDaniels.

On October 31, 2023, Pierce was named the interim head coach of the Raiders following the firing of head coach Josh McDaniels. He named Aidan O'Connell as the starting quarterback for the rest of the season on November 1, benching Jimmy Garoppolo. On November 5, 2023, Pierce made his head coaching debut against the New York Giants, for whom he had previously played. The Raiders won the game 30–6, a season high in points for the Raiders at that point.

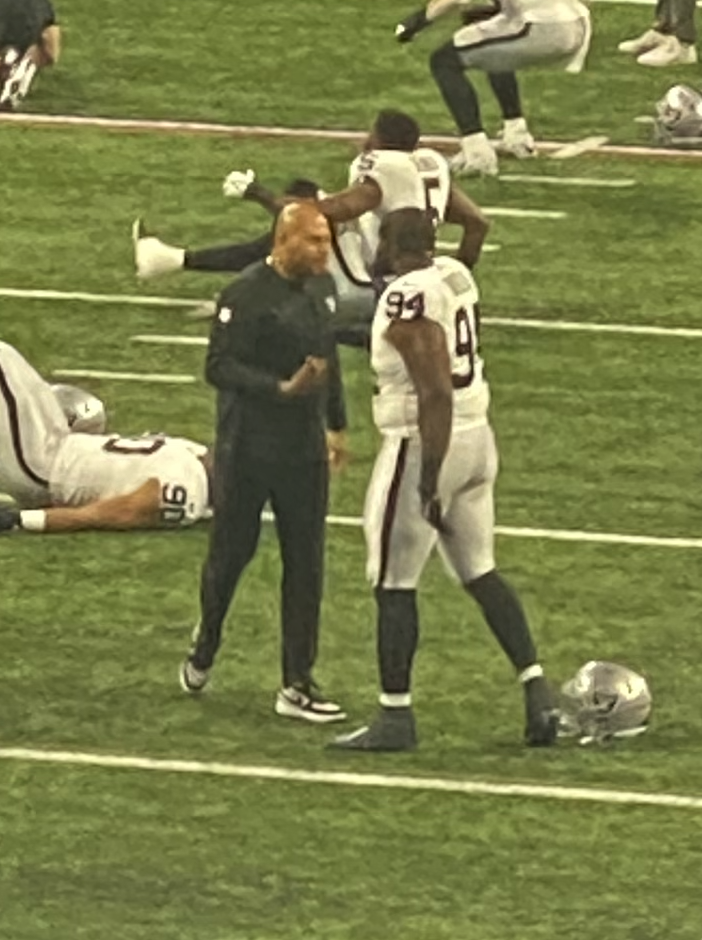
Antonio Pierce meets with Matthew Butler prior to a 2023 game against the Indianapolis Colts

On December 14, 2023, the Raiders defeated the Los Angeles Chargers 63–21, scoring the most points in franchise history. A week later, on Christmas Day, the Raiders recorded their first win over the Kansas City Chiefs since 2020.

The Raiders were eliminated from playoff contention on New Year's Eve, following a 23–20 loss to the Indianapolis Colts.

On January 19, 2024, the Raiders officially named Pierce the 23rd head coach in franchise history.

On January 7, 2025, Pierce was fired by the Raiders, after finishing 4–13 in 2024. Pierce finished his tenure in Las Vegas with a 9–17 (.346) record.

== Head coaching record ==
=== High school ===
Year	Team	Overall	Conference	Standing	Bowl/playoffs
Long Beach Poly Jackrabbits () (2014–2017)
2014	Long Beach Poly	11–2	6–0	1st	
2015	Long Beach Poly	4–6	3–3	4th	
2016	Long Beach Poly	7–4	6–0	1st	
2017	Long Beach Poly	9–3	6–0	1st	
Long Beach Poly:		31–15	21–3		
Total:		31–15			
National championship Conference title Conference division title or championship game berth

=== NFL ===
Team	Year	Regular season					Postseason			
Team	Year	Won	Lost	Ties	Win %	Finish	Won	Lost	Win %	Result
LV*	2023	5	4	0	.556	2nd in AFC West	—	—	—	—
LV	2024	4	13	0	.235	4th in AFC West	—	—	—	—
Total		9	17	0	.346		0	0	.000	

* Interim head coach

== Personal life ==
Pierce is married to Jocelyn and is the father of seven. He has resided in Palos Verdes Estates, California. His father, Cleo Burrows, is from Bermuda.

Inspired by his own experiences growing up in Compton, it has become Pierce's mission to improve the quality of life for the youth in the Long Beach/Compton area. For several years, Pierce has offered a free football camp for underprivileged youths.

In 2006, Pierce became the spokesperson for Giants Academy—a program for inner city youth geared toward helping these children succeed despite obstacles in their life. He is also involved in the "Read Across America" program where he reads to children whose parents are undergoing treatment for chemical dependency at the Odyssey House in Harlem.

In 2007, Pierce received the "United Way Man of the Year" award and was honored by the Catholic Diocese for his support of the community.

While playing for the Giants in 2008, he was a resident of Monroe Township, Middlesex County, New Jersey.

Pierce was honored at the 2008 ESPY awards along with the Giants.

=== Plaxico Burress incident ===
Pierce was present when teammate Plaxico Burress negligently shot himself in the thigh at the Latin Quarter Night Club in New York City on November 28, 2008. Police say that Pierce drove Burress to the hospital and then returned home with the gun in the glove compartment of his car. The police impounded Pierce's SUV to search for blood and gunpowder residue. Burress was charged with, and ultimately pleaded guilty to, criminal possession of a weapon; however Pierce was not indicted on any charges. On August 3, 2009, Pierce was cleared of all criminal charges stemming from the incident. He was represented in the matter by notable NYC criminal defense attorney, Michael F. Bachner.

=== Broadcasting ===
Pierce served as a communications intern on The Howard Stern Show on May 7, 2008. He stated he would like to pursue a career in broadcasting after his NFL career. Near the end of the day's show he asked to stay for the remainder of the week, which Stern agreed to.

In 2025, Pierce joined CBS Sports as an analyst on the network’s streaming Sunday pregame show, The NFL Today+.

== See also ==
- History of the New York Giants (1994–present)
