= Marsh peg =

Ice hockey goal anchoring system

Marsh Pegs is a goal anchoring system for ice hockey designed by Fred Marsh. The pegs have been used by the NHL since 1991.

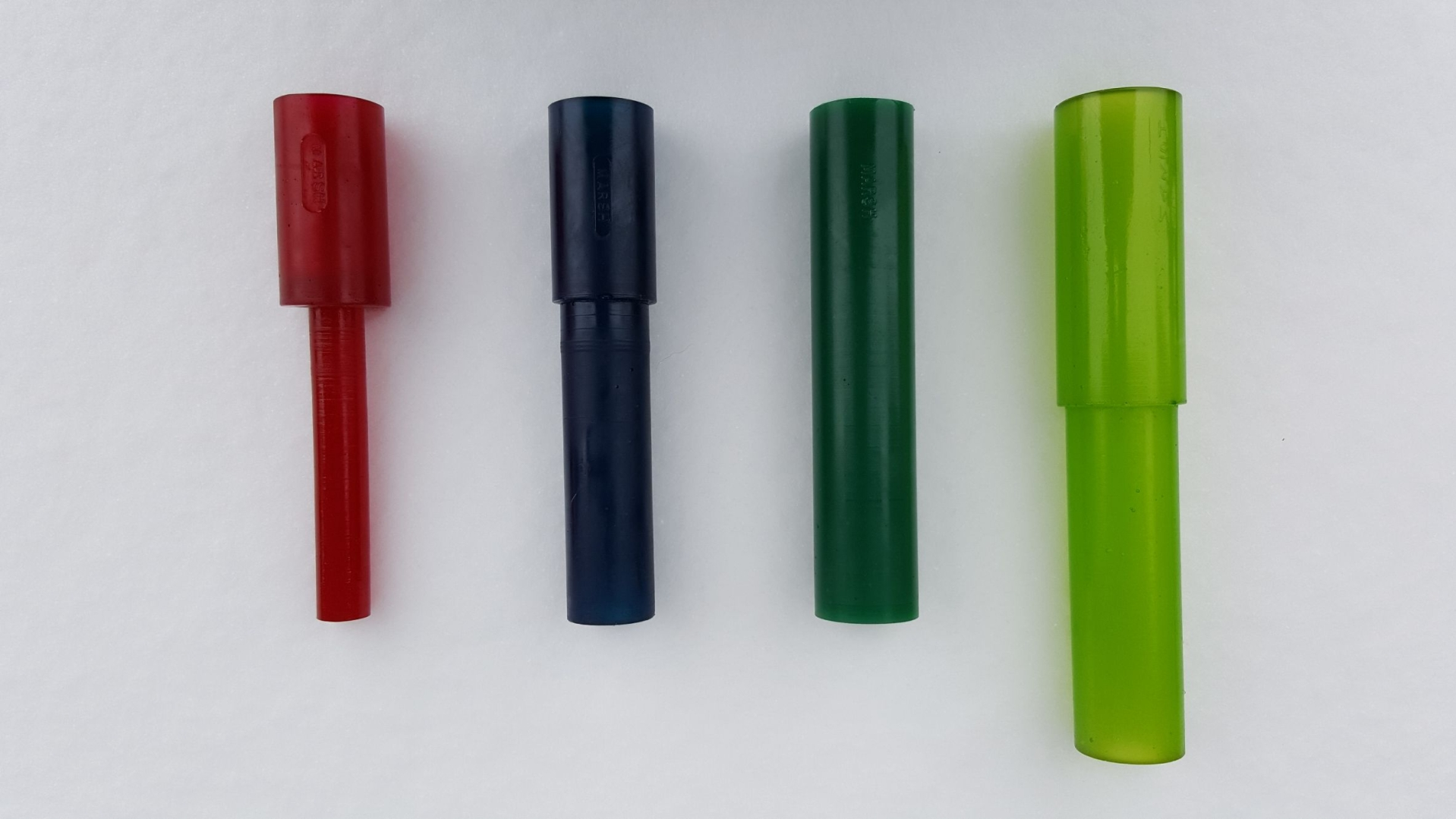
Various sizes of Marsh pegs

== History ==
Fred Marsh (1934-2016) was a Canadian who worked as a Zamboni driver at various hockey arenas throughout western Canada.

Marsh invented the pegs in the 1980s, aiming to design a product that was both flexible enough to absorb shock when a player hit the net, yet strong enough to keep the net in place. The pegs were first used in Moose Jaw and Saskatoon, in Saskatchewan, Canada, as well as Kitimat, in British Columbia before spreading throughout the WHL.

In 1991, the NHL made Marsh Pegs the standard. They have been used in the Winter Olympics since 1998 and also in World Cup games.

== Recognition ==
In 2000, Marsh won the Ernest C. Manning Innovation Award for his invention. After his death in 2016, Marsh was mentioned on the television show Hockey Night in Canada by Don Cherry.

== Controversy ==
Steven Stamkos broke his right leg after colliding with a net in a 2013 match between Tampa Bay and the Boston Bruins. Some players claimed that the net came off the moorings too easily. Marsh disagreed, insisting that "the net reacted the way it should," and that the overhead replay showed that the goalpost had been dislodged prior to Stamkos' leg colliding with the net.
