= Two Man Advantage =

- Origin: Merrick, New York
- Genres: Hardcore punk
- Years active: 1997–2025
- Members: Drunk Bastard; Skate; Captain; Snapshot; Coach; Myk; Rookie
- Past members: Teemu Heineken; Amstel Fuhr
- Website: Official website

Two Man Advantage was an American ice hockey themed punk rock group, from Merrick, New York, on Long Island. They met via Beer-League hockey and formed the band in 1997. Their shows are very wild and can be intimidating for first time viewers. The entire band wears customized Two Man Advantage hockey jerseys on stage, while Drunk Bastard wears a homemade wrestling mask and Captain wears a retro composite goalie mask. Their songs are very fast and are almost always about either hockey or beer.

In the year 2001, a documentary was made about the band called 69 Minutes of Fame. It was shot while the band was on a nine-day tour with the band Phil A. Sheo With the Goods. New York based film maker, Mark Foster, joined Two Man Advantage on the road with his video camera and edited his footage into a 45 minutes short which introduces the viewer to the band. The film explores their personalities, their day jobs, and their love of hockey. They are also known for being the only band to ever get beaten up by one person.

The band achieved some degree of notoriety in 2004 for a legal entanglement with the Zamboni Company over the song "Zamboni Driving Maniac". The band received a cease and desist letter from Zamboni, alleging that the band's song did not mesh with the company's public image. Many songs pay homage to the 1980s New York Islanders, and the Nassau Veterans Memorial Coliseum. After 28 years, the band decided to call it quits playing their last show in October 2025 at the Amityville Music Hall on Long Island.

== Members ==
=== Current ===
- Spag, AKA Drunk Bastard (formerly Bud Tkachuk):: Vocals
- Rob, AKA Skate :: Vocals/Guitar
- Jeff, AKA Captain :: Guitar
- Jeff, AKA Snapshot :: Bass
- Aaron, AKA Coach :: Drums
- Mike, AKA MYK :: Metallization
- John, AKA Rookie :: Crowd Instigator, Live Bait

=== Former ===
- Mark, AKA Teemu Heineken :: Bass
- Harry, AKA Amstel Fuhr :: Drums

== Discography ==
- Demo (self-released cassette - out-of-print) 1997
- Live on Crucial Chaos (self-released cassette - out-of-print) 1998
  - live set from appearance on WNYU, recorded April 2, 1998
- The Loiterers/Two Man Advantage split 7-inch with The Loiterers (1998, Crapfit Records)
- Mad Cow Dizeaze 182/Two Man Advantage split 7-inch with Mad Cow Dizeaze 182 1998
- Drafted (CD (1998, Royally Records)
  - remastered and re-released with bonus tracks on Drug Front Records in 2012
- Don't Label Us CD (2001, Go Kart Records 078)
- Live at CBGB (self-released CD) 2002
- Supreme Commander/Two Man Advantage split 7-inch with Supreme Commander (2006, Basement Records)
- South of Canada (2008, Rodent Popsicle Records)
- Dynasty (2012, Drug Front Records)
- Blackout Shoppers/Two Man Advantage split 7-inch with Blackout Shoppers (2013, Sexy Baby Records)

=== Compilation appearances ===
- Introducing Bill free with issue of Under the Volcano punk zine (1998)
- Scene Report CD (2000, Triple Crown Records)
- Terror Firmer Soundtrack CD (October 31, 2000, Go Kart Records)
- Go Kart vs. The Corporate Giant Vol. 3 CD (2002, Go Kart Records)
- NY/CT Hardcore Connection CD (2013, United Riot Records)
