= Frank Zamboni =

American inventor and engineer (1901–1988)

- Born: Frank Joseph Zamboni Jr. January 16, 1901; Eureka, Utah, U.S.
- Died: July 27, 1988 (aged 87); Long Beach, California, U.S.
- Occupations: Businessman, inventor
- Known for: Invention of ice resurfacer and founder of Zamboni Company

Frank Joseph Zamboni Jr. (/zæmˈboʊni/, Italian: [dzamˈboːni]; January 16, 1901 – July 27, 1988) was an American businessman and inventor whose most famous invention is the modern ice resurfacer, with his surname being registered as a trademark for these devices.

== Early life ==
Zamboni was born in 1901 in Eureka, Utah, to Italian immigrants. His parents soon bought a farm in Lava Hot Springs, Idaho near Pocatello, Idaho, where he grew up. At age 15, he dropped out of ninth grade to assist on the farm and work as a mechanic. In 1920, the family moved to the harbor district of Los Angeles, where Frank's older brother George operated an auto repair shop. Frank attended a trade school in Chicago for one year, he and his younger brother Lawrence opened an electrical supply business in 1922 in the Los Angeles suburb of Hynes (now part of Paramount, California). The following year he married and eventually had three children, a son and two daughters. In 1927, he and Lawrence added an ice-making plant and entered the block ice business.

== Paramount Iceland ==
In 1939, seeing little future in the ice block business, the Zamboni brothers, along with a cousin, Pete Zamboni, used their excess refrigeration equipment to make an ice rink. Completed in January 1940, Iceland Skating Rink opened as one of the largest rinks in the country, with 20,000 square feet (1,900 m^{2}) of ice. Originally, the facility was an open-air rink, but, due to the warm and dry Southern California weather, a dome was added a few months later. The rink used a system of underfloor piping to flood the surface with a mixture of water and chemicals to produce the ice sheet. The pipes caused rippling, but Frank devised a way to eliminate the issue, making the rink very popular. A patent for his innovation was obtained in 1946.

The rink remained in the family until it was sold to the LA Kings, AEG, and American Sports Entertainment Company (ASEC) organizations in 2022. The rink has since been remodeled and rebranded as LA Kings Iceland.

== Making the Zamboni ice resurfacer ==
After his rink opened in 1940, Frank Zamboni worked to develop a machine to resurface the ice. At the time, the process took 90 minutes and required five employees. In 1947, Zamboni introduced a machine that enabled one person to resurface the rink in 15 minutes. In 1949 he applied for a patent, which was granted as U.S. Patent No. 2,642,679 titled "Ice Rink Resurfacing Machine" on June 23, 1953. The machine used a sharp-edged blade to shave the surface of the ice, collect the shavings, wash the ice, and spread a thin coat of fresh water onto the surface. The initial machine included a hydraulic cylinder from an A-20 attack plane, a chassis from an oil derrick, a Jeep engine, a wooden bin to catch the shavings, and a series of pulleys. Zamboni's son Richard said, "It took him nine years. One of the reasons he stuck with it was that everyone told him he was crazy." Zamboni did not expect to produce more of his ice resurfacing machines, but he expanded the operation when he received two orders from figure skater Sonja Henie after she visited his rink, followed by an order from the Chicago Blackhawks.

In 1950, Frank Zamboni established the Frank J. Zamboni & Co. in Paramount, California, to build and sell the machines. In the early 1950s, he built them on top of Jeep CJ-3Bs, then on stripped Jeep chassis from 1956 through 1964.

== Market and popularity ==
Frank J. Zamboni & Company, established in Paramount, California, began manufacturing the Zamboni ice resurfacer and quickly became the leading producer in the field. By the late 1960s, the company had built its 1,000th machine, added a second plant in Brantford, Ontario, and expanded internationally by opening a marketing office in Switzerland. The machines, originally powered by Volkswagen Cabriolet engines, gained widespread recognition, including from notable customers like Charles Schulz, who owned a personal ice rink and featured the Zamboni in Peanuts comic strips.

The Zamboni became a fixture at hockey games, often drawing positive attention from spectators. According to Zamboni's son Richard, some ice rink executives were concerned that spectators preferred to watch the Zamboni instead of buying concessions. Enthusiasm for the machines led to the creation of a fan club at Michigan Tech University and a race horse named Zamboni.

The company remained under family ownership after Frank Zamboni’s death in 1988, with his descendants continuing operations at both the original Paramount site and a second facility in Brantford, Ontario. In addition to ice resurfacers, Zamboni held several patents, including one for a machine developed for Monsanto to remove moisture from artificial turf, remove paint stripes from the same surfaces, and roll up and lay down turf in domed stadiums. His final invention, in 1983, was an automatic edger to remove ice buildup from the edges of rinks. The company’s success and continued presence in the market reflect Zamboni’s long-lasting influence on ice sports infrastructure. Though the term Zamboni was (and remains) trademarked by his company, it is sometimes generically used for any brand of ice resurfacing machine.

== Death and legacy ==
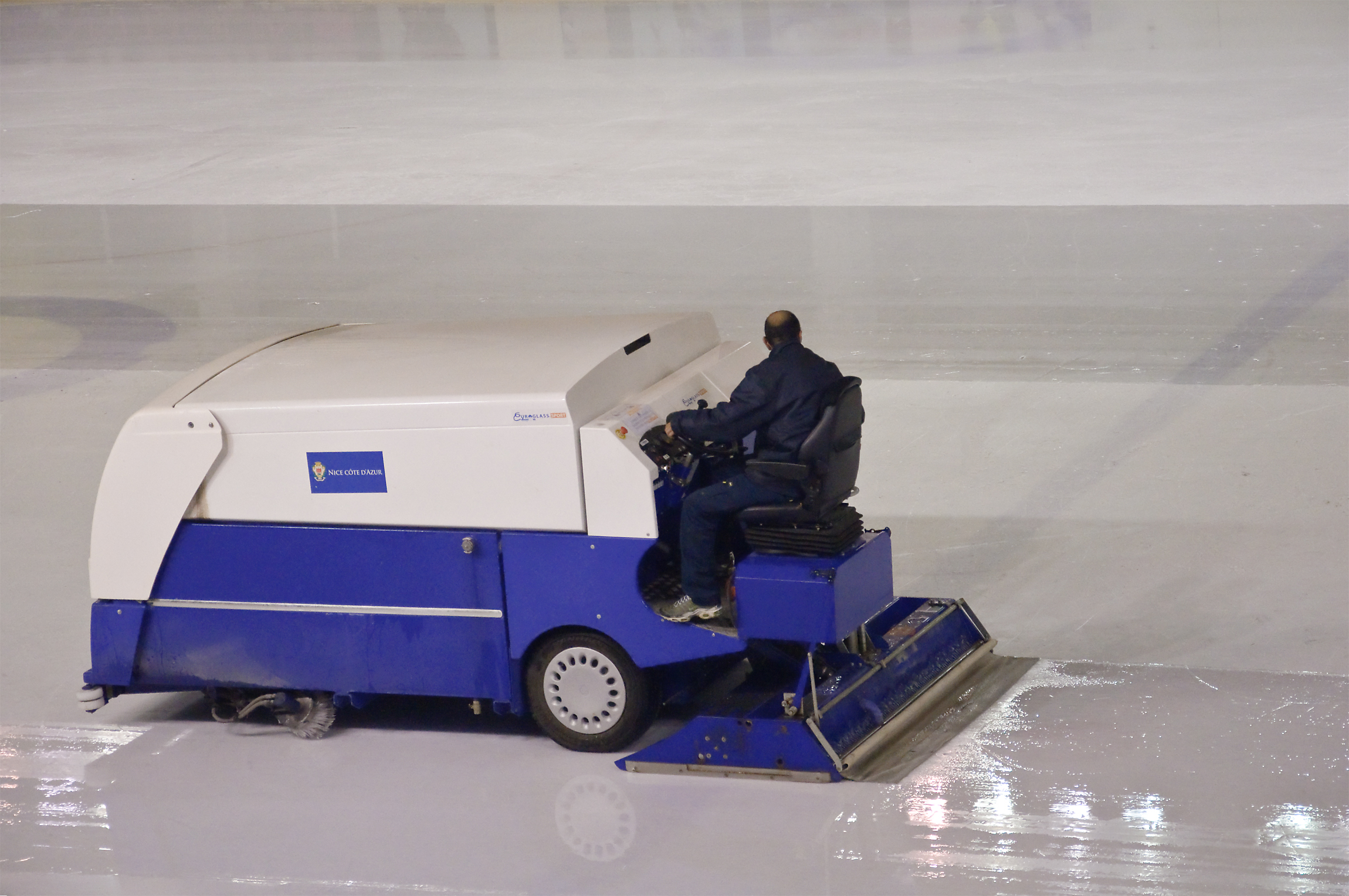
Zamboni's invention of the ice resurfacer; he created it in 1949.

Frank Zamboni died of cardiac arrest at Long Beach Memorial Hospital on July 27, 1988, at the age of 87, about two months after his wife's death. He also had lung cancer. The Zamboni company has sold more than 10,000 units of its signature machine, the Zamboni Ice Resurfacer, commonly known as a "Zamboni." The 10,000th machine was delivered to the Montreal Canadiens in April 2012 for use at the Bell Centre. The company is still owned and operated by the Zamboni family. His remains are buried at All Souls Cemetery in Long Beach.

Zamboni was inducted into the Ice Skating Institute's Hall of Fame in 1965, and he was awarded an Honorary Doctorate of Engineering from Clarkson University in 1988. Frank was posthumously inducted into the NEISMA Hall of Fame in 1988, the United States Figure Skating Hall of Fame in 2000, the World Figure Skating Hall of Fame in 2006, the National Inventors Hall of Fame in 2007, the U.S. Hockey Hall of Fame in 2009, and into the United States Speed Skating Hall of Fame in 2013.

Despite his career in ice rinks, Zamboni "didn’t even like to skate" according to Smithsonian magazine.

The Frank J. Zamboni School, in Paramount is named after him.

== Patents ==
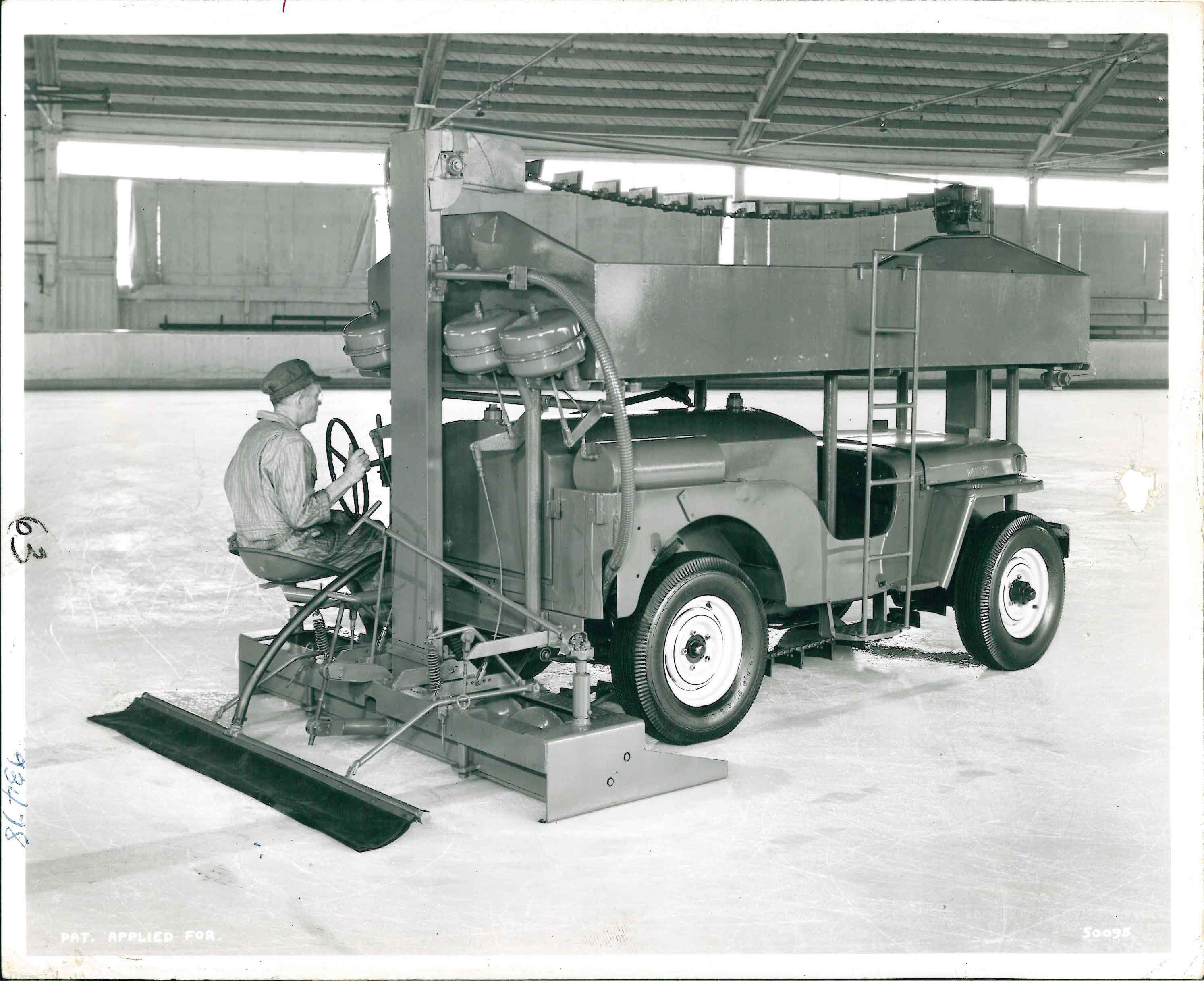
Patent Case File No. 2,642,679

All patents are in the United States. Early patents:

- 1,655,034: "Adjustable Reaction Resistance (Electrical)", issued on Jan 3, 1928
- 1,710,149: "Reactance Coil (Electrical)", issued on Mar 11, 1930
- 1,804,852: "Circuit Controlling Reactance Coil (Electrical) Date Issued: May 12, 1931
- 2,411,919: "Ice Rink Floor", issued on Dec 3, 1946
- 2,594,603: "Refrigerated Liquid Storage Tank", issued on Apr 29, 1952
- 2,738,170: "Refrigerated Milk Storage Tank and Pasteurizer, issued on Mar 13, 1956

Ice resurfacers:

- 2,642,679: "Ice Resurfacer", issued on Jun 23, 1953
- 2,763,939: "Ice Resurfacer", issued on Sep 25, 1953
- 3,044,193: "Ice Resurfacer", issued on Jul 17, 1962
- 3,622,205: "Down Pressure", issued on Nov 23, 1971

Ice resurfacer-related products:

- 4,372,617: "Ice Edger", issued on Feb 8, 1983

Machine for Astro-Turf:

- 3,736,619: "Turf Water Remover", issued on Jun 5, 1973
- 3,835,500: "Turf Water Remover", issued on Sep 17, 1974
- 4,069,540: "Turf Paint Remover", issued on Jan 24, 1978
- 4,084,763: "Turf Handling Machine", issued on Apr 18, 1978
