= South Gate, California =

City in California, United States

- City
- California Avenue in South Gate

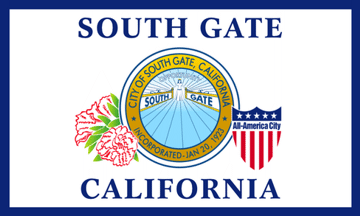
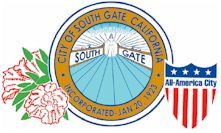
- Flag Seal
- Nickname: "Azalea City"
- Interactive map of South Gate, California
- Location within the Los Angeles metropolitan area Location within southern California Location within California Location within the United States
- Coordinates: 33°56′39″N 118°11′42″W
- Country: United States
- State: California
- County: Los Angeles
- Incorporated: January 20, 1923

Government
  - Mayor: Maria Davila
  - Vice Mayor: Joshua Barron
  - City Council: Maria del Pilar Avalos; Al Rios; Gil Hurtado

Area
  - Total: 7.36 sq mi (19.05 km^{2})
  - Land: 7.24 sq mi (18.74 km^{2})
  - Water: 0.12 sq mi (0.30 km^{2}) 1.59%
- Elevation: 115 ft (35 m)

Population (2020)
  - Total: 92,726
  - Rank: 90th in California
  - Density: 12,820/sq mi (4,948/km^{2})
- Time zone: UTC-8 (PST)
  - Summer (DST): UTC-7 (PDT)
- ZIP Code: 90280
- FIPS code: 06-73080
- GNIS feature ID: 1652795
- Website: www.cityofsouthgate.org

South Gate is a city in Los Angeles County, California, United States, with 7.4 square miles (19 km^{2}). It is located 7 miles (11 km) southeast of Downtown Los Angeles. South Gate is part of the Gateway Cities region of southeastern Los Angeles County.

The city was incorporated on January 20, 1923, and it became known as the "Azalea City" when it adopted the flower as its symbol in 1965. As of the 2020 census, the city had a population of 92,726, making it the 19th largest in the county.

In 1990, South Gate was one of ten U.S. communities to receive the All-America City Award from the National Civic League.

== History ==
=== Indigenous history ===
Before the Spanish Colonial Era, the area that became South Gate was in the traditional cultural territory of the Gabrielino. Gabrielino villages or archaeological sites are rumored to have existed at the South Gate Park and at the old City Hall site at the intersection of Post Street and Victoria Avenue. The village of Tajauta was located on the border of South Gate, Lynwood, and Watts.

=== Spanish colonial era ===
Among the early Spanish settlers was one of California's first families, the Lugos. The Lugo land grant encompassed a great part of what is now the City of South Gate.

While Francisco Lugo was stationed at Mission San Antonio de Padua near Salinas, California, his first California son, Antonio Maria Lugo was born in 1775. That son became Don Antonio Maria Lugo, Spanish aristocrat and soldier, who settled on 30,000 acres (120 km^{2}) of land that encompasses what is now the City of South Gate. In 1810, the King of Spain formally granted the land to Lugo as a reward for his and his father's military service. Around a century later, the area around the southern gate of the ranch became the City of South Gate.

=== Early Industrial Development ===
Before the end of the 1870s, much of the original land grant had been replaced by tracts of 40-acre (160,000 m^{2}). By 1880, cattle raising had been replaced by agriculture as the most important local industry. During the years between 1910 and 1940, most of the agricultural land was replaced by homes and factories. Early developers accelerated the suburbanization of what was then called South Gate Gardens by subdividing the land into small plots and selling the empty plots to blue-collar workers, many of which were Okies. A majority of early homes were built individually as plot owners used "sweat equity rather than cash to construct their own homes" and the local economy relied heavily on urban agriculture.

By 1940, South Gate had evolved into a major industrial hub, with over 35 factories producing chemicals, machinery, furniture, roofing materials, and more. This industrial boom continued into the mid-20th century, and by 1976, over 400 industries were operating in the city.

The Firestone Tire and Rubber Company opened a plant in December 1927 on what was then a bean field at Alameda and Firestone. The facility began operations in mid-1928 and expanded multiple times in subsequent decades, providing significant employment and shaping local land use patterns.

The plant later closed and the property was sold for redevelopment in the mid-1980s.

=== Recent and Future Development ===
A notable environmental and developmental event occurred when the Cooper Drum Company, which operated from 1976 to 1992, was designated a Superfund site by the EPA in 2001 due to hazardous chemical contamination in soil and groundwater near residential areas.

In the late 2010s, the city shifted focus to mixed-use development. The Azalea Regional Shopping Center, a 376,000 sq. ft retail and community hub built on a formerly vacant 32-acre site, opened at the corner of Firestone Boulevard and Atlantic Avenue.

In 2019, the Tweedy Boulevard Specific Plan was adopted under the City’s General Plan 2035 to revitalize Tweedy Mile as the city’s historic main street. The plan introduced urban mixed-use zoning categories as well as Industrial Flex and Neighborhood Medium zones to encourage pedestrian-oriented, mixed-use development along the corridor.

=== Tweedy family ===
R.D. Tweedy was born in 1812 in Illinois and came to California by ox-drawn cart in 1852. The family was large, and several generations have lived in this city. The family members bought some 2,000 acres (8.1 km^{2}) of the land on which much of South Gate was built. The downtown business district is known as the Tweedy Mile.

=== Incorporation ===
The city was named in 1918 after the South Gate Gardens on the Cudahy Ranch. The city was incorporated five years later, in 1923, using the shortened form of the name. The name refers to the city's being south of Los Angeles. The population of that time was 2500 people. On May 19 1927, A.J Schoby was selected as the first mayor.

== Geography ==
According to the United States Census Bureau, the city has a total area of 7.4 square miles (19 km^{2}), of which 7.2 square miles (19 km^{2}) is land and 0.1 square miles (0.26 km^{2}) is water, the latter comprising 1.59% of the total area.

The Los Angeles River runs through the eastern part of South Gate.

South Gate has a semi-arid Mediterranean climate with mild winters and hot, dry summers. The average annual precipitation is 14.8 inches (380 mm) per year with most occurring between November and April. Temperatures range from a low of 40 °F (4 °C) to a high of 110 °F (43 °C). The average daily temperatures range from 54 °F (12 °C) to 73 °F (23 °C).

== Demographics ==
Historical population
Census	Pop.	Note	%±
1930	19,632		—
1940	26,945		37.3%
1950	51,116		89.7%
1960	53,831		5.3%
1970	56,909		5.7%
1980	66,784		17.4%
1990	86,284		29.2%
2000	96,375		11.7%
2010	94,396		−2.1%
2020	92,726		−1.8%
U.S. Decennial Census; 1860–1870 1880-1890; 1900 1910 1920; 1930 1940 1950; 1960 1970 1980; 1990 2000 2010; 2020

South Gate first appeared as a city in the 1930 U.S. census as part of the now defunct San Antonio Township.

=== Racial and ethnic composition ===
South Gate city, California – Racial and ethnic composition Note: the US Census treats Hispanic/Latino as an ethnic category. This table excludes Latinos from the racial categories and assigns them to a separate category. Hispanics/Latinos may be of any race.
Race / Ethnicity (NH = Non-Hispanic)	Pop 1980	Pop 1990	Pop 2000	Pop 2010	Pop 2020	% 1980	% 1990	% 2000	% 2010	% 2020
White alone (NH)	25,243	11,803	5,755	3,233	2,285	37.80%	13.68%	5.97%	3.42%	2.46%
Black or African American alone (NH)	1,151	1,139	632	585	884	1.72%	1.32%	0.66%	0.62%	0.95%
Native American or Alaska Native alone (NH)	301	170	157	110	119	0.45%	0.20%	0.16%	0.12%	0.13%
Asian alone (NH)	1,004	1,105	725	647	609	1.50%	1.28%	0.75%	0.69%	0.66%
Pacific Islander alone (NH)	1,004	1,105	51	69	31	1.50%	1.28%	0.05%	0.07%	0.03%
Other Race alone (NH)	134	340	71	147	338	0.20%	0.39%	0.07%	0.16%	0.36%
Mixed race or Multiracial (NH)	x	x	315	163	420	x	x	0.33%	0.17%	0.45%
Hispanic or Latino (any race)	38,951	71,727	88,669	89,442	88,040	58.32%	83.13%	92.00%	94.75%	94.95%
Total	66,784	86,284	96,375	94,396	92,726	100.00%	100.00%	100.00%	100.00%	100.00%

=== 2020 census ===
As of the 2020 census, South Gate had a population of 92,726. The population density was 12,812.8 inhabitants per square mile (4,947.0/km^{2}).

100.0% of residents lived in urban areas, while 0.0% lived in rural areas. The census reported that 99.7% of the population lived in households, 0.3% lived in non-institutionalized group quarters, and 0.1% were institutionalized.

There were 24,577 households, of which 48.1% had children under the age of 18 living in them. Of all households, 49.8% were married-couple households, 9.0% were cohabiting couple households, 14.7% had a male householder with no spouse or partner present, and 26.5% had a female householder with no spouse or partner present. About 11.2% of households were one-person households, and 4.7% had someone living alone who was 65 years of age or older. The average household size was 3.76, and there were 20,679 families (84.1% of all households).

The age distribution was 24.6% under the age of 18, 11.1% aged 18 to 24, 29.1% aged 25 to 44, 23.8% aged 45 to 64, and 11.3% who were 65 years of age or older. The median age was 34.0 years. For every 100 females, there were 96.6 males, and for every 100 females age 18 and over, there were 93.4 males.

There were 25,084 housing units at an average density of 3,466.1 units per square mile (1,338.3 units/km^{2}), of which 24,577 (98.0%) were occupied. Of these, 45.2% were owner-occupied, and 54.8% were occupied by renters. The homeowner vacancy rate was 0.5%, and the rental vacancy rate was 1.6%.

=== 2023 ACS 5-year estimates ===
In 2023, the US Census Bureau estimated that the median household income was $71,315, and the per capita income was $24,567. About 11.5% of families and 13.2% of the population were below the poverty line.

=== 2010 census ===
The 2010 United States census reported that South Gate had a population of 94,396. The population density was 12,837.6 inhabitants per square mile (4,956.6/km^{2}). The racial makeup of South Gate was 47,645 (50.5%) White, 3,209 (3.4%) Non-Hispanic White, 890 (0.9%) African American, 878 (0.9%) Native American, 732 (0.8%) Asian, 99 (0.1%) Pacific Islander, 40,624 (43.0%) from other races, and 3,528 (3.7%) from two or more races. There were 89,442 residents of Hispanic or Latino ancestry, of any race (94.8%).

The Census reported that 94,308 people (99.9% of the population) lived in households, 16 (0%) lived in non-institutionalized group quarters, and 72 (0.1%) were institutionalized.

There were 23,278 households, out of which 13,805 (59.3%) had children under the age of 18 living in them, 13,183 (56.6%) were opposite-sex married couples living together, 4,706 (20.2%) had a female householder with no husband present, 2,261 (9.7%) had a male householder with no wife present. There were 1,879 (8.1%) unmarried opposite-sex partnerships, and 134 (0.6%) same-sex married couples or partnerships. 2,292 households (9.8%) were made up of individuals, and 996 (4.3%) had someone living alone who was 65 years of age or older. The average household size was 4.05. There were 20,150 families (86.6% of all households); the average family size was 4.24.

There were 29,374 residents (31.1%) under the age of 18, 11,298 (12.0%) aged 18 to 24, 28,039 (29.7%) aged 25 to 44, 19,062 (20.2%) aged 45 to 64, and 6,623 (7.0%) who were 65 years of age or older. The median age was 29.4 years. For every 100 females, there were 96.4 males. For every 100 females age 18 and over, there were 93.9 males.

There were 24,160 housing units at an average density of 3,285.7 per square mile (1,268.6/km^{2}), of which 10,658 (45.8%) were owner-occupied, and 12,620 (54.2%) were occupied by renters. The homeowner vacancy rate was 1.5%; the rental vacancy rate was 3.6%. 46,665 people (49.4% of the population) lived in owner-occupied housing units and 47,643 people (50.5%) lived in rental housing units.

=== 2015–2019 estimates ===
During 2015–2019, South Gate had a median household income of $52,321, with 17.2% of the population living below the federal poverty line. For people ages 25 and over, 56.7% had a high school degree or higher while 9.4% had a bachelor's degree or higher.

=== Religion ===
There are approximately 40 churches located in the City representing a variety of religious denominations. 53.4% of the people in South Gate, CA are religious. 37.0% are Catholic; 6.7% are Protestant; 1.6% are members of the Church of Jesus Christ of Latter-day Saints; 5.2% are another Christian faith; 1.1% are Jewish; 1.1% are "an eastern faith"; 0.7% are Muslim.

=== Demographics history ===
Mexican and Salvadoran are the most common ancestries in South Gate.

=== Homelessness ===
According to the Greater Los Angeles Homeless Count conducted by the Los Angeles Homeless Services Authority, South Gate reported 340 homeless individuals in 2022. Subsequent counts estimated a decrease to 112 in 2023, 134 in 2024, and 83 in 2025.

== Economy ==
As of June 2009, California's EDD lists the unemployment rate in South Gate as 14.4%, with negative job growth. The California State Board of Equalization lists South Gate's sale tax rate as 10.75%. The income per capita is $11,566, which includes all adults and children. The median household income is $41,064.

As of April 1, 2009, the City of South Gate imposed a 10.25-percent sales tax (statewide plus local supplementary, which is now 9.75% with the expiration of the temporary tax increase under Proposition 1A), which matches Pico Rivera's sales tax rate as the highest in the State of California.

On July 9, 2009, the South Gate City Council held a special meeting where a resolution was adopted declaring a fiscal emergency for the City of South Gate.

According to the United States Census Bureau, in 2023, the median household income was $71,315, the per capita income was $24,567, and the poverty rate stood at 13.2%.

== Government ==
In the United States House of Representatives, South Gate is in California's 44th congressional district, which has a Cook PVI of D+32 and is represented by Democrat Nanette Barragán.

South Gate is represented in the California State Senate by Democrat Lena Gonzalez (33rd District), and in the California State Assembly by Democrat Jose Solache (62nd District).

=== Local government ===
63.10% of the people in South Gate are registered as Democrats, with 35.60% registered as Republican. The remaining 1.30% are independent.

The City Council consists of five persons elected at large by the residents of South Gate. These Council members serve a four-year term and establish the governing policies and procedures for the city. The Mayor is selected on an annual, rotating basis from among the Council Members. The current City Council consists of:

- Mayor Maria R. Davila (2003— )
- Vice Mayor Joshua Barron (2022— )
- Councilmember Maria Del Pilar Avalos (2020— )
- Councilmember Gil Hurtado (2005–17, 2020— )
- Councilmember Al Rios (2017— )

City Clerk
The City Clerk in South Gate is an elected position that serves a four-year term. As the official record keeper for the city, the City Clerk is responsible for maintaining all central and legal files, preparing City Council meeting agendas and minutes, conducting municipal elections and assisting the Los Angeles Registrar-Recorder with voter registration. Yodit Glaze is the City Clerk of South Gate.

City Treasurer
Jose De La Paz was elected City Treasurer of South Gate in November 2022.

City Manager
The City Manager is appointed by the City Council to carry out its policies and ensure that the community is served in a responsive manner. Responsible for oversight of all City operations and the delivery of public services, the City Manager works closely with the city's departments in developing policy recommendations and responding to directives of the City Council. Rob Houston was appointed City Manager by the City Council on December 1, 2023.

==== Finances ====
South Gate currently is one of the lowest in taxing its residents in the south east area of Los Angeles. It is one of the few cities that does NOT have a Utility Users Tax (UUT). Most cities have an additional tax added to the sales tax for utilities such as gas, water, electricity, phone, cell phone, cable, and internet. Most cities range from +/- 4%-11%. South Gate is 0%.

==== Corruption and election fraud ====
South Gate's political history in the early 2000s has been characterized by political observers and editors as having elements of "Third World politics".

From 2001 to 2003, then-city treasurer Albert Robles, along with three accomplices on the city council, accepted bribes and in turn gave taxpayer money to friends and relatives to perform city contracts. The three accomplices formed a majority of the five-member city council, so they could effectively run the city as they wanted. For example, in 2002, Robles was arrested on felony threat charges but was appointed by the city council to the deputy city manager position and had his legal bills covered by the city. The city council gave themselves a 2000% pay raise, and cut the pay of City Clerk Carmen Avalos by 90%, after she complained about corruption and election fraud in the city to the California Secretary of State.

On January 28, 2003, voters recalled Robles along with his political allies, Mayor Xochitl Ruvalcaba, Vice Mayor Raul Moriel, and councilwoman Maria Benavides.

Robles was convicted of bribery in July 2005. In November 2006 he was sentenced to 10 years in federal prison, ordered to pay the city of South Gate $639,000 in restitution, and was immediately put into custody.

In March 2006, Rudy Navarro, who was elected to replace Albert Robles as city treasurer, was caught making a false statement on his biography as posted on the city's official web site. He claimed that he earned a degree from San Diego State University, when he actually had not completed all the requirements.

=== County representation ===
In the Los Angeles County Board of Supervisors, South Gate is in the Fourth District, represented by Janice Hahn.

The Los Angeles County Department of Health Services operates the Whittier Health Center in Whittier, serving South Gate.

== Infrastructure ==
=== Roads ===
- Interstate 710
- Imperial Highway
- Firestone Boulevard
- Century Boulevard

=== Buses ===
South Gate is served by Metro Local and Metro Rapid buses. The City of South Gate operates the Get Around Town Express (GATE) to provide local service.

=== Light Rail ===
South Gate will be served by the planned Southeast Gateway Line (formerly known as the West Santa Ana Branch Transit Corridor), a Los Angeles Metro Rail light rail project currently in development. The line will run between Downtown Los Angeles and Artesia, with a station planned in South Gate near Atlantic Avenue and Patata Street. Construction is expected to begin in 2025, with service projected to start in 2035.

=== City parks ===
South Gate offers ten city parks for the enjoyment of its citizens.

- South Gate Park covers a total of 96.8 acres (392,000 m^{2}), and is the largest park within the city limits. This park is used to carry out most of the Parks and Recreation Department's community programs. There are a total of six different facilities at this park, some of which can be rented out for a variety of events. These facilities include the Municipal Auditorium, Girls Club House, 9-hole Par 3 Golf Course, Senior Recreation Center, Swim Stadium, and Sports Center. The site also features athletic fields, outdoor basketball courts, two playgrounds, tennis courts, a skate park, several shaded areas for picnics, and a Jr. Hockey Rink. The park closes at 10:00 pm.
- Hollydale Regional Park covers 56.0 acres (227,000 m^{2}), has a playground, tennis courts, a baseball field, soccer fields, a picnic area (groups of 50+ by reservation only), and an Equestrian Center that is also available for rent. The park closes at sunset.
- Urban Orchard Park covers 30.0 acres (121,000 m^{2}), has a playground, orchard with hundreds of fruit trees, a wetland, a garden, walking path, native landscaping and a mile extension of Los Angeles River Trail. The park close at sunset.
- Cesar Chavez Park covers 9.0 acres (36,000 m^{2}), has two playgrounds and a pergola. No reservation is needed for picnics. The park closes at sunset.
- Circle Park covers 4.0 acres (16,000 m^{2}), and is a neighborhood park. It has a small playground, a ball field and a grass area. The park closes at sunset.
- Hollydale Community Park covers 2.2 acres (8,900 m^{2}), it has a playground, outdoor basketball courts, and a Community Center. The park closes at 10:00pm.
- State Street Park covers 0.8 acres (3,200 m^{2}) and only has a grass fields. is a neighborhood park, No reservation needed for picnics. The park closes at sunset.
- Gardendale Tot Lot covers 0.45 acres (1,800 m^{2}), and is a neighborhood park. It has a playground and a small grass area. The park closes at sunset.
- Triangle Park covers 0.3 acres (1,200 m^{2}), has a pergola, a seating area, a bike rack, and a drinking fountain. The park closes at sunset.
- Stanford Park covers 0.19 acres (770 m^{2}) and is a neighborhood park. It has a playground and a small grass area. The park closes at sunset.

== Education ==
Schools located in South Gate include: 21 public (13 elementary, three high schools, three charter schools, two middle schools, one span school and one continuation high school) and two parochial schools. Adult education classes are conducted at both the junior and senior high schools. The city is also served by three community colleges (Compton, Cerritos and East Los Angeles—main campus and South Gate satellite) and three California State Universities (Dominguez Hills, Long Beach and Los Angeles.)

=== Public schools ===
Most of South Gate is served by the Los Angeles Unified School District public school system. A small section of South Gate is served by the Paramount Unified School District and another by Downey Unified School District.

==== Los Angeles Unified School District ====
===== LAUSD primary schools =====
- Bryson Avenue Elementary School (opened 1931, partially a Math, Science, Technology magnet school)
- Independence Elementary School (opened 1997)
- Liberty Boulevard Elementary School (opened 1932)
- Madison Elementary School (opened 2005)
- Montara Avenue Elementary School (opened 1988)
- San Gabriel Avenue Elementary School (opened 1920)
- San Miguel Avenue Elementary School (opened 1989, partially a math and science magnet school)
- Stanford Avenue Elementary School (1-5, opened 1924)
- Stanford New Primary Center (K, opened 2004)
- State Street Elementary School (opened 1932)
- Tweedy Elementary School (Originally Opened 1931) (opened 1950)
- Victoria Avenue Elementary School (opened 1925)
- Willow Avenue Elementary School (opened 2012)

===== LAUSD charter schools =====
- Firestone (opened 2010)
- Aspire Gateway (opened 2010)
- Valiente College Preparatory Charter School ( 2015)
- KIPP Corazon (2017)

===== LAUSD middle schools =====
- International Studies Learning Center
- South Gate Middle School (opened 1941)
- South East Middle School (opened 2004)
- Southeast DREAMS Magnet School (opened 2018)

===== LAUSD high schools =====
- South Gate High School (opened 1932)
- South East High School (opened 2005)
- Legacy High School

When South East High School opened, within the City of South Gate, the school's attendance boundary took land formerly zoned to South Gate High School, Huntington Park High School, and David Starr Jordan High School.

===== LAUSD span school =====
- International Studies Learning Center (opened in 2004)

LAUSD continuation high school

- Odyssey Continuation High School

===== Paramount Unified School District =====
- Hollydale School (K-8)
- Paramount High School

==== Private schools ====
===== Private primary schools =====
- Lollypop Lane Preschool and Kindergarten
- Redeemer Lutheran School
- Saint Helen Elementary School

===== Private high schools =====
- Academia Betel

=== Colleges and universities ===
- South Gate Satellite Campus, East Los Angeles College

=== Public libraries ===
County of Los Angeles Public Library operates:

- Leland R. Weaver Library (4035 Tweedy Boulevard )
- Hollydale Library (12000 South Garfield Avenue )

== Notable people ==
- Arleen Auger, opera singer; born in South Gate
- Don Bandy, pro football player
- Don Buchla, inventor of Buchla music synthesizer
- Cypress Hill, hip hop/rap group
- Mark Gonzales, pro skateboarder
- Lee Greenwood, country music recording artist; born in South Gate
- Doug Griffin, Major League Baseball player
- Doug Harvey, Hall of Fame baseball umpire
- Victor Henry, UFC Fighter
- Don Horn, pro football player
- Dave Huppert, Major League Baseball player and coach
- Lou Kimzey, publisher and movie producer
- Bob Klein, professional football player; tight end for NFL's Los Angeles Rams
- Mellow Man Ace, rapper
- Dick Nen, Major League Baseball player
- Walter Perez, actor
- Dick Rand, Major League Baseball player
- Lorenzo Romar - professional basketball player, college basketball coach
- Pete Rozelle, Commissioner of National Football League, 1960–1989
- Glenn Seaborg, Nobel Prize winner
- Niki Sullivan, an original member of Buddy Holly's Crickets.
- Dave Lombardo, Drummer for Slayer

== See also ==
- Albert Robles
- Seaborg Home
- South Gate High School
- South East High School
- Legacy High School
- International Studies Learning Center
