= Paramount Unified School District =

School district in California, United States

Location
- Paramount, California United States

District information
- Superintendent: Ruben Frutos

Other information
- Website: PUSD District website

Paramount Unified School District is a school district headquartered in Paramount, California, United States.

The district serves the city of Paramount, and portions of Bellflower, Compton, Lakewood, Long Beach, and South Gate, with eleven elementary schools, five middle schools, one comprehensive high school (Paramount High School), and a number of other educational facilities.

== Schools ==
High schools:

- Paramount High School (two campuses in Paramount, one for freshmen and one for upperclassmen)
- Buena Vista High School (Lakewood)

K-8 schools:

- Hollydale School (South Gate)

Middle schools:

- Alondra Middle School (Paramount)
- Jackson 4-8 Middle School (Paramount)
- Paramount Park Middle School (Paramount)
- Zamboni Middle School (Paramount)

Elementary schools:

- Collins Elementary School (Long Beach)
- Gaines Elementary School (Paramount)
- Jefferson Elementary School (Paramount)
- Keppel Elementary School (Paramount)
- Lincoln Elementary School (Paramount)
- Los Cerritos Elementary School (Paramount)
- Mokler Elementary School (Paramount)
- Roosevelt Elementary School (Paramount)
- Tanner Elementary School (Paramount)
- Wirtz Elementary School (Paramount)
