= Zamboni Company =

American manufacturing company

Frank J. Zamboni & Company, Inc.
- Type: Private
- Founded: 1950; 76 years ago
- Founder: Frank Zamboni
- Headquarters: Paramount, California, United States
- Area served: Worldwide
- Key people: Richard F. Zamboni (Chairman and President)
- Website: Official website

Frank J. Zamboni & Company is an American manufacturer of ice resurfacing equipment based in Paramount, California. Frank J. Zamboni developed the first ice resurfacing machine in 1949, and started the Zamboni Company in 1950. Zamboni /zæmˈboʊni/ is an internationally registered trademark.

The machines are made in Paramount, California, and in Brantford, Ontario.

== History ==
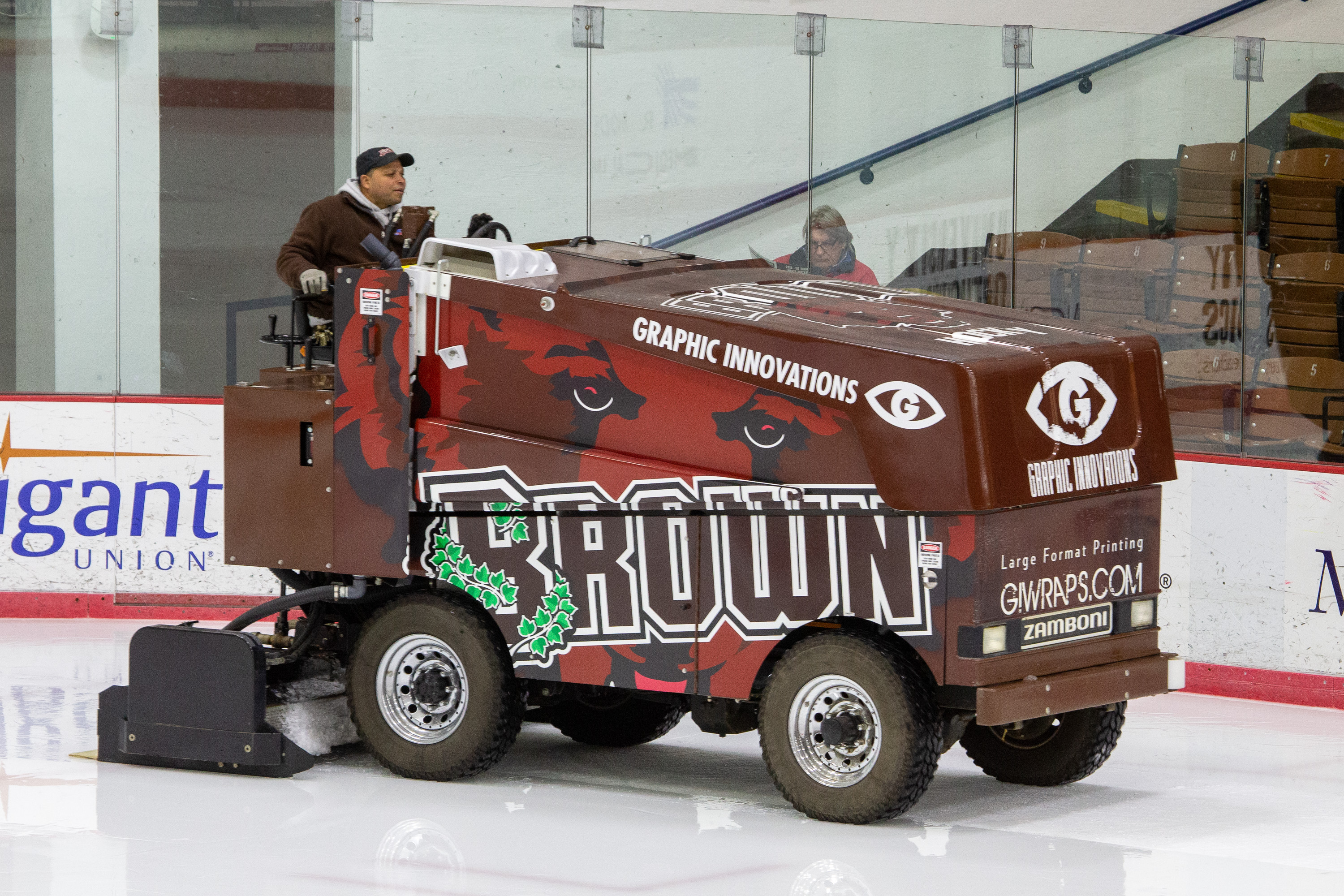
A Zamboni brand ice resurfacer clears the rink at Meehan Auditorium, Brown University.

The first ice-resurfacer was the brainchild of Frank J. Zamboni, who was originally in the refrigeration business. He provided services to businesses such as dairy farms and produce vendors. Zamboni created a plant for making ice blocks that could be used in refrigeration techniques. As the demand for ice blocks waned, Zamboni looked for another way to capitalize on his expertise with ice.

In 1939, Zamboni created the Iceland Skating Rink in Paramount, California. To resurface the skating rink, three or four workers scraped, washed, and squeegeed the ice. Then they added a thin layer of water to make fresh ice. This process was extremely time consuming, and Zamboni wanted to find a more efficient method.

From 1942 to 1947, Zamboni tried, fruitlessly, to develop a vehicle that could cut down on resurfacing time. In 1947, Zamboni decided on a machine that shaved, washed, and squeegeed the ice. He mounted this machine on an army surplus vehicle chassis. A blade mounted on the machine shaved the ice, which then received a thin layer of water to create a smooth sheet of ice. The prototype had a tank that held the ice shavings, which it carried to the tank via a conveyor belt. This machine was powered by a Jeep engine and transmission. Zamboni abandoned this model in late 1947 because of deficiencies with the blade and handling.

A new machine used another army surplus vehicle chassis. This machine had four wheel drive and front and back wheel steering. By 1949, "'The Model A Zamboni Ice-Resurfacer' became a working reality." Further modification to the Model A included the addition of a wash water tank and a cover for the snow-holding tank. The front and back steering feature was removed in favor of front-wheel steering because the machine constantly got wedged against the boards.

The Model A did not have the visual appeal of modern ice-resurfacers. A journalist from the Brantford Expositor observed that "[t]he original [Model A] looks like the offspring of a field tractor and a warehouse crate." In May 1949, Frank Zamboni filed a patent application for the Model A. In 1953, after more than four years, U.S. Patent No. 2,642,679 finally issued. The first built Model A Zamboni, used for the Iceland rink, is now on permanent display at the still-operating rink.

Zamboni's next resurfacer was the Model B. This machine differed significantly from the Model A. Instead of using a Jeep engine and transmission, Zamboni decided to build the necessary parts directly onto a Jeep body. Zamboni model C was also built on a Jeep body, but with more design changes. Zamboni raised the driver's position for better visibility, and increased snow-holding tank capacity.

From the late 1950s to 1964, the company made minimal changes to the ice-resurfacer design. Model C to Model F changed only slightly. The introduction of the HD series in 1964, however, represented a shift in Zamboni ice-resurfacer design. Instead of a conveyor belt moving ice shavings into the snow-holding tank, a vertical auger system did the task. Along with the vertical auger, the new model had a new hydraulic snow-dumping system. This meant that drivers no longer had to shovel the ice shavings out of the holding tank. This design has been the industry standard ever since.

== Use of brand name ==
Frank J. Zamboni & Co. has taken a strong stance against its trademark dilution, the Zamboni name being used as a genericized trademark for ice resurfacers. On March 2, 1964, Frank J. Zamboni & Co. applied for its first trademark, which was granted on May 4, 1965. This registration (Reg. No. 789,009) is for the mark "Zamboni" used in connection with "ice resurfacing machines and dump attachments therefor." Frank J. Zamboni & Co. owns several other trademark registrations covering the Zamboni mark in relation to various other goods including toys and clothing.

There is a musical group by the name of The Zambonis (who write ice hockey-themed songs) which they use under the terms of a licensing agreement from the Zamboni corporation. Another band, Two Man Advantage, was sent a cease-and-desist letter in 2004 involving its song, "Zamboni Driving Maniac", with the company claiming it "implies an unsafe activity."

== In popular culture ==
From 1980 until the strip's end, Charles Schulz often included references to Zamboni in his Peanuts comic strip. It was also mentioned by name in the TV special She's a Good Skate, Charlie Brown.

The Zamboni Company's ice resurfacing machine and Frank Zamboni were honored with a Google Doodle on January 16, 2013, for Frank Zamboni's 112th birthday. Google provided a playable doodle, where a Zamboni machine can be driven around a rink.

The video game Plants vs. Zombies has a zombie driving a Zamboni-brand ice resurfacer, called the "Zomboni" in-game. Used with permission from the "Game of the Year" re-release onward.

A 1989 episode of Cheers, entitled "Death Takes a Holiday on Ice", features the off-screen death of Carla Tortelli's ice show performing husband, Eddie LeBec, who is said to have been run-over by a Zamboni.

In 1990, the Gear Daddies recorded a song called "I Wanna Drive the Zamboni" about a person who wanted a job driving the Zamboni at the ice rink.

In the 2014 film Dumb and Dumber To, Harry (Jeff Daniels) and Lloyd (Jim Carrey) steal a modified Zamboni-brand ice resurfacer.

In the 2019 film ”Wine Country”, while playing a different paths game Catherine wishes she was a Zamboni driver as it would always be cool and she would get to have 2 hour long breaks.

The 2021 "Double Date" episode of Call Me Kat ends with Kat's mother announcing she has set up Kat on a blind date with a Zamboni driver; Kat is intrigued by that skill set.

An xkcd comic (#3234) humorously depicts a fictional “Zamboni Voyager” mission to Europa, parodying real spacecraft by suggesting the moon’s icy surface would be resurfaced like an ice rink.
