= Legacy High School (South Gate, California) =

STEAM Legacy High School

Location
- 5225 Tweedy Boulevard; South Gate, Los Angeles County, California; United States of America
- Coordinates: 33°56′29″N 118°10′43″W

Information
- Founded: 2012
- School district: Los Angeles Unified School District
- NCES School ID: 062271013133
- Principal: Wendy Monroy
- Nickname: Tigers
- Website: https://legacyhs.lausd.org/

Legacy High School, or STEAM Legacy High School , is a STEAM public school located in South Gate, California. It was ranked the 322nd best high school within California for the 2023–2024 school year by U.S. News & World Report. The school is part of and within the Los Angeles Unified School District and is affiliated with the International Studies Learning Center. As of 2023, the school currently has around 583 students. Students in the school participate in various programs such as the Water Equity Technology Program and the ELAC Early College Program.

== History ==
Plans to construct the school started in 2008 under the name South Region High School #9. On February 23, 2009, construction for South Region High School #9 was approved. The principal planned to administer the school at the time, Carla Barrera-Ortiz of the Los Angeles Unified School District, claimed the main goal of the school was to "reverse the underrepresentation of Latinos in the field of mathematics and technology". Masonry for the school was at the cost of around 3 million US dollars and construction costed around 13.5 million dollars. The school opened on August 14, 2012, in the Gateway Cities city of South Gate. On January 8, 2016, the girls' basketball team of Legacy High School won against Palisades Charter High School with a score of 65-62 for the CIF Los Angeles City Section championship. In 2019, STEAM Legacy High School won in the 2019 Horizon Grand Prix, an automotive competition in Prague, by building a prototype hydrogen vehicle.

On August 30, 2023, Varsity Head Football Coach, Steve Medina was named Week 1 - Coach of the Week by the Los Angeles Chargers. Coach Medina led an undefeated Legacy Tigers team into week 7, and finished the regular 2023-24 season at 8 - 2. This was the most successful season by any varsity team in school history, but it was overshadowed by the untimely passing of Coach Medina on November 5, 2023, when he succumbed to a long battle with kidney disease. A few weeks later, he was also posthumously awarded the Coach of the Year for Los Angeles County during a special halftime ceremony of the Chargers Sunday Night Football game versus the Baltimore Ravens on November 26, 2023 at SOFI Stadium in Inglewood, California.

On October 26, 2023, a police officer opened fire on campus at around 9:30 PDT after an SUV driver attempted to run another police officer over. The SUV then crashed into a parked car and the school was placed on lockdown.
