= Paramount High School =

Location
- West campus: 14708 Paramount Blvd; Paramount, California 90723; Senior campus: 14429 Downey Ave; Paramount, California 90723; United States

Information
- Type: Public
- Motto: "Once a Pirate, Always a Pirate"
- Established: 1953
- School district: Paramount Unified School District
- NCES District ID: 0629850
- NCES School ID: 062985004653
- Principal: Elizabeth Salcido (Senior Campus); Ebony Jordan (West Campus)
- Teaching staff: 183.83 (FTE)
- Grades: 9–12
- Enrollment: 3,547 (2023–2024)
- Student to teacher ratio: 19.30
- Colors: Maroon; White
- Athletics conference: [[Suburban Valley Conference]
- Team name: Pirates
- Newspaper: The Porthole
- Information: (562)602-6064
- Website: Senior campus website West campus website

Paramount High School is a comprehensive public high school in Paramount, California, USA. It is part of the Paramount Unified School District. The school serves students in grades 9–12 on two campuses, West Campus for 9th grade students and Senior Campus for grades 10–12. With 3,370 students enrolled for the 2025-26 school year, it is one of the largest school in the area.

Paramount USD, of which this is the sole comprehensive high school, includes all of Paramount and sections of Bellflower, Compton, Lakewood, Long Beach, and South Gate.

== History ==
Paramount High School has had a 70+ year long history as the school was established in 1953. The school originally opened due to an increase of population in the area due to the end of World War 2. Before the school had opened many people still were living in Paramount and had no home high school. The local students would have to attend Compton High School. As the school began to expand students and services available for the community, the city was falling apart. In 1982, the Rand corporation deemed the city of Paramount as one of the eight "disaster areas" in the nation. The students who went to the schools started to be affected by this, the city bounced back on there feet. The damage was already done to the local community and the students. In 2001, Paramount high school was deemed as 1:1 high school. Meaning the school is in bottom ten percent of schools in the state. This created a need for new administration, that is when ETS Pulliam got hired as the new district superintendent. By the year 2004, the scores of students at the school jumped by 49%.

== Campuses ==
- West Campus, which serves ninth grade students, located at 14708 Paramount Blvd.
- Senior Campus, which serves grades 10–12, located at 14429 Downey Ave.

== Curriculum ==
Paramount High School offers a comprehensive curriculum. A number of Advanced Placement classes are available for interested students.

== Reconstruction ==
On 2008, Paramount High School has Renovations, Modernizations, and New Constructions. The $72 Million high school program includes a new athletic stadium, field house, mini gym, academic/science classroom building, and library/media center. The first phrase of program scheduled for construction is the athletic stadium and field house. The project incorporates solar power into all new buildings.

The site was completed in 2010.

== Athletics ==
The Paramount Pirates are in the Suburban Valley Conference, along with 20 other schools such as Downey, Bellflower, Whittier and Pioneer. The Paramount boys' soccer team was 2010 Division III and State Regional Division I CIF champions. The Paramount boys' soccer team won CIF for 3 consecutive years (2010, 2011, 2012) thus given the nickname, the 3-peat champs. In 2012, they also won State Regional Champions. The Paramount wrestling team was 2011 Division VI CIF runner-up. In 2012, the Paramount boys varsity tennis won the first ever 4-peat in tennis. The recent years that tennis has won league, was in 2009, 2010, 2011, and 2012. The Pirates have also won CIF state for boys soccer in 2017.

== Notable alumni ==
- Dante Basco – actor, singer
- Timothy DeLaGhetto – actor, comedian, rapper, YouTube personality
- Charles Huerta – professional boxer
- Brian Hunter – MLB player
- Cassh Maluia – NFL player
- Leon Neal – NFL player, running back
- Antonio Pierce – NFL player, linebacker, Las Vegas Raiders Head Coach
- Roy Riegels – College football player known for his infamous "Wrong Way" run
- Rico Smith Jr. – NFL player, wide receiver
- Adán Chalino Sánchez – singer
- Jeff Sellers – MLB player
- YG – rapper (attended, but did not graduate)
- Gil Velazquez – professional baseball player
- J Boog - reggae singer/artist
