= International Studies Learning Center =

Public school in Los Angeles, California

Coordinates: 33.9414°N 118.1787°W

Location
- High school: 5225 Tweedy Blvd South Gate, California 90280; Middle school: 5220 Tweedy Blvd South Gate, California 90280

Information
- Type: Public school
- Established: 2005
- School district: Los Angeles Unified School District
- Principal: Marcos Hernandez
- Staff: 35.00 (FTE)
- Grades: 6-12
- Enrollment: 859 (2018-19)
- Student to teacher ratio: 24.54
- Colors: Hunter Green Shirt; Khaki Pants
- Mascot: Dragon
- Website: internationalstudlc.lausd.org

International Studies Learning Center (ISLC) is a "span school", meaning a combined junior and senior high school covering grades 6–12, in the Los Angeles Unified School District. A WASC accredited school, ISLC is part of the Asia Society International Studies Schools Network. It is also partnered with Foundation for California Community Colleges, Los Angeles Southwest College, and Los Angeles Trade–Technical College.

Its high school community is currently located in the Legacy High School Complex alongside VAPA and STEAM high schools in Legacy High School Complex, which opened in 2011. The middle school relocated to the newly-built middle school across from the high school, which opened in 2019.

== History ==
ISLC High school was housed inside of South East High School portion of the South East Complex. ISLC Middle school was also housed in the South East Middle School portion of the South East Complex completed in October 2005 on a 57.45-acre (232,500 m^{2}) plot of land on the site of the old General Motors plant in South Gate, California. The high school has since been relocated to Legacy High School Complex in 2011 and the middle school joined the high school in 2019, with the completion of the International Studies Middle School building across the street from the high school complex. In 2024, Marcos Hernandez became the principal at ISLC.
