= Ice resurfacer =

Machine used to resurface an ice rink

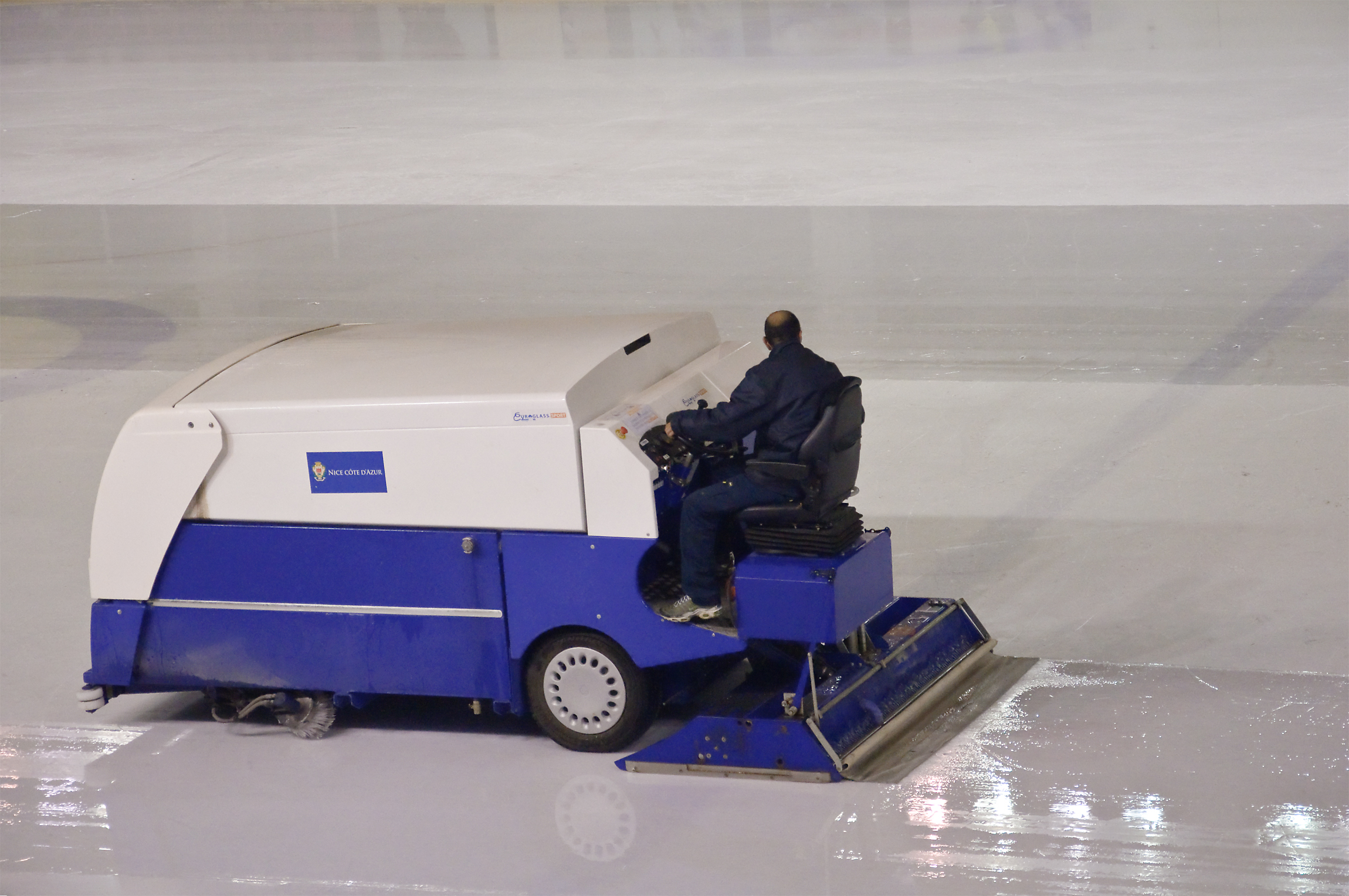
An ice resurfacer lays down a layer of clean water, which will freeze to form a smooth ice surface.

An ice resurfacer is a vehicle or hand-pushed device for cleaning and smoothing the surface of a sheet of ice, usually in an ice rink. The first ice resurfacer was developed by American inventor and engineer Frank Zamboni in 1949 in Paramount, California. As such, an ice resurfacer is often referred to as a "Zamboni" as a genericized trademark.

== History ==
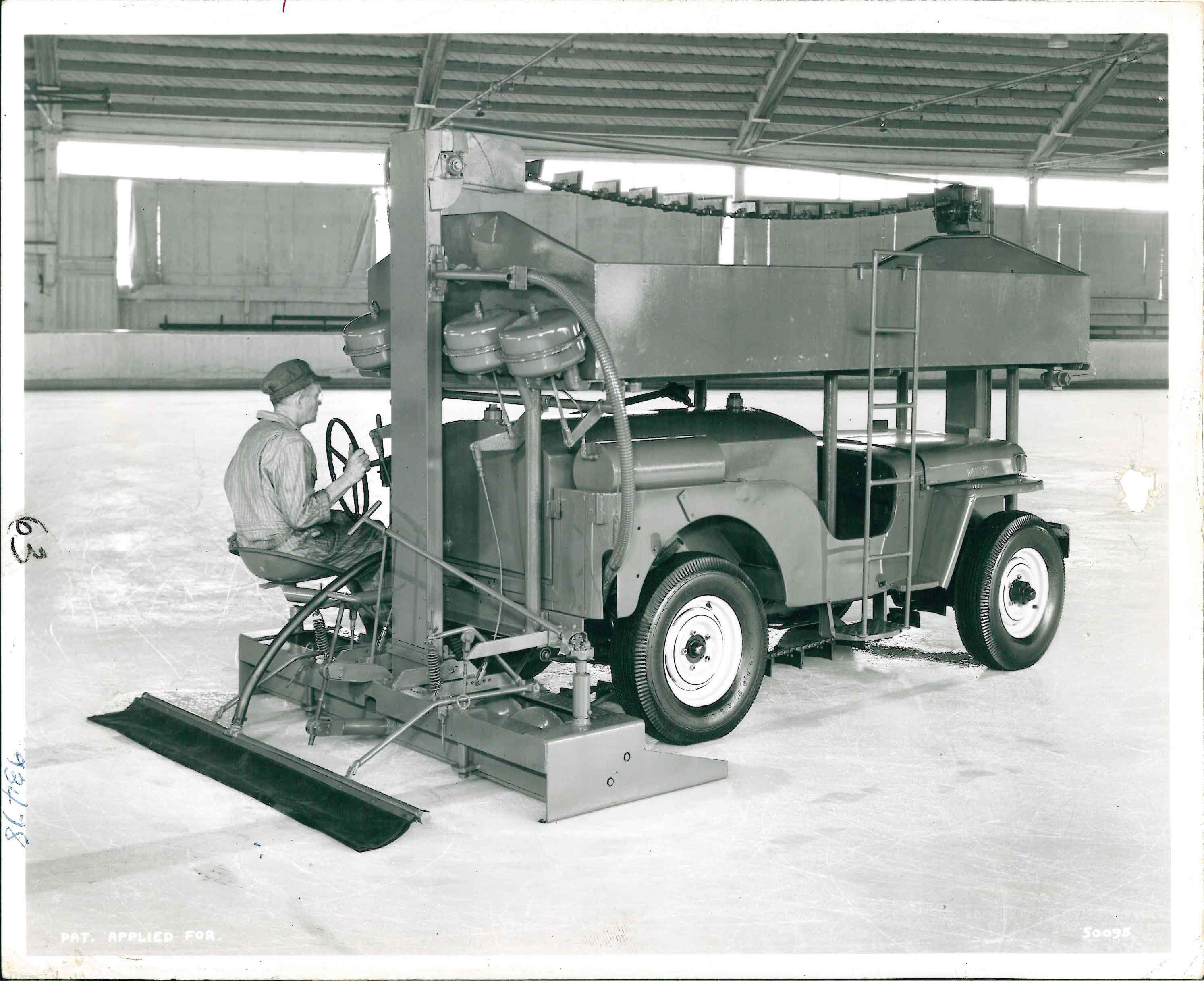
Zamboni Model B ice resurfacer mounted on a Jeep CJ chassis.

The first ice resurfacer was invented by Frank Zamboni, who was originally in the refrigeration business. He created a plant for making ice blocks that could be used in refrigeration applications. As the demand for ice blocks waned with the spread of compressor-based refrigeration, he looked for another way to capitalize on his expertise in ice production.

In 1939 Zamboni built the Iceland skating rink in Paramount, California. To resurface the skating rink, three or four workers had to scrape, wash, and squeegee the ice. A thin layer of water was then added for the fresh ice. This process was extremely time-consuming, and Zamboni wanted to find a more efficient way to resurface the ice.

Between 1942 and 1947, he dedicated his efforts to creating a vehicle that would reduce the time needed for resurfacing. In 1947 he built a machine that could shave, wash and squeegee the ice. This machine was mounted on an army surplus Willys jeep chassis. A blade was mounted on the machine, which shaved the ice; the ice then received a thin layer of water, creating a smooth sheet of ice. The prototype had a tank that held the ice shavings, which were carried to the tank via a conveyor belt. Zamboni abandoned this model in late 1947 because of deficiencies with the blade and handling.

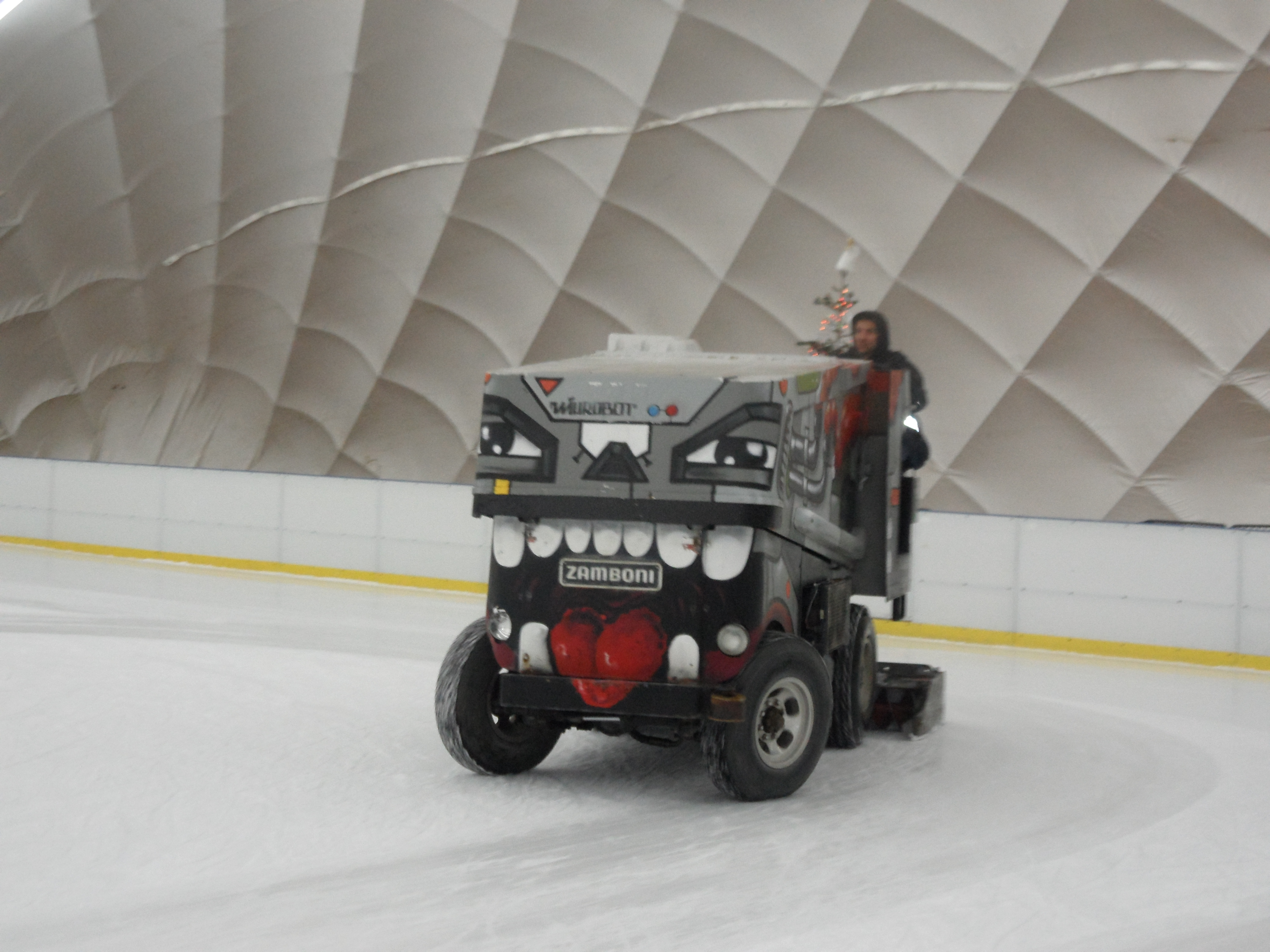
A Zamboni HD series ice resurfacer at work in Gdańsk

A new machine was developed using another army surplus vehicle chassis. This machine had four-wheel drive and all-wheel steering. By 1949 the Model A Zamboni Ice Resurfacer was developed. Further modification to the Model A included the addition of a wash water tank and a cover for the snow-holding tank (for ice shavings). The all-wheel steering feature was reduced to only front-wheel steering because the machine constantly got wedged against the boards. The Zamboni ice-resurfacer was patented in 1953.

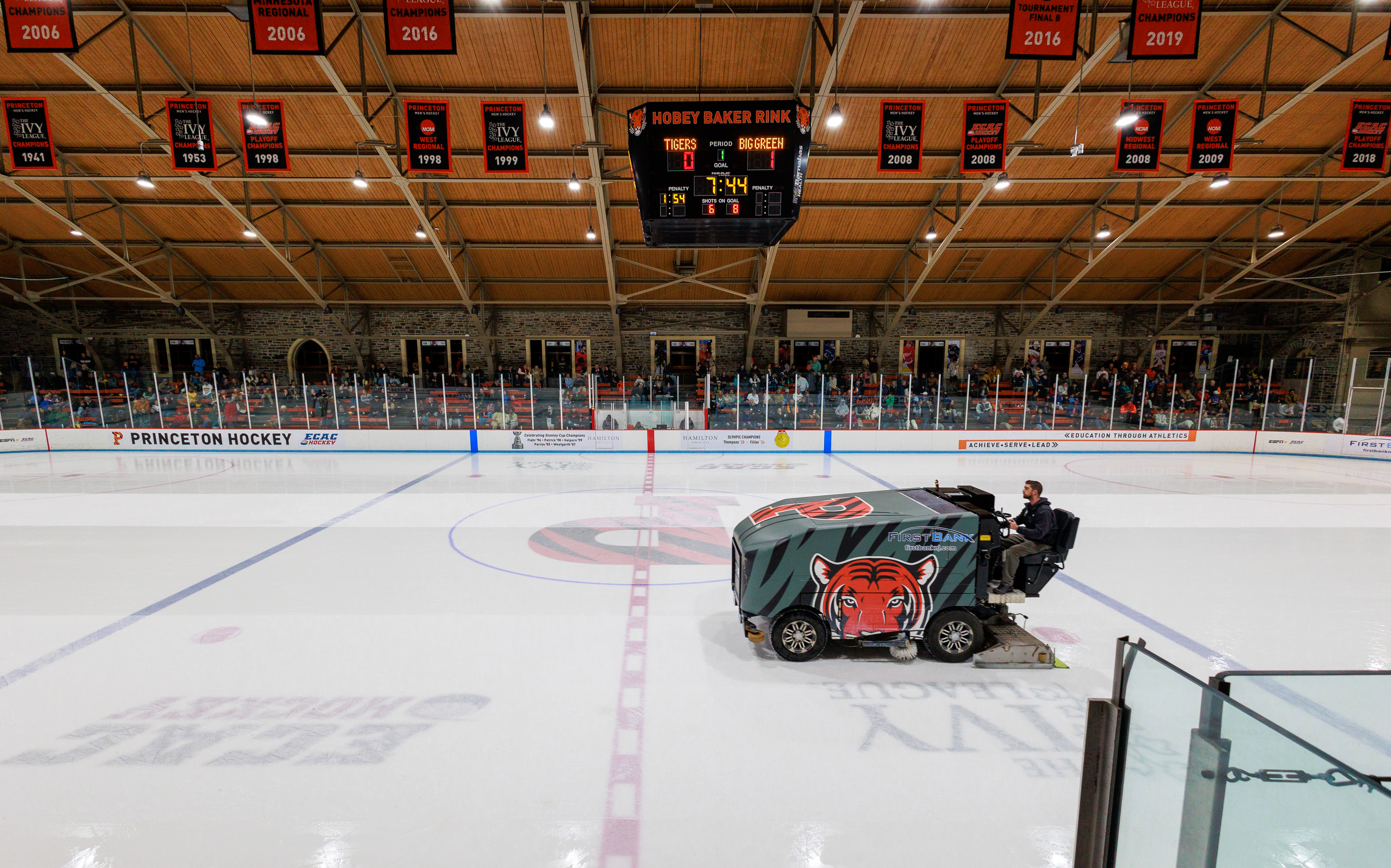
Ice resurfacer at Princeton's Hobey Baker Memorial Rink

The Model B was the next ice resurfacer made by Zamboni. The Zamboni Model C was also built on the same frame, but more design changes were applied. The driver's position was raised for better visibility, and the capacity of the snow-holding tank was increased. From the late 1950s to 1964, there were minimal changes in how the ice-resurfacers were designed. The introduction of the HD series in 1964 saw a shift in the design of the Zamboni ice resurfacers. Instead of relying on a conveyor belt system to move the ice shavings into the snow-holding tank, a vertical screw conveyor system was installed, and a new hydraulic snow-dumping system was adopted. This design has been the industry standard since it was first adopted.

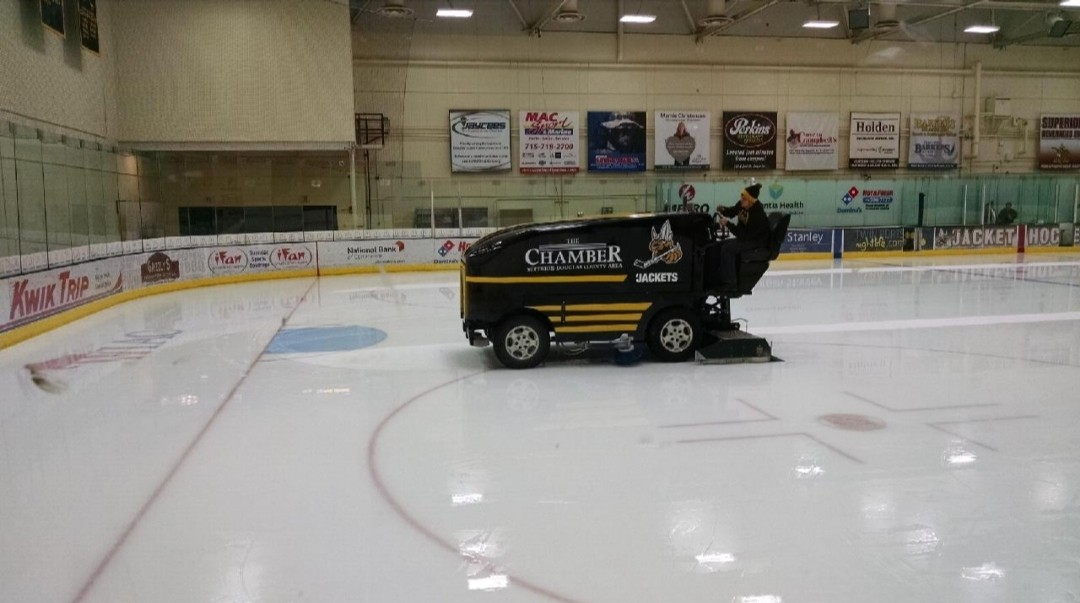
Olympia Ice Resurfacer at the University of Wisconsin - Superior

In 1967, an Elmira, Ontario-based welder named Andrew Schlupp founded the Resurfice Corporation and began producing competing models of resurfacers, including their popular Olympia line. In 1980 an Italian company, Engo Ice Arena Equipment, began producing ice resurfacers.

== Technology ==
Ice resurfacers are generally composed of a snow container, hot water tanks, a wash water tank, the conditioner, and a board brush. An internal combustion engine or electric motor of the vehicle is responsible both for propelling the resurfacer and also powering the hydraulics that control the various functions, such as lowering the conditioner or raising the snow dump.

Most of the actual resurfacing components are contained in a heavy device at the rear of the machine, known as the "conditioner". The conditioner is hydraulically lowered to the ice surface, its weight providing the friction necessary for a large, sharp blade (similar to those used in industrial paper cutters) to shave off the top layer of ice. A horizontal auger conveyor collects these ice shavings, or snow, and funnels them to a vertical auger at the center of the conditioner. The shavings are then carried upward and sprayed into a large snow container, which takes up most of the volume of the resurfacer.

The height of the blade can be adjusted by the driver, allowing deeper or shallower cuts. This is useful for keeping the ice sheet level, improving the quality of the cut, and preventing the snow container from overflowing.

Wash water can be used to further improve the quality of the ice by removing debris and snow from deep skate-blade cuts. Located directly in front of the blade, nozzles forcefully spray water into the ice surface, loosening deep debris. Runners on either side of the conditioner contain the spray, while a rubber squeegee at the rear of the conditioner allows a vacuum nozzle to pick up excess water. This water is then filtered through a screen and recirculated.

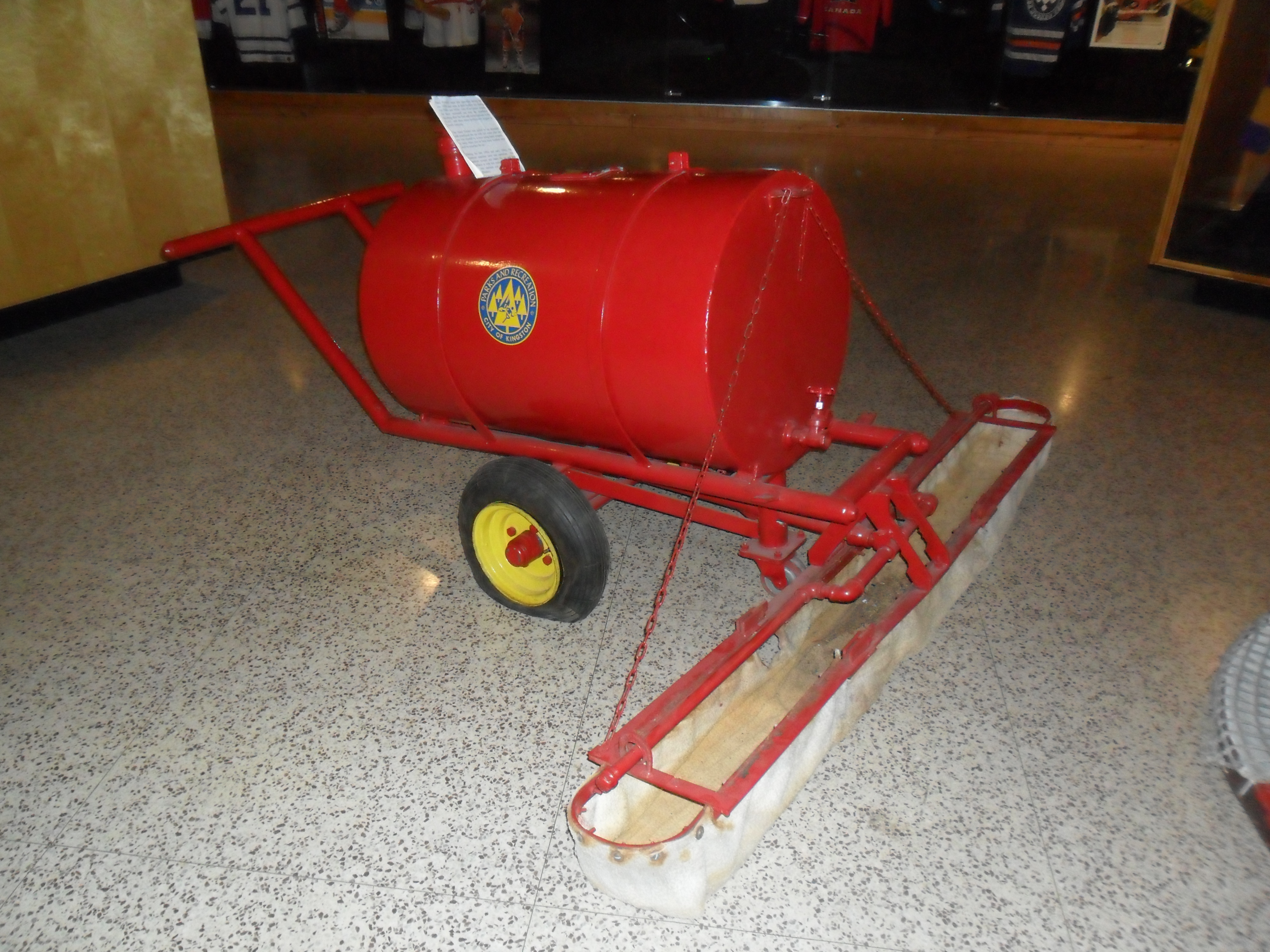
Before mechanized ice resurfacers were invented, hand flooders such as this one were pulled around the rink laying an even layer of hot water. This flooder is in the collection of the International Hockey Hall of Fame.

Finally, a layer of water is laid down to fill in the remaining grooves in the ice. The ice-making water is released through a sprinkler pipe at the rear of the conditioner, which wets the cloth towel that is dragged behind the resurfacer. The towel ensures a smooth, controlled deposition of water.

Traditionally, hot water has been used because it slightly melts the layer of ice below it, leading some operators to believe it forms a stronger bond during the freezing process because heating the water releases dissolved gases thus allowing the ice to freeze in a clearer state. It is also sometimes believed that warm water reduces the freezing time of the water due to the unproven Mpemba effect. The water used in some rinks is also filtered and treated before being used in the ice resurfacer to remove minerals or other impurities in the water. These impurities can otherwise make the ice brittle or soft, give it undesirable odors, or change the color and clarity.

Many ice resurfacers are fitted with a "board brush", a rotary brush powered by a hydraulic motor. The board brush is extended and retracted on the left side of the machine by a hydraulic arm. This allows the operator to collect ice shavings and debris that accumulate along the edge of the rink (along the kick plates below the dasher boards of the rink) where the conditioner cannot easily reach. The brush sweeps the accumulations into the path of the conditioner, which removes them from the ice. The use of a board brush can dramatically reduce the need for edging of the rink. After resurfacing the entire sheet, this process also being known as an ice cut or flood, the snow container must be emptied. Hydraulics raise one end of the container, causing the snow to spill out.

The ice around the edges of a rink also has a tendency to build up because the conditioner blade does not extend all the way to the outer edges of the conditioner and it is unwise to "ride" (drive with the conditioner touching) the dasher boards. An ice edger is a small device similar to a rotary lawn mower that is used to shave down the edges of the ice surface that the ice resurfacer cannot cut. An ice edger cannot shave ice that has an overall bowl or mushroom shape.

Smaller, cheaper machines have also been designed to provide a smooth ice surface in a manner similar to the method of a traditional resurfacer. These can be either self-propelled or pushed or pulled by the operator. Self-propelled vehicles typically incorporate the main components of a full-size ice resurfacer, including a blade and a water tank, but on a smaller scale. These are usually mounted to an ATV or golf-cart–like vehicle.

== In popular culture ==
- Starting in 1980, Charles M. Schulz incorporated Zambonis into his Peanuts comic strip as well as into the 1980 television special She's a Good Skate, Charlie Brown, increasing public awareness of them.
- The term "Zamboni" got a further boost in popular recognition from the 1992 Winter Olympics, when skater Laëtitia Hubert fell so many times she was nicknamed the "Human Zamboni", and the usage of the term "Zamboni" in its general sense subsequently expanded by an order of magnitude.
- In the video game Plants vs. Zombies, there is a zombie known as the "Zomboni" which is a zombie driving a Zamboni.
- On January 16, 2013, in honor of Frank Zamboni's 112th birthday, Google published a Google Doodle dedicated to him. The doodle is a game where the player can clean the surface of a virtual ice rink using an ice resurfacer.
