= Paramount, California =

City in California, United States

- City
- Interactive map of Paramount, California
- Location in the United States
- Coordinates: 33°54′0″N 118°10′0″W
- Country: United States
- State: California
- County: Los Angeles
- Incorporated: January 30, 1957

Government
  - Mayor: Peggy Lemons
  - Vice Mayor: Brenda Olmos
  - City council: Isabel Aguayo; Annette Delgadillo; Vilma Cuellar Stallings
  - City Manager: John Moreno

Area
  - Total: 4.84 sq mi (12.54 km^{2})
  - Land: 4.73 sq mi (12.25 km^{2})
  - Water: 0.11 sq mi (0.29 km^{2}) 2.28%
- Elevation: 69 ft (21 m)

Population (2020)
  - Total: 53,733
  - Density: 11,360/sq mi (4,386/km^{2})
- Time zone: UTC−8 (Pacific)
  - Summer (DST): UTC−7 (PDT)
- ZIP code: 90723
- Area code: 562
- FIPS code: 06-55618
- GNIS feature ID: 1652771
- Website: www.paramountcity.gov

Paramount is a city in Los Angeles County, California, United States. According to the 2020 census, the city had a total population of 53,733, down from 54,098 at the 2010 census. Part of the Greater Los Angeles area, Paramount is bordered by Compton and Lynwood to the west, South Gate and Downey to the north, Bellflower to the east and south, and Long Beach to the south.

== Geography ==
According to the United States Census Bureau, Paramount has a total area of 4.8 square miles (12 km^{2}), of which 4.7 square miles (12 km^{2}) is land and 0.1 square miles (0.26 km^{2}) (2.28%) is water.

== History ==
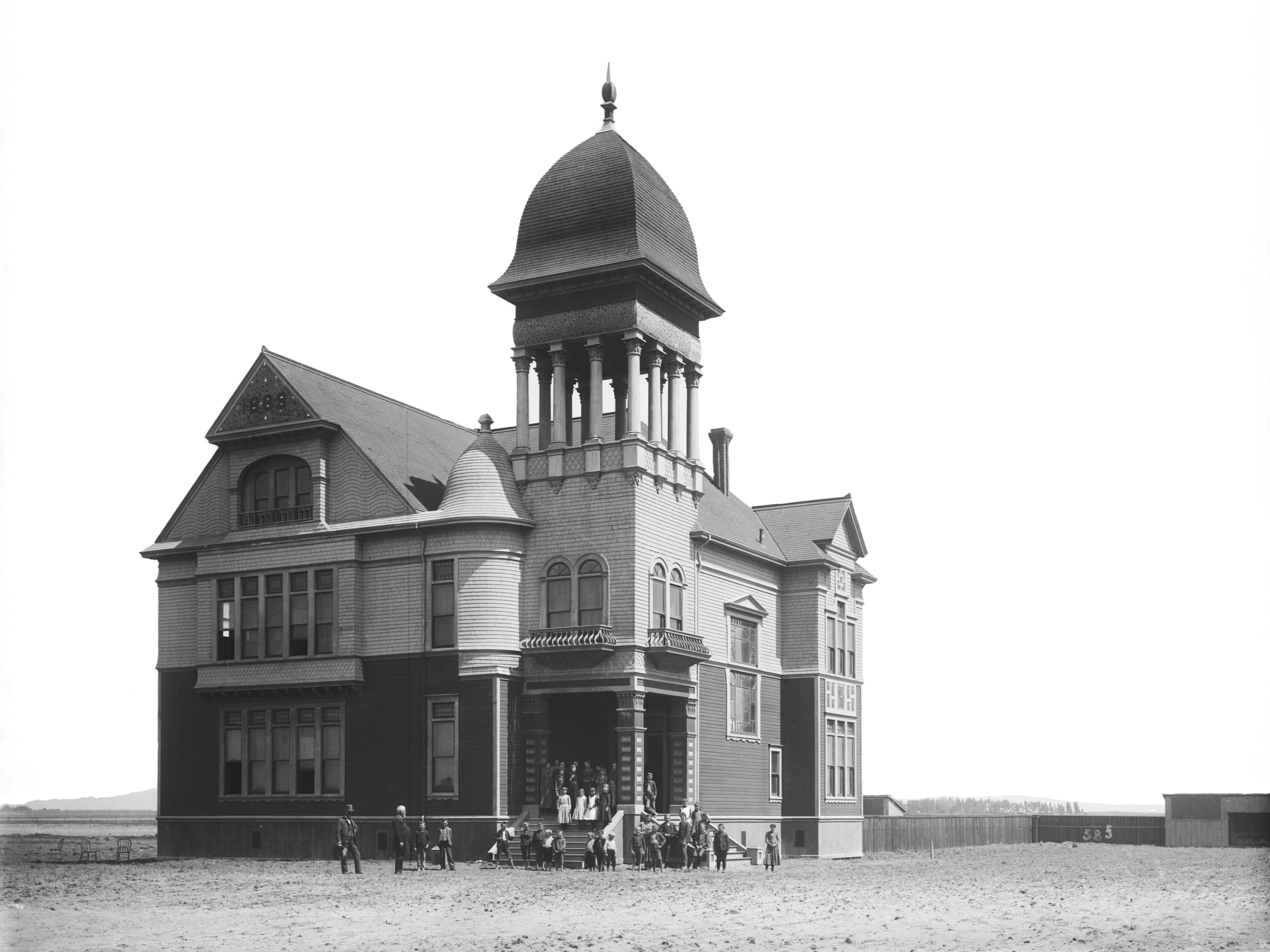
School building in Paramount (then Clearwater) c. 1899

The city today known as Paramount was originally identified in 1781 by Mexican settlers of New Spain. It was organized under two old Spanish Ranchos; on the west, Rancho San Pedro, and on the east, Rancho Los Nietos (now portions of the cities of Santa Fe Springs and Whittier). These ranchos were established under the Spanish Empire and granted by King Carlos III in 1784.

After the Mexican–American War, California was ceded to the United States. The then-unincorporated community of Paramount was created in 1948 when the United States Postmaster General ordered the merger of the post offices of Hynes and Clearwater. The name was taken from Paramount Boulevard, the main north-to-south surface street extending through the city. The city officially incorporated January 30, 1957 following a successful "Save Paramount for Paramount" campaign to fight annexation by Long Beach, Bellflower, and South Gate.

While the Paramount economy was based largely on the hay and dairy industries, the high cost of land led to their local demise. The last Paramount dairy closed in 1977.

=== 2025 ICE protests ===
On June 7, 2025, the city was the site of protests against Immigration and Customs Enforcement (ICE), whereupon President Donald Trump federalized the U.S. National Guard under Title 10. He praised them for a "job well done" before their deployment, while Gov. Gavin Newsom called the move "purposefully inflammatory".

== Demographics ==
Historical population
| Census | Pop. | Note | %± |
|---|---|---|---|
| 1960 | 27,249 | | — |
| 1970 | 34,734 | | 27.5% |
| 1980 | 36,407 | | 4.8% |
| 1990 | 47,669 | | 30.9% |
| 2000 | 55,266 | | 15.9% |
| 2010 | 54,098 | | −2.1% |
| 2020 | 53,733 | | −0.7% |
| 2024 (est.) | 51,169 | ▼ | −4.8% |
U.S. Decennial Census; 1860–1870 1880-1890; 1900 1910 1920; 1930 1940 1950; 1960 1970 1980; 1990 2000 2010; 2020

Paramount was first listed in the 1960 U.S. census as part of the Downey-Norwalk census community division.

=== Racial and ethnic composition ===
Paramount city, California – Racial and ethnic composition Note: the US Census treats Hispanic/Latino as an ethnic category. This table excludes Latinos from the racial categories and assigns them to a separate category. Hispanics/Latinos may be of any race.
| Race / Ethnicity (NH = Non-Hispanic) | Pop 1980 | Pop 1990 | Pop 2000 | Pop 2010 | Pop 2020 | % 1980 | % 1990 | % 2000 | % 2010 | % 2020 |
|---|---|---|---|---|---|---|---|---|---|---|
| White alone (NH) | 16,993 | 10,898 | 4,982 | 3,015 | 2,273 | 46.68% | 22.86% | 9.01% | 5.57% | 4.23% |
| Black or African American alone (NH) | 1,126 | 4,861 | 7,184 | 5,980 | 4,970 | 3.09% | 10.20% | 13.00% | 11.05% | 9.25% |
| Native American or Alaska Native alone (NH) | 288 | 225 | 148 | 86 | 94 | 0.79% | 0.47% | 0.27% | 0.16% | 0.17% |
| Asian alone (NH) | 917 | 2,558 | 1,789 | 1,531 | 1,703 | 2.52% | 5.37% | 3.24% | 2.83% | 3.17% |
| Native Hawaiian or Pacific Islander alone (NH) | 917 | 2,558 | 432 | 396 | 225 | 2.52% | 5.37% | 0.78% | 0.73% | 0.42% |
| Other race alone (NH) | 276 | 129 | 83 | 61 | 208 | 0.76% | 0.27% | 0.15% | 0.11% | 0.39% |
| Mixed race or Multiracial (NH) | x | x | 703 | 482 | 640 | x | x | 1.27% | 0.89% | 1.19% |
| Hispanic or Latino (any race) | 16,807 | 28,998 | 39,945 | 42,547 | 43,620 | 46.16% | 60.83% | 72.28% | 78.65% | 81.18% |
| Total | 36,407 | 47,669 | 55,266 | 54,098 | 53,733 | 100.00% | 100.00% | 100.00% | 100.00% | 100.00% |

=== 2020 census ===
As of the 2020 census, Paramount had a population of 53,733 and a population density of 11,367.3 inhabitants per square mile (4,388.9/km^{2}). The median age was 32.7 years. The age distribution was 26.0% under the age of 18, 11.5% aged 18 to 24, 29.3% aged 25 to 44, 23.6% aged 45 to 64, and 9.6% aged 65 or older. For every 100 females, there were 94.8 males, and for every 100 females age 18 and over, there were 92.3 males age 18 and over.

The census reported that 98.9% of the population lived in households, 0.5% lived in non-institutionalized group quarters, and 0.6% were institutionalized. 100.0% of residents lived in urban areas, while 0.0% lived in rural areas.

There were 14,508 households, of which 48.3% included children under the age of 18. Of all households, 45.7% were married-couple households, 8.7% were cohabiting couple households, 29.7% had a female householder with no spouse or partner present, and 15.8% had a male householder with no spouse or partner present. About 13.7% of households were one person, and 4.8% were one person aged 65 or older. The average household size was 3.66. There were 11,706 families (80.7% of all households).

There were 14,861 housing units at an average density of 3,143.9 units per square mile (1,213.9 units/km^{2}), of which 14,508 (97.6%) were occupied and 353 (2.4%) were vacant. Of occupied units, 42.9% were owner-occupied and 57.1% were renter-occupied. The homeowner vacancy rate was 0.5%, and the rental vacancy rate was 2.4%.

=== 2023 ACS estimates ===
In 2023, the US Census Bureau estimated that the median household income was $70,912, and the per capita income was $24,808. About 11.9% of families and 13.3% of the population were below the poverty line.

=== 2010 census ===
At the 2010 census Paramount had a population of 54,098. The population density was 11,177.1 inhabitants per square mile (4,315.5/km^{2}). The racial makeup of Paramount was 22,988 (42.5%) White (5.6% Non-Hispanic White), 6,334 (11.7%) African American, 440 (0.8%) Native American, 1,629 (3.0%) Asian, 419 (0.8%) Pacific Islander, 20,023 (37.0%) from other races, and 2,265 (4.2%) from two or more races. There were 42,547 residents of Hispanic or Latino ancestry, of any race (78.6%).

The census reported that 53,788 people (99.4% of the population) lived in households, 27 (0%) lived in non-institutionalized group quarters, and 283 (0.5%) were institutionalized.

There were 13,881 households, 7,999 (57.6%) had children under the age of 18 living in them, 6,919 (49.8%) were opposite-sex married couples living together, 3,104 (22.4%) had a female householder with no husband present, 1,328 (9.6%) had a male householder with no wife present. There were 1,153 (8.3%) unmarried opposite-sex partnerships, and 105 (0.8%) same-sex married couples or partnerships. 1,904 households (13.7%) were one person and 558 (4.0%) had someone living alone who was 65 or older. The average household size was 3.87. There were 11,351 families (81.8% of households); the average family size was 4.22.

The age distribution was 17,630 people (32.6%) under the age of 18, 6,360 people (11.8%) aged 18 to 24, 16,271 people (30.1%) aged 25 to 44, 10,421 people (19.3%) aged 45 to 64, and 3,416 people (6.3%) who were 65 or older. The median age was 28.6 years. For every 100 females, there were 94.7 males. For every 100 females age 18 and over, there were 91.9 males.

There were 14,571 housing units at an average density of 3,010.5 per square mile, of the occupied units 6,024 (43.4%) were owner-occupied and 7,857 (56.6%) were rented. The homeowner vacancy rate was 1.8%; the rental vacancy rate was 4.8%. 23,759 people (43.9% of the population) lived in owner-occupied housing units and 30,029 people (55.5%) lived in rental housing units.

According to the 2010 United States Census, Paramount had a median household income of $44,934, with 22.1% of the population living below the federal poverty line.

=== 2000 census ===
According to the 2000 census, Mexican (60.1%) and Filipino (1.5%) were the most common ancestries in the city. Mexico (80.9%) and Guatemala (4.0%) were the most common foreign places of birth.

== Government and infrastructure ==
=== Public services ===
The Los Angeles County Sheriff's Department operates the Lakewood Station in Lakewood, serving Paramount. The department operates the Paramount Substation within Paramount.

The Los Angeles County Department of Health Services operates the South Health Center in Watts, Los Angeles, serving Paramount.

The United States Postal Service Paramount Beach Post Office is located at 7200 Somerset Boulevard.

=== State and federal representation ===
In the California State Legislature, Paramount is in the 33rd senatorial district, represented by Democrat Lena Gonzalez, and in the 62nd Assembly district, represented by Democrat Jose Solache.

In the United States House of Representatives, Paramount is in California's 44th congressional district, represented by Democrat Nanette Barragán.

== Culture ==
Paramount has a large community of Mexicans originally from the state of Sinaloa reflected in the many restaurants selling Mexican food "estilo sinaloense" meaning "Sinaloan style." The city has been described as a "second Sinaloa."

== Transportation ==
The Century Freeway (Interstate 105) passes east–west through the northern portion of Paramount, the Long Beach Freeway (Interstate 710) follows north–south along the city's western border, and the Artesia Freeway (State Route 91) runs east–west less than a one-half-mile from the southern Paramount city limits.

Paramount is served by bus service from Los Angeles County Metropolitan Transportation Authority (MTA) and Long Beach Transit. The city also operates Easy Rider Shuttle City of Paramount - Transportation, a fixed-route local bus.

== Education ==
The Paramount Unified School District includes schools in Paramount, as well as a few in surrounding cities.

The schools located within Paramount are Paramount High School-senior and west campus, Alondra, Lincoln, Wirtz, Jefferson, Mokler, Zamboni, Los Cerritos, Gaines, Jackson, Hollydale, Tanner, Roosevelt, and Paramount Park. Schools that are run by the Paramount Unified School District, but are located in Lakewood include Buena Vista Continuation High School, Odyssey STEM Academy, and Lakewood School. Collins school is also run by PUSD but is located in Long Beach.

Our Lady of the Rosary Private Catholic School is one of several private schools located in Paramount.

Renovations to the high school started at the end of 2007-08 school year. It was a four-phased endeavor that would improve the athletics field, development of a field house, expansion of the gymnasium and finally improvement to the west campus.

== Libraries ==
The County of Los Angeles Public Library operates the Paramount Library.

== Sites and attractions ==
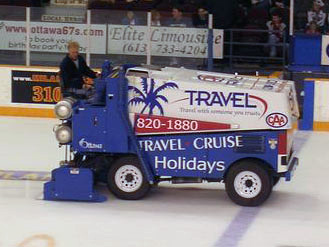
A Zamboni ice resurfacer lays down a layer of clean water, which will freeze to form a smooth ice surface.

The Paramount Hay Tree is a California State Historical Landmark. It is a still standing mature camphor tree remembered for its importance to the hay trading marketplace of the towns of Hynes and Clearwater, which later incorporated as Paramount. The hay traders met under the tree each working day to discuss the price of hay. Their numbers were quoted by the New York mercantile markets as the global hay standard.

Paramount is also home of the Zamboni Company. Frank Joseph Zamboni Jr. is the inventor of the ice resurfacing machine. Zamboni & Co. began and is still headquartered in Paramount. Zamboni manufactures and sells the machines worldwide. Since 1939 the Zamboni family has also operated Iceland, an ice skating rink with improvements patented by Frank Zamboni.

The city also gives its name to a packaging firm called Paramount Global, which was founded here in 1976.

== Sister city ==
Paramount has one sister city:

- Tepic, Mexico

== See also ==
- List of cities in Los Angeles County, California
