= Los Angeles Metropolitan Debate League =

American non-profit policy debate organization

Los Angeles Metropolitan Debate League (LAMDL)
- Founded: 2007
- Purpose: Policy debate
- Location: Los Angeles, California, California United States
- Region served: Los Angeles Unified School District
- Key people: Joseph Flores, Executive Director
- Website: http://www.lamdl.org/

The LAMDL, a non-profit organization, is devoted to bringing debate to urban high schools in the Los Angeles area. The LAMDL is part of a “public-private” partnership, relying on financial contributions from private sources and collaboration with the Los Angeles Unified School District (“LAUSD”). LAMDL also works closely with the University of Southern California. The Annenberg School of Media is a sponsor. LAMDL's Summer Debate Institute is held there every year. Currently, 34 high schools (and counting) are active in the LAMDL. The LAMDL is associated with the National Association for Urban Debate Leagues (“NAUDL”).

The goal of the nationwide urban debate movement is to extend to all motivated high school students in low- and middle-income communities the benefits of participation in debate. Hundreds of thousands of students have participated in urban debate in the last 25 years, and the empirical evidence is overwhelming: Participation in the program improves literacy and academic success; boosts high school graduation and college attendance rates; sharpens critical thinking, research and advocacy skills; bolsters self-confidence and strong work habits; and reduces negative behaviors. In short, urban debate empowers these students with the crucial skills needed for active participation in a democratic society.

== History ==
The National Association for Urban Debate League (NAUDL) launched an urban debate program in Los Angeles in 2008, led by Brett Flater. Originally known as the Los Angeles Urban Debate League (LAUDL), the program started small, with public schools primarily in local districts 6 and 7.

In 2009, the Los Angeles Urban Debate League (as it was previously known) merged with USC’s Neighborhood Debate League, creating what LAMDL is today.

The name change was incurred because of a copyright issue. David Wiltz, the coach of Long Beach Jordan (popularized in the movie Resolved), owned the rights to the name. Although the Long Beach Jordan team were considered “urban debaters,” they were not officially a part of the NAUDL. In order to avoid legal issues, the official LAUDL changed its title to LAMDL.

USC is a major partner to the league, as it provides important support to the Los Angeles Metropolitan Debate League, hosts 2 of LAMDL's tournaments each year, provides free space to hold teacher training seminars, and hosts the league's summer debate institute. Additionally several members of the Trojan Debate squad volunteer as judges at the 6 annual debate competitions.

In 2010, the original Executive Director, Brett Flater, left the LAMDL, to be replaced by coach and volunteer Cameron Ward. Ward is a former nationally competitive high school and college debater, and has volunteered in Urban Debate Leagues since 2000. He has coached teams at different experience levels to elimination rounds at every major national tournament. He is currently coaching VHTPA.

== Participating high schools ==
The following schools across Los Angeles County are currently active participants within the league:

- Alliance Leichtman Levine High School
- Alliance Marine - Innovation & Technology 6-12 Complex,
- Bell High School,
- Bravo Medical Magnet,
- California Academy of Mathematics and Science,
- Carson High School,
- Compton Early College High School,
- Crenshaw High School,
- Culver City High School,
- Downtown Magnets High School,
- East Valley High School,
- Elizabeth Learning Center,
- Environmental Charter High School - Gardena,
- Fremont High School,
- Harbor Teacher Preparation Academy,
- Humanities & Arts Academy,
- Huntington Park High School,
- Intellectual Virtues Academy,
- Lake Balboa College Prepartory,
- Lincoln High School,
- Magnolia Science Academy - 2 Valley,
- Manual Arts High School,
- Maywood Center for Enriched Studies,
- Stern Math and Science School,
- New Designs Charter High School,
- Port of Los Angeles High School,
- Roosevelt High School,
- Roybal Learning Center,
- San Pedro High School,
- South Gate High School,
- STEAM Legacy High School,
- Stern Math and Science School,
- University Preparatory Value High School,
- Valor Academy High School,
- Washington Preparatory High School

== See also ==
- Competitive debate in the United States
