= ELC =

ELC may refer to:

== Education ==
- Eastside Lutheran College, in Warrane, Tasmania, Australia
- ELC English Language Center, an American language school
- elc International School, in Selangor, Malaysia
- eLearning Credits, an initiative of the Government of the United Kingdom
- Elizabeth Learning Center, a public school in Cudahy, California, United States
- Eligibility in the Local Context, in the University of California admissions process
- Entry Level Certificate, in England, Wales and Northern Ireland
- Estherville–Lincoln Central Community School District in Iowa, United States

== Other uses ==
- Equal-loudness contour, a measure of sound pressure for which a listener perceives a constant loudness
- CCL19, a protein
- .elc, the filename suffix for Emacs Lisp compiled bytecode
- Ear lobe crease
- Early Learning Centre, a British children's retailer
- Early Learning Center, a Russian children's retailer
- East Lancashire Coachbuilders, a defunct English bus bodywork builder
- Egyptian Labour Corps of the British Army, during the First World War
- ELC project, a French light tank prototype
- Elcho Island Airport, Northern Territory, Australia
- Enterprise life cycle
- Entity-level controls
- European Lutheran Conference
- Evangelical Lutheran Church (disambiguation)
- ExPRESS Logistics Carrier, of the International Space Station
- London Buses route ELC
- Event Link Controller, an implementation of autonomous peripheral operations in microcontrollers
- Embedded Linux Conference, a conference for companies and developers using Linux in embedded products
