= Walnut Park, California =

Census-designated place in Los Angeles County, California, United States

- Census-designated place
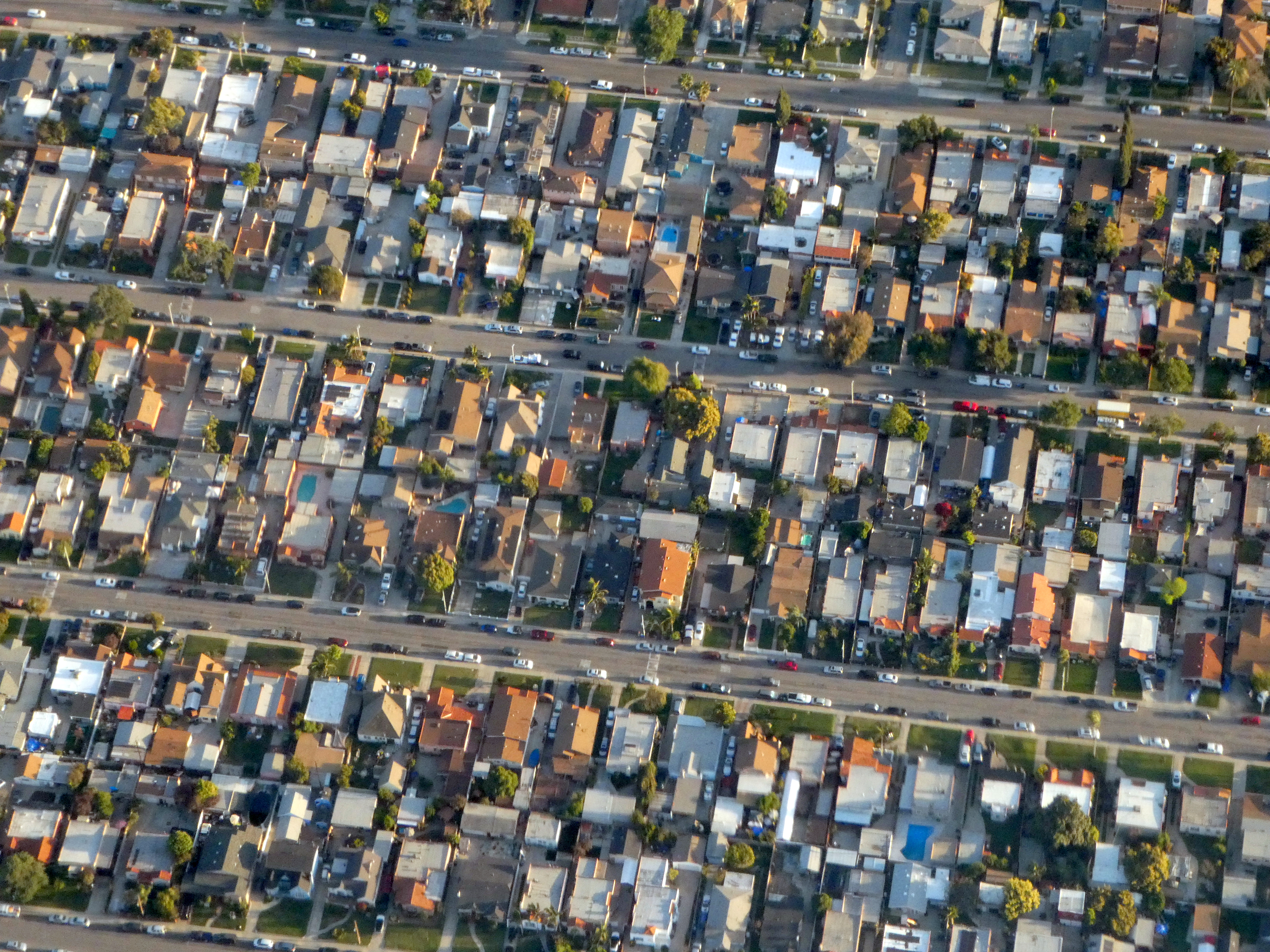
- Aerial view of houses in Walnut Park in April 2024
- Interactive map of Walnut Park, California
- Location in the United States
- Coordinates: 33°58′8″N 118°13′26″W
- Country: United States
- State: California
- County: Los Angeles

Area
  - Total: 0.749 sq mi (1.941 km^{2})
  - Land: 0.749 sq mi (1.941 km^{2})
  - Water: 0 sq mi (0 km^{2}) 0%
- Elevation: 148 ft (45 m)

Population (2020)
  - Total: 15,214
  - Density: 20,300/sq mi (7,838/km^{2})
- Time zone: UTC-8 (PST)
  - Summer (DST): UTC-7 (PDT)
- ZIP code: 90255
- Area code: 213/323
- FIPS code: 06-83402
- GNIS feature ID: 1661650

Walnut Park is a census-designated place (CDP) in Los Angeles County, California, United States, adjacent to Florence-Graham, Huntington Park and South Gate. The population was 15,214 at the 2020 census, a drop from 15,966 at the 2010 census.

== Geography ==
According to the United States Census Bureau, the CDP has a total area of 0.7 square miles (1.8 km^{2}), all land.

== Demographics ==
Historical population
Census	Pop.	Note	%±
1970	8,925		—
1980	11,811		32.3%
1990	14,722		24.6%
2000	16,180		9.9%
2010	15,966		−1.3%
2020	15,214		−4.7%
U.S. Decennial Census; 1860–1870 1880-1890; 1900 1910 1920; 1930 1940 1950; 1960 1970 1980; 1990 2000 2010; 2020

Walnut Park first appeared as an unincorporated place in the 1970 United States census, and as a census-designated place in the 1980 census as part of the Southeast census county division.

=== Racial and ethnic composition ===
Walnut Park CDP, California – Racial and ethnic composition Note: the US Census treats Hispanic/Latino as an ethnic category. This table excludes Latinos from the racial categories and assigns them to a separate category. Hispanics/Latinos may be of any race.
Race / Ethnicity (NH = Non-Hispanic)	Pop 2000	Pop 2010	Pop 2020	% 2000	% 2010	% 2020
White alone (NH)	533	268	214	3.29%	1.68%	1.41%
Black or African American alone (NH)	15	27	54	0.09%	0.17%	0.35%
Native American or Alaska Native alone (NH)	17	15	2	0.11%	0.09%	0.01%
Asian alone (NH)	74	74	52	0.46%	0.46%	0.34%
Native Hawaiian or Pacific Islander alone (NH)	9	2	2	0.06%	0.01%	0.01%
Other race alone (NH)	2	20	28	0.01%	0.13%	0.18%
Mixed race or Multiracial (NH)	34	17	45	0.21%	0.11%	0.30%
Hispanic or Latino (any race)	15,496	15,543	14,817	95.77%	97.35%	97.39%
Total	16,180	15,966	15,214	100.00%	100.00%	100.00%

=== 2020 census ===
As of the 2020 census, Walnut Park had a population of 15,214 and a population density of 20,312.4 inhabitants per square mile (7,842.7/km^{2}).

The age distribution was 23.5% under the age of 18, 11.2% aged 18 to 24, 28.2% aged 25 to 44, 24.5% aged 45 to 64, and 12.5% aged 65 or older. The median age was 35.1 years. For every 100 females, there were 98.5 males, and for every 100 females age 18 and over there were 97.0 males age 18 and over.

The census reported that 99.8% of the population lived in households, 0.2% lived in non-institutionalized group quarters, and no one was institutionalized. 100.0% of residents lived in urban areas, while 0.0% lived in rural areas.

There were 3,726 households, of which 48.9% had children under the age of 18 living in them. Of all households, 49.8% were married-couple households, 8.0% were cohabiting couple households, 15.9% were households with a male householder and no spouse or partner present, and 26.3% were households with a female householder and no spouse or partner present. About 9.7% of all households were made up of individuals and 3.6% had someone living alone who was 65 years of age or older. The average household size was 4.08, and there were 3,208 families (86.1% of all households).

There were 3,818 housing units at an average density of 5,097.5 units per square mile (1,968.2 units/km^{2}), of which 3,726 (97.6%) were occupied and 2.4% were vacant. Of occupied units, 53.0% were owner-occupied and 47.0% were occupied by renters. The homeowner vacancy rate was 0.2% and the rental vacancy rate was 1.8%.

=== Income and poverty ===
In 2023, the US Census Bureau estimated the median household income was $79,205, and the per capita income was $23,908. About 13.2% of families and 14.8% of the population were below the poverty line.

=== 2010 census ===
At the 2010 census Walnut Park had a population of 15,966. The population density was 21,352.0 inhabitants per square mile (8,244.1/km^{2}). The racial makeup of Walnut Park was 9,046 (56.7%) White (1.7% Non-Hispanic White), 70 (0.4%) African American, 277 (1.7%) Native American, 89 (0.6%) Asian, 2 (0.0%) Pacific Islander, 5,953 (37.3%) from other races, and 529 (3.3%) from two or more races. Hispanic or Latino of any race were 15,543 persons (97.4%).

The census reported that 15,952 people (99.9% of the population) lived in households, 14 (0.1%) lived in non-institutionalized group quarters, and no one was institutionalized.

There were 3,612 households, 2,128 (58.9%) had children under the age of 18 living in them, 2,060 (57.0%) were opposite-sex married couples living together, 748 (20.7%) had a female householder with no husband present, 353 (9.8%) had a male householder with no wife present. There were 246 (6.8%) unmarried opposite-sex partnerships, and 23 (0.6%) same-sex married couples or partnerships. 317 households (8.8%) were one person and 130 (3.6%) had someone living alone who was 65 or older. The average household size was 4.42. There were 3,161 families (87.5% of households); the average family size was 4.51.

The age distribution was 4,742 people (29.7%) under the age of 18, 1,849 people (11.6%) aged 18 to 24, 4,821 people (30.2%) aged 25 to 44, 3,266 people (20.5%) aged 45 to 64, and 1,288 people (8.1%) who were 65 or older. The median age was 30.2 years. For every 100 females, there were 101.5 males. For every 100 females age 18 and over, there were 101.3 males.

There were 3,744 housing units at an average density of 5,007.0 per square mile, of the occupied units 1,924 (53.3%) were owner-occupied and 1,688 (46.7%) were rented. The homeowner vacancy rate was 1.1%; the rental vacancy rate was 3.6%. 9,340 people (58.5% of the population) lived in owner-occupied housing units and 6,612 people (41.4%) lived in rental housing units.

== Retail ==
La Alameda shopping center is located at 2140 Florence Ave. This shopping center which amounts to cover 240,000 square feet of retail area. This shopping center was built atop of underutilized and abandoned industrial areas which spanned 18 acres. The shopping plaza is influenced by the Spanish-Mediterranean architecture which is notable through the location's tile and stone elements. The shopping center's creation as well as the location's design is representative of the high Hispanic community and maintained this as its priority throughout its construction and currently in its daily operation. The plaza fosters community events such as health clinics, and holiday celebrations which are free for all to attend. Every week, local bands showcase their music and people of all ages come out to dance and enjoy the evening scene. La Alameda serves as a central shopping and social hub for Walnut Park and surrounding communities' residents.

== Education ==
Los Angeles Unified School District schools serve Walnut Park:

- Walnut Park Elementary School
- Gage Middle School
- Hope Street Elementary School
- Walnut Park Middle School

Most of Walnut Park is zoned to Huntington Park High School. Before 2005 all of Walnut Park was zoned to Huntington Park. In 2005 South East High School opened and took a portion of the land in Walnut Park in its attendance boundary. Any student who lives in the Huntington Park or Bell High School zones may apply to Maywood Academy High School; Maywood Academy, which opened in 2005 and moved into its permanent campus in 2006, does not have its own attendance boundary because it lacks American football, track and field, and tennis facilities.

In addition to Los Angeles Unified School District schools, there are many LAUSD authorized public charter schools that operate in Walnut Park:

- Alliance Margaret M. Bloomfield High School
- Academia Modera (Elementary)

== Politics ==
Walnut Park is unincorporated and is thus directly governed by the County of Los Angeles and represented by Janice Hahn on the Los Angeles County Board of Supervisors.

The Los Angeles County Sheriff's Department (LASD) operates the Century Station in Lynwood, serving Walnut Park.

In the state legislature Walnut Park is located in the 62nd Assembly District, represented by Democrat José Luis Solache, and in the 33rd Senate District, represented by Democrat Lena Gonzalez. Federally, Walnut Park is located in California's 42nd congressional district, which is represented by Democrat Robert Garcia.
