= Pueblo Del Rio =

Public housing project in Los Angeles, US

Coordinates: 33°59′39.8″N 118°14′33.9″W

Pueblo Del Rio is a public housing project located in the Central-Alameda neighborhood of South Los Angeles, California. The address of Pueblo Del Rio is 1801 East 53rd Street, which is near the intersection of 55th and Alameda streets.

== History ==
Constructed in 1941 under the auspices of the National Housing Administration, Pueblo Del Rio was originally designed to house low-income laborers at the factories south of Downtown Los Angeles and military veterans. Like other housing projects of the era, Pueblo Del Rio's design was based on the "garden city" template. According to this design motif, clusters of two-story buildings would be situated around open grassy spaces where the children of the residents could play. Prominent architects such as Paul Revere Williams and Richard Neutra helped design the layout of Pueblo Del Rio.

== Demographics ==
Throughout most of its history, Pueblo Del Rio housed primarily African American residents. One of its most notable former residents was Dr. Shirley Weber, who serves as the 31st secretary of state of California. Later in the 1990s, however, large numbers of Latinos began moving into the housing complex. Today, Blacks, Latinos, and Cambodian immigrants call Pueblo Del Rio home. Some families have been living in Pueblo Del Rio for more than three generations. Almost fifty percent of the residents of Pueblo Del Rio are children or teenagers.

=== Parks and recreation ===
It is home to five parks and a recreation center, which were much improved through Los Angeles Councilwoman Jan Perry's initiative in 2012.

== Education ==
Pueblo Del Rio is zoned into the Los Angeles Unified School District. The public schools serving Pueblo Del Rio include Holmes Elementary School, Edison Middle School, Huntington Park High School, and Maywood Academy High School.

== Crime ==
During the 1970s, many of the factories which employed Pueblo Del Rio's residents were closed. This created a vacuum of opportunity in the area, and as a result, the crime rate skyrocketed.

The Pueblo Del Rio was known for illegal activity in South Los Angeles. Shootings, stabbings, assaults, gang activity, narcotics trafficking, and vandalism are all frequent at Pueblo Del Rio. Much of the crime at Pueblo Del Rio is gang related; Los Angeles Police Department reported of 3 gangs that have been active in the Pueblo Housing Projects, The 52 Pueblo Bishop Bloods and E/S Oriental Boyz.

=== FBI Raids ===
On August 26, 2010, the Federal Bureau of Investigation and Los Angeles Police Department raided the Pueblo Bishop Bloods through the Racketeer Influenced and Corrupt Organizations Act. Crime has since decreased in the area.

== In Arts and Literature ==
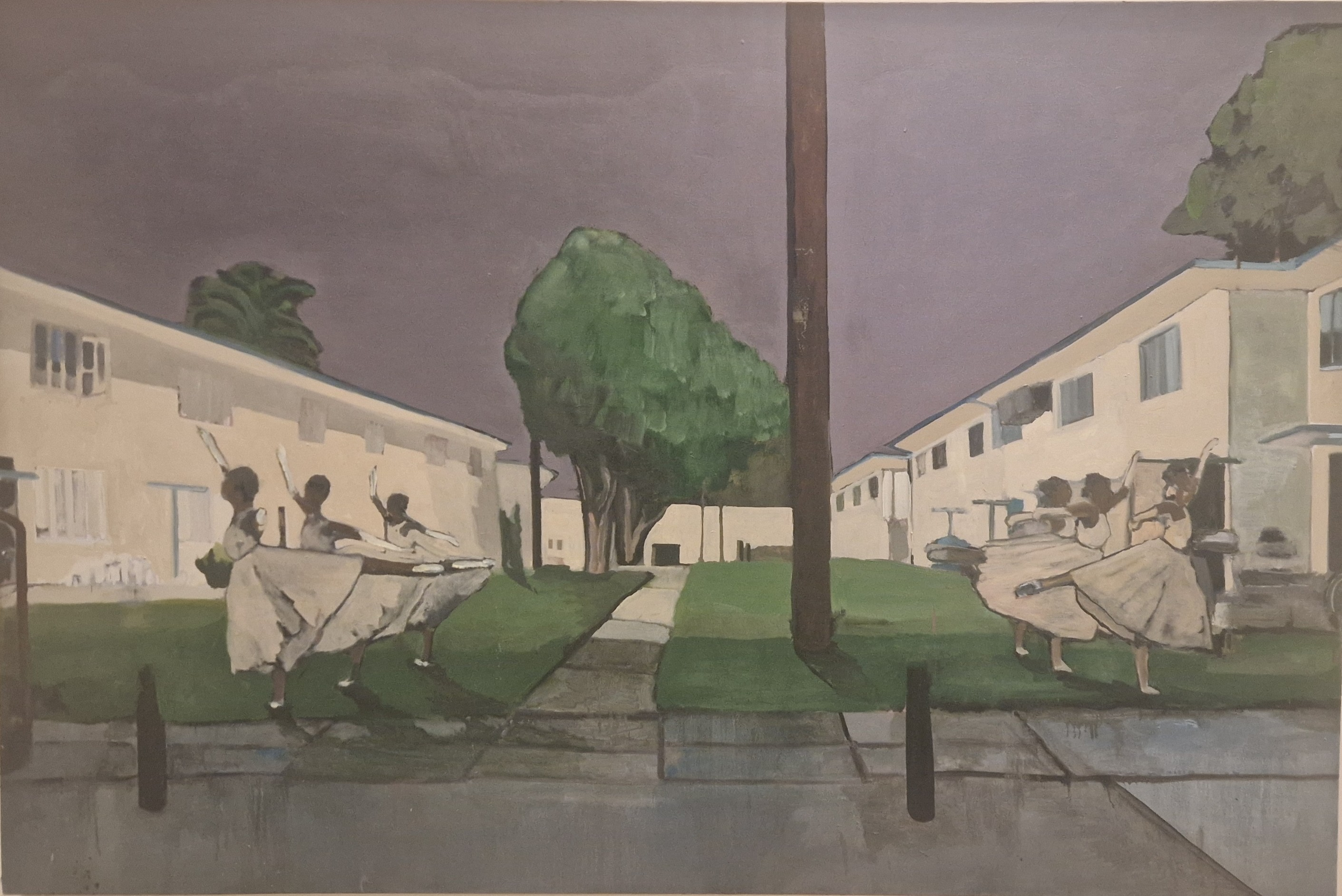
Pueblo del Rio: Arabesque, 2014

The American painter Noah Davis produced a body of work which took Pueblo Del Rio as its subject. The Pueblo del Rio series is considered to be "[p]erhaps the most lyrical of all Davis’s paintings..., set in [Paul Revere] Williams’s LA housing project for black defence workers in 1941. With low-rise buildings and shared green lawns, it should have been a garden city; but it quickly degenerated. Davis paints it back into beauty"
