= Cudahy, California =

City in California, United States

- City
- Clara Street

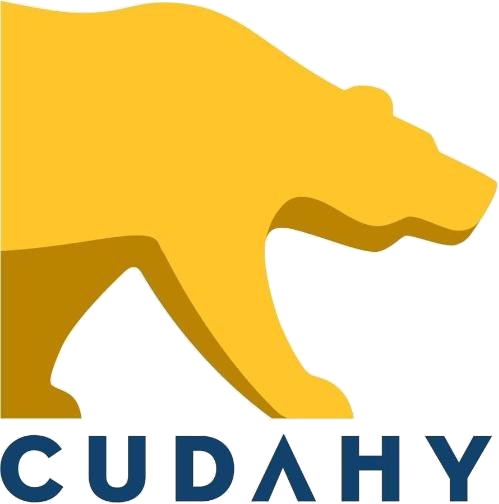
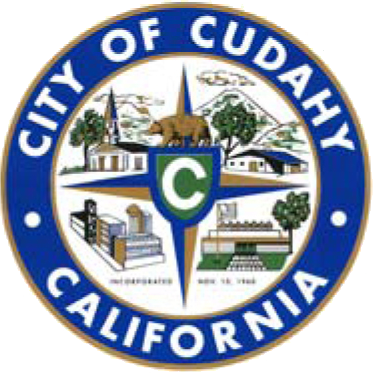
- Current logo Coat of arms Former logo
- Interactive map of Cudahy, California
- Location in the United States Cudahy (California) Cudahy (the United States)
- Coordinates: 33°57′51″N 118°10′57″W
- Country: United States
- State: California
- County: Los Angeles
- Incorporated: November 10, 1960
- Named for: Michael Cudahy

Government
  - Type: Council Manager
  - Mayor: Elizabeth Alcantar
  - Vice Mayor: Cynthia Gonzalez
  - City Council: Daisy Lomelí; Martin U. Fuentes; Amanda Gomez
  - City Manager: Alfonso Noyola

Area
  - Total: 1.23 sq mi (3.18 km^{2})
  - Land: 1.18 sq mi (3.05 km^{2})
  - Water: 0.050 sq mi (0.13 km^{2}) 4.15%
- Elevation: 121 ft (37 m)

Population (2020)
  - Total: 22,811
  - Density: 19,393.1/sq mi (7,487.73/km^{2})
- Time zone: UTC-8 (PST)
  - Summer (DST): UTC-7 (PDT)
- ZIP Code: 90201
- Area code: 213/323
- FIPS code: 06-17498
- GNIS feature ID: 1652694
- Website: www.cityofcudahyca.gov

Cudahy (/ˈkʌdəheɪ/ KUD-ə-hay) is a city located in southeastern Los Angeles County, California, United States. Cudahy has one of the highest population densities of any incorporated city in the United States. It is part of the Gateway Cities region and had a population of 22,811 as of the 2020 U.S. census.

== History ==
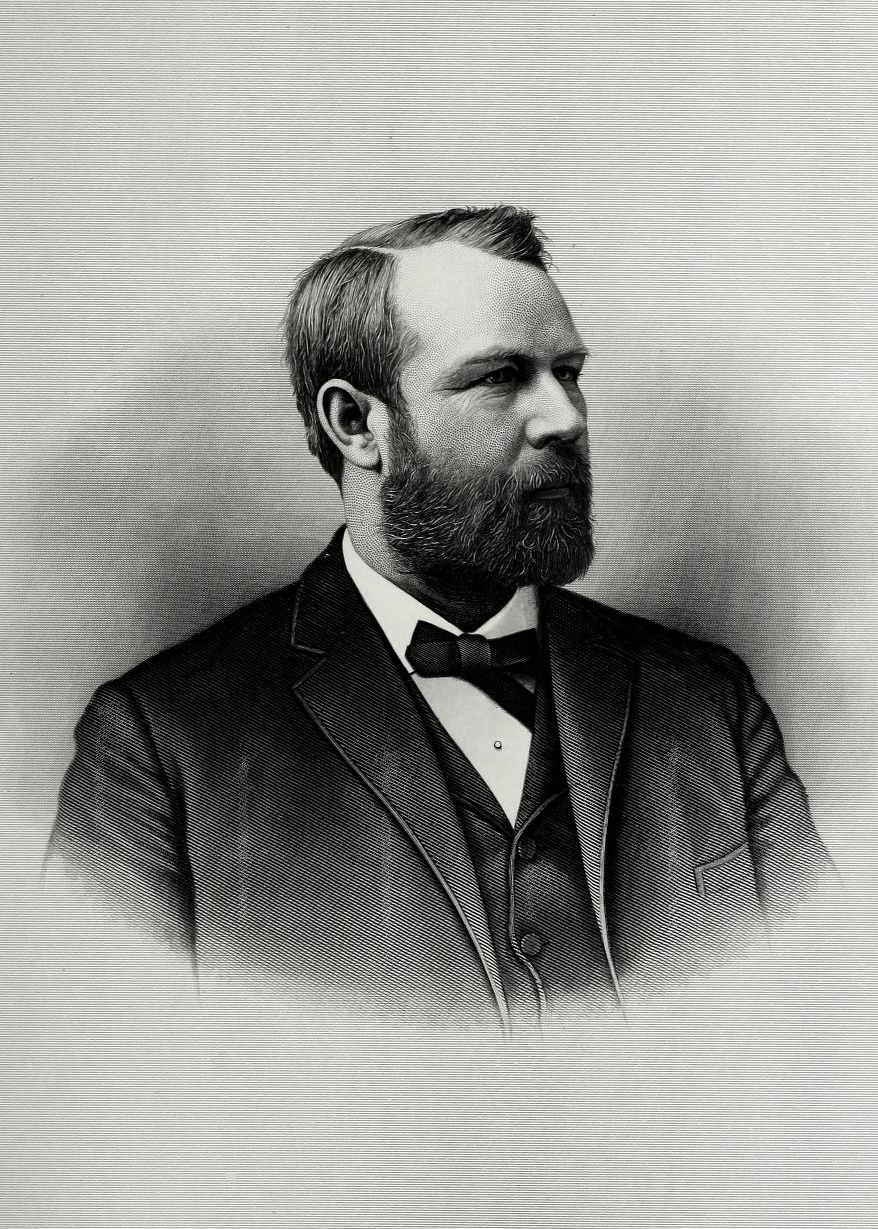
Michael Cudahy, the city's namesake

Cudahy is named for its founder, meat-packing baron Michael Cudahy, who purchased the original 2,777 acres (1,124 hectares) of Rancho San Antonio in 1908 to resell as 1-acre (44,000 ft^{2}; 4,000 m^{2}; 0.40 ha) lots. These "Cudahy lots" were notable for their size—in most cases, 50 to 100 feet (15 to 30 m) in width and 600 to 800 feet (183 to 244 m) in depth, at least equivalent to a city block in most American towns. Such parcels, often referred to as "railroad lots", were intended to allow the new town's residents to keep a large vegetable garden, a grove of fruit trees (usually citrus), and a chicken coop or horse stable. This arrangement, popular in the towns along the lower Los Angeles and San Gabriel rivers, proved particularly attractive to the Southerners and Midwesterners who were leaving their struggling farms in droves in the 1910s and 1920s to start new lives in Southern California.

As late as the 1950s, some Cudahy residents were still riding into the city's downtown areas on horseback. After World War II the city was a White American blue collar town with steel and automobile plants in the area.

By the late 1970s, the factories closed down and the white residents of Cudahy left for jobs and housing in the San Gabriel and San Fernando Valleys. Stucco apartment complexes were built on former tracts of land. The population density increased; in 2007 the city was the second-densest in California, after Maywood.

The city was subjected to a major political corruption incident when the former mayor and the one-time city manager were indicted on bribery and extortion charges for supporting the opening of a medical marijuana dispensary. As a result of these charges, on July 12, 2012, ex-mayor David Silva, councilman Osvaldo Conde, and former City Manager Angel Perales, 43, each pleaded guilty to one count of bribery and extortion; according to plea agreements they each face up to 30 years in prison.

On January 14, 2020, Delta Air Lines Flight 89 dumped jet fuel onto Cudahy, while making an emergency landing at Los Angeles International Airport. Park Avenue Elementary School suffered the brunt of this dumping. This incident sparked outrage because of the city's previous history of environmental damage, including the construction of the same school on top of an old dump site that contained contaminated soil with toxic sludge, and pollution from the Exide battery plant. The mayor, Elizabeth Alcantar, pushed for better compensation from Delta for the impact on residents and the city.

== Geography ==
According to the United States Census Bureau, the city has a total area of 3.175 square kilometers (1.226 mi^{2}), over 95% of it land.

Cudahy is bordered by Bell on the north, Bell Gardens on the east, South Gate on the south and southwest, and Huntington Park on the west.

In 2007, of the 5,800 housing units, 5,000 were rentals.

== Demographics ==
Historical population
| Census | Pop. | Note | %± |
|---|---|---|---|
| 1970 | 16,998 | | — |
| 1980 | 18,275 | | 7.5% |
| 1990 | 22,817 | | 24.9% |
| 2000 | 24,208 | | 6.1% |
| 2010 | 23,805 | | −1.7% |
| 2020 | 22,811 | | −4.2% |
U.S. Decennial Census; 1860–1870 1880-1890; 1900 1910 1920; 1930 1940 1950; 1960 1970 1980; 1990 2000 2010; 2020

Cudahy first appeared as a city in the 1970 U.S. census as part of the Southeast census county division.

=== Racial and ethnic composition ===
Cudahy city, California – Racial and ethnic composition Note: the US Census treats Hispanic/Latino as an ethnic category. This table excludes Latinos from the racial categories and assigns them to a separate category. Hispanics/Latinos may be of any race.
| Race / Ethnicity (NH = Non-Hispanic) | Pop 1980 | Pop 1990 | Pop 2000 | Pop 2010 | Pop 2020 | % 1980 | % 1990 | % 2000 | % 2010 | % 2020 |
|---|---|---|---|---|---|---|---|---|---|---|
| White alone (NH) | 4,504 | 1,790 | 872 | 505 | 401 | 25.04% | 7.85% | 3.60% | 2.12% | 1.76% |
| Black or African American alone (NH) | 145 | 195 | 184 | 193 | 167 | 0.81% | 0.85% | 0.76% | 0.81% | 0.73% |
| Native American or Alaska Native alone (NH) | 372 | 146 | 65 | 46 | 37 | 2.07% | 0.64% | 0.27% | 0.19% | 0.16% |
| Asian alone (NH) | 422 | 319 | 166 | 110 | 157 | 2.35% | 1.40% | 0.69% | 0.46% | 0.69% |
| Native Hawaiian or Pacific Islander alone (NH) | 422 | 319 | 24 | 8 | 26 | 2.35% | 1.40% | 0.10% | 0.03% | 0.11% |
| Other race alone (NH) | 66 | 79 | 20 | 41 | 64 | 0.37% | 0.35% | 0.08% | 0.17% | 0.28% |
| Mixed race or Multiracial (NH) | x | x | 87 | 52 | 87 | x | x | 0.36% | 0.22% | 0.38% |
| Hispanic or Latino (any race) | 12,475 | 20,288 | 22,790 | 22,850 | 21,872 | 69.37% | 88.92% | 94.14% | 95.99% | 95.88% |
| Total | 17,984 | 22,817 | 24,208 | 23,805 | 22,811 | 100.00% | 100.00% | 100.00% | 100.00% | 100.00% |

=== 2020 census ===
As of the 2020 census, Cudahy had a population of 22,811 and a population density of 19,397.1 inhabitants per square mile (7,489.3/km^{2}). The age distribution was 28.2% under the age of 18, 12.3% aged 18 to 24, 29.2% aged 25 to 44, 22.4% aged 45 to 64, and 7.9% aged 65 or older. The median age was 30.4 years. For every 100 females, there were 97.0 males, and for every 100 females age 18 and over, there were 93.8 males age 18 and over.

The census reported that 99.9% of the population lived in households, 0.1% lived in non-institutionalized group quarters, and no one was institutionalized. Cudahy was 100.0% urban and 0.0% rural.

There were 5,745 households, of which 56.3% had children under the age of 18. Of all households, 46.7% were married-couple households, 10.7% were cohabiting couple households, 28.1% had a female householder with no spouse or partner present, and 14.4% had a male householder with no spouse or partner present. About 8.8% of households were one-person households, and 3.7% were one-person households with a resident aged 65 or older. The average household size was 3.97, and there were 4,953 families (86.2% of all households).

There were 5,854 housing units at an average density of 4,977.9 units per square mile (1,922.0 units/km^{2}). Of these, 5,745 (98.1%) were occupied and 1.9% were vacant. The homeowner vacancy rate was 0.0%, and the rental vacancy rate was 1.6%. Of occupied units, 17.7% were owner-occupied and 82.3% were renter-occupied.

=== 2023 ACS 5-year estimate ===
In 2023, the US Census Bureau estimated that the median household income was $52,748, and the per capita income was $17,618. About 25.1% of families and 27.9% of the population were below the poverty line.

=== 2010 census ===
At the 2010 census Cudahy had a population of 23,805. The population density was 19,417.5 inhabitants per square mile (7,497.1/km^{2}). The racial makeup of Cudahy was 11,708 (49.2%) White (2.1% Non-Hispanic White), 333 (1.4%) African American, 246 (1.0%) Native American, 137 (0.6%) Asian, 24 (0.1%) Pacific Islander, 10,339 (43.4%) from other races, and 1,018 (4.3%) from two or more races. Hispanic or Latino of any race were 22,850 persons (96.0%).

The census reported that 23,797 people (100% of the population) lived in households, 8 (0%) lived in non-institutionalized group quarters, and no one was institutionalized.

There were 5,607 households, 3,712 (66.2%) had children under the age of 18 living in them, 2,941 (52.5%) were opposite-sex married couples living together, 1,362 (24.3%) had a female householder with no husband present, 686 (12.2%) had a male householder with no wife present. There were 589 (10.5%) unmarried opposite-sex partnerships, and 42 (0.7%) same-sex married couples or partnerships. 399 households (7.1%) were one person and 176 (3.1%) had someone living alone who was 65 or older. The average household size was 4.24. There were 4,989 families (89.0% of households); the average family size was 4.32.

The age distribution was 8,325 people (35.0%) under the age of 18, 2,858 people (12.0%) aged 18 to 24, 7,279 people (30.6%) aged 25 to 44, 4,121 people (17.3%) aged 45 to 64, and 1,222 people (5.1%) who were 65 or older. The median age was 27.0 years. For every 100 females, there were 98.3 males. For every 100 females age 18 and over, there were 95.5 males.

There were 5,770 housing units at an average density of 4,706.5 per square mile, of the occupied units 1,011 (18.0%) were owner-occupied and 4,596 (82.0%) were rented. The homeowner vacancy rate was 1.3%; the rental vacancy rate was 2.3%. 4,355 people (18.3% of the population) lived in owner-occupied housing units and 19,442 people (81.7%) lived in rental housing units.

According to the 2010 United States Census, Cudahy had a median household income of $38,267, with 31.8% of the population living below the federal poverty line.

=== 2000 census ===
According to the 2000 census, 93.8% of Cudahy was Latino.

As of 2000, Mexican (70.0%) and Salvadoran (5.7%) were the most common ancestries. Mexico (74.5%) and El Salvador (12.0%) were the most common foreign places of birth.

== Government ==
In the Los Angeles County Board of Supervisors, Cudahy is in the Fourth District, represented by Janice Hahn.

In the California State Legislature, Cudahy is in the 33rd senatorial district, represented by Democrat Lena Gonzalez, and in the 64th Assembly district, represented by Democrat Blanca Pacheco.

In the United States House of Representatives, Cudahy is in California's 42nd congressional district, represented by Democrat Robert Garcia.

Cudahy's council is elected through at-large elections with four-year seats.

== Elections ==
=== 2015 ===
In March 2015, Measure A, which proposed a term limit of two four-year terms for City Council members, with partial terms of any length counting as a full term, was put to a vote. The measure was approved, with 672 "yes" votes to 133 "no" votes.

In that same election, five people (Christian Hernandez, Cristian Markovich, Adam Ochoa, Diane Oliva, and Baru Sanchez) ran for three city council seats. Hernandez, Markovich, and Sanchez won the election.

== Infrastructure ==
Police Services used to be contracted through the City of Bell, but now contracts with the Los Angeles County Sheriff's Department.

The Los Angeles County Department of Health Services operates the Whittier Health Center in Whittier, serving Cudahy.

The United States Postal Service Cudahy Post Office is located at 4619 Elizabeth Street.

== Transportation ==
Several bus routes operate through the town including Los Angeles Metro Bus routes 260/261 and 611. Route 111 operates on nearby Florence Avenue. The city government operates its own fare-free bus, named Cudahy Area Rapid Transit (CART), that runs hourly on a loop within city limits.

== Economy ==
After World War II the population of Cudahy worked for plants operated by General Motors, Chrysler, Firestone, and Bethlehem Steel. In 2007 the largest employers in Cudahy were the Kmart/Big Lots Center and the Superior Super Warehouse.

== Education ==
Cudahy is a part of the Los Angeles Unified School District. Cudahy is served by several schools, including Teresa Hughes Elementary School, Park Avenue Elementary School, Elizabeth Learning Center (a neighborhood school for grades K-8 and a high school for grades 9 through 12), Ochoa Learning Center (K-8), and Bell High School in Bell.

All residents are zoned to Bell High School. Any student who lives in the Bell or Huntington Park High School zones may apply to Maywood Academy High School; Maywood Academy, which opened in 2005 and moved into its permanent campus in 2006, does not have its own attendance boundary because it lacks American football, track and field, and tennis facilities.

Jaime Escalante Elementary School opened in Cudahy on August 16, 2010, named after Jaime Escalante, who was an East Los Angeles-high school educator.

An analysis based on census data, classified Cudahy as the 4th least educated city in California with 37.9 of its population not having completed the ninth grade.

=== Public libraries ===
The County of Los Angeles Public Library operates the Cudahy Library at 5218 Santa Ana Street.

== See also ==
- Gateway Cities
