= Curriculum Online =

UK government education initiative

Curriculum Online was part of the United Kingdom government's drive to get more ICT and multimedia resources in classrooms across the country. This was done primarily through the eLearning Credits (ELCs) scheme, which was operated by Curriculum Online.

The project was closed down in the autumn of 2008, when the ELC scheme ended.
