= Kundy Gutierrez =

Mexico National Baseball Team former manager

Kundy Gutierrez is the former general manager of the Mexico National Baseball Team. He is the founder and partner of The Baseball Legends that was established in 2009 at the MLB Urban Youth Academy. Prior to working in baseball, Gutierrez was involved in development of new construction and served as a construction consultant.

== Early life ==
Gutierrez was born on July 24, 1979, in Watts, California, and raised in South Gate, California. Both parents immigrated to the United States from Mexico. Gutierrez was raised in the Mexican culture. He attended school in Westwood and West LA, attending University High School until his sophomore year, when he transferred to South Gate High School and graduated.

Gutierrez in 2005 relocated his family to Brawley, California.

== Business career ==
Prior to baseball, Gutierrez worked as a director of construction, project manager, construction manager, purchasing manager, and on-site and off-site superintendent. He was the founder and CEO of Old School Builders, Inc., a construction company. He worked for Pacifica Companies and DR Horton for over 6 years.

Gutierrez is the founder and one of the partners, along with Cecil Fielder, of The Baseball Legends (TBL Tournaments). TBL Tournaments is known for their summer national event called Cecil Fielder Elite World Series.

== Baseball career ==
=== Mexico National Baseball Team ===
Gutierrez joined the front office of the Mexico national baseball team in 2015. He was hired by Alonso Perez Gonzalez, President of Federacion Mexicana de Beisbol, A.C. (FEMEBE) to structure and operate upcoming international events Premier12. When Gutierrez started with the national team, they were ranked 13 in the world through "WBSC". On his first international event, Mexico got to the final four when it had never played in a semi-final. Mexico ended up in fourth place in the Premier12 first time in their history, and they rose in the rankings from 13th to 7th.

Gutierrez's next event was the WBC Qualifier in Mexicali, Baja California, Mexico, where the Mexico National Baseball Team captured the title and qualified for the 2017 WBC.

In November 2016, together with the Mexican League and Mexican Pacific League, the team was invited to participate in an exhibition game versus Japan national baseball team for the Samurai Challenge. For the first time in history, the team defeated the Japan national baseball team, ending the two-game series in a 1-1.

In December 2016, they launched the Team Mexico Baseball platform to promote the game of baseball to create a transparent system to give equal opportunity to all the participants and a ranking system to help elevate the competition in Mexico as well as improving development, instruction, and scouting.

In the 2017 World Baseball Classic, Gutierrez and the Mexico national baseball team were defeated in the first round.

In January 2018, FEMEBE was recognized as the number 5 ranked in the world through "WBSC" The ranking is based on the 12U, 15U, 18U, 23U, and Pro Team which a point system is established for the participation of each event being the highest point event is the Premier 12.

In November 2019, Mexico returned to the 2019 WBSC Premier12, which started in Guadalajara, Jalisco, Mexico. They went undefeated in the first round, facing the Dominican Republic, United States, and Netherlands. Mexico moved on to the second round in Tokyo, Japan. During the super round, they went 2-2. Advancing to the bronze game, they faced the United States in an important game to qualify for the 2020 Summer Olympics in Tokyo. The game went to an extra inning with Mexico emerging with the victory, 3-2. The national team finally qualified for an Olympics.

== Personal life ==
Gutierrez resides in Brawley, California with his wife Yesenia, and their five children.
