= Irvine Valley =

Irvine Valley may refer to:

- Irvine Valley College, California, United States
- the valley of the River Irvine in Scotland
