= English Language Center =

ELC English Language Center
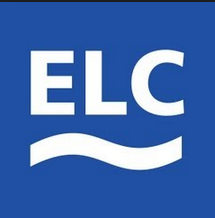
- Company type: English Language School
- Founded: Los Angeles, California, 1978
- Headquarters: Boston, Massachusetts, United States
- Number of locations: 7
- Services: English courses, examination preparation courses, university placement
- Website: ELC English Language Center

ELC English Language Center is a privately operated group of English language schools providing English language instruction to international students in the United States. It operates centers in Los Angeles, Boston, and Santa Barbara. ELC was founded in Los Angeles in 1978 and has since grown into a multi-city institution serving students from more than 50 countries.

All three ELC centers are accredited by ACCET (Accrediting Council for Continuing Education and Training), which is recognized by the United States Department of Education. ELC Los Angeles, ELC Boston, and ELC Santa Barbara are each authorized by the U.S. Department of Homeland Security to issue the SEVIS Form I-20 for international student enrollment.

ELC is a member of several professional organizations, including the International Association of Language Centres (IALC), EnglishUSA, ALTO, and NAFSA. ELC Los Angeles and ELC Santa Barbara are additionally licensed by the California Bureau for Private Postsecondary Education (BPPE). All three centers serve as authorized open test sites for the University of Cambridge language examination series, including the FCE, CAE, and CPE examinations, and ELC Los Angeles and ELC Boston are authorized administration sites for the institutional TOEFL and TOEIC examinations.

== History ==
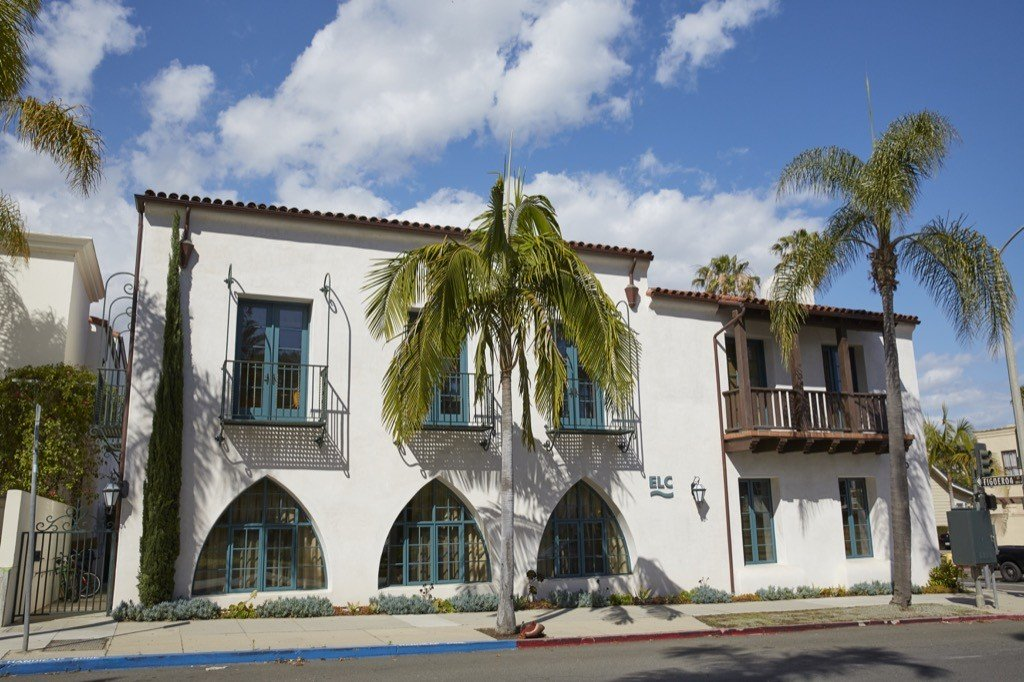
ELC building in Santa Barbara

=== 1970s and 1980s ===
- ELC English Language Center was founded as an English education institute in Los Angeles, in 1978.

=== 1990s ===
- ELC English Language Center opens its second location In Boston, Massachusetts in 1990.
- ELC Boston teaches many of the Boston Bruins English.
- ELC opens its first residential summer program on campus at the University of California, Los Angeles in 1995

=== 2000s ===
- ELC Harvard Square opens in a location above Harvard Square.
- ELC opens its second residential summer program at Suffolk University in downtown Boston, and its third residential summer program at UCSB in Goleta, CA.

=== 2010s ===
ELC launched a fourth summer residential program at the Massachusetts Institute of Technology (MIT). ELC Santa Barbara opened on State Street. In 2017, ELC hosted the annual IALC conference in Boston.
