= Maywood Academy High School =

Coordinates: 33°58′56″N 118°11′20″W

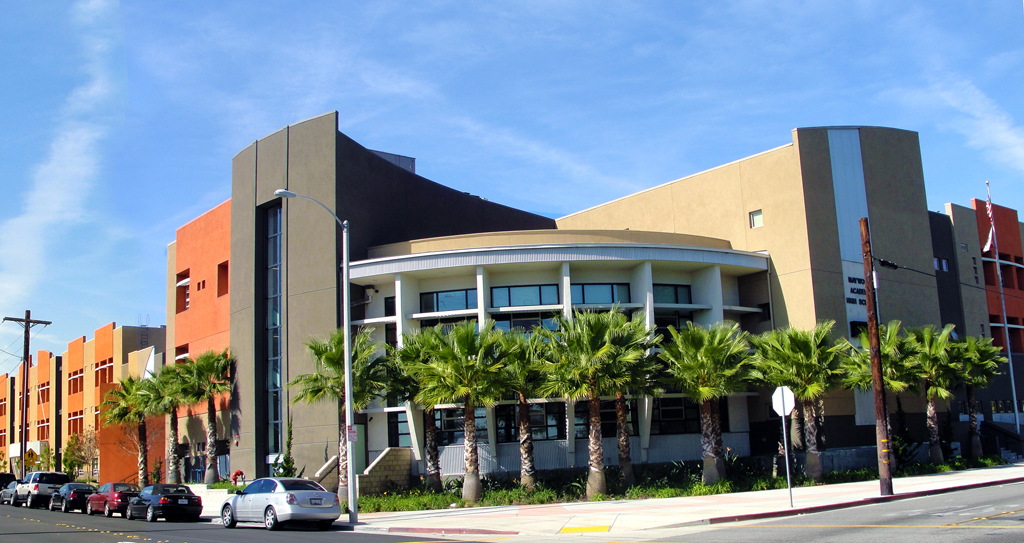

Location
- 6125 Pine Avenue; Maywood, California 90270

Information
- School type: Public school
- Established: 2006
- Teaching staff: 51.00 (FTE)
- Enrolment: 1,172 (2019-20)
- Student to teacher ratio: 24.02
- Colors: Blue, White, Black
- Mascot: Nighthawk
- Website: maywoodacademyhs.lausd.org

Maywood Academy High School (MAHS) is an alternative high school of the Los Angeles Unified School District, located in Maywood, CA.

All residents are zoned to Bell High School in Bell and Huntington Park High School in Huntington Park may apply to Maywood Academy High School; Maywood Academy, which opened in 2005 and moved into its permanent campus in 2006, does not have its own attendance boundary because it lacks American football, track and field, and tennis facilities. Several municipalities are in the service zone of MAHS.

Areas within the service zone include the City of Maywood, the City of Bell, the City of Cudahy, the City of Huntington Park, portions of Vernon, and most of the Walnut Park census-designated place.

In 2025, 98% of the students were Hispanic or Latino American.

== Academies ==
The high school previously offered four Small Learning Communities (SLCs) for approximately 200 students, specializing in: Architecture/Design, Performing Arts, Radio Production, and Information/ Technology. In 2010, as part of the Public School Choice Process, the students, staff and parents elected to move from four SLCs to three: School of Liberal Arts (SoLA), School of Science, and School of Business and Technology. The course offerings from the previous SLCs will be liquidated into the three improved SLCs. The concept of Small Learning Communities is to create opportunities for individualized learning experiences in collaboration between teachers, students and parents.

By 2019 the school was no longer following the SLC model and there are no Academies. All students have equal access to all classes offered by the school.

== Nighthawk Cravings Food Truck ==
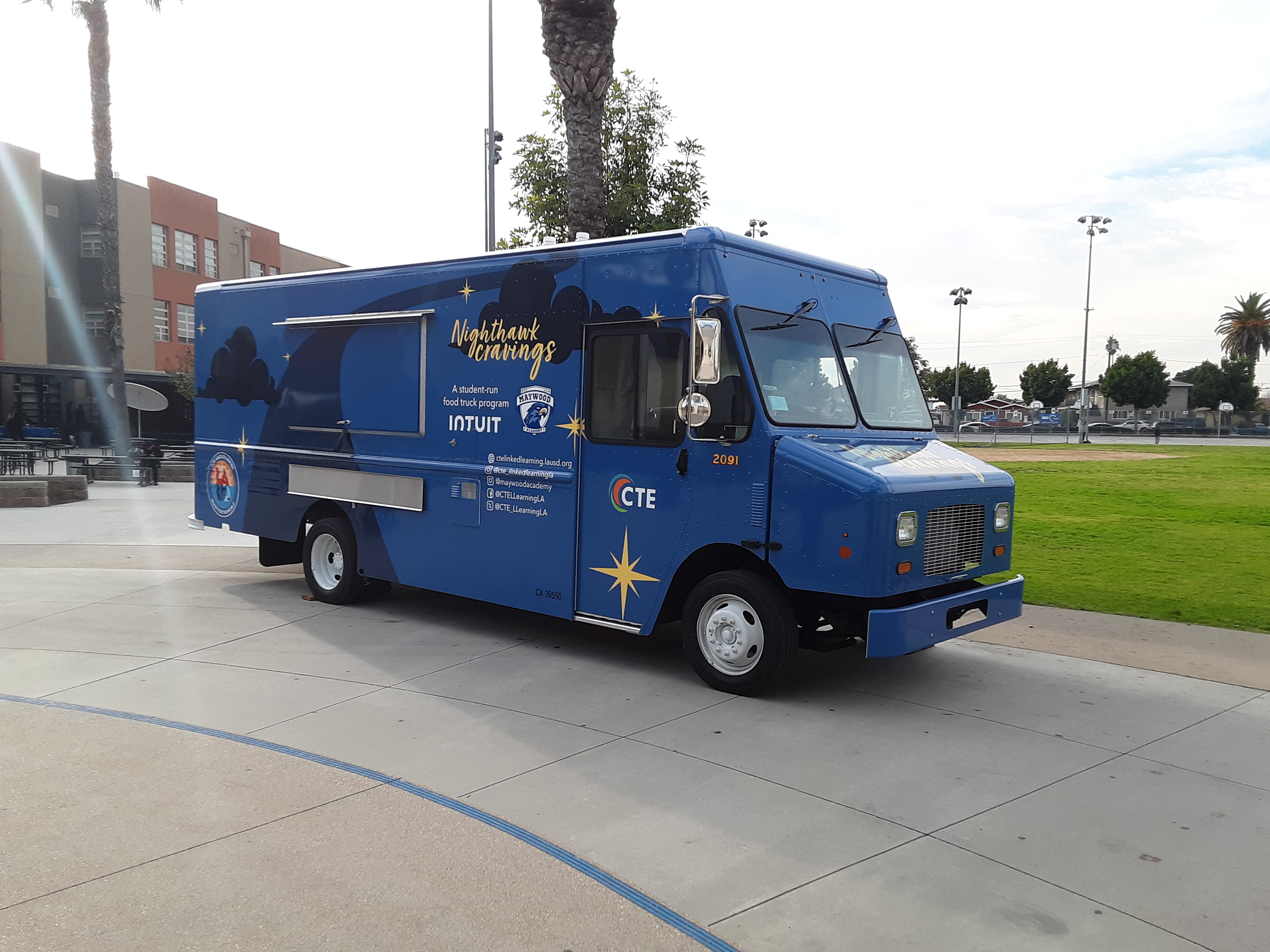
Nighthawk Cravings - a student-run food truck donated by Intuit Inc. to LAUSD CTE Linked-Learning.

In January 2024 Intuit Inc. donated a brand new food truck to the school's Culinary Arts program. The students developed a business plan involving market research and designed and named the truck, "Nighthawk Cravings" (the school's mascot is a Nighthawk). This student-run food truck will provide students with the opportunity to develop technical, financial, and entrepreneurial skills in a real-world setting. The two-year Culinary Arts program is run through LAUSD's CTE-Linked Learning program, and students earn both a California Food Handler Card and Food Safety Manager Certification.

== Athletics ==
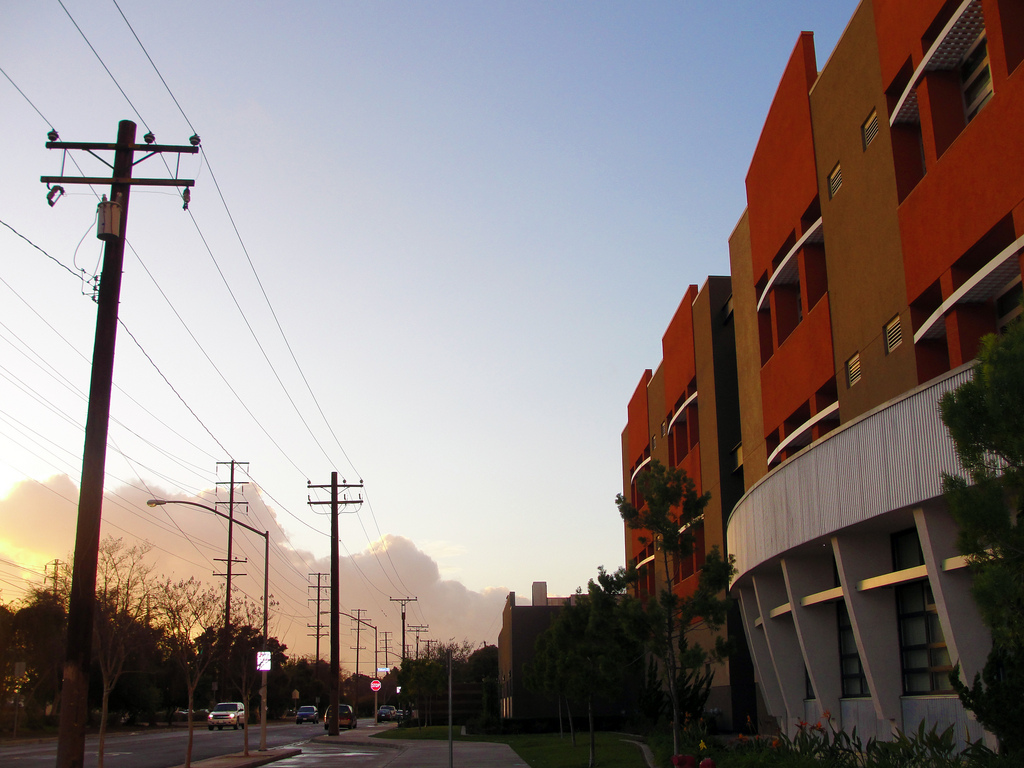
Maywood Academy High School along Randolph St

The curriculum of the high school is covered an athletic program consisting of:

- Baseball
- Basketball
- Cross Country
- Soccer
- Softball
- Swimming
- Water Polo
- Volleyball

The school also has a music program which consists of:

- Beginning Band
- Advanced Band
- Keyboard
