= Sam Johnson (wide receiver) =

American football player (born 1964)

No. 89
- Position: Wide receiver

Personal information
- Born: September 7, 1964 (age 62); East Los Angeles, California, U.S.
- Listed height: 5 ft 11 in (1.80 m)
- Listed weight: 180 lb (82 kg)

Career information
- High school: South Gate (South Gate, California)
- College: Prairie View A&M
- NFL draft: 1987: undrafted

Career history
- Cleveland Browns (1987)*; Los Angeles Rams (1987)
- * Offseason or practice squad member only
- Stats at Pro Football Reference

Samuel Johnson (born September 7, 1964) is an American former professional football wide receiver who played one season with the Los Angeles Rams of the National Football League (NFL). He played college football at Los Angeles Southwest College and Prairie View A&M University.

== Early life and college ==
Samuel Johnson was born on September 7, 1964, in East Los Angeles, California. He attended South Gate High School in South Gate, California.

Johnson first played college football at Los Angeles Southwest College and earned All-Southern California Conference honors. His final year at Los Angeles Southwest was in 1985. He then transferred to play for the Prairie View A&M of Prairie View A&M University in 1986.

== Professional career ==
Johnson signed with the Cleveland Browns after going undrafted in the 1987 NFL draft. He was released on August 2, 1987.

On September 23, 1987, Johnson was signed by the Los Angeles Rams during the 1987 NFL players strike. He played in three games, starting one, for the Rams and returned four punts for negative four yards while fumbling twice. He was released on October 19, 1987, after the strike ended. He stood 5'11" and weighed 180 pounds. Johnson wore jersey number 89 with the Rams.
