= Bell High School (California) =

Coordinates: 33°58′27.5″N 118°11′24″W

Location
- 4328 Bell Avenue; Bell, Los Angeles, California 90201; United States

Information
- Type: Public
- Motto: Honor Lies In Honest Toil
- Established: October 23, 1925
- School district: Los Angeles Unified School District
- Principal: Felipe Barragan
- Teaching staff: 107.86 (FTE)
- Grades: 9–12
- Enrollment: 2,351 (2022–23)
- Student to teacher ratio: 21.80
- Colors: Purple; Gold
- Mascot: The Eagle
- Rival: Huntington Park High School
- Newspaper: The Bell Chimes
- Website: bellhs.lausd.org

Bell High School is a public high school in Bell, California, United States. The school, which serves grades 9 through 12, is a part of District 6 of the Los Angeles Unified School District. Bell High’s motto is "Honor lies in honest toil", its mascot is the eagle, and the school colors are purple and gold. They are rivals with the Huntington Park Spartans.

The school serves several municipalities. The school serves the cities of Bell, Cudahy, and Maywood, and it serves portions of Huntington Park and portions of Vernon. Some portions of Huntington Park and Maywood are jointly zoned to both Bell High School and Huntington Park High School.

== History ==
Bell High School began as the Bell Unit of the Huntington Park Union High School, and opened with two classes, freshmen and sophomores. There were 14 teachers and 325 students. Mr. Claude L. Reeves, a graduate from USC, was the first principal of Bell High School and he remained until 1939.

It was in the Los Angeles City High School District until 1961, when it merged into LAUSD.

Located in the Southeastern section of Los Angeles County, Bell High School is a comprehensive high school (grades 9-12) serving 5,375 (2006–2007) students from the tri-communities of Bell, Cudahy, and Maywood. One of six high schools in Local District 6, and one of forty-nine comprehensive high schools in the Los Angeles Unified School District, Bell High School opened its doors in 1925 for 800 students.

In 2005, South East High School in South Gate opened, relieving Bell. In 2006, Maywood Academy High School opened.

== Sports ==
-Bell High School usually competes with neighboring schools Huntington Park, South Gate, Southeast, Jordan, James A. Garfield and Roosevelt High School. Bell's basketball team has won four 3-A city championships in Bell's 85 years of existence, with major help from Ernie Rojas the first coming in 1997 and the second in 2007 and in 2012 and most recently 2021, Bell's wrestling team has won five C.I.F. city championships, in 1993, 1994, 1996 2005, and 2018.

- Football
- Soccer
- Basketball
- Baseball
- Tennis
- Wrestling
- Volleyball
- United States Academic Decathlon
- Softball
- Cross-Country
- Track & Field
- Cheerleading
- Marching band
- Short Flags
- Color Guard
- Swimming

== Activities ==
The Bell High Marching Eagles consists of the Marching Band, Color Guard, Short Flags and Shields groups at Bell High School. They are known as "The Pride of the Southeast" of the southeast Los Angeles Area. In 1980, Bell High Short Flags were honored to participate in the International Carnival of Mazatlán, Sinaloa.

== Notable alumni ==
- Tom Araya, singer/Bassist, Slayer
- B-Real, rapper, Cypress Hill
- Marvin Benard, former MLB player (San Francisco Giants)
- Tony Campos, bassist, "Static-X"
- John Ferraro, U.S. politician
- George Gascón, U.S. politician, prosecutor, policeman
- Tom Harrison, former MLB player (Kansas City Athletics)
- Mike Henry, NFL Linebacker, Actor (M*A*S*H)
- Anwar Jibawi, Actor/YouTuber
- Gary Jones, former MLB player (New York Yankees)
- Steve Jones, former MLB player (Chicago White Sox, Washington Senators, Kansas City Royals)
- Stan Kenton, jazz Musician
- Mike Lee, former MLB player (Cleveland Indians, Los Angeles Angels)
- Bobby Magallanes, MLB coach (Atlanta Braves)
- Ever Magallanes, former MLB player (Cleveland Indians)
- Mellow Man Ace, rapper
- Buddy Pritchard, former MLB player (Pittsburgh Pirates)
- Ruben Quesada, writer and community organizer
- Larry Ramos, The New Christy Minstrels & The Association, singer/musician
- Miguel "Meegs" Rascon, guitarist, "Coal Chamber"
- Herman Reich, former MLB player (Cleveland Indians, Washington Senators, Chicago Cubs)
- Ed "Big Daddy" Roth, cartoonist and hot-rod icon
- Rip Russell, former MLB player (Chicago Cubs, Boston Red Sox)
- Sen Dog, rapper, Cypress Hill
- Dennis Cleveland Stewart, Actor/Dancer
- Leon White, professional wrestler known as Big Van Vader
- Darrell Woodard, former MLB player (Oakland Athletics)
