= Christie Repasy =

American painter

- Born: December 19, 1958 (age 67); Maywood, California
- Education: Irvine Valley College
- Known for: Painting, floral
- Movement: Shabby chic Traditional
- Website: ChristieRepasy.com

Christie Repasy (born December 19, 1958) is an American floral artist from Maywood, California. She is best known for her Victorian style and floral-painted furniture.

== Early life and education ==
Repasy has been painting since she was in the second grade. By age 14, she was painting furniture for friends and neighbors. Her first award was winning a high-school art contest, at Edison High School in Huntington Beach, California. She continued painting soft, French-inspired roses on canvas and furniture. She studied oil painting at Irvine Valley College under artist Chris Gwaltney.

== Career ==
She started selling her pieces at age 28. She uses vintage frames and ceiling-fan tiles for framing.

Her painted furniture and technique were included in an autumn 2010 cover story in Stampington & Company's Somerset Home magazine. She has been featured in four issues of Romantic Homes Magazine, February 2004, February 2009, October 2010 and spring 2011 editions. She was included in a short story and photo in spring 2011 and mentioned in March 2008 issues of Romantic Country Magazine.

In March 2006, the Orange County Register wrote an article about how she applies shabby chic in her works. In 2012, Today's Vintage Magazine wrote about Repasy's original artwork in a "Spotlight" article.

She has painted floral designs on antique and vintage pieces of furniture discovered at flea markets, which become pieces of art. HGTV, in a 2004 interview for its "Country Style" show, included in an article on its site that Repasy's "timeless flower paintings hang in homes around the country." She also appeared on Rachel Ashwell's Shabby Chic show on the Style Network. Repasy's work has been compared to that of artist Paul De Longpre.

Repasy's art has shown at the Laguna Beach Art Festival and she also participated in its 75th anniversary festival.

== Personal life ==
She hosts Chateau de Fleurs, a quarterly marketplace of artisans, at her home in Fallbrook, California. She also has a home and studio in Laguna Beach.
