= Maywood, California =

City in California, United States

- City
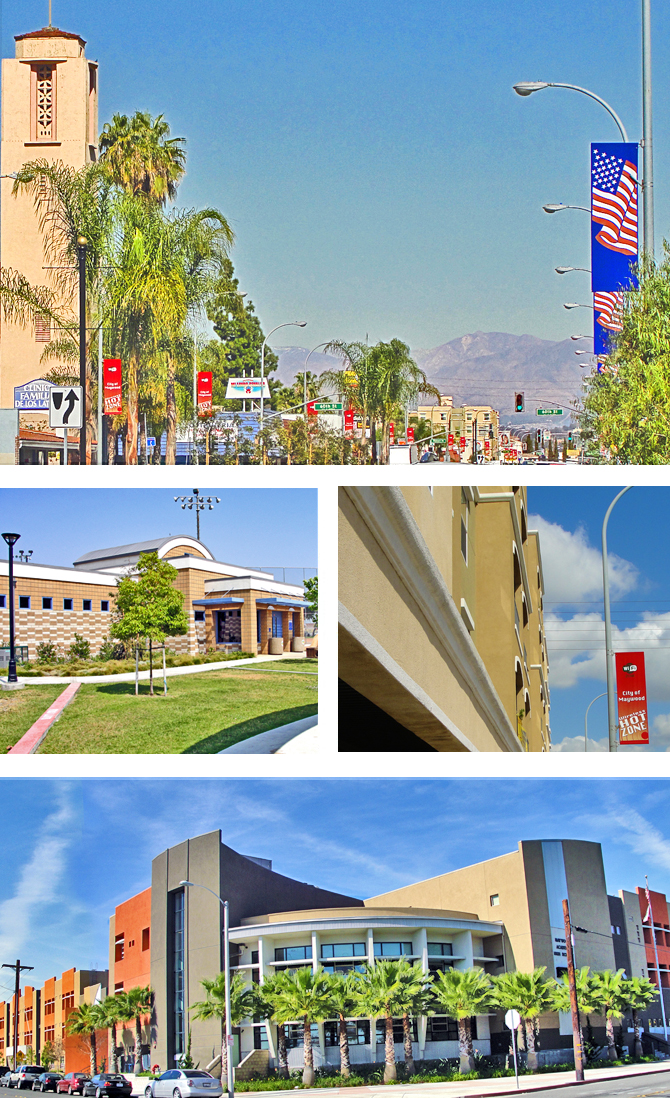
- Images, from top, left to right: Slauson Ave, Swimming Pool, Retirement Home, Maywood High School

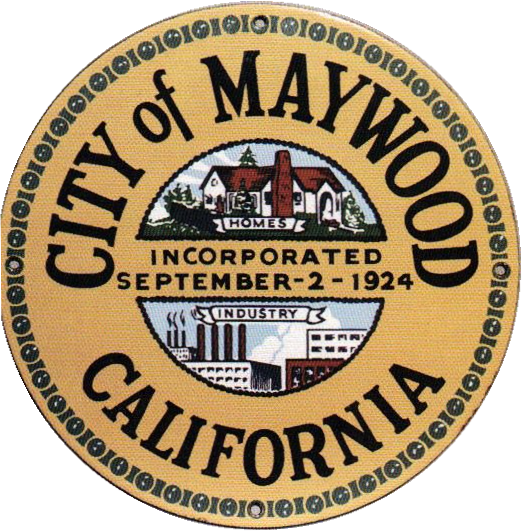
- Seal Logo
- Interactive map of Maywood, California
- Location within the Greater Los Angeles Location within California Location in the United States
- Coordinates: 33°59′16″N 118°11′12″W
- Country: United States
- State: California
- County: Los Angeles
- Incorporated: September 2, 1924

Government
  - Mayor: Herber Marquez
  - Mayor Pro Tem: Jaime Flores
  - City Council: Eddie De La Riva; Frank Garcia; Mayra Aguiluz
  - City Manager: Jennifer E. Vasquez

Area
  - Total: 1.18 sq mi (3.05 km^{2})
  - Land: 1.18 sq mi (3.05 km^{2})
  - Water: 0 sq mi (0.00 km^{2}) 0%
- Elevation: 151 ft (46 m)

Population (2020)
  - Total: 25,138
  - Density: 21,300/sq mi (8,240/km^{2})
- Time zone: UTC-8 (PST)
  - Summer (DST): UTC-7 (PDT)
- ZIP Code: 90270
- Area code: 213 / 323
- FIPS code: 06-46492
- GNIS feature ID: 1661000
- Website: www.cityofmaywood.com

Maywood is a city in Los Angeles County, California, United States. A gateway city, at 1.18 square miles (3.1 km^{2}) Maywood is the third-smallest incorporated city in Los Angeles County by area. It is bordered by the cities of Bell on the south, Vernon on the north and west, Huntington Park on the southwest, and Commerce on the east.

As of July 1, 2010, Maywood became the first municipality in California to outsource all of its city services, dismantling its police department, laying off all city employees except for the city manager, city attorney and elected officials, and contracting with outside agencies for the provision of all municipal services. The population was 25,138 at the 2020 census.

== History ==
The land on which Maywood stands had been populated by Native American tribes for centuries. The area that would later become Maywood was deeded in 1781 by the Spanish monarchy to Spanish War veteran Manuel Nieto. When the settlement of Pueblo de Nuestra Senora de Los Angeles was recorded, it included the cow pasture (now Maywood) that eventually turned into a rancho.

In 1919, May Wood, a popular young woman who worked for the real estate corporation developing the 2,300 acres (930 hectares) ranch into home tracts, agreed to lend her name to the property. The development of Maywood later survived a bitter challenge to dissolve the prospective city in early 1924.

The Chrysler Corporation had an auto assembly plant in Maywood from the 1920s until its closing in July 1971. It was located at 5800 Eastern Avenue at Slauson, and was generally referred to as the "Los Angeles" Plant. When the city of Commerce was incorporated in 1961, that corner was annexed as were several in the surrounding area.

Maywood Assembly was a Ford Motor Company assembly plant also located in Maywood, that operated from 1948 until 1957. The address was 5801 S. Eastern Avenue, and it was across the street from the Chrysler Assembly factory, and exclusively built Lincoln and Mercury vehicles. The factory was closed and demolished when operations at Maywood and Long Beach were combined into a new factory in Pico Rivera in 1958.

Willys-Overland built its California factory in Maywood, California, in 1929 at the current location of 6201 Randolph Street. Over 900 people were employed at the new $1.5 million assembly plant. Willys-Overland became the second automobile manufacturer to build a major plant in the city. After the United States entered World War II, automobile production for civilians was phased out and in November 1941, automobile assembly at Maywood was stopped. A great many automobile plants were retooled to manufacture war machinery and for three years during the war, the Lockheed Aircraft Corporation rented the plant building from Willys-Overland for that purpose. Equipment was installed for the manufacture of sub-assemblies for Hudson Bombers until the war ended. Willys-Overland began to manufacture the first Jeeps (CJ-2As) for civilians in 1945. As the demand for Jeeps increased, the reconditioning of the plant back to automobile assembly began early in 1947 and by November, Willys was building "West Coast" CJ-2As. By the end of November, 108 Jeeps had been assembled. Jeep Trucks and Station Wagons were incorporated into the West Coast Division's "final assemblies" production lines in 1948. The Maywood plant produced the entire CJ-3A model production duration and about 5% of all CJ-3As were assembled in California. In 1952, Willys-Overland introduced a new post-war model car, the Aero, and they were assembled in both Maywood and Toledo. The entire plant was shut down in 1954.

=== 2010 city layoffs ===
Maywood officials were given notice in June 2009 that the city would lose its insurance coverage unless they implemented a 20-point performance plan. Maywood also owed the California Insurance Authority $927,135 and had been making interest-only payments. Mainly because of the troubled history, including multiple lawsuits, and the dubious reputation of the Maywood Police Department, the city's Liability and Workers Compensation insurer notified the city in August 2009, that it would cancel its coverage effective July 1, 2010. When the city was unable to find coverage elsewhere, it disbanded its police department, laid off all city employees, except for the city manager, city attorney and elected officials, and contracted with other agencies to provide all municipal services.

An outside audit found that Maywood was losing approximately $620,000 annually from its $10 million general fund budget under the previous seven-year contract with nearby Cudahy, because they had neglected to bill Cudahy for administration, vehicle maintenance or insurance. The firm concluded that Maywood was losing about $620,000 a year, or a total of about $4 million in the last six years. George Perez, Cudahy's city manager, said Maywood's "politics have been getting in the way." Perez said that he and Paul Philips, then acting Maywood City Manager, would agree on a new contract, but the Maywood City Council would then send Philips back for further negotiation. Perez said that negotiations disintegrated in February, after Philips resigned.

Councilman Felipe Aguirre said, "We don't want to file for bankruptcy. We don't want to disappear as a city." Aguirre said filing for bankruptcy was not an option for Maywood because its problems were related specifically to insurance coverage. Several cities in the state have said that they are close to bankruptcy because of the sharp drop in sales and property tax revenues caused by the deepest recession in decades. During a heated City Council meeting in June 2010, opponents of the plan accused council members of mismanaging the city by failing to maintain insurance coverage. Under the plan adopted by the City Council that night, council members would continue to be paid to set policy, but all services would be contracted out. "You single-handedly destroyed the city," Lizeth Sandoval, the city treasurer, told the City Council. Sandoval, a city employee, spoke out as a private citizen, and was laid off as part of the cuts.

Though Maywood officials stopped short of filing for bankruptcy or even giving up the city's municipal status, the city still faces a serious problem with a huge deficit. The city did keep a few employees as independent contractors when they outsourced most city functions to Bell and police duties to the Los Angeles County Sheriff's Department. In September 2010, the troubled nearby city of Bell agreed to cancel the contract to handle the day-to-day operations of neighboring Maywood. Maywood has been overrun with political crises, from recalls to a city clerk accused of trying to contract a hit man to kill Councilman Aguirre. In early 2006, a newly elected Aguirre called Maywood a "sanctuary city" for illegal immigrants, stating: "I think we needed to amplify the debate by saying that no human being is illegal. These people are here ... making your clothes, shining your shoes and taking care of your kids. And now you want to develop this hypocritical policy?" "Maywood's actions have made the town a lightning rod for criticism on conservative radio shows and websites."

== Geography ==
According to the United States Census Bureau, the city has a total area of 1.2 square miles (3.1 km^{2}), all land.

It is 8 miles (13 km) southeast from Downtown Los Angeles Financial District and only 2 miles (3.2 km) east of the Los Angeles city limit on Slauson Ave and Alameda St in the Central-Alameda neighborhood. Maywood is part of the Gateway Cities region of southeastern Los Angeles County area. Maywood is bordered by the city of Bell on the south, Vernon on the north and west, Huntington Park on the southwest, and Commerce on the east.

=== Climate ===
The climate in the city of Maywood is very warm during summer when high temperatures tend to be in the 80s and mild during winter when high temperatures tend to be in the 60s. The warmest month of the year is August with an average maximum temperature of 89.40 °F (31.89 °C), while the coldest month of the year is December with an average minimum temperature of 47.30 °F (8.50 °C). Temperature variations between night and day tend to be moderate during summer with a difference that can reach 24 °F (−4 °C), and moderate during winter with an average difference of 22 °F (−6 °C). The annual average precipitation at Maywood is 15.07 inches (383 mm). The wettest month of the year is February with an average rainfall of 3.75 inches (95 mm). Maywood-area historical tornado activity is significantly above California state average. It is 75% smaller than the overall U.S. average. On November 7, 1966, a category 2 (max. wind speeds 113-157 mph) tornado 6.2 miles (10.0 km) away from the Maywood city center injured 10 people and caused between $50,000 and $500,000 in damages.

== Demographics ==
Historical population
Census	Pop.	Note	%±
1930	6,794		—
1940	10,731		57.9%
1950	13,292		23.9%
1960	14,588		9.8%
1970	16,996		16.5%
1980	21,810		28.3%
1990	27,850		27.7%
2000	28,083		0.8%
2010	27,395		−2.4%
2020	25,138		−8.2%
U.S. Decennial Census; 1860–1870 1880-1890; 1900 1910 1920; 1930 1940 1950; 1960 1970 1980; 1990 2000 2010; 2020

Maywood was first listed as a city in the 1930 U.S. Census as part of the now defunct San Antonio Township.

=== Racial and ethnic composition ===
Maywood city, California – Racial and ethnic composition Note: the US Census treats Hispanic/Latino as an ethnic category. This table excludes Latinos from the racial categories and assigns them to a separate category. Hispanics/Latinos may be of any race.
Race / Ethnicity (NH = Non-Hispanic)	Pop 1980	Pop 1990	Pop 2000	Pop 2010	Pop 2020	% 1980	% 1990	% 2000	% 2010	% 2020
White alone (NH)	3,699	1,568	739	498	361	16.96%	5.63%	2.63%	1.82%	1.44%
Black or African American alone (NH)	65	46	43	49	106	0.30%	0.17%	0.15%	0.18%	0.42%
Native American or Alaska Native alone (NH)	230	68	51	24	29	1.05%	0.24%	0.18%	0.09%	0.12%
Asian alone (NH)	233	148	85	61	80	1.07%	0.53%	0.30%	0.22%	0.32%
Native Hawaiian or Pacific Islander alone (NH)	233	148	25	14	1	1.07%	0.53%	0.09%	0.05%	0.00%
Other race alone (NH)	37	89	27	28	66	0.17%	0.31%	0.10%	0.10%	0.26%
Mixed race or Multiracial (NH)	x	x	62	25	95	x	x	0.22%	0.09%	0.38%
Hispanic or Latino (any race)	17,546	25,931	27,051	26,696	24,400	80.45%	93.11%	96.33%	97.45%	97.06%
Total	21,810	27,850	28,083	27,395	25,138	100.00%	100.00%	100.00%	100.00%	100.00%

=== 2020 census ===
As of the 2020 census, Maywood had a population of 25,138 and a population density of 21,448.8 inhabitants per square mile (8,281.4/km^{2}). The median age was 32.5 years. 26.9% of residents were under the age of 18 and 9.7% were 65 years of age or older. For every 100 females, there were 100.2 males, and for every 100 females age 18 and over, there were 97.9 males age 18 and over.

The census reported that 99.5% of the population lived in households, 0.1% lived in non-institutionalized group quarters, and 0.4% were institutionalized. 100.0% of residents lived in urban areas, while 0.0% lived in rural areas.

There were 6,558 households, of which 51.8% had children under the age of 18 living in them. Of all households, 47.8% were married-couple households, 10.0% were cohabiting couple households, 16.4% were households with a male householder and no spouse or partner present, and 25.8% were households with a female householder and no spouse or partner present. About 11.5% of households were made up of individuals, and 4.1% had someone living alone who was 65 years of age or older. The average household size was 3.81. There were 5,428 families (82.8% of all households).

There were 6,696 housing units at an average density of 5,713.3 units per square mile (2,205.9 units/km^{2}), of which 6,558 (97.9%) were occupied and 2.1% were vacant. Of occupied units, 29.7% were owner-occupied and 70.3% were occupied by renters. The homeowner vacancy rate was 0.3%, and the rental vacancy rate was 1.9%.

=== 2023 ACS 5-year estimate ===
In 2023, the US Census Bureau estimated that the median household income was $61,655, and the per capita income was $19,724. About 17.8% of families and 18.6% of the population were below the poverty line.

=== 2010 census ===
The 2010 United States census reported that Maywood had a population of 27,395. The population density was 23,247.5 inhabitants per square mile (8,975.9/km^{2}). The racial makeup of Maywood was 14,244 (52.0%) White (1.8% Non-Hispanic White), 166 (0.6%) African American, 208 (0.8%) Native American, 87 (0.3%) Asian, 20 (0.1%) Pacific Islander, 11,495 (42.0%) from other races, and 1,175 (4.3%) from two or more races. Hispanic or Latino of any race were 26,696 persons (97.4%).

The Census reported that 27,276 people (99.6% of the population) lived in households, 0 (0%) lived in non-institutionalized group quarters, and 119 (0.4%) were institutionalized.

There were 6,559 households, out of which 4,120 (62.8%) had children under the age of 18 living in them, 3,721 (56.7%) were opposite-sex married couples living together, 1,254 (19.1%) had a female householder with no husband present, 717 (10.9%) had a male householder with no wife present. There were 595 (9.1%) unmarried opposite-sex partnerships, and 32 (0.5%) same-sex married couples or partnerships. 599 households (9.1%) were made up of individuals, and 231 (3.5%) had someone living alone who was 65 years of age or older. The average household size was 4.16. There were 5,692 families (86.8% of all households); the average family size was 4.30.

The population was spread out, with 8,925 people (32.6%) under the age of 18, 3,402 people (12.4%) aged 18 to 24, 8,619 people (31.5%) aged 25 to 44, 4,807 people (17.5%) aged 45 to 64, and 1,642 people (6.0%) who were 65 years of age or older. The median age was 27.9 years. For every 100 females, there were 104.5 males. For every 100 females age 18 and over, there were 102.9 males.

There were 6,766 housing units at an average density of 5,741.6 units per square mile (2,216.8 units/km^{2}), of which 1,980 (30.2%) were owner-occupied, and 4,579 (69.8%) were occupied by renters. The homeowner vacancy rate was 1.2%; the rental vacancy rate was 2.6%. 9,245 people (33.7% of the population) lived in owner-occupied housing units and 18,031 people (65.8%) lived in rental housing units.

According to the 2010 United States census, Maywood had a median household income of $37,114, with 28.3% of the population living below the federal poverty line.

=== Mapping L.A. ===
Mapping L.A. reported that in 2000, Mexican (77.0%) and Salvadoran (3.6%) were the most common ancestries. Mexico (81.4%) and El Salvador (7.1%) were the most common foreign places of birth.

=== Immigrant population ===
A significant percentage of its residents work in the factories at nearby Vernon and Commerce. The city has been at the forefront of immigration debates. It is speculated that one- third of Maywood's residents population lives in the U.S. without documentation. The city, 96% of which is Latino, and more than half are foreign-born, has declared itself as a "Sanctuary City" for illegal immigrants.

=== Latino communities ===
These were the ten cities or neighborhoods in Los Angeles County with the largest percentage of Latino residents, according to the 2000 census:

1. East Los Angeles, California, 96.7%
2. Maywood, California, 96.4%
3. City Terrace, California, 94.4%
4. Huntington Park, California, 95.1%
5. Boyle Heights, Los Angeles, 94.0%
6. Cudahy, California, 93.8%
7. Bell Gardens, California, 93.7%
8. Commerce, California 93.4%
9. Vernon, California, 92.6%
10. South Gate, California, 92.1%

== Arts and culture ==
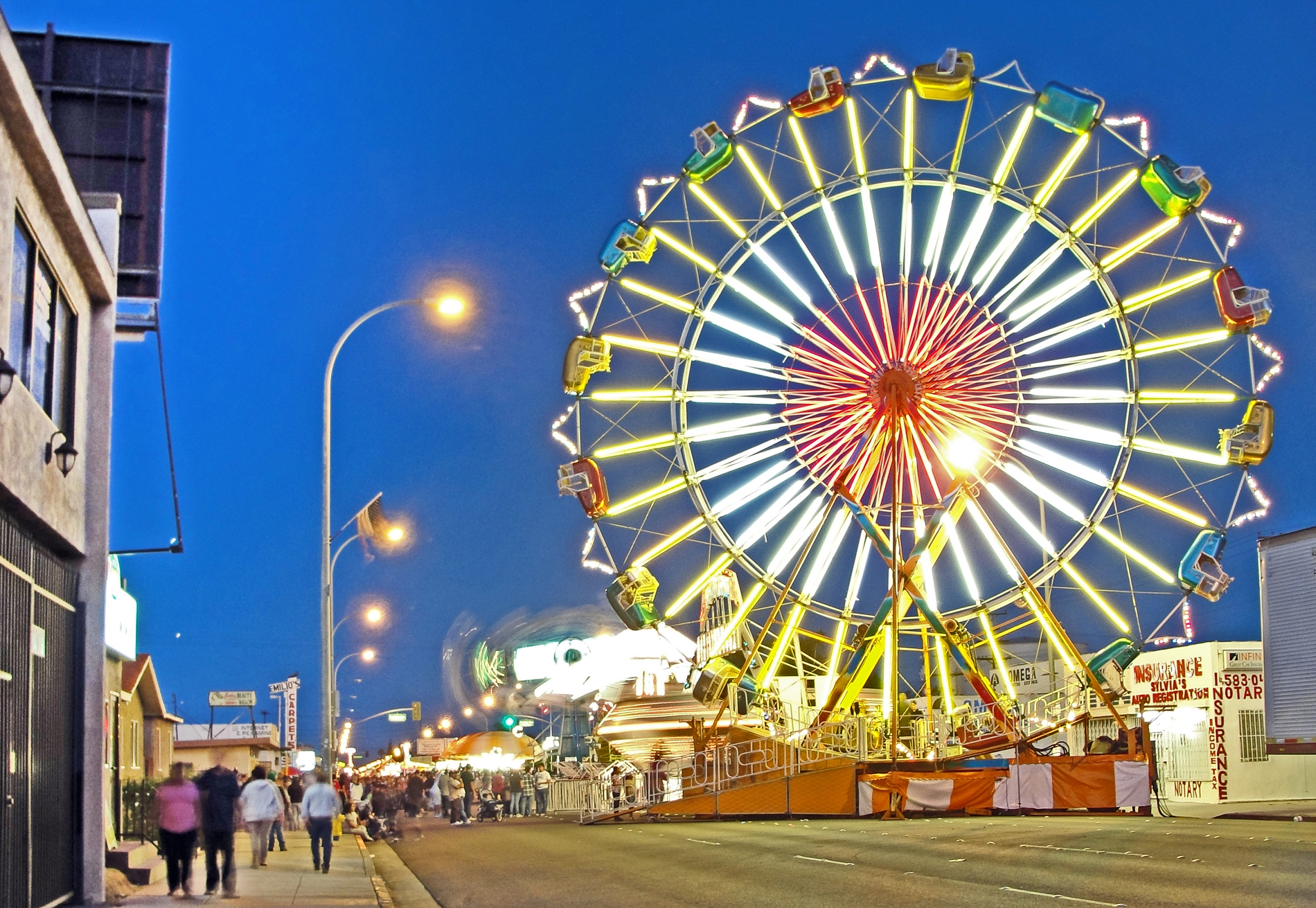
Street Fair

Every Memorial Day weekend the City of Maywood holds their annual Street Fair. It is a place where families, friends, and neighbors get together to experience a variety of food, music, games, raffles, rides, and multi-cultural activities. Street fair presale ride tickets will be available at City Hall until sold out. Location : On Slauson between Pine Avenue and Loma Vista Avenue In July 2010, over 600 people attended the First Annual July 4 Family Fun Day Celebration at the Maywood Activities Center, to honor the country's declaration of independence. For a couple of years the fair did not return until recently.

== Sports ==
The only sports team located in the city is the Maywood Buzz, which features former NBA star Cedric Ceballos. The team plays in the Maywood Activities Center, also known as the M.A.C. They are an ABA (American Basketball Association) team. Several famous baseball players have played at Maywood Park including former MLB player Marvin Benard, who attended local rival, Bell High School.

The ABA team, the Beijing Aoshen Olympians played their inaugural season at the M.A.C. during the 2005–2006 season. They reached the playoffs, but lost to the SoCal Legends in the Great Eight Tournament in Rochester. After the season, the Olympians relocated, and now play on the campus of Azusa Pacific University.

== Parks and recreation ==
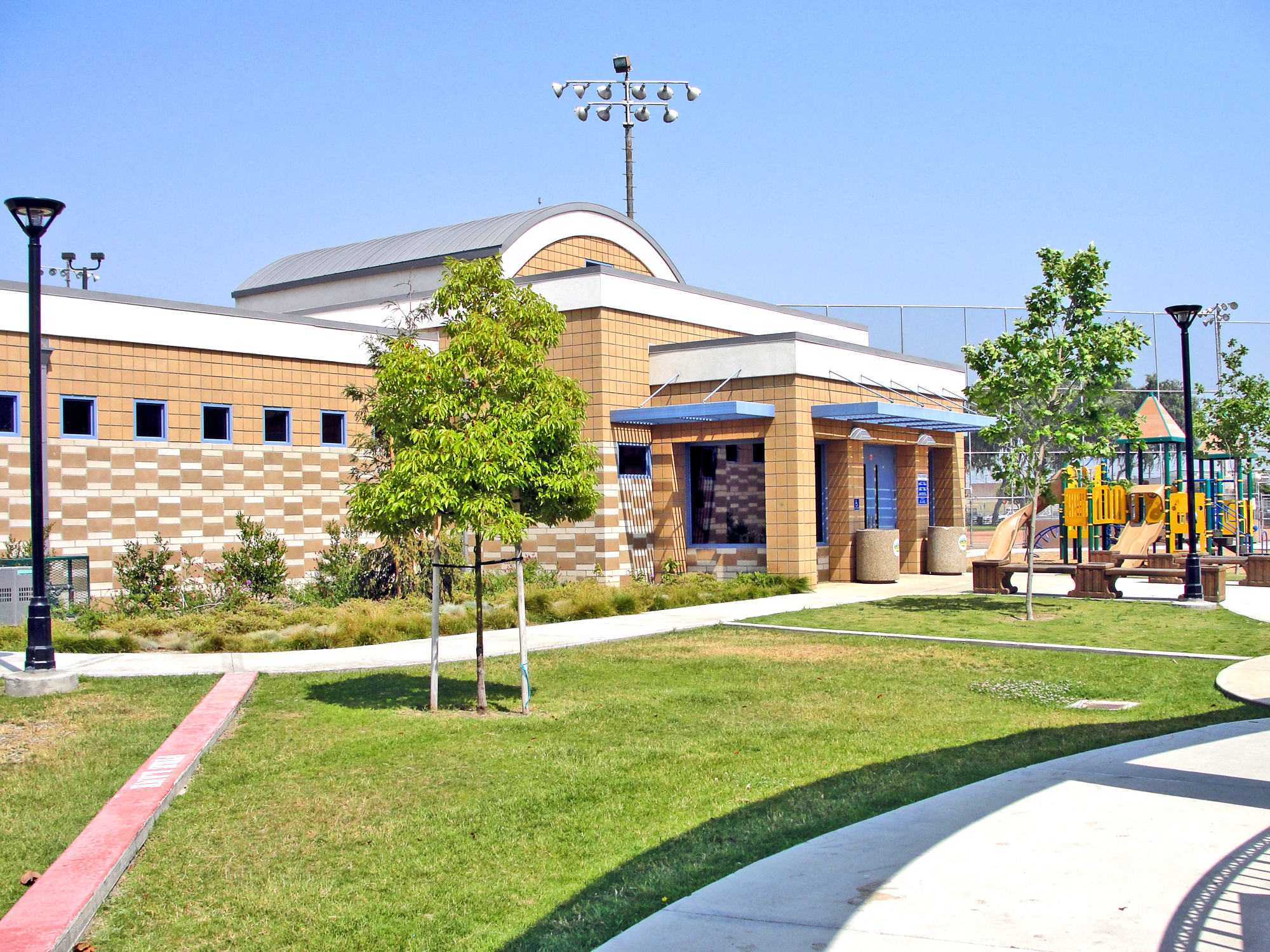
Maywood Park and Aquatic Center

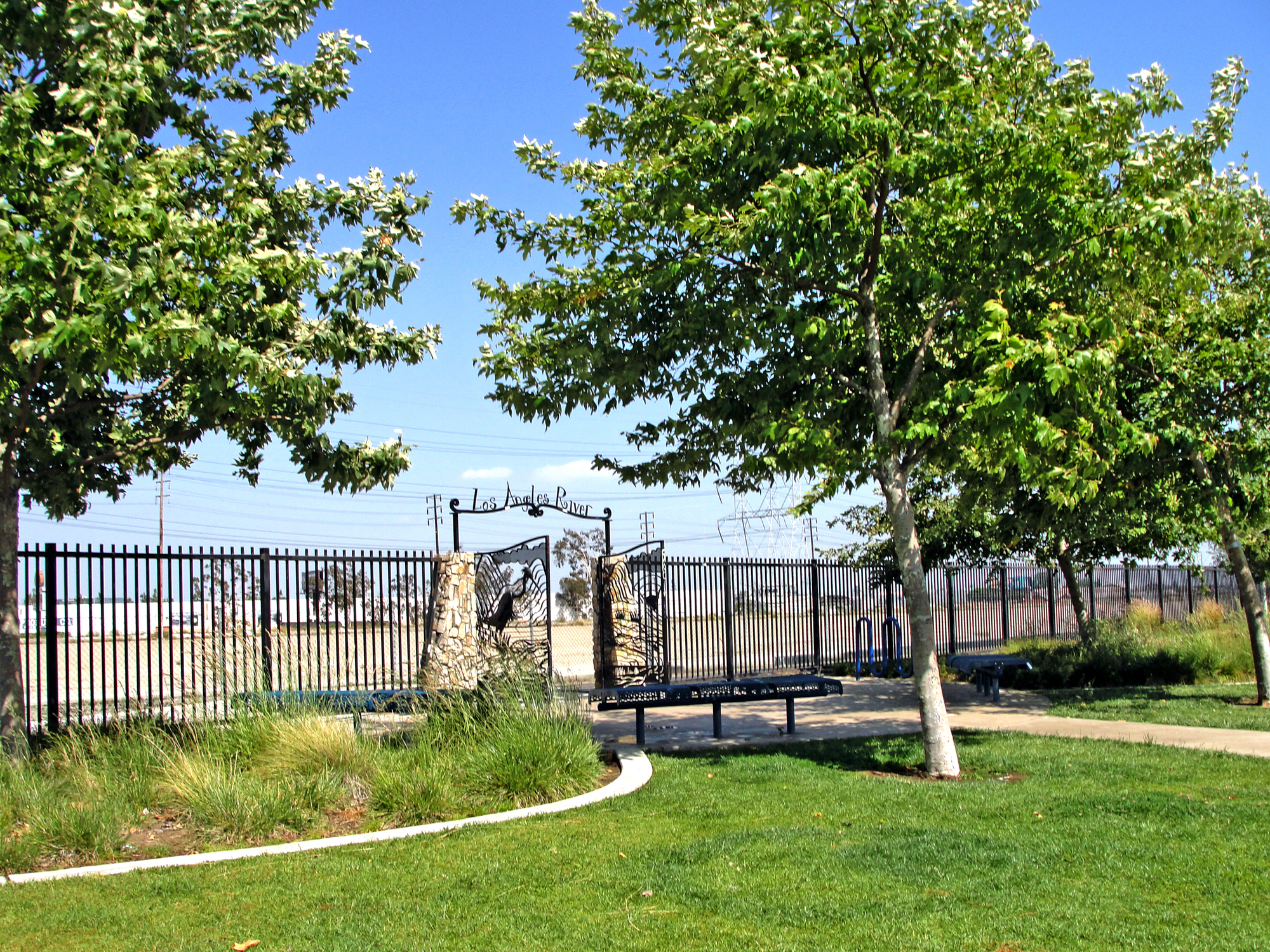
Access to Los Angeles River Bike Path at Riverfront Park

Maywood has two major parks and two small "pocket parks". The existing Maywood Park at 4801 E 58th Street and the new Maywood Riverfront Park at 5000 Slauson Avenue are currently the largest parks in the city, both are in the east side of the city. Maywood Park has a baseball field and the Maywood Activity Center, which opened in 1999. The Parks and Recreation Department currently maintains all of the parks in the city and offers many activities for all ages, seniors, adults and youth. Mr. Aldo Perez is Director of Parks and Recreation. The two pocket parks are Pixely Park and Pine Avenue Park.

The Maywood Activities Center (M.A.C.), is available for general public use and offers a wide variety of classes, specialty rooms, indoor basketball court, gymnasium, pool and place for clubs and classes to meet.

The Riverfront Park is located next to the Los Angeles River and has handball courts, a basketball court, and soccer field. It also includes an access pathway to the LA River Bike Path that travels through 40 miles (64 km) of Los Angeles County, including Griffith Park and Long Beach. A small pocket park is located in the west side of the city, Pixley Park at 3626 56th Street. Two small pocket parks were proposed to the city in 2008, Maywood Avenue Park and Pine Avenue Park are to be built in the future in the west side of the city. As the city reorganizes, future plans are on hold.

== Government ==
Maywood City Hall at Slauson and Fishburn Avenues, 1977

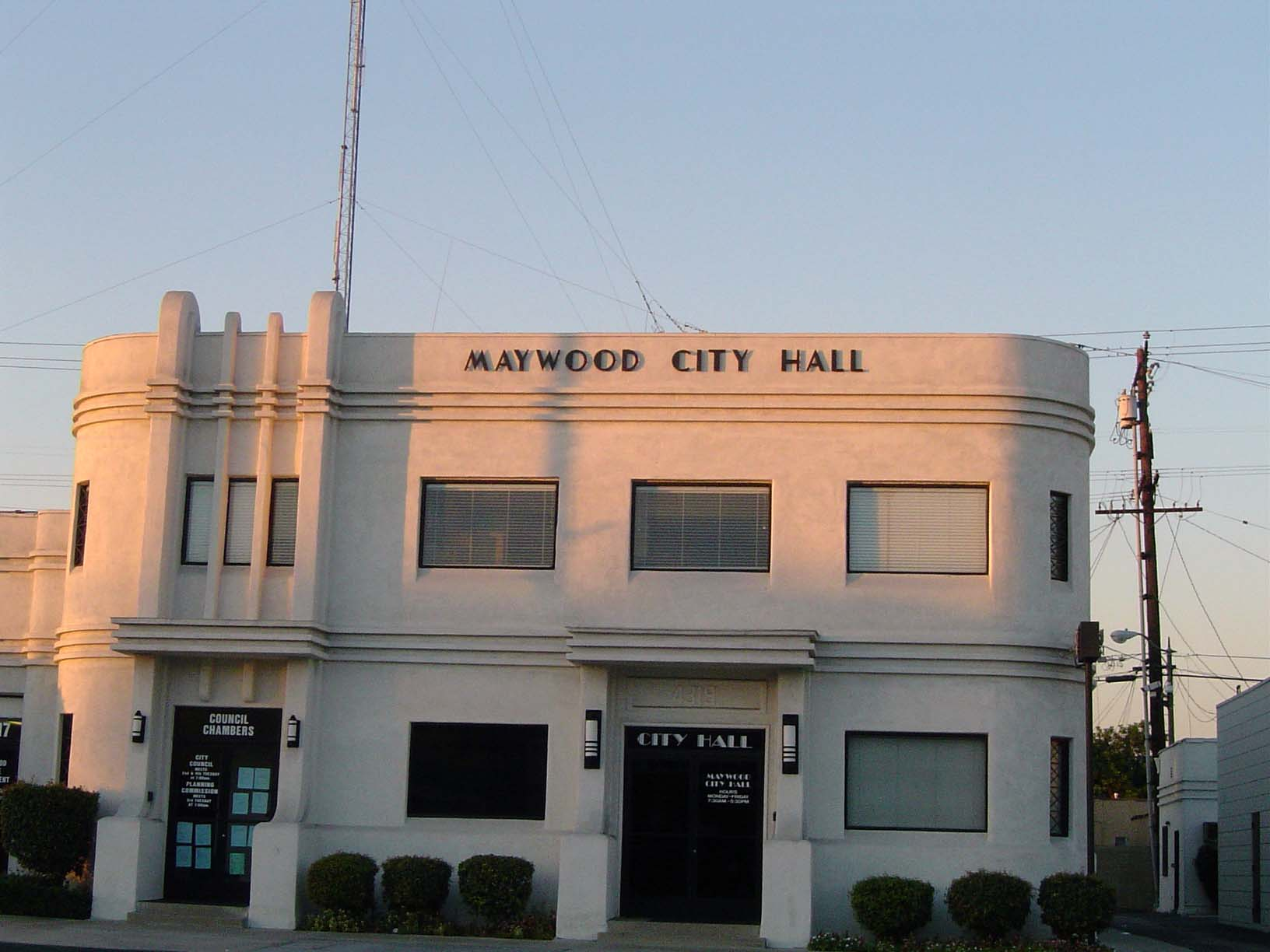
City Hall

=== Municipal government ===
As of 2025, the council consists of Mayor Mayra Aguiluz, Mayor Pro Tempore Heber Marquez, Councilmember Eddie De La Riva, Councilmember Frank Garcia and Councilmember Jaime Flores. The City of Maywood has Jennifer Vasquez as full-time City Manager.

=== County, state, and federal representation ===
In the Los Angeles County Board of Supervisors, Maywood is in the Fourth District, represented by Janice Hahn.

In the California State Legislature, Maywood is in the 33rd senatorial district, represented by Democrat Lena Gonzalez, and in the 62nd Assembly district, represented by Democrat Jose Solache.

In the United States House of Representatives, Maywood is in California's 42nd congressional district, represented by Democrat Robert Garcia.

== Education ==
=== K–12 schools ===
Maywood is a part of the Los Angeles Unified School District. The city has also joined South Gate, Huntington Park, Cudahy, Vernon, and Bell in the Southeast Cities School Coalition to improve the education of the children of the Southeast.

==== Public primary schools ====
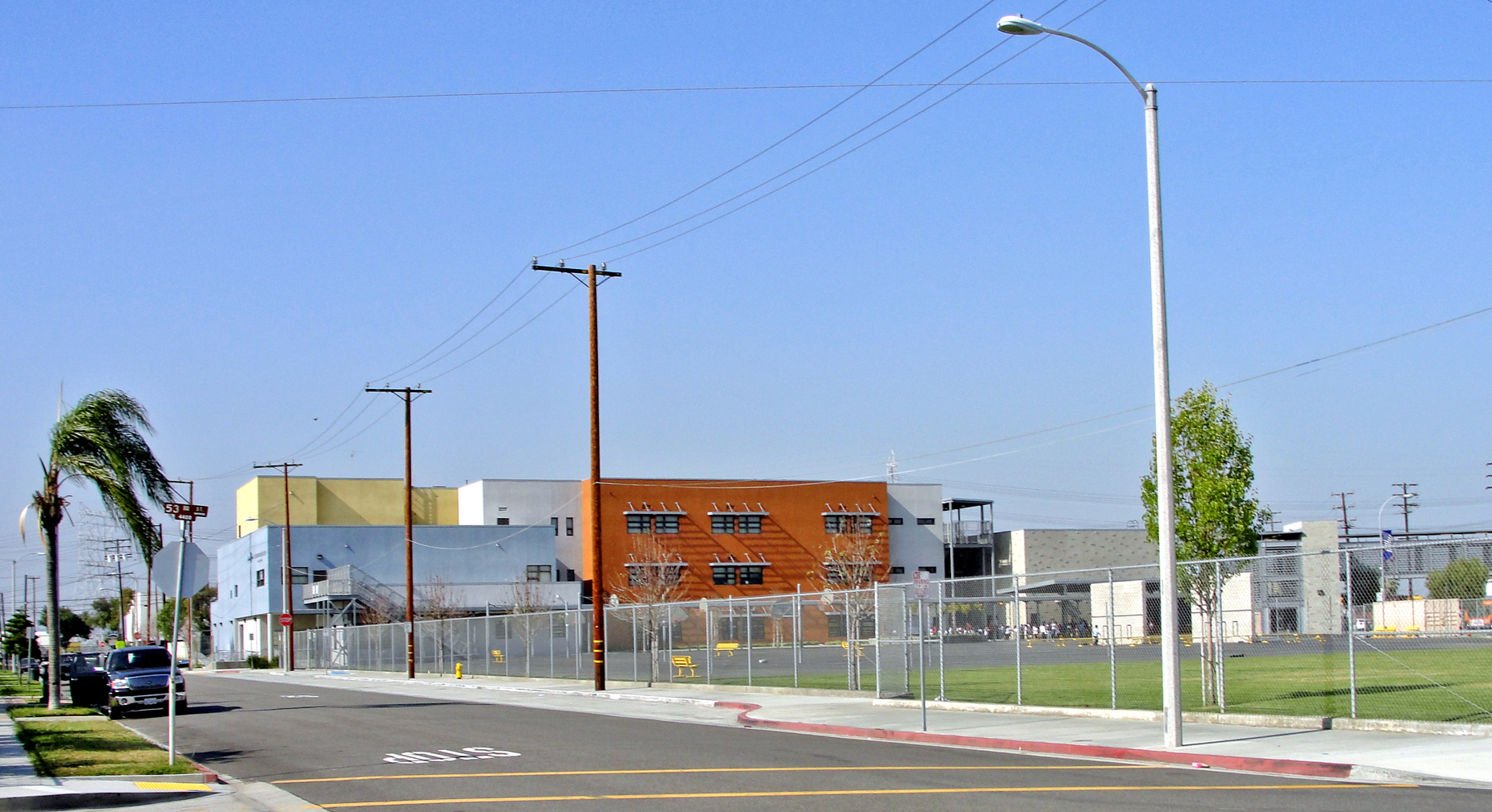
Maywood Elementary School

Public elementary schools in Maywood:

- Fishburn Avenue Elementary School
- Heliotrope Elementary School
- Loma Vista Elementary School
- Maywood Elementary School (opened 2005)

==== Public secondary schools ====
Public secondary schools located in Maywood:

- Maywood Academy High School

=== Private schools ===
Private schools include Maywood Christian School (K–12), an independent private school, Betania Christian School (1–12), an independent private school, and St. Rose of Lima School (K-8) of the Roman Catholic Archdiocese of Los Angeles.

== Infrastructure ==
Fire protection in Maywood is provided by the Los Angeles County Fire Department. Ambulance transport is provided by Care Ambulance Service. The Los Angeles County Sheriff's Department will continue to provide police and aerial support to the city of Maywood.

The Los Angeles County Department of Health Services operates the Whittier Health Center in Whittier, serving Maywood.

=== Law enforcement ===
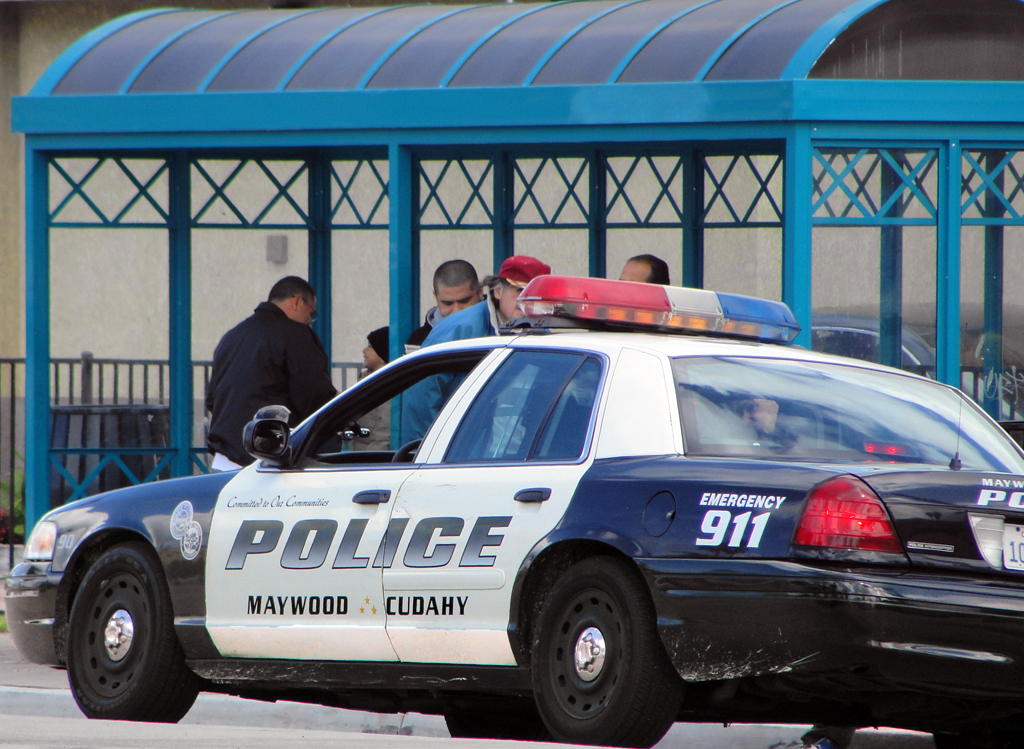
Maywood Cudahy Police vehicle

The Maywood Police Department was established in 1924 and disbanded in 2010. At its end, Maywood PD had approximately 40 sworn officers that covered the cities of Maywood and Cudahy. In 2007, Maywood PD was cited by local newspapers and media as having a reputation for also hiring officers that had been terminated from other agencies for misconduct or other legal issues. It then had one of the lowest median salaries for police officers in California.

Due to financial strain resulting from the Great Recession, the Maywood City Council disbanded the Maywood Police Department effective July 1, 2010. The entire police staff was laid off and police services were outsourced to the Los Angeles County Sheriff's Department.

=== Transportation ===
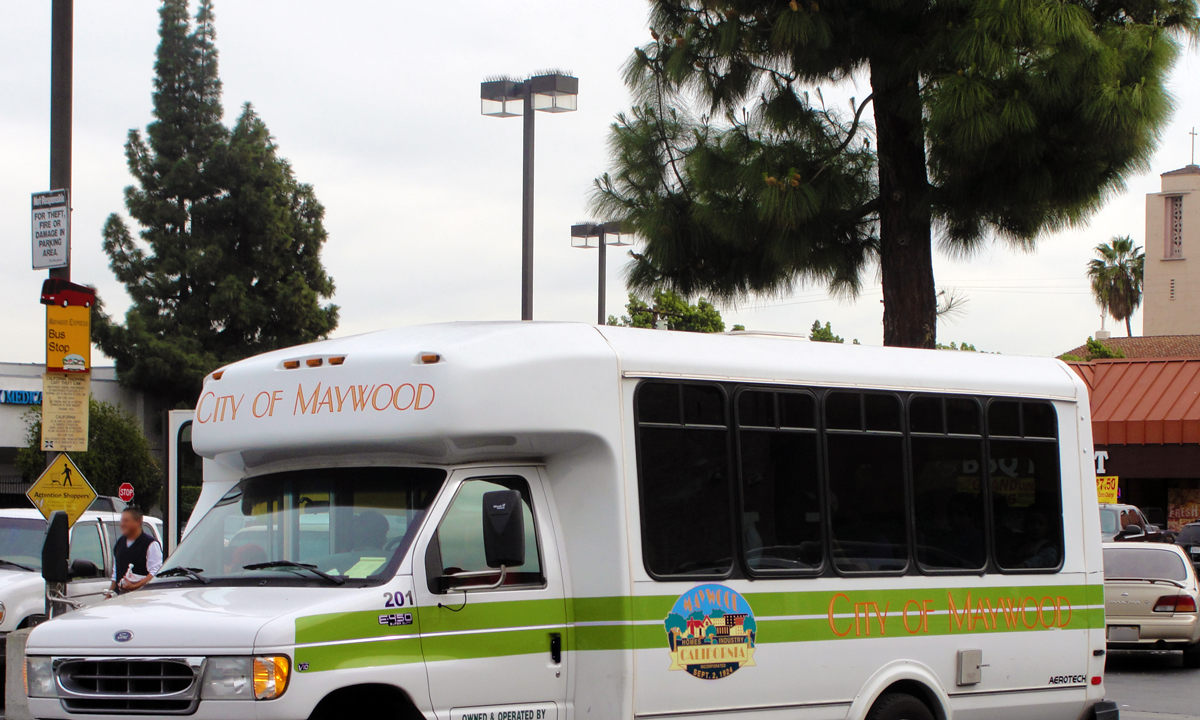
Maywood Express bus

The city can be reached by Atlantic Boulevard which runs north and south through the city and Slauson Avenue which runs east and west through the city. Maywood is also accessible via the Interstate 710 on Atlantic Boulevard. Los Angeles County Metropolitan Transportation Authority (Metro) provides bus services to the city, Metro Local Line 108 on Slauson Avenue. Metro Local Line 260 on Atlantic Boulevard. Metro Shuttle Line 611 runs through the westside and northside of the city.

The city of Maywood also operates a local bus service to its residents called Dial-a-Ride. The shuttles pick up residents at their location and transports them within the city limits for a one way fee of $1.00. The service is free to senior citizens, age 62 and over, and handicapped individuals. Seniors and the handicapped must come to City Hall to pick up their free pass. Effective January 2, 2013, the City of Maywood will no longer provide Dial-A-Ride service to the general public. Dial-A-Ride service will only be available to City of Maywood residents 62 years and over or those with a physician-certified disability which prohibits the use of public transportation. Individuals requiring special assistance will be permitted to have an attendant accompany them.

== Economy ==
Some lemon groves are planted here. Unfortunately, similar to the surrounding area the Asian Citrus Psyllid (ACP) is an invasive pest of these trees. Fortunately this area is a good environment for a parasitoid which controls ACP, Tamarixia radiata. This wasp is being intentionally introduced to the state to control ACP, but Maywood is so hospitable that Tamarixia has colonized the area without the need for human help. See Asian Citrus Psyllid in California.

== Notable people ==
- Larry Anderson - professional baseball player, 1972–75, pitched for both the Chicago White Sox and the Milwaukee Brewers
- Tom Araya - bassist and vocalist for the band Slayer
- Scott Autrey - professional motorcycle speedway racer, part of the USA team that won the 1982 Speedway World Team Cup
- Jack Brohamer - former professional baseball player; played for Cleveland, Chicago White Sox and Boston in a career that spanned from 1972 to 1980; in 1977 he hit for the cycle for the White Sox.
- Todd Burns - former professional baseball player for the Oakland Athletics
- Jim Messina - songwriter, singer, guitarist, recording engineer, and record producer; half of rock duo Loggins and Messina and prior to that a member of Buffalo Springfield and Poco.
- Dana Plato - actress, best known as Kimberly Drummond on Diff'rent Strokes (1978–1986)
- Christie Repasy - American floral artist
- Ed Roth - American hot rod builder, fabricator, enthusiast
- Danny Trejo - American actor known for his large body of work as a character actor
- Robert S. Woods - actor, played character Bo Buchanan on the ABC daytime drama "One Life to Live"

== See also ==
- Cheli Air Force Station
