= International Association of Language Centres =

The International Association of Language Centres (IALC) was founded in 1983 as a non-profit organization to accredit and represent independent language schools teaching the official language of their country.

There are currently over 140 IALC accredited schools in 26 countries worldwide: Argentina, Australia, Austria, Brazil, Canada, China, Colombia, France, Germany, Ireland, Italy, Japan, Jordan, Latvia, Malta, Mexico, New Zealand, Portugal, Russia, South Africa, South Korea, Spain, Taiwan, United Arab Emirates, United Kingdom and USA. The 11 languages taught by IALC schools are: Arabic, Chinese (Mandarin), English, French, German, Italian, Japanese, Korean, Portuguese, Russian and Spanish.

Since their creation in 1983, IALC have been cementing their reputation as an essential business forum for independently operated language teaching institutions.

== The IALC Accreditation ==
All IALC language schools are inspected prior to joining the association, then they are inspected as part of the Quality Audit every four years, and continuously monitored. Not only does it insist that all member schools are inspected by relevant national accreditation schemes, it also runs its own inspections as part of a thorough quality assurance process. The IALC Code of Ethics is one of the standards that member language schools have to comply with. The IALC Quality Scheme ensures all standards are met and exceeded.

== IALC Workshop ==
The Annual IALC Workshop gathers decision makers from the language travel industry: IALC member schools, and educations agents. It is hosted each year by one of IALC's members and is sponsored by IALC schools and by exhibitors working with the language travel industry. It follows IALC's Annual General Meeting and features seminars, two days of one to one business appointments, and three major evening events: the Welcome Reception, the School Party and the Gala Dinner.

The IALC Workshop is known in the language travel industry as an "essential business forum for independently-operated language teaching institutions". The 2026 IALC Workshop will be held in Salerno, Italy. There will be over 4000 pre-scheduled educator and agent appointments, plus many more informal meetings at IALC's unique networking events.

== IALC Approved Agencies ==
IALC Approved Agencies are established, professional, language and study travel agencies. In order to join the scheme, an agency must demonstrate that it has developed successful partnerships with three IALC members in the preceding 12 months before their application.
