= Elizabeth Learning Center =

Location
- 4811 Elizabeth Street; Cudahy, California 90201; United States; 33.9632°N 118.1832°W

Information
- Former name: Elizabeth Learning Center
- Type: Public School
- Established: 1900s
- School district: Los Angeles Unified School District
- Principal: BLANCA TETITLA
- Enrollment: 1,783 (2015-16)
- Colors: Navy blue grey and White
- Mascot: Bulldog
- Nickname: ELC
- Website: elizabethlc.lausd.org

Elizabeth Learning Center (formerly Elizabeth Street Elementary School) is a PreK-12 public school in Cudahy, California, United States. It is part of the Los Angeles Unified School District. The high school (grades 9–12) contains two California Partnership Academies, the 'Health Academy', and 'InfoTech Academy'.

== History ==
The school was originally built in the early 1900s as Elizabeth Street Elementary School. The school was named after Elizabeth Cudahy, daughter of the city's founder Pancho Cudahy. Elizabeth Learning Center is currently a pre-K through 12th grade SPAN school, and is part of the Los Angeles Unified School District.

== Athletics ==
The school's athletic department consists of the following teams:

- Baseball
- Basketball
- Cross Country
- Soccer
- Softball
- Volleyball
- Tennis

== Clubs/Academic Teams/Associations ==
- Academic Decathlon (competitive)
- Debate Team (competitive)
- HOSA
- DECA (competitive)
- ELCAA (Elizabeth Learning Center Alumni Association)
- Virtual Business
- Robotics Club
- Photography Club (The Click)
- Bridge Club
- Travel Club
- Leadership
