= ELearning Credits =

UK government funding stream for education

eLearning Credits (or eLCs) was a government initiative in the UK which put money aside for schools for multimedia resources. All government-funded schools from nursery to secondary are eligible for eLearning Credits. The 2007–08 allocation was £1,000 for each maintained school and academy that directly provides nursery, primary or secondary education up to Key Stage 4 plus £3.42 for each pupil aged between 3 and 15. This was the final allocation of eLCs – ring-fenced funding via eLCs ceased at the end of August 2008.

ELC funding was not available for the purchase of hardware items such as computers, projectors and interactive whiteboards. The funding was targeted to support the purchase of digital learning materials. There was a small allowance in the scheme that permits the inclusion of a small ineligible item such as a printed manual or small hardware item necessary for the effective delivery of the product in the classroom.

The only Microsoft product eligible under the scheme is Encarta.

Elearning Credits have been rolled into the Harnessing Technology Grant which is being distributed to schools via Local Authorities. This is a capital grant and initial guidance seemed to indicate that subscription resources like www.educationcity.com may be precluded from it. However, after working with industry BECTA issued spending guidance that permitted the use of the fund for subscription resources.
