= South Gate High School =

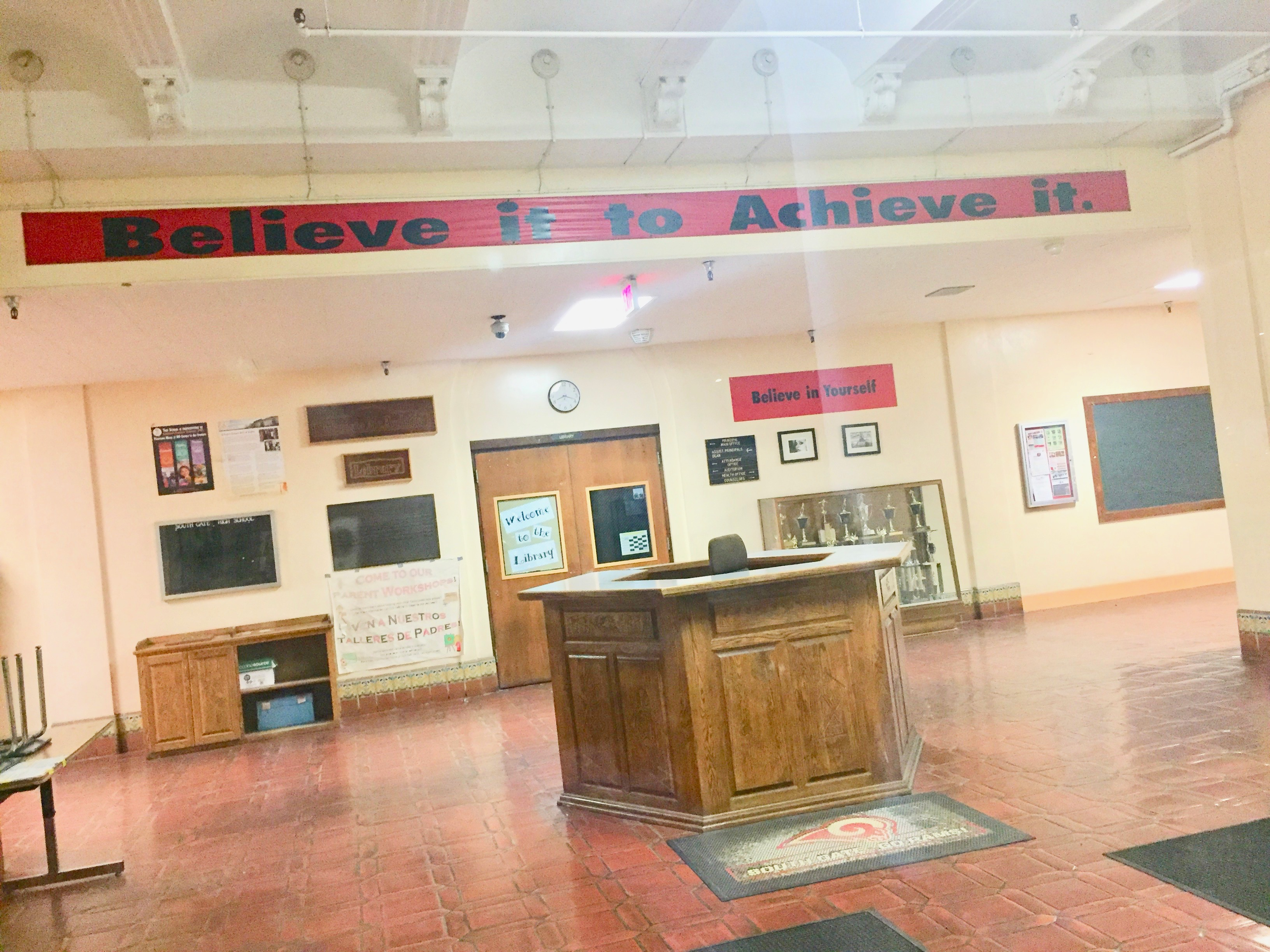

Location
- 3351 Firestone Boulevard; South Gate, California 90280; United States; 33.9553°N 118.20987°W

Information
- Type: Public high school
- Established: 1930; 96 years ago
- School district: Los Angeles Unified School District
- Principal: Leo González
- Teaching staff: 88.28 (on an FTE basis)
- Grades: 9–12
- Enrollment: 1,831 (2022–23)
- Student to teacher ratio: 20.74
- Colors: Black and red
- Athletics conference: Eastern League; CIF Los Angeles City Section
- Mascot: Ram
- Team name: Rams
- Rival: South East High School
- Website: southgatehs.lausd.org

South Gate High School is a 9–12 high school in South Gate, California, United States and is part of the Los Angeles Unified School District.

== History ==
South Gate High School opened in January 1930.

It was in the Los Angeles City High School District until 1961, when it merged into LAUSD.

Between 1993 and 1996 the number of students that passed Advanced Placement tests in government and macroeconomics subjects increased from 5% to 70%. The teaching of Ron Klein has been credited for this improvement.

Students from this and neighboring schools demonstrated on June 26, 2002 against funding cuts. At South Gate High, nine teachers had been fired and the Second School Program, which provided students who are falling behind with tutoring from university students, had all funding removed.

With the support of the school, about 800 students demonstrated against the counterfeiting of CDs of Latino music on December 5, 2002.

On November 3, 2005, about 500 students took part in a sit-in to protest at issues including overcrowding and a lack of textbooks.

== Demographics ==
As of the school year 2008–09, there were a total of 3,383 students attending the high school.

- 98.8% Hispanic (3,343)
- 0.4% White (14)
- 0.3% Black (15)
- 0.3% Native American (9)
- 0.2% Asian (4)
- 0.1% Pacific Islander (3)

== Sports ==
- Football
- Soccer
- Tennis
- Volleyball
- Basketball
- Baseball
- Marching Band
- Cross Country
- Track and Field
- Softball
- Cheerleading
- Color Guard
- Golf

=== Achievements ===
- Football – 1955 City Champions, 1988 3A City Champions, 2004 3A City Finalists, 2013 Division II Finalists, 2024 Division II Finalists, 2025 Division I Champions, 2025 5A Regional Finalists
- Football – Benjamin Viramontes – State Sack Leader with 34 in 2004
- Football – 1994 undefeated South East conference champions. Beat rival bell to preserve undefeated record. Ronnie Landazuri breaks up pass in final moments:
- Boys Soccer – 2005 City Champions, 2002 3rd Place
- Girls Soccer – 2016 Division III City Champions
- Baseball – 1955 City Champions, 1960 City Champions, 1993 3A City Champions, 1995 3A City Champions, 1996 3A City Champions, 1956 City Finalist, 1998 3A City Finalists, 2012 Division II City Finalists, 2019 Division II City Finalists, 2023 Division III Champions
- Softball – 1985 3A City Champions, 1986 3A City Champions, 1987 3A City Champions, 1989 3A City Champions, 1991 3A City Champions, 1997 3A City Champions
- Boys Basketball – 1992 3A City Finalists
- Girls Basketball – 2016 Division III City Champions
- Volleyball – 2011 Girls Undefeated Eastern League Champions
- Track & Field- 2008 Undefeated Eastern League Champions
- Cross Country- 2007 Undefeated Eastern League Champions
- Volleyball – 2013 Girls Eastern League Champions
- Volleyball – 2014 Girls Undefeated Eastern League Champions

== Notable alumni ==
- Tom Araya, vocalist and bassist of the metal band Slayer
- Dave Lombardo, former drummer of the metal band Slayer
- Sam Johnson, American football player
- Brenda Benet, television and film actress
- Lorenzo Mata, Class of 2004; Player for the U-18 United States Men's Basketball National Team, won a scholarship to play for the UCLA Bruins men's basketball team.
- Sen Dog, Member of hip hop group Cypress Hill.
- Mellow Man Ace, Member of hip hop group Cypress Hill group named after a street in the city of South Gate.
- Rick Renteria, Major League Baseball player and manager
- Kundy Gutierrez, Class of 1998; 2015-2021 General Manager of the Mexico National Team Baseball
- Lou Kimzey, publisher and movie producer.
