= Huntington Park High School =

Public school in Los Angeles, California, US

Location
- 6020 Miles Avenue; Huntington Park, Los Angeles, California 90255; United States; 33.9866°N 118.2189°W

Information
- Type: Public
- Opened: December 2, 1909
- Locale: Suburban, Large
- School district: Los Angeles Unified School District
- NCES District ID: 0622710
- NCES School ID: 062271003098
- Principal: Carlos Garibaldi
- Teaching staff: 78.46 (on an FTE basis)
- Grades: 9-12
- Enrollment: 1,479 (2024–25)
  - Male: 755
  - Female: 724
- Student to teacher ratio: 18.85
- Colors: Orange & Gray
- Mascot: Spartan
- Rival: Bell High School
- Newspaper: Spartan Shield
- Website: Official Website

Huntington Park High School is a public high school in Huntington Park, California, part of the Los Angeles Unified School District.

== History ==
The First Grammar School was initially built in 1904. The election was held with 21 registered voters casting ballots. The district was established in 1905, and the first school opened in a 12' board shack, with 13 students of all ages. The families of the students chipped in to hire a young high school girl as teacher, at a monthly fee of $50.

Huntington Park Union High School District was organized in 1909. The cornerstone for the first high school building was laid on December 2, 1909, and the first commencement exercise was held there on June 17, 1910, with Miss Olive Petties being the single graduating student. In January 1932, Huntington Park Union High School District, as a political entity, passed out of existence. The Huntington Park Union High School now became a unit of the Los Angeles City school system, and its official name became Huntington Park High School.

The school itself went through two crises. The first building burned down on 11 October 1911. The second building was wrecked by the violent 1933 Long Beach earthquake.

It was in the Los Angeles City High School District until 1961, when it merged into LAUSD.

In 2005, South East High School in South Gate opened, relieving Huntington Park. When South East opened, it took over areas in the Huntington Park High boundary within the City of South Gate and Walnut Park; Huntington Park High School previously served all of Walnut Park.

Huntington Park offers a full range of athletic teams. These teams compete against other schools in the district and in the surrounding area. Playing on a team can increase school spirit, build self-confidence, and improve fitness. In 1986 and 1990, Huntington Park High men's gymnastics were CIF all city champions. Of note, the Los Angeles all city gymnastics trophy is retired at Huntington Park High School, since 1990 was the last year city championships were held between Los Angeles county public schools. Tryouts for the teams usually take place the previous semester. For more information on tryouts contact the coach. In order to participate in extra curricular competitions, including both athletic and club competitions, a student must maintain a 2.0 GPA. Eligibility is determined every 10 weeks and is based on the 10- and 20-week report cards.

Fall Sports

Cross Country

Football

Girls Tennis

Girls Volleyball

Winter Sports

Boys Basketball

Girls Basketball

Boys Soccer

Girls Soccer

Spring Sports

Baseball

Boys Lacrosse

Girls Lacrosse

Softball

Track and Field

Boys Tennis

Boys Volleyball

== Demographics ==
The school serves areas in several municipalities, including most of Huntington Park, most of the Walnut Park census-designated place, and portions of Vernon. Some sections of Huntington Park and Maywood are jointly zoned to Huntington Park and Bell High School in Bell.

As of the school year 2008–09, there were a total of 4,312 students attending the high school.

Students by Ethnicity:

Hispanic 98%

Multiple or No Response < 1%

Black < 1%

Asian < 1%

White < 1%

Filipino < 1%

American Indian/Alaskan Native < 1%

Students by Gender:

Male 52%

Female 48%

== Notable faculty ==
- Leon Leyson, believed to be the youngest member of the Schindlerjuden, the group of Jews saved by Oskar Schindler during the Holocaust. Taught tech ed at the high school until his retirement in 1997.

== Notable alumni ==
- Jimmy Murphy (born 1894) – noted race car driver and riding mechanic.
- Tex Winter (born 1922) – member of Basketball Hall of Fame, nine NBA Championships in his tenure as an NBA assistant coach with the Chicago Bulls and Los Angeles Lakers, basketball innovator who taught the triangle offense to basketball player Michael Jordan.
- Nancy Hadley (class of 1948) - American retired model and actress, who performed on stage and in television and films.
- Tippi Hedren (class of 1950) – American actress, animal rights activist and former fashion model.
- Craig Fertig (class of 1960) – Quarterback at University of Southern California (USC), where he set 8 passing records, head coach at University of Oregon, talent scout for USC, television broadcaster for USC football, uncle of another USC quarterback, Todd Marinovich.
