= Area code 928 =

Area code in Arizona, United States

Coordinates: 35°N 112°W

Clickable map of Arizona area codes in blue (and border states) with area code 928 shown in red

Area code 928 is a telephone area code in the North American Numbering Plan for the U.S. state of Arizona. The numbering plan area comprises the northern, eastern, and western portions of the state. It includes Beaver Dam, the Grand Canyon, Flagstaff, Holbrook, Lake Havasu City, Littlefield, Kingman, Prescott, San Luis, Sedona, Wickenburg, Winslow and Yuma, and also serves most of Greenlee County, some areas on the western and northern fringes of the Phoenix metropolitan area, such as Lake Pleasant Regional Park in Peoria, and the Arizona portion of the Navajo Nation.

The numbering plan area was created in a split of area code 520 on June 23, 2001, due mainly to population gains in Tucson, Yuma, and Flagstaff.

Prior to October 2021, area code 928 had telephone numbers assigned for the central office code 988. In 2020, 988 was designated nationwide as a dialing code for the National Suicide Prevention Lifeline, which created a conflict for exchanges that permit seven-digit dialing. This area code was therefore scheduled to transition to ten-digit dialing by October 24, 2021.

== See also ==
- List of North American Numbering Plan area codes
- List of Arizona area codes

Arizona area codes: 520, 602/480/623, 928
	North: 435, 970	
West: 442/760, 702/725, 775	928	East: 505, 575, 970
	South: 480/602/623, 520, country code 52 (Mexico)	
California area codes: 209/350, 213/323, 310/424, 408/669, 415/628, 510/341, 530, 559, 562, 619/858, 626, 650, 661, 707/369, 714/657, 760/442, 805/820, 818/747, 831, 909/840, 916/279, 925, 949, 951
Colorado area codes: 303/720/983, 719, 748/970
Nevada area codes: 702/725, 775
New Mexico area codes: 505, 575
Utah area codes: 385/801, 435
