= Area code 775 =

Area code for Nevada, United States

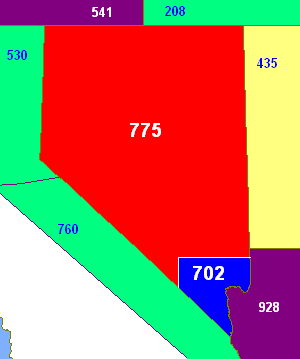
The red numbering plan area has area code 775; the blue area has area code 702/725, also in Nevada. All other area codes are in other states.

Area code 775 is a telephone area code in the North American Numbering Plan (NANP) for the northern part of the U.S. state of Nevada. The numbering plan area (NPA) was split from area code 702 on December 12, 1998, which had served all of Nevada since 1947. Clark County retained area code 702 after the split. Major cities in the numbering plan area include Reno, Carson City, Elko, and Pahrump. More than 80 percent of its numbers are located in the far western portion around Reno and Carson City.

== History ==
Prior to the creation of 775, area code 702 had served all of Nevada for 51 years. The state's growth in the second half of the 20th century and the corresponding growth in telephone service, particularly from the proliferation of cell phones, pagers, and fax machines in Las Vegas, Reno, and Carson City, threatened exhaustion of numbering resources.

Area code 775 is nowhere near exhaustion. Under the most recent projections, northern Nevada will not need another area code until late 2045.

Prior to October 2021, area code 775 had telephone numbers assigned for the central office code 988. In 2020, 988 was designated nationwide as a dialing code for the National Suicide Prevention Lifeline, which created a conflict for exchanges that permit seven-digit dialing. This area code was therefore scheduled to transition to ten-digit dialing by October 24, 2021.

== See also ==
- List of North American Numbering Plan area codes
- List of Nevada area codes

Nevada area codes: 702/725, 775
	North: 208/986, 541/458	
West: 530, 442/760	area code 775	East: 435, 928
	South: 702/725, 442/760	
Arizona area codes: 520, 602/480/623, 928
California area codes: 209/350, 213/323, 310/424, 408/669, 415/628, 510/341, 530, 559, 562, 619/858, 626, 650, 661, 707/369, 714/657, 760/442, 805/820, 818/747, 831, 909/840, 916/279, 925, 949, 951
Idaho area codes: 208/986
Oregon area codes: 503/971, 541/458
Utah area codes: 385/801, 435
