= Area code 808 =

Telephone area code for Hawaii

Area code 808 is a telephone area code in the North American Numbering Plan (NANP) for the Hawaiian Islands, comprising the Windward and the Leeward islands. The area code also serves Wake Island in the western Pacific Ocean. The code was assigned on August 8, 1957, about two years before the statehood of Hawaii.

Slightly over 1.4 million people live in Hawaii. Despite the state's rapid growth, and the proliferation of mobile numbers (particularly in Oahu, which includes Honolulu), a single area code is projected to be enough to serve the state until at least the third quarter of 2035.

Prior to October 2021, area code 808 had telephone numbers assigned for the central office code 988. In 2020, 988 was designated as a nationwide three-digit dialing code for the National Suicide Prevention Lifeline. This created a conflict for Hawaii's exchanges, all of which permitted seven-digit dialing. Therefore, area code 808 transitioned to ten-digit dialing on October 24, 2021.

Marcus Mariota, quarterback for the Washington Commanders football team and 2014 Heisman Trophy winner, had a special face mask honoring the 808 area code while playing with the University of Oregon.

== See also ==
- Ate-Oh-Ate, restaurant in Portland, Oregon, named after the area code
- List of North American Numbering Plan area codes

Hawaii area codes: 808
	North: 907, Pacific Ocean	
West: 670, 671, Pacific Ocean	808	East: Pacific Ocean, 310/424, 415/628, 619/858, 650, 714/657, 805/820, 831, 949
	South: 684, Pacific Ocean	
Alaska area codes: 907
California area codes: 209/350, 213/323, 310/424, 408/669, 415/628, 510/341, 530, 559, 562, 619/858, 626, 650, 661, 707/369, 714/657, 760/442, 805/820, 818/747, 831, 909/840, 916/279, 925, 949, 951
Guam area codes: 671
Northern Mariana Islands area codes: 670
American Samoa area codes: 684
