= List of area code overlays =

An area code overlay is a numbering plan area (NPA) in the North American Numbering Plan (NANP) that has multiple area codes assigned. Overlay complexes are used to add central office prefixes in an NPA to increase the number of available telephone numbers.

Overlay area codes		Location	Notes
Added	Base	Location	Notes
557	314	St. Louis, Missouri (communities such as, but not limited to, St. Louis, Overland, Bridgeton, Florissant, Webster Groves, Creve Coeur, Kirkwood and Sappington)	Initial overlay area code plan was announced October 24, 2000. New 557 area code was announced in February 2022 and went into effect August 12, 2022.
324	904	Jacksonville, Jacksonville Beach, Fernandina Beach, Orange Park and surrounding communities	
220	740	Central and southeastern Ohio	
223	717	South Central Pennsylvania	
224	847	Northern suburbs of Chicago, Illinois	
226, 382, 548	519	Southwestern Ontario	
234	330	Akron-Canton and Warren-Youngstown areas in Ohio	
236, 672, 778	604, 250	British Columbia	
227, 240	301	Washington, D.C. suburbs and panhandle of Maryland	
249	705	Northeastern and central Ontario	
267, 445	215	Philadelphia, Pennsylvania area and a small portion of its Pennsylvania suburbs	
272	570	Northeastern Pennsylvania, including the cities of Scranton, Wilkes-Barre, and Williamsport	
279	916	Sacramento, California and surrounding suburbs	
281, 346, 621, 832	713	Greater Houston, Texas	
289, 365	905	Golden Horseshoe region of Ontario, including suburban Toronto, Hamilton, Oshawa, and the Niagara Peninsula in Ontario	
321	407	Central Florida	In addition to being the sole area code in the Space Coast region around the Kennedy Space Center, this is the only partial overlay area code in North America
323	213	Central Los Angeles, incl. Downtown L.A. and Hollywood	
326	937	Southwest Ohio	
331	630	Western suburbs of Chicago	
332, 646 , 917	212	New York City borough of Manhattan, except for the Marble Hill neighborhood, which is physically connected to The Bronx and uses 718	
339	781	Suburban Boston, Massachusetts and most of the South Shore region	
341	510	San Francisco East Bay	
343	613	Ottawa and eastern Ontario	
347, 929	718	New York City boroughs of The Bronx, Brooklyn, Queens, and Staten Island, as well as Marble Hill, a Manhattan neighborhood directly connected to The Bronx	
351	978	North-central and most of northeastern Massachusetts	
364	270	Western half of Kentucky, including the Purchase area, the Western Coal Fields, and most of the Pennyrile	
367, 581	418	Eastern Quebec	
368, 587, 825	780, 403	Alberta	
380	614	Columbus, Ohio, and suburbs	
385	801	Along the Wasatch Front of Utah, including Salt Lake City, Provo–Orem, and Ogden	
424	310	Southwestern Los Angeles County, California	
430	903	Northeastern Texas	
431	204	Manitoba	
437, 647	416	Toronto, Ontario	
438	514	Island of Montreal, Quebec	
442	760	Southeastern California	
443, 667	410	Baltimore metropolitan area and the Eastern Shore of Maryland	
447	217	Central Illinois	
448	850	Florida Panhandle, including Tallahassee and Pensacola	
458	541	Most of Oregon, excluding its northwestern part	
464	708	Near western suburbs and southern suburbs of Chicago	
469, 972	214	Eastern portion of the Dallas–Fort Worth metroplex in and around Dallas, Texas	
470, 678	404, 770	Atlanta metropolitan area, Georgia	
474	306	Saskatchewan	
475	203	Southwestern Connecticut	
480, 623	602	Arizona (Phoenix metropolitan area; primarily the city of Phoenix)	Originally split into separate area codes in 1999, then recombined in 2023 into an overlay complex for the Phoenix metropolitan area
484	610	Eastern and parts of southeastern Pennsylvania	
531	402	Eastern Nebraska	
534	715	Northern Wisconsin	
539	918	Northeastern Oklahoma	
551	201	Northeastern New Jersey	
564	360	Western Washington	564 initially overlays only 360, but will expand to overlay 206, 253, and 425 as those area codes run out of numbers
567	419	Northwestern Ohio, including Toledo and Lima	
571	703	Northern Virginia	
572	405	Central Oklahoma, including greater Oklahoma City	
582	814	Central and western Pennsylvania, including Altoona, DuBois, and Erie	
587	403, 780	Alberta	
628	415	San Francisco, Marin County and small portions of San Mateo County	
629	615	Nashville, Tennessee	
639	306	Saskatchewan	
640	609	Central and southeast New Jersey	
657	714	Northern Orange County, California	
658	876	Jamaica	
659	205	Western and central Alabama	
669	408	Southern Bay Area in California, encompassing much of Santa Clara County and Silicon Valley	
672	604, 250	British Columbia	
680	315	An area of Upstate New York including parts of Central New York and the North Country, with Syracuse as the main city in the region	
681	304	West Virginia	
682	817	Western part of the Dallas–Fort Worth metroplex, in and around Fort Worth, Texas	
689	407	Orlando, Florida	
720, 983	303	Denver metropolitan area, Colorado	
725	702	Clark County, Nevada	
726	210	San Antonio, Texas	
737	512	Austin, Texas	
743	336	Piedmont Triad, North Carolina including Greensboro, Winston-Salem, and western areas of the Raleigh-Durham metropolitan area.	
747	818	San Fernando Valley, California	
754	954	Broward County, Florida	
769	601	Central Mississippi	
771	202	Washington, D.C.	
774	508	South-central and most of southeastern Massachusetts, including Cape Cod and the Islands	
779	815	Northern and north-central Illinois, including the Rockford, Freeport, and Kankakee areas	
782	902	Nova Scotia and Prince Edward Island on 30 November 2014	
786, 645	305	Miami-Dade County, Florida and the Florida Keys	
801	385	Salt Lake City	
820	805	Ventura, Santa Barbara and San Luis Obispo Counties in California	
825	403, 780	Alberta	
829, 849	809	Dominican Republic	
839	803	Central South Carolina	
840	909	Pomona Valley and western San Bernardino County, CA	
848	732	Central New Jersey	
857	617	Boston, Cambridge and Quincy, Massachusetts	
858	619	San Diego, CA and surrounding area	
862	973	Northern New Jersey	
872	312, 773	Chicago, Illinois	
873	819	Gatineau and western Quebec	
878	412, 724	Metro Pittsburgh, Pennsylvania	
917	212, 332, 347, 646, 718, 929	The entirety of New York City (The Bronx, Brooklyn, Manhattan, Queens, and Staten Island)	Originally primarily for cellular phones and pagers
930	812	Southern Indiana	
934	631	Suffolk County, New York	
938	256	Northern Alabama	
939	787	Puerto Rico	
469, 972, 945	214	Eastern greater Dallas-Fort Worth, TX	
947	248	Oakland County, Michigan	
959	860	Northern and western Connecticut	
971	503	Northwestern Oregon, including the Portland, Salem, and Astoria metropolitan areas	
980	704	Charlotte metropolitan area, North Carolina	
984	919	Raleigh-Durham, North Carolina metropolitan area	
986	208	Idaho	
624	716	New York (Buffalo, Niagara Falls, Olean, and parts of Western New York)	

== See also ==
- List of North American Numbering Plan area codes
- List of future North American area codes
- Original North American area codes
- Telephone numbers in the Americas
