= Terra Lago =

Gated community in Riverside County, California

- Gated community
- Location within California
- Coordinates: 33°44′26″N 116°11′10″W
- Country: United States
- State: California
- County: Riverside County
- City: Indio
- ZIP Code: 92203
- Area codes: 760 and 442

Terra Lago, Indio is a gated community located in Riverside County, California, of the Coachella Valley, approximately 25 miles (40 km) east of Palm Springs. Its address is 42-900 Lago Vista, 92203 Indio, California. The community is inside area codes 442 and 760. As of 2014, it was managed by Desert Resort Management, a company owned by Associa.

The community consists of approximately 520 homes built in the villa style by five architects and developers under a unified master plan. The community surrounds a 20-acre (81,000 m^{2}) lake, used for canoeing, sailing and fishing.

The Golf Club at Terra Lago features two 18-hole championship courses, known as The North & South Courses. This is another separate community.

The community has a recreation center, a fitness center, an outdoor Olympic style swimming pool and hot tub, and a 100-seater ballroom which hosts parties and entertainment.
