= Area codes 530 and 837 =

Area code in northern California

Coordinates: 41°N 121°W

Numbering plan areas in California (blue) and border states. Area code 530 is shown in red.

Area codes 530 and 837 are telephone area codes in the North American Numbering Plan (NANP) in northeastern and Northern California. 530 was created in 1997 in an area code split of 916 and 837 was added to the same numbering plan area as an overlay in 2025.

The numbering plan area (NPA) includes the Sacramento Valley, including some outer suburbs of Sacramento, Shasta Cascade, and the northern Sierra Nevada. It comprises all or sections of the following counties: Alpine, Butte, Colusa, El Dorado, Glenn, Humboldt, Lassen, Modoc, Mono, Nevada, Placer, Plumas, Shasta, Sierra, Siskiyou, Sutter, Tehama, Trinity, Yolo, and Yuba.

== History ==
Area code 530 was created in a split of numbering plan area 916 on November 1, 1997. Simultaneously, the Dixon exchange was reassigned from area code 916 to area code 707, and from the Sacramento Local access and transport area (LATA) to the San Francisco LATA.

Prior to October 2021, area code 530 had telephone numbers assigned for the central office code 988. In 2020, 988 was designated nationwide as a dialing code for the National Suicide Prevention Lifeline, which created a conflict for exchanges that permit seven-digit dialing. This area code was therefore scheduled to transition to ten-digit dialing by October 24, 2021.

On June 8, 2023, the California Public Utilities Commission assigned area code 837 to overlay 530, effectively in service on January 31, 2025. 837 is California's 40th area code. As ten-digit dialing is already in effect, no permissive dialing period will be necessary.

== Service area ==
Major cities in the numbering plan area include Auburn, Chico, Colfax, Davis, Grass Valley, Corning, Marysville, Oroville, Paradise, Placerville, Redding, Red Bluff, Susanville, Truckee, Woodland, Yuba City, and South Lake Tahoe.

=== Alpine County ===
- Alpine Village
- Bear Valley
- Markleeville
- Mesa Vista
- Woodfords

=== Butte County ===
- Bangor
- Berry Creek
- Biggs
- Brush Creek
- Butte Meadows
- Centerville
- Cherokee
- Chico
- Cohasset
- Concow
- Dayton
- DeSabla
- Durham
- East Biggs
- Feather Falls
- Forbestown
- Forest Ranch
- Gridley
- Inskip
- Magalia
- Merrimac
- Nord
- Oregon City
- Oroville East
- Oroville
- Palermo
- Paradise
- Pulga
- Richvale
- South Oroville
- Stirling City
- Thermalito
- Yankee Hill

=== Colusa County ===
- Arbuckle
- College City
- Colusa
- Grimes
- Maxwell
- Princeton
- Sites
- Stonyford
- Williams

=== El Dorado County ===
- Cameron Park
- Camino
- Coloma
- Cool
- Diamond Springs
- Ditch Camp Five
- Echo Lake
- El Dorado
- Fresh Pond
- Garden Valley
- Georgetown
- Kyburz
- Little Norway
- Meyers
- Nebelhorn
- Newtown
- Pacific
- Phillips
- Placerville
- Pollock Pines
- Rescue
- Riverton
- Sciots Camp
- Shingle Springs
- South Lake Tahoe
- Twin Bridges
- White Hall

=== Glenn County ===
- Artois
- Glenn
- Hamilton City
- Ordbend
- Butte City
- Orland
- Willows

=== Humboldt County ===
- Willow Creek
- Hoopa

=== Lassen County ===
- Bieber
- Doyle
- Herlong
- Janesville
- Ravendale
- Susanville
- Termo
- Westwood

=== Modoc County ===
- Adin
- Alturas
- Canby
- Cedarville
- Davis Creek
- Eagleville
- Fort Bidwell
- Newell
- Stronghold
- Tionesta

=== Nevada County ===
- Alta Sierra
- Grass Valley
- Lake of the Pines
- Lake Wildwood
- Nevada City
- Penn Valley
- Rough and Ready
- Truckee
- Washington

=== Placer County ===
- Alta
- Applegate
- Auburn
- Carnelian Bay
- Colfax
- Dollar Point
- Dutch Flat
- Emigrant Gap
- Foresthill
- Gold Run, California
- Homewood
- Kings Beach
- Meadow Vista
- Olympic Valley
- Sheridan
- Sunnyside-Tahoe City
- Tahoe Vista
- Weimar

=== Plumas County ===
- Almanor
- Beckwourth
- Belden
- Blairsden
- Bucks Lake
- C-Road
- Canyondam
- Caribou
- Chester
- Chilcoot-Vinton
- Clio
- Crescent Mills
- Cromberg
- Delleker
- East Quincy
- East Shore
- Graeagle
- Greenhorn
- Greenville
- Hamilton Branch
- Indian Falls
- Iron Horse
- Johnsville
- Keddie
- La Porte
- Lake Almanor Country Club
- Lake Almanor Peninsula
- Lake Almanor West
- Lake Davis
- Little Grass Valley
- Meadow Valley
- Mohawk Vista
- Paxton
- Plumas Eureka
- Portola
- Prattville
- Quincy
- Spring Garden
- Storrie
- Taylorsville
- Tobin
- Twain
- Valley Ranch
- Whitehawk

=== Shasta County ===
- Anderson
- Bella Vista
- Big Bend
- Burney
- Cassel
- Castella
- Cottonwood
- Fall River Mills
- French Gulch
- Hat Creek
- Igo
- Lakehead-Lakeshore
- McArthur
- Millville
- Montgomery Creek
- Oak Run
- Old Station
- Palo Cedro
- Platina
- Pollard Flat
- Redding
- Round Mountain
- Shasta Lake City
- Shasta
- Shingletown
- Whiskeytown
- Whitmore

=== Sierra County ===
- Alleghany
- Calpine
- Downieville
- Loyalton
- Sierra City

=== Siskiyou County ===
- Carrick
- Dorris
- Dunsmuir
- Edgewood
- Etna
- Forks of Salmon
- Fort Jones
- Gazelle
- Greenview
- Grenada
- Happy Camp
- Hornbrook
- Macdoel
- McCloud
- Montague
- Mount Hebron
- Mount Shasta
- Seiad Valley
- Tennant
- Tulelake
- Weed
- Yreka

=== Sutter County ===
- Live Oak
- Meridian
- Nicolaus
- Rio Oso
- Robbins
- South Yuba City
- Sutter
- Tierra Buena
- Yuba City

=== Tehama County ===
- Corning
- Cottonwood
- Dales
- Gerber-Las Flores
- Los Molinos
- Manton
- Mill Creek
- Mineral
- Paskenta
- Paynes Creek
- Rancho Tehama
- Red Bluff
- Tehama

=== Trinity County ===
- Big Bar
- Burnt Ranch
- Douglas City
- Hayfork
- Hyampom
- Junction City
- Lewiston
- Mad River
- Salyer
- Trinity Center
- Weaverville

=== Yolo County ===
- Brooks
- Capay
- Davis
- Dunnigan
- El Macero
- Esparto
- Fremont
- Knights Landing
- Madison
- Plainfield
- Rumsey
- Winters
- Woodland
- Yolo
- Zamora

=== Yuba County ===
- Beale Air Force Base
- Challenge-Brownsville
- Linda
- Loma Rica
- Marysville
- Olivehurst
- Plumas Lake
- Wheatland

== See also ==
- List of California area codes
- List of North American Numbering Plan area codes

California area codes: 209/350, 213/323, 310/424, 408/669, 415/628, 510/341, 530, 559, 562, 619/858, 626, 650, 661, 707/369, 714/657, 760/442, 805/820, 818/747, 831, 909/840, 916/279, 925, 949, 951
	North: 541/458	
West: 707/369	530/837	East: 775
	South: 209/350, 760/442, 916/279	
Nevada area codes: 702/725, 775
Oregon area codes: 503/971, 541/458
