= Area code 831 =

Area code for Monterey, Salinas and Santa Cruz, California

Coordinates: 36.9°N 121.8°W

Numbering plan areas in California (blue) and border states. Area code 831 is shown in red.

Area code 831 is a telephone area code in the North American Numbering Plan for a small region of the U.S. state of California. The numbering plan area (NPA) comprises Monterey County, San Benito County, and Santa Cruz County. The area code was created in 1998 in an area code split of area code 408.

== History ==
In 1947, the American Telephone and Telegraph Company (AT&T) devised the first nationwide telephone numbering plan and assigned the original North American area codes. The state of California was divided into three numbering plan areas (NPAs) with distinct area codes: 213, 415, and 916, for the southern, central, and northern parts of the state, respectively. California area codes were reorganized geographically in 1950, so that 916 was assigned to a numbering plan area that comprised only the northeastern part from the Sierra Nevada to the Central Valley. The coastal area to the west was assigned area code 415.

Area code 408 was split from numbering plan area 415 on March 1, 1959. The new numbering plan area included most of Santa Clara, Santa Cruz, Monterey and San Benito Counties.

In 1997, the California/Nevada Code Administrator (C/NCA) advised the North American Numbering Plan Administration (NANPA) of the need for area code relief in the 408 numbering plan area. A geographic area code split had been approved by the California Public Utilities Commission (CPUC) which would install area code 831 for a new numbering plan area comprising the communities of Santa Cruz, Salinas, Monterey, and Hollister. Area code 408 would be retained in Sunnyvale, San Jose, Los Gatos, and Gilroy. The area code split became effective on July 11, 1998, with a permissive dialing period ending on February 20, 1999.

Due to the relatively small size of the area (in both area and population), exhaustion of 831 is unlikely for the foreseeable future.

== Service area ==
The service area of NPA 831 includes Big Sur, Monterey Bay, the Salinas Valley, and the southwestern Santa Cruz Mountains.

Major cities in the area are Salinas, Hollister, Monterey, Santa Cruz and places in the northern Central Coast.

=== Monterey County ===
- Aromas
- Big Sur
- Boronda
- Carmel Highlands
- Carmel Valley Village
- Carmel-by-the-Sea
- Castroville
- Chualar
- Del Monte Forest
- Del Rey Oaks
- Elkhorn
- Gonzales
- Gorda
- Greenfield
- Jolon
- King City
- Las Lomas
- Lockwood
- Marina
- Monterey
- Moss Landing
- Pacific Grove
- Pajaro
- Pebble Beach
- Prunedale
- Salinas
- San Ardo
- San Lucas
- Sand City
- Seaside
- Soledad
- Spreckels

=== San Benito County ===
- Aromas
- Hollister
- New Idria
- Paicines
- Panoche
- Ridgemark
- San Juan Bautista
- Tres Pinos

=== Santa Cruz County ===
- Amesti
- Aptos Hills-Larkin Valley
- Aptos
- Ben Lomond
- Bonny Doon
- Boulder Creek
- Brookdale
- Capitola
- Corralitos
- Davenport
- Day Valley
- Felton
- Freedom
- Interlaken
- Live Oak
- Lompico
- Mount Hermon
- Opal Cliffs
- Pasatiempo
- Rio del Mar
- Santa Cruz
- Scotts Valley
- Soquel
- Summit
- Swanton
- Twin Lakes
- Watsonville

== See also ==
- List of California area codes
- List of North American Numbering Plan area codes

California area codes: 209/350, 213/323, 310/424, 408/669, 415/628, 510/341, 530, 559, 562, 619/858, 626, 650, 661, 707/369, 714/657, 760/442, 805/820, 818/747, 831, 909/840, 916/279, 925, 949, 951
	North: 408/669, 650	
West: Pacific Ocean, 808	831	East: 209/350, 559
	South: 805/820	
Hawaii area codes: 808
