= Area codes 559 and 357 =

Telephone area codes in California

Coordinates: 37°N 120°W

Numbering plan areas in California (blue) and border states. Area code 559 is shown in red.

Area codes 559 and 357 are telephone area codes in the North American Numbering Plan for the central San Joaquin Valley in central California. The numbering plan area includes the counties of Fresno, Madera, Kings, and Tulare, an area largely coextensive with the Fresno and Visalia-Porterville metropolitan areas. Area code 559 was placed in service in 1998, when its services area was split from that of area code 209. 357 was added to form an overlay complex in 2025.

== History ==
In 1997, the California-Nevada Code Administration (CNCA) determined that telephone number demand in the area exceeded normal forecasts, and placed area codes 209, 213, 310, 408, 619, 805, and 818 in jeopardy status of exhausting central office codes before normal relief could be implemented, triggering special conservation measures.

As a result, area code 559 was created in an area code split of the 209 numbering plan area on November 14, 1998. The new area code was assigned to the southern part of 209. A permissive dialing period was maintained until May 15, 1999. Although this provided general relief, the California-Nevada Code Administration (CNCA) indicated that area code 209 remained in jeopardy status for further relief actions.

Like many other regions that had experienced area code changes and additions during the first boom of wireless devices, such as cellular telephones and pagers in the 1990s, both 559 and 209 were in the early planning stages of relief, potentially creating the need for introduction of further new area codes. Yet by 2002, telephone number pooling was enforced for the 209 and 559 central offices, reducing the size of telephone number blocks allocated to carriers from 10,000 to 1,000 numbers.

Area code 559 was expected to exhaust in 2025. For relief, the California Public Utilities Commission approved an all-service overlay complex with new area code 357 for an in-service date of March 26, 2025. This required the implementation of ten-digit dialing in the central San Joaquin Valley.

== Service area ==
The area codes serve the Central California counties of Fresno, Madera, Kings, and Tulare.

The major cities within the service region are Fresno, Coalinga, Clovis, Madera, Sanger, Reedley, Dinuba, Selma, Tulare, Visalia, Hanford, Lemoore, Porterville, Avenal, and Kingsburg.

=== Fresno County ===
- Auberry
- Big Creek
- Biola
- Bowles
- Calwa
- Cantua Creek
- Caruthers
- Clovis
- Coalinga
- Del Rey
- Dunlap
- Easton
- Firebaugh
- Fowler
- Fresno
- Friant
- Huron
- Kerman
- Kingsburg
- Knowles
- Lanare
- Laton
- Mendota
- Mercey Hot Springs
- Orange Cove
- Parlier
- Pinedale
- Prather
- Raisin City
- Reedley
- Riverdale
- Rolinda
- San Joaquin
- Sanger
- Selma
- Shaver Lake
- Squaw Valley
- Tollhouse
- Tranquillity

=== Kings County ===
- Armona
- Avenal
- Corcoran
- Hanford
- Hardwick
- Home Garden
- Kettleman City
- Lemoore Station
- Lemoore
- Stratford

=== Madera County ===
- Ahwahnee
- Bonadelle Ranchos-Madera Ranchos
- Chowchilla
- Coarsegold
- Fish Camp
- Madera Acres
- Madera
- Millerton
- North Fork
- Oakhurst
- Parksdale
- Parkwood
- Raymond
- Yosemite Lakes

=== Tulare County ===
- Alpaugh
- Badger
- Cutler
- Dinuba
- Ducor
- East Orosi
- East Porterville
- Exeter
- Farmersville
- Goshen
- Ivanhoe
- Lemon Cove
- Lindsay
- London
- Orosi
- Pixley
- Poplar-Cotton Center
- Porterville
- Richgrove
- Springville
- Strathmore
- Terra Bella
- Three Rivers
- Tipton
- Traver
- Tulare
- Visalia
- Woodlake
- Woodville

== See also ==
- List of California area codes
- List of North American Numbering Plan area codes

California area codes: 209/350, 213/323, 310/424, 408/669, 415/628, 510/341, 530, 559, 562, 619/858, 626, 650, 661, 707/369, 714/657, 760/442, 805/820, 818/747, 831, 909/840, 916/279, 925, 949, 951
| | North: 209/350 | |
| West: 805/820, 831 | 559/357 | East: 760/442 |
| | South: 661 | |
