= Fresh Pond, California =

Unincorporated community in California, United States

Fresh Pond
- Unincorporated community
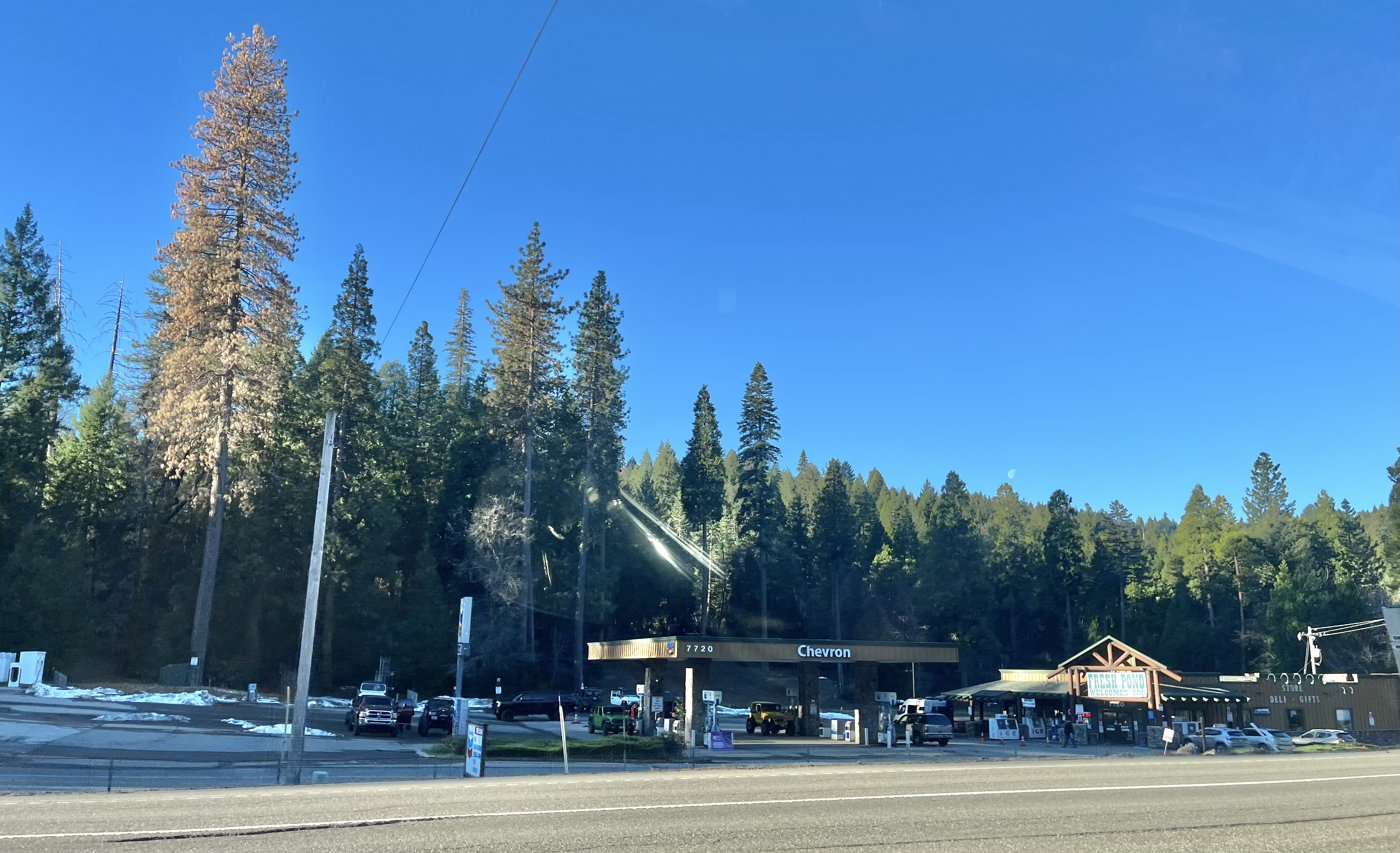

- Location in California
- Coordinates: 38°45′37″N 120°31′48″W
- Country: United States
- State: California
- County: El Dorado
- Area Code: 530, 837
- Zip Code: 95726
- Elevation: 3,606 ft (1,099 m)

Fresh Pond is a small unincorporated community in El Dorado County, California, United States. It is located 3 miles (4.8 km) east of Pollock Pines, at an elevation of 3606 feet (1099 m). The ZIP code is 95726. The community is inside area code 530.

Fresh Pond was a lumbering community in the 1800s, with a sawmill and a stop on the Pony Express route. The Fresh Pond Cafeteria, at the site of the old town, burned down in the 1970s, but its iconic wooden sign was preserved by later businesses. The site is now the Fresh Pond Trading Post, a gas station and store.

Since Fresh Pond is high enough in elevation to receive snow in the winter, so is a popular site for sledding and other snow activities.
