= Sunfair, California =

Unincorporated community in California, United States

Sunfair
- Unincorporated community
- Location within the state of California Sunfair (the United States)
- Coordinates: 34°9′50″N 116°14′50″W
- Country: United States
- State: California
- County: San Bernardino
- Elevation: 2,412 ft (735 m)
- Time zone: UTC-8 (Pacific (PST))
  - Summer (DST): UTC-7 (PDT)
- ZIP codes: 92277
- Area code: 760
- GNIS feature ID: 250092

Sunfair is an unincorporated community in the Mojave Desert, within San Bernardino County, California.

The community is about 3.5 miles (5.6 km) northeast of Joshua Tree. State Route 62 traverses the area south of Sunfair in an east–west direction. Sunfair lies near the northern border of Joshua Tree National Park

The community is served by the Morongo Unified School District.

The Hi-Desert Medical Center is located here.

== Area landmarks ==
Other nearby geographic features include:

- Hi Desert Airport (FAA ID: L80) at 5500 Sunfair Road near the south extent of the community 34°09′15″N 116°15′07″W.
- Sunfair Heights, California — neighborhood to the north.
- Coyote Lake at 35°04′13″N 116°45′14″W.
- Panorama Heights, a community to the south, at 34°07′27″N 116°13′12″W.

== See also ==
- Populated places in the Mojave Desert
