= Manor, California =

Manor
- Former unincorporated community District of Fairfax
- Location in California
- Coordinates: 37°59′27″N 122°35′27″W
- Country: United States
- State: California
- County: Marin County
- Incorporated town: Fairfax
- Elevation: 157 ft (48 m)
- Area codes: 415/628

Manor is a former unincorporated community now incorporated in Fairfax in Marin County, California. It lies at an elevation of 157 feet (48 m). The community is in ZIP code 94930 and area codes 415 and 628.
