= List of Maryland area codes =

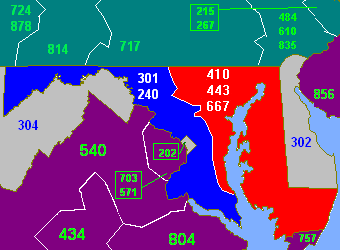
The blue area is assigned area codes 301, 240, and 227; the red area is the 410/443/667 overlay

The state of Maryland is served in two geographically distinct numbering plan areas in the North American Numbering Plan (NANP), which are each served with three overlay area codes.

Area code	Year created	Parent NPA	Overlay	Numbering plan area
301	1947	–	227/240/301	Western Maryland, including its suburbs of Washington, D.C.
240	1997	301	227/240/301	Western Maryland, including its suburbs of Washington, D.C.
227	2023	240/301	227/240/301	Western Maryland, including its suburbs of Washington, D.C.
410	1991	301	410/443/667	Eastern Maryland including Baltimore and Annapolis
443	1997	410	410/443/667	Eastern Maryland including Baltimore and Annapolis
667	2012	410/443	410/443/667	Eastern Maryland including Baltimore and Annapolis
