= Zenia, California =

Unincorporated community in California, United States

- Unincorporated community
- Location within California Location within the United States
- Coordinates: 40°12′20″N 123°29′31″W
- Country: United States
- State: California
- County: Trinity
- Elevation: 2,969 ft (905 m)
- Time zone: UTC-8 (Pacific (PST))
  - Summer (DST): UTC-7 (PDT)
- ZIP code: 95595
- Area code: 530
- GNIS feature ID: 252841

Zenia is an unincorporated community in Trinity County, California, United States. Zenia is 6.5 miles (10.5 km) northeast of Alderpoint. Zenia has a post office with ZIP code 95595, which opened in 1899. It is 3.8 miles from Kettenpom.

== History ==
Zenia was first named 'Poison Camp' by men who went there in the 1860s after larkspur in the area poisoned their cattle. Postmaster George Croyden named the community Zenia after a girl.

Zenia is home to the historic Seven Cedars homestead founded in 1902.

== See also ==
- Trinity County, California
