= Confidence, California =

Unincorporated community in California, United States

- Unincorporated community
- Location within California Location within the United States
- Coordinates: 38°02′51″N 120°12′01″W
- Country: United States
- State: California
- County: Tuolumne
- Elevation: 4,147 ft (1,264 m)
- Time zone: UTC-8 (Pacific (PST))
  - Summer (DST): UTC-7 (PDT)
- ZIP code: 95383
- Area code: 209
- GNIS feature ID: 1658309

Confidence is an unincorporated community on State Route 108 in Tuolumne County, California, United States, with a population of 50 people. The town sits at an average elevation of 4,200 feet (1,300 meters). The ZIP Code for the area is 95383, and the community is within area code 209.
