= Summit, Santa Cruz County, California =

Unincorporated community in California, United States

Coordinates: 37°07′56″N 121°58′46″W

Summit is a small unincorporated community more frequently referred to by locals as the Loma Prieta Community, located partially in Santa Clara County, but predominantly in Santa Cruz County, California, United States, in the ranges of the Santa Cruz Mountains. It lies at the summit along Highway 17 from which it derives its name. Home to a series of abandoned railroad towns and tunnels from the South Pacific Coast Railroad which operated until the 1940s, public transportation by bus is also no longer available from the Summit Road area. VTA bus route 76 has been cancelled since June 2010, and the Highway 17 Express only stops in Scotts Valley. It is one of the few places in the San Francisco Bay Area to receive snowfall and the mountain pass which links the Silicon Valley and Monterey Bay is closed at this spot when snowfall is too heavy. The next town to the south is Scotts Valley and to the north Redwood Estates. The area serves as a rest stop with food for people traveling across the mountains.

Before 1906, there were lakes in the area around Summit that locals used for recreation and fishing, but these lakes dried up after the 1906 San Francisco Earthquake diverted their sources. The original road between Santa Cruz and Santa Clara counties passed somewhat east of the current site of Summit, which came into being when California State Route 17 was constructed in the 1930s. Several businesses can be found in Summit today, most of them dating from the 1950s.

Summit straddles the county line with Santa Clara County and is south of the unincorporated area of Lexington Hills with which it shares a zip code. The ZIP Code is 95033 and the community is served by area code 408.
