= Sciots Camp, California =

Unincorporated community in California, United States

Sciots Camp
- Unincorporated community
- Location in California Sciots Camp (the United States)
- Coordinates: 38°47′10″N 120°09′13″W
- Country: United States
- State: California
- County: El Dorado
- Elevation: 5,659 ft (1,725 m)

Sciots Camp (formerly Sciot Camp) is a small unincorporated community in El Dorado County, California, United States. It is located on the South Fork of the American River, 4 miles (6.4 km) south of Pyramid Peak, at an elevation of 5659 feet (1725 m). The ZIP code is 95610. The community is served by area code 530. Sciots Camp is a USFS Recreation Residences community.
