= Area codes 707 and 369 =

Area codes in northwestern California, United States

Coordinates: 39.8°N 123.6°W

Numbering plan areas in California (blue) and border states. Area code 707 is shown in red.

Area codes 707 and 369 are telephone area codes in the North American Numbering Plan (NANP) for the northwestern part of the U.S. state of California. The area codes serve some parts of the northern San Francisco Bay Area, as well as the North Coast. Major cities in the area codes include Napa, Sebastopol, Vallejo, Benicia, Fairfield, Santa Rosa, Windsor, Healdsburg, Rohnert Park, Petaluma, Fort Bragg, Rio Vista, Crescent City, Eureka, Clearlake, Vacaville, Dixon, and Ukiah. 707 was created by a split of area code 415 in 1959. Area code 369 was added to the numbering plan area (NPA) on February 1, 2023, to form an overlay numbering plan in the service area.

== History ==
When the American Telephone and Telegraph Company (AT&T) devised the first comprehensive telephone numbering plan for the North American continent in 1947, the far northern part of California received area code 916, with the exclusion of the city of Sacramento, which used area code 415. California area codes were reorganized geographically in 1950, so that 916 was assigned to a numbering plan area that comprised only the northeastern part from the Sierra Nevada to the Central Valley. The coastal area to the west was assigned area code 415. With this change, Sacramento was also changed to area code 916.

In 1959 numbering plan area 415 was divided in a flash-cut (without permissive dialing period) in which the northern part of the numbering plan area (Solano County and north thereof) received area code 707, which was California's eighth area code (along with 213, 415, 916, 714, 408, 805, and 209), and the last new area code in the state until 619 was added in 1982.

When area code 530 was split from area code 916 on November 1, 1997, the Dixon area was renumbered from area code 916 to 707 and switched from the Sacramento local access and transport area (LATA) into the San Francisco LATA.

707 was the last of California's thirteen area codes with only 0 or 1 in middle position, the others being 310, 510, 818 and 909, all of which, in addition to 619, were introduced decades after 707's debut) to require relief from a "new format" area code (those with 2–8 as their middle digit, which were introduced beginning in 1995 when the NANP ran out of the original format NPAs), despite explosive growth in the area, particularly its southern portion, as well as the proliferation of cell phones and pagers.

In 1999, a three-way, two-phase split of area code 707 was scheduled by Pacific Bell such that a new area code (627) would have served most of Napa and Sonoma counties and small portions of Marin and Mendocino counties, while another new area code (369) would have served Solano County as well as a small portion of Napa County, beginning in December 2000 and October 2001, respectively. However, due to the success of number pooling in preserving numbering resources, the California Public Utilities Commission cancelled these actions on July 27, 2000. Still, after twenty more years of continued growth in the region, it was determined that 707 would indeed require relief. On August 1, 2022, the NANP Administrator set the effective implementation date of the overlay of 707 by the new 369 NPA to February 1, 2023.

Prior to October 2021, area code 707 had telephone numbers assigned for the central office code 988. In 2020, 988 was designated nationwide as a dialing code for the National Suicide Prevention Lifeline, which created a conflict for exchanges that permit seven-digit dialing. This area code was therefore scheduled to transition to ten-digit dialing by October 24, 2021.

== Service area ==
=== Del Norte County ===
- Bertsch-Oceanview
- Crescent City
- Crescent City North
- Fort Dick
- Gasquet
- Hiouchi
- Klamath
- Northcrest
- Pelican Bay State Prison
- Smith River

=== Humboldt County ===
- Alderpoint
- Alton
- Arcata
- Bayside
- Bayview
- Blocksburg
- Blue Lake
- Bridgeville
- Carlotta
- Cutten
- Eureka
- Fernbridge
- Ferndale
- Fieldbrook
- Fields Landing
- Fortuna
- Garberville
- Honeydew
- Humboldt Hill
- Hydesville
- Loleta
- Kneeland
- Korbel
- Manila
- McKinleyville
- Miranda
- Myers Flat
- Myrtletown
- Orick
- Pepperwood
- Petrolia
- Phillipsville
- Pine Hills
- Redcrest
- Redway
- Rio Dell
- Samoa
- Scotia
- Shelter Cove
- Trinidad
- Weott
- Westhaven-Moonstone
- Willow Creek
- Whitethorn

=== Lake County ===
- Clearlake
- Clearlake Oaks
- Clearlake Park
- Clearlake Rivieras
- Cobb
- Finley
- Glenhaven
- Hidden Valley Lake
- Kelseyville
- Lake Pillsbury
- Lakeport
- Loch Lomond
- Lower Lake
- Lucerne
- Middletown
- Nice
- North Lakeport
- Sulphur Bank Rancheria
- Upper Lake
- Whispering Pines
- Witter Springs

=== Marin County ===
- Dillon Beach
- Fallon
- Tomales

=== Mendocino County ===
- Albion
- Boonville
- Branscomb
- Calpella
- Caspar
- Cleone
- Comptche
- Covelo
- Dos Rios
- Elk
- Fort Bragg
- Gualala
- Hopland
- Inglenook
- Keene Summit
- Laytonville
- Leggett
- Little River
- Manchester
- Mendocino
- Navarro
- Noyo
- Philo
- Piercy
- Point Arena
- Potter Valley
- Pudding Creek
- Redwood Lodge
- Redwood Valley
- Rockport
- Sherwood Valley Rancheria
- Talmage
- Ukiah
- Westport
- Willits
- Yorkville

=== Napa County ===
- Aetna Springs
- American Canyon
- Angwin
- Calistoga
- Circle Oaks
- Deer Park
- Napa
- Oakville
- Pope Valley
- Rutherford
- Spanish Flat
- St. Helena
- Vichy Springs
- Yountville
- Zinfandel

=== Solano County ===
- Benicia
- Birds Landing
- Collinsville
- Cordelia
- Dixon
- Elmira
- Fairfield
- Green Valley
- Liberty Farms
- Rio Vista
- Suisun City
- Travis AFB
- Vacaville
- Vallejo

=== Sonoma County ===
- Asti
- Bloomfield
- Bodega Bay
- Bodega
- Boyes Hot Springs
- Camp Meeker
- Carmet
- Cazadero
- Cloverdale
- Cotati
- Duncans Mills
- El Verano
- Eldridge
- Fetters Hot Springs-Agua Caliente
- Forestville
- Fort Ross
- Fulton
- Freestone
- Geyserville
- Glen Ellen
- Graton
- Guerneville
- Guernewood Park
- Healdsburg
- Jenner
- Kenwood
- Korbel
- Lakeville
- Larkfield-Wikiup
- Mark West Springs
- Mark West
- Monte Rio
- Occidental
- Penngrove
- Petaluma
- Rio Dell
- Rio Nido
- Rohnert Park
- Roseland
- Salmon Creek
- Santa Rosa
- Schellville
- Sea Ranch
- Sebastopol
- Sonoma
- Stewarts Point
- Temelec
- Two Rock
- Valley Ford
- Villa Grande
- Vineburg
- Windsor

=== Trinity County ===
- Mad River
- Ruth
- Zenia

== See also ==
- List of California area codes
- List of North American Numbering Plan area codes

California area codes: 209/350, 213/323, 310/424, 408/669, 415/628, 510/341, 530, 559, 562, 619/858, 626, 650, 661, 707/369, 714/657, 760/442, 805/820, 818/747, 831, 909/840, 916/279, 925, 949, 951
	North: 541/458	
West: Pacific Ocean	707/369	East: 530, 916/279
	South: 415/628, 510/341, 925	
Oregon area codes: 503/971, 541/458
