= Echo Lake, California =

Unincorporated community in California, United States

Echo Lake
- Unincorporated community
- Location in California Echo Lake (the United States)
- Coordinates: 38°50′02″N 120°02′30″W
- Country: United States
- State: California
- County: El Dorado
- Elevation: 7,539 ft (2,298 m)

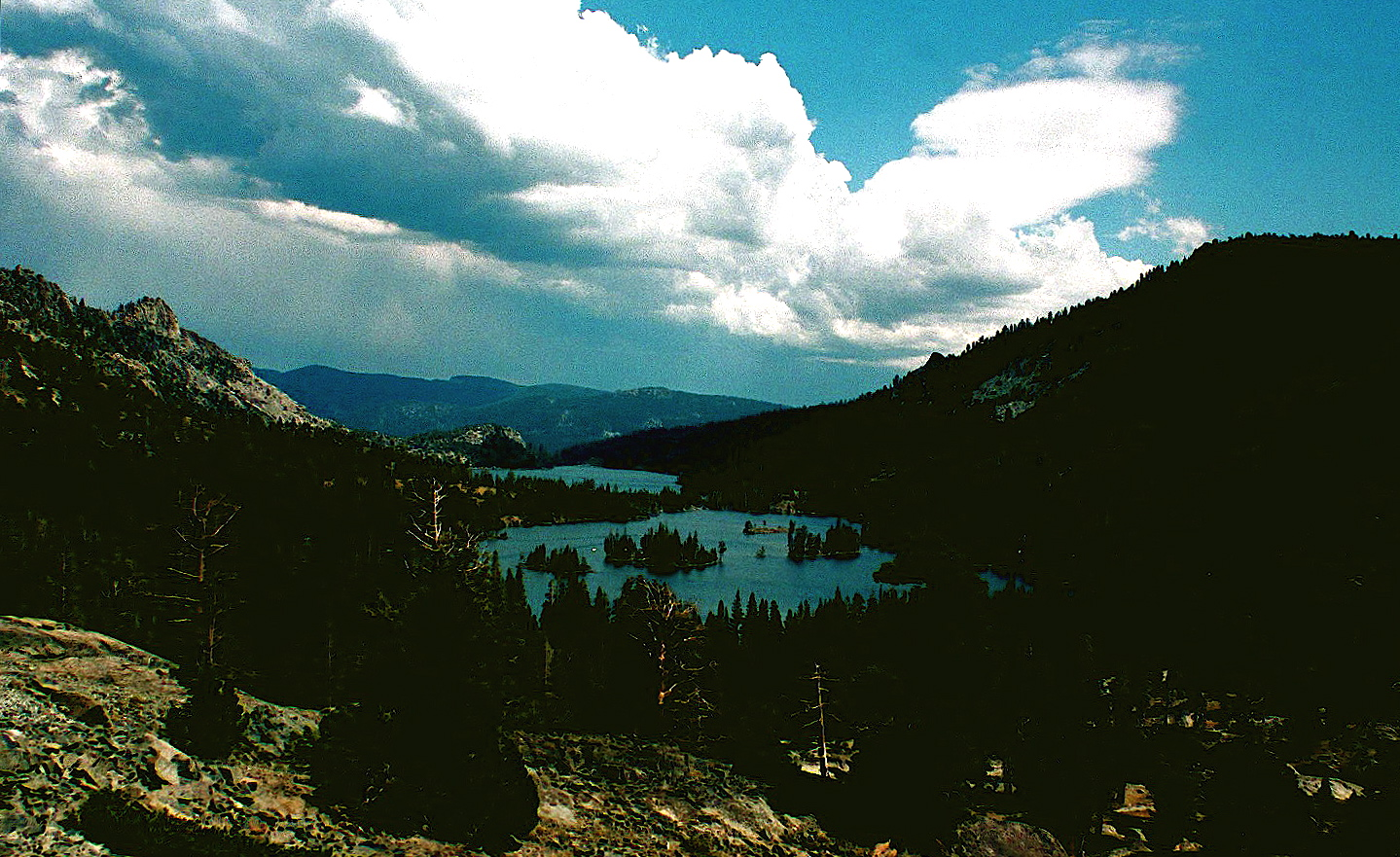

Echo Lake (formerly, Echo) is a small unincorporated community in El Dorado County, California, United States, along U.S. Route 50 in the mountains of the Sierra Nevada. It is 1.5 miles (2.4 km) north-northwest of Echo Summit. Echo Lake's nearest neighboring town is Little Norway. The ZIP code is 95721. The community is served by area code 530. The elevation of Echo Lake is 7539 feet (2298 m). The average snowpack per year is 10.5 feet, with over 15 feet of snow depositing in certain areas. Precipitation and accumulation at Echo Lake can be found in California Data Exchange Center stations located at Echo Peak (EP5) and Echo Summit (ECS).

Echo post office operated from 1888 to 1913, with a closure from 1910 to 1911. Echo Lake post office operated from 1926 to 1973.
