= Pacific, California =

Unincorporated community in California, United States

Pacific
- Unincorporated community
- Location in California Pacific (the United States)
- Coordinates: 38°45′37″N 120°30′26″W
- Country: United States
- State: California
- County: El Dorado County
- Elevation: 3,396 ft (1,035 m)

Pacific is a small unincorporated community in El Dorado County, California. It is located 3.25 miles (5 km) east of Pollock Pines, at an elevation of 3396 feet (1035 m). It lies along U.S. Highway 50. The ZIP code is 95726. The community is inside area code 530.

A post office operated in Pacific from 1880 to 1893 and from 1894 to 1958, when it was transferred to the nearby community of Pacific House.

A tornado struck Pacific on October 1, 1972, amid storms that also produced hail that accumulated 3 in (7.6 cm).

== Climate ==
Climate data for Pollock Pines, California
Month	Jan	Feb	Mar	Apr	May	Jun	Jul	Aug	Sep	Oct	Nov	Dec	Year
Record high °F (°C)	66 (19)	78 (26)	84 (29)	88 (31)	96 (36)	102 (39)	104 (40)	103 (39)	108 (42)	98 (37)	82 (28)	66 (19)	108 (42)
Mean daily maximum °F (°C)	44.4 (6.9)	49.8 (9.9)	54.7 (12.6)	63.1 (17.3)	72.3 (22.4)	82.0 (27.8)	89.3 (31.8)	89.1 (31.7)	84.0 (28.9)	69.7 (20.9)	52.2 (11.2)	43.5 (6.4)	66.2 (19.0)
Mean daily minimum °F (°C)	31.4 (−0.3)	30.6 (−0.8)	32.7 (0.4)	35.6 (2.0)	42.5 (5.8)	47.3 (8.5)	54.8 (12.7)	54.0 (12.2)	49.4 (9.7)	41.0 (5.0)	34.6 (1.4)	30.4 (−0.9)	40.4 (4.6)
Record low °F (°C)	11 (−12)	12 (−11)	13 (−11)	19 (−7)	28 (−2)	34 (1)	36 (2)	40 (4)	32 (0)	21 (−6)	11 (−12)	5 (−15)	5 (−15)
Average precipitation inches (mm)	9.66 (245)	8.77 (223)	8.83 (224)	4.92 (125)	3.17 (81)	0.91 (23)	0.04 (1.0)	0.06 (1.5)	0.55 (14)	3.00 (76)	5.40 (137)	9.38 (238)	54.69 (1,388.5)
Average snowfall inches (cm)	13.9 (35)	13.6 (35)	12.5 (32)	7.6 (19)	0.8 (2.0)	0.0 (0.0)	0.0 (0.0)	0.0 (0.0)	0.0 (0.0)	0.1 (0.25)	3.7 (9.4)	9.4 (24)	61.6 (156.65)
Source: Intellicast
