= Area codes 805 and 820 =

Area codes in central California, US

Coordinates: 34.6°N 120.2°W

Numbering plan areas in California (blue) and border states. Area code 805 is shown in red.

Area codes 805 and 820 are telephone area codes in the North American Numbering Plan (NANP) for the U.S. state of California. The numbering plan area (NPA) includes most or all of the counties of San Luis Obispo, Santa Barbara, Ventura, and the southernmost portions of Monterey County. 805 was split from area code 213 in 1957, and area code 820 was added to the NPA in 2018, creating an area code overlay.

== History ==
Area code 805 was created in 1957, when one of the original North American area codes in California, 213, was reduced in size to provide more central office codes in the Los Angeles area.

In 1998, the California-Nevada Code Administration (CNCA) determined that California was under "substantial number growth" which required exhaustion mitigation in the 805 numbering plan area, by splitting the eastern part of the NPA into a new plan area with the area code 661. The split was effective on February 13, 1999, for the San Joaquin Valley, Santa Clarita Valley, and Antelope Valley.

In August 2016, the California Public Utilities Commission held a series of hearings for the decision of providing a relief area code in NPA 805 in the form of an overlay or an area code split. On May 25, 2017, the Commission approved 820 as an overlay area code. New telephone numbers of 820 area code began service in June 2018, requiring ten-digit dialing for all calls.

In addition to the municipalities below, area code 805 also serves the US military facilities in Kwajalein, Republic of the Marshall Islands with a Paso Robles prefix (805-355). This arrangement originated from the US Army's first satellite communications station having been built at nearby Camp Roberts.

== Service area ==
=== Monterey County ===
- Bradley
- Gorda
- Bryson
- Parkfield

=== San Luis Obispo County ===
- Arroyo Grande
- Atascadero
- Avila Beach
- Baywood-Los Osos
- California Valley
- Cambria
- Cayucos
- Cholame
- Grover Beach
- Halcyon
- Harmony
- Lake Nacimiento
- Los Osos
- Morro Bay
- Nipomo
- Oceano
- Paso Robles
- Pismo Beach
- Pozo
- San Luis Obispo
- San Miguel
- San Simeon
- Santa Margarita
- Shandon
- Templeton

=== Santa Barbara County ===
- Ballard
- Buellton
- Carpinteria
- Casmalia
- Garey
- Gaviota
- Goleta
- Guadalupe
- Hope Ranch
- Isla Vista
- Lompoc
- Los Alamos
- Los Olivos
- Mission Canyon
- Mission Hills
- Montecito
- Orcutt
- Santa Barbara
- Santa Maria
- Santa Ynez
- Sisquoc
- Solvang
- Summerland
- Toro Canyon
- Vandenberg SFB
- Vandenberg Village
- Ventucopa

=== Ventura County ===
- Bardsdale
- Buckhorn
- Camarillo
- Casa Conejo
- Channel Islands Beach
- El Rio
- Fillmore
- La Conchita
- Lake Sherwood
- Meiners Oaks
- Mira Monte
- Montalvo
- Moorpark
- Newbury Park
- Oak View
- Ojai
- Oxnard
- Piru
- Point Mugu
- Port Hueneme
- Santa Paula
- Saticoy
- Simi Valley
- Somis
- Thousand Oaks
- Ventura

== See also ==
- List of California area codes
- List of North American Numbering Plan area codes

California area codes: 209/350, 213/323, 310/424, 408/669, 415/628, 510/341, 530, 559, 562, 619/858, 626, 650, 661, 707/369, 714/657, 760/442, 805/820, 818/747, 831, 909/840, 916/279, 925, 949, 951
	North: 661, 831	
West: Pacific Ocean, 808	area code 805/820	East: 559, 661, 818/747
	South: 310/424, Pacific Ocean	
Hawaii area codes: 808
