= Area codes 209 and 350 =

Area codes in northern Central Valley, California

Coordinates: 38°N 121°W

Numbering plan areas in California (blue) and border states. Area code 209 is shown in red.

Area codes 209 and 350 are telephone area codes in the North American Numbering Plan (NANP) for the U.S. state of California. Their service area includes the northern San Joaquin Valley and Sierra Foothills, including Stockton, Modesto and Merced.

Area code 209 was created in an area code split of area code 916 in 1958. On November 14, 1998, the southern half of this numbering plan area received the assignment of area code 559.

On October 24, 2021, 209 was transitioned to ten-digit dialing despite not being part of an overlay complex at that time. The area code had telephone numbers assigned for the central office code 988, which was designated as a nationwide three-digit dialing code for the 988 Suicide & Crisis Lifeline in 2022. This created a conflict for all NPAs with central office code 988 that still permitted seven-digit dialing, requiring all such NPAs to transition to ten-digit dialing.

On November 28, 2022, the 209 numbering plan area was assigned a second area code, 350, to form an overlay complex to address the impending central office code exhaustion in 209 from growth in telecommunication services. Network preparation was expedited without permissive dialing period, since ten-digit dialing was already in effect.

== Service area ==
Counties
Alpine, Amador, Calaveras, El Dorado, Mariposa, Merced, Sacramento, San Joaquin, Stanislaus, Tuolumne

Towns and cities
Acampo, Big Oak Flat, Burson, Ceres, Chinese Camp, Coarsegold, Clements, Columbia, Crows Landing, Dardanelle, Delhi, Denair, El Portal, Empire, Escalon, Farmington, French Camp, Galt, Groveland, Hathaway Pines, Herald, Hickman, Hilmar, Holt, Hornitos, Hughson, Jamestown, Keyes, Kit Carson, La Grange, Lathrop, Le Grand, Linden, Lockeford, Lodi, Long Barn, Manteca, Mi Wuk Village, Midpines, Moccasin, Modesto, Mount Aukum, Mountain House, Newman, Oakdale, Patterson, Pinecrest, Planada, Ripon, River Pines, Riverbank, Salida, Santa Rita Park, Sheep Ranch, Sonora, Soulsbyville, Standard, Stevinson, Stockton, Thornton, Tracy, Tuolumne, Turlock, Twain Harte, Vernalis, Victor, Waterford, Westley, Wilseyville, Woodbridge, and Yosemite National Park

Alpine County

- Kirkwood

Amador County

- Amador City
- Buckhorn
- Buena Vista
- Drytown
- Fiddletown
- Ham's Station
- Ione
- Jackson
- Martell
- Pine Grove
- Pioneer
- Plymouth
- Sutter Creek
- Volcano

Calaveras County

- Altaville
- Angels Camp
- Arnold
- Avery
- Calaveritas
- Campo Seco
- Cave City
- Copperopolis
- Dorrington
- Douglas Flat
- Forest Meadows
- Fourth Crossing
- Glencoe
- Jenny Lind
- Jesus Maria
- Mokelumne Hill
- Mountain Ranch
- Murphys
- Paloma
- Rail Road Flat
- Rancho Calaveras
- San Andreas
- Sandy Gulch
- Vallecito
- Valley Springs
- Wallace
- West Point

Mariposa County

- Bootjack
- Buck Meadows
- Catheys Valley
- Coulterville
- Mariposa
- Wawona
- Yosemite Valley

Merced County

- Atwater
- Ballico
- Cressey
- Delhi
- Dos Palos
- El Nido
- Gustine
- Hilmar
- Le Grand
- Livingston
- Los Banos
- Merced
- Planada
- Santa Nella
- Snelling
- South Dos Palos
- Winton

Sacramento County

- Galt
- Herald

San Joaquin County

- August
- Banta
- Country Club
- Escalon
- Farmington
- French Camp
- Garden Acres
- Kennedy
- Lathrop
- Lincoln Village
- Linden
- Lockeford
- Lodi
- Manteca
- Morada
- Mountain House
- North Woodbridge
- Ripon
- South Woodbridge
- Stockton
- Taft Mosswood
- Tracy
- Victor

Stanislaus County

- Bystrom
- Ceres
- Del Rio
- Denair
- East Oakdale
- Empire
- Grayson
- Hickman
- Hughson
- Keyes
- Knights Ferry
- Modesto
- Newman
- Oakdale
- Patterson
- Riverbank
- Riverdale Park
- Salida
- Shackelford
- Turlock
- Waterford
- West Modesto
- Westley

Tuolumne County

- Bret Harte
- Chinese Camp
- Columbia
- Confidence
- East Sonora
- Groveland-Big Oak Flat
- Jamestown
- Mi-Wuk Village
- Moccasin
- Mono Vista
- Phoenix Lake-Cedar Ridge
- Pine Mountain Lake
- Sonora
- Soulsbyville
- Strawberry
- Tuolumne City
- Twain Harte

== See also ==
- List of California area codes

California area codes: 209/350, 213/323, 310/424, 408/669, 415/628, 510/341, 530, 559, 562, 619/858, 626, 650, 661, 707/369, 714/657, 760/442, 805/820, 818/747, 831, 909/840, 916/279, 925, 949, 951
	North: 530, 916/279	
West: 408/669, 279/916, 925	209/350	East: 760/442
	South: 559, 831	
