= Plainfield, California =

Unincorporated community in California, United States

Plainfield
- Unincorporated community
- Location in California Plainfield (the United States)
- Coordinates: 38°35′27″N 121°47′49″W
- Country: United States
- State: California
- County: Yolo
- Elevation: 69 ft (21 m)
- ZIP Code: 95695
- Area code: 530

Plainfield is an unincorporated community in Yolo County, California, United States. It is located between Davis and Woodland in the central portion of the county. Plainfield's ZIP Code is 95695 and its area code 530. A post office was established in the community in 1873 but was discontinued in 1908. It lies at an elevation of 69 feet (21 m).
