= Dayton, California =

Unincorporated community in California, United States

Dayton
- Unincorporated community
- Location in California Dayton (the United States)
- Coordinates: 39°38′55″N 121°52′20″W
- Country: United States
- State: California
- County: Butte
- Elevation: 141 ft (43 m)

Dayton (formerly Day Town and Grainland) is an unincorporated town in Butte County, California, United States. It lies south of Chico at an elevation of 141 feet (43 m).

== History ==
The town began in 1859 with the arrival of Samuel Van Ness and Joseph Wiggins, who set up a trading post there. Other shops followed. A post office (named Grainland) was established in 1867 and closed later that year; it was reopened in 1873, closed again in 1892, reopened in 1893, and closed for good in 1902. Presently it gets postal service from Chico. While initially an important grain shipping point, it was eclipsed when the railroad was put through elsewhere.

== Government ==
The citizens of Dayton, as constituents of California's 3rd Assembly District, are represented by Vacant in the California State Assembly. As constituents of California's 4th Senate District, they are represented by Marie Alvarado-Gil.The town is in California's 1st congressional district, represented by Republican James Gallagher.
