= Area codes 415 and 628 =

Area codes for San Francisco and Marin County, California

Coordinates: 38°N 122.6°W

Numbering plan areas in California (blue) and border states. Area codes 415 and 628 are shown in red.

Area codes 415 and 628 are telephone area codes in the North American Numbering Plan (NANP) for the city of San Francisco and its northern suburbs in Marin County (across the Golden Gate), and the northeast corner of San Mateo County in the U.S. state of California. Area code 415 was one of the eighty-six original North American area codes established in 1947, but modified in geographic configuration later. Area code 628 was assigned in 2015 to form an overlay in that numbering plan area in mitigation of central office prefix exhaustion.

== History ==
When the American Telephone and Telegraph Company (AT&T) introduced the first nationwide telephone numbering plan for Operator Toll Dialing in 1947, the state of California was divided into three geographical numbering plan areas (NPAs). Area code 415 was assigned to central California, with area code 916 assigned to the northern part and area code 213 assigned to the southern part. Originally, 415 stretched from Sacramento in the north to Bakersfield in the south.

In 1950, the boundaries of the numbering plan areas of California were redrawn to produce a division of the northern and central parts along a north–south dividing line. 415 was designated to the coastal region from the North Coast to the Oregon border, while 916 comprised the northeastern corner of the state. As a result of this realignment, Sacramento was reassigned from 415 to 916, and Bakersfield to 213.

With the preparations for nation-wide direct distance dialing (DDD) in the early 1950s, area code 318 was temporarily used in the San Francisco area, initially by customers in Englewood, New Jersey, participating in the first customer trials to reach the city, as well as some areas north of the Golden Gate. In 1953, the entire Bay Area was enumerated again with area code 415.

Numbering plan area 415 has been split several times due to population growth and infrastructure changes.

In a three-way split in 1959, area code 707 was created from the northern part, and area code 408 was created for San Jose, the South Bay, the Monterey Bay, and the Salinas Valley. (408 has since been split to 831 and overlaid with 669. 707 has since been overlaid with 369.)

On September 2, 1991, area code 510 was created for the East Bay, including Oakland. (510 has since been split to 925 and was overlaid by 341 in 2019.)

On August 2, 1997, area code 650 was created for most of San Mateo County. The partition approximately followed the boundary between San Francisco, which (along with Marin County) kept 415, and San Mateo County. Deviations from the county line included a very small area east of the San Francisco Golf Club, which was changed to 650, and portions of Brisbane and Daly City, which remained in 415.

On February 21, 2015, the numbering plan area was converted to an overlay complex by adding area code 628 to the same service area, making ten-digit dialing mandatory in the area, with prefix 1 from landlines.

== Service area ==
=== City and County of San Francisco ===
- San Francisco

=== Marin County ===
- Bel Marin Keys
- Belvedere
- Black Point-Green Point
- Bolinas
- California Park
- Corte Madera
- Dogtown
- Fairfax
- Greenbrae
- Ignacio
- Inverness Park
- Inverness
- Kentfield
- Lagunitas-Forest Knolls
- Larkspur
- Lucas Valley-Marinwood
- Manor
- Marconi
- Marin City
- Marshall
- McNears Beach
- Mill Valley
- Muir Beach
- Nicasio
- Novato
- Olema
- Paradise Cay
- Point Reyes Station
- Ross
- San Anselmo
- San Geronimo
- San Quentin
- San Rafael
- Santa Venetia
- Sausalito
- Sleepy Hollow
- Stinson Beach
- Strawberry
- Tamalpais-Homestead Valley
- Tiburon
- Woodacre

=== San Mateo County ===
- Brisbane
- Daly City

== See also ==
- List of California area codes
- List of North American Numbering Plan area codes

California area codes: 209/350, 213/323, 310/424, 408/669, 415/628, 510/341, 530, 559, 562, 619/858, 626, 650, 661, 707/369, 714/657, 760/442, 805/820, 818/747, 831, 909/840, 916/279, 925, 949, 951
	North: 707/369	
West: Pacific Ocean, 808	415/628	East: 510/341, 925
	South: 650	
Hawaii area codes: 808
