= Area code 951 =

Area code for western Riverside County, California

Coordinates: 33°44′N 117°01′W

Numbering plan areas in California (blue) and border states. Area code 951 is shown in red.

Area code 951 is a telephone area code in the North American Numbering Plan for western Riverside County in the southern part of the U.S. state of California. It was assigned in 2004 to a new numbering plan area (NPA) that was created by an area code split of area code 909.

== History ==
In 1947, when the American Telephone and Telegraph Company (AT&T) devised the first nationwide telephone numbering plan and assigned the original North American area codes, the state of California was divided into three numbering plan areas: 213, 415, and 916, for the southern, central, and northern parts of the state, respectively. The area served by 213 extended from the Mexican border to the Central Coast. Starting in the 1950s, Southern California experienced rapid expansion of telephone service, requiring area code 213 to be split five times by 1998. The first split became necessary in 1951, when most of the southern and eastern portion, including San Diego and most of Orange County, was assigned area code 714. The 714 numbering plan area was further divided on November 14, 1992, when area code 909 was assigned to the majority of Riverside, San Bernardino, Ontario, and Pomona.

On July 17, 2004, numbering plan area 909 was divided in a two-way geographic split for assignment of area code 951 to the southern portion of 909. The new numbering plan area comprised western Riverside County, including the cities and communities of Banning, Beaumont, Corona, Canyon Lake, Riverside, Temescal Valley, Woodcrest, Moreno Valley, Perris, Menifee, Lake Elsinore, Wildomar, Murrieta, Temecula, San Jacinto, Hemet, Lakeview, Nuevo, Norco, Eastvale, Jurupa Valley, and Idyllwild.

The creation of area code 951 is the latest area code split in California. All codes introduced in the state since have been overlays.

Prior to October 2021, area code 951 had telephone numbers assigned for the central office code 988. In 2020, 988 was designated nationwide as a dialing code for the National Suicide Prevention Lifeline, which created a conflict for exchanges that permit seven-digit dialing. This area code was therefore scheduled to transition to ten-digit dialing by October 24, 2021.

== Service area ==
=== Riverside County ===
- Aguanga
- Anza
- Banning
- Beaumont
- Cabazon
- Calimesa (mostly in NPA 909)
- Canyon Lake
- Cherry Valley
- Corona (small portion in NPA 909)
- East Hemet
- Eastvale (small portion in NPA 909)
- Hemet
- Highgrove
- Home Gardens
- Homeland
- Idyllwild-Pine Cove
- Jurupa Valley
- Lake Elsinore
- Lakeland Village
- Lakeview
- March Air Reserve Base
- Menifee
- Moreno Valley
- Murrieta
- Norco
- Nuevo
- Perris
- Riverside
- San Jacinto
- Temecula
- Valle Vista
- Wildomar
- Winchester

=== San Bernardino County ===
- Colton (mostly in NPA 909)
- Grand Terrace (mostly in NPA 909)

== See also ==
- List of California area codes
- List of North American Numbering Plan area codes

California area codes: 209/350, 213/323, 310/424, 408/669, 415/628, 510/341, 530, 559, 562, 619/858, 626, 650, 661, 707/369, 714/657, 760/442, 805/820, 818/747, 831, 909/840, 916/279, 925, 949, 951
	North: 909/840	
West: 714/657, 949	951	East: 760/442
	South: 760/442	
