= Area codes 510 and 341 =

Telephone area codes for the western East Bay of California

Coordinates: 37.7°N 122.1°W

Numbering plan areas in California (blue) and border states. Area code 510 is shown in red.

Area codes 510 and 341 are telephone area codes in the North American Numbering Plan (NANP) serving much of the East Bay in the U.S. state of California. The numbering plan area (NPA) includes parts of Contra Costa County and western Alameda County, including the city of Oakland, but excludes Dublin, Livermore, Pleasanton, and Sunol. Area code 510 was established in 1991 in a split of area code 415, and 341 was added to the numbering plan area in 2019.

== History ==
Area code 510 was established on September 2, 1991, in an area code split of the 415 numbering plan area. On March 14, 1998, the inland portion of the East Bay was split off with area code 925. The dividing line followed the Berkeley Hills; almost everything west of the hills stayed in NPA 510, while everything east of the hills received the new area code.

By 2016, the California Public Utilities Commission (CPUC) projected that NPA 510 would exhaust its numbering pool by the second quarter of 2019. In response, the commission held mitigation meetings in Berkeley, Oakland, and Hayward in January and February 2017. The North American Numbering Plan Administrator (NANPA) proposed in May 2017 an overlay complex for the numbering plan area with new area code 341. NANPA had previously assigned 341 as the relief area code in 1999, but nationwide number pooling procedures eliminated the need at that time. The NANPA retained 341 for the then-future relief of 510. CPUC accepted the relief plan on June 21, 2018. With the start of the overlay in July 2019, customers in the numbering plan area can be assigned telephone numbers with either code, and must dial the area code for all calls.

New central office codes in 341 became available on July 22, 2019. Ten-digit dialing became mandatory in the East Bay a month earlier, on June 22.

== Prior usage of 510 for TWX ==
In 1962, AT&T assigned NPA 510 for conversion to dial service of the Teletypewriter Exchange Service (TWX) in the United States. Telex use of area code 510 was decommissioned in 1981 after conversion of the service to new transmission technologies by Western Union.

== Service area ==
The service area contains the following cities in two counties.

=== Alameda County ===
- Alameda
- Albany
- Ashland
- Berkeley
- Castro Valley
- Cherryland
- Emeryville
- Fairview
- Fremont
- Hayward
- Newark
- Oakland
- Piedmont
- San Leandro
- San Lorenzo
- Union City

=== Contra Costa County ===
- Bayview
- Canyon
- Crockett
- East Richmond Heights
- El Cerrito
- El Sobrante
- Hercules
- Kensington
- Montalvin Manor
- North Richmond
- Pinole
- Port Costa
- Richmond
- Rodeo
- Rollingwood
- San Pablo
- Tara Hills

== See also ==
- List of California area codes

California area codes: 209/350, 213/323, 310/424, 408/669, 415/628, 510/341, 530, 559, 562, 619/858, 626, 650, 661, 707/369, 714/657, 760/442, 805/820, 818/747, 831, 909/840, 916/279, 925, 949, 951
	North: 369/707	
West: 415/628, 650	341/510	East: 925
	South: 408/669	
