= Area code 562 =

Area code in southern California

Coordinates: 33.9°N 118.1°W

Numbering plan areas in California (blue) and border states. Area code 562 is shown in red.

Area code 562 is a telephone area code in the North American Numbering Plan for much of southeastern Los Angeles County in the U.S. state of California. The numbering plan area also includes Long Beach, and parts of northern Orange County. The area code was created in an area code split of area code 310 on January 25, 1997.

== History ==
Prior to November 2, 1991, this region had been part of area code 213. On that date, most of the western and southern portions of the old 213 region became area code 310. On January 25, 1997, the southern portion of the old 310 territory split again to become the 562 area code.

562 was originally intended to be an overlay code exclusively for cellular telephones and pagers in the 310 numbering plan area in late 1995. However, the overlay (and all others in CA since 2008) was cancelled after cellular companies sued the California Public Utilities Commission to prevent a repeat of a similar split in New York City, where all 212 and 718 mobile customers were changed over to a new 917 NPA. Cellular technology was relatively new, and the industry argued that separate area codes for cellular customers created a stigma and would hurt sales as people wanted their home and cell phone numbers to be in the same area code. After years in court, the CPUC sided with the cellular industry, and so plans were made to split 310 instead.

Prior to October 2021, area code 562 had telephone numbers assigned for the central office code 988. In 2020, 988 was designated nationwide as a dialing code for the National Suicide Prevention Lifeline, which created a conflict for exchanges that permit seven-digit dialing. This area code was therefore scheduled to transition to ten-digit dialing by October 24, 2021.

== Service area ==
The numbering plan area comprises Los Angeles County and the cities of Seal Beach and Los Alamitos, which are in the very northwest corner of the Orange County coastline, portions of the city of La Habra, and the very small and northwest part of the city of Brea in the very northwest corner of inland Orange County. These exceptions exist because, at the time of 310's creation, Pacific Bell (now part of AT&T Inc.) was the primary telephone company for most of Southern California, whereas this region's primary telephone company was GTE (later Verizon and now part of Frontier). When 310 was created from the southern portion of the old 213 territory, Pacific Bell chose to move all of GTE's area code 213 exchanges into the 310 area code. As the primary telephone provider in Southern California.

=== Los Angeles County ===
- Artesia
- Bell Gardens (also in the 213/323 NPA)
- Bellflower
- Cerritos (small portion in the 657/714 NPA)
- Commerce (mostly in the 213/323 NPA)
- Downey
- East Whittier
- Hacienda Heights (mostly in the 626 NPA)
- Hawaiian Gardens
- Industry (mostly in the 626 NPA and small portion in the 840/909 NPA)
- La Habra Heights
- La Mirada (small portion in the 657/714 NPA)
- Lakewood
- Long Beach
- Norwalk
- Paramount
- Pico Rivera
- Rowland Heights (mostly in the 626 and 840/909 NPAs)
- Santa Fe Springs
- Signal Hill
- South Gate (mostly in the 213/323 NPA and small portion in 310/424)
- South Whittier
- West Whittier-Los Nietos
- Whittier

=== Orange County ===
- Brea (mostly in the 657/714 NPA)
- Buena Park (mostly in the 657/714 NPA)
- Cypress (mostly in the 657/714 NPA)
- Fullerton (mostly in the 657/714 NPA)
- Huntington Beach (mostly in the 657/714 NPA; only the Sunset Beach neighborhood is in the 562 NPA)
- La Habra (small portion in the 657/714 NPA)
- La Palma (mostly in the 657/714 NPA)
- Los Alamitos (small portion in the 657/714 NPA)
- Rossmoor
- Seal Beach

== See also ==
- List of California area codes
- List of North American Numbering Plan area codes

California area codes: 209/350, 213/323, 310/424, 408/669, 415/628, 510/341, 530, 559, 562, 619/858, 626, 650, 661, 707/369, 714/657, 760/442, 805/820, 818/747, 831, 909/840, 916/279, 925, 949, 951
	North: 626, 213/323	
West: 310/424, 213/323	area code 562	East: 657/714
	South: Pacific Ocean	
