= Area codes 760 and 442 =

Area codes for southern and eastern California

Coordinates: 35°N 116°W

Numbering plan areas in California (blue) and border states. Area codes 442 and 760 are shown in red.

Area codes 760 and 442 are telephone area codes in the North American Numbering Plan (NANP) for the U.S. state of California. These area codes serve an overlay complex that comprises much of the southeastern and southernmost portions of California. It includes Imperial, Inyo, and Mono counties, as well as portions of San Diego, Riverside, San Bernardino, Los Angeles, and Kern counties. Area code 760 was created on March 22, 1997, in a split of area code 619. Area code 442 was added to the same area on November 21, 2009.

== History ==
Area code 760 was split from 619 in 1997, and 619 had been split from area code 714 in 1982. Within a decade of creation, the proliferation of cell phones and pagers left area code 760 under the threat of exhausting its central office prefixes. The initial relief plan was another area code split, with the San Diego and Imperial areas moving to a new 442 area code. However, this met with protests from businesses who did not want to change their numbers for the second time in a decade. Ultimately, the California Public Utilities Commission decided that 442 would be added as an overlay to 760. Since 2009 all users in the region have been required to include the area code even when dialing local calls.

Comprising 46,666 square miles (120,860 km^{2}), it is the largest numbering plan area in California, with approximately 29% of the state's land area served by the overlay complex.

== Service area ==
The following communities are located in the numbering plan area, in their respective counties.

=== Imperial County ===
- Andrade
- Bombay Beach
- Brawley
- Calexico
- Calipatria
- Desert Shores
- El Centro
- Heber
- Holtville
- Imperial
- Mount Signal
- Niland
- Ocotillo
- Ogilby
- Palo Verde
- Plaster City
- Salton City
- Salton Sea Beach
- Seeley
- Westmorland
- Winterhaven

=== Inyo County ===
- Ballarat
- Big Pine
- Bishop
- Cartago
- Darwin
- Death Valley Junction
- Dixon Lane-Meadow Creek
- Furnace Creek
- Homewood Canyon-Valley Wells
- Independence
- Keeler
- Laws
- Lone Pine
- Mesa
- Olancha
- Panamint Springs
- Pearsonville
- Round Valley
- Shoshone
- Tecopa
- West Bishop
- Wilkerson

=== Kern County ===
- Bodfish
- Boron
- California City
- Cantil
- China Lake Acres
- Inyokern
- Johannesburg
- Kernville
- Lake Isabella
- Mountain Mesa
- Onyx
- Randsburg
- Ridgecrest
- Ridgecrest Heights
- South Lake
- Squirrel Mountain Valley
- Weldon
- Wofford Heights

=== Los Angeles County ===
- Big Pines
- Jackson Lake

=== Mono County ===
- Benton
- Bodie
- Bridgeport
- Chalfant
- Coleville
- Lee Vining
- Mammoth Lakes
- Swall Meadows

=== Riverside County ===
- Bermuda Dunes
- Blythe
- Cathedral City
- Chiriaco Summit
- Coachella
- Desert Center
- Desert Hot Springs
- Eagle Mountain
- East Blythe
- Indian Wells
- Indio
- La Quinta
- Lost Lake
- Mecca
- North Shore
- Palm Desert
- Palm Springs
- Rancho Mirage
- Ripley
- Palm Desert
- Thermal
- Thousand Palms
- White Water

=== San Bernardino County ===
- Adelanto
- Amboy
- Apple Valley
- Bagdad
- Baker
- Barstow
- Big River
- Bluewater
- Cadiz
- Calico
- Chambless
- Cima
- Daggett
- Earp
- Essex
- Fort Irwin
- Goffs
- Halloran Springs
- Helendale
- Hesperia
- Hinkley
- Joshua Tree
- Kelso
- Landers
- Lenwood
- Lucerne Valley
- Ludlow
- Twentynine Palms Marine Base
- Morongo Valley
- Mountain View Acres
- Nebo Center
- Needles
- Newberry Springs
- Nipton
- Oro Grande
- Phelan
- Piñon Hills
- Pioneertown
- Rice
- Running Springs
- Siberia
- Sunfair Heights
- Sunfair
- Searles Valley
- Trona
- Twentynine Palms
- Victorville
- Vidal Junction
- Vidal
- Wrightwood
- Yermo
- Yucca Valley
- Zzyzx

=== San Diego County ===
- Bonsall
- Borrego Springs
- Camp Pendleton North
- Camp Pendleton South
- Carlsbad
- Encinitas
- Escondido
- Fallbrook
- Hidden Meadows
- Julian
- Lake San Marcos
- Oceanside
- Ocotillo Wells
- Pala
- Rainbow
- Ramona
- San Marcos
- Santa Ysabel
- Valley Center
- Vista

== See also ==
- List of California area codes
- List of North American Numbering Plan area codes

California area codes: 209/350, 213/323, 310/424, 408/669, 415/628, 510/341, 530, 559, 562, 619/858, 626, 650, 661, 707/369, 714/657, 760/442, 805/820, 818/747, 831, 909/840, 916/279, 925, 949, 951
	North: 530, 702/725, 775	
West: 209/350, 559, 619/858, 626, 661, 808, 909/840, 949, 951	442/760	East: 928
	South: 619/858, Country code +52 in Mexico	
Arizona area codes: 520, 602/480/623, 928
Nevada area codes: 702/725, 775
Hawaii area codes: 808
