= Area code 626 =

Area code for the San Gabriel Valley of California

Coordinates: 34.0930°N 117.9841°W

Numbering plan areas in California (blue) and border states. Area code 626 is shown in red.

Area code 626 is a telephone area code in the North American Numbering Plan (NANP) for most of the San Gabriel Valley in the U.S. state of California. The numbering plan area (NPA) also comprises nearby areas in the northeastern portion of Los Angeles County, California, including Arcadia, Monrovia, El Monte, most of Pasadena and West Covina. The numbering plan area was created in an area code split of area code 818 on June 14, 1997.

== History ==
The service area was originally contained in numbering plan area 213, which was split to create 818 in 1983, before splitting again in 1997.

Prior to October 2021, area code 626 had telephone numbers assigned for the central office code 988. In 2020, 988 was designated nationwide as a dialing code for the National Suicide Prevention Lifeline, which created a conflict for exchanges that permit seven-digit dialing. This area code was therefore scheduled to transition to ten-digit dialing by October 24, 2021.

== Service area ==
- Alhambra (small portion in NPA 213/323)
- Altadena
- Arcadia
- Avocado Heights
- Azusa
- Baldwin Park
- Bassett
- Bradbury
- Charter Oak
- Citrus
- Covina
- Duarte
- East Pasadena
- East San Gabriel
- El Monte
- Glendora (small part in 909)
- Hacienda Heights (small part in 562)
- Industry (small part in 562 and 909)
- Irwindale
- La Puente
- Mayflower Village
- Monrovia
- Monterey Park (also in 213/323)
- North El Monte
- Pasadena (small part in 213/323)
- Rosemead (small part in the 213/323 area code)
- Rowland Heights (also in the NPA 909 and small part in NPA 562)
- San Gabriel
- San Marino
- Sierra Madre
- South El Monte
- South Pasadena (also in NPA 213/323)
- South San Gabriel
- South San Jose Hills
- Temple City
- Valinda
- Vincent
- Walnut (mostly in NPA 909)
- West Covina (small part in the 909 area code)
- West Puente Valley

== See also ==
- List of California area codes
- List of North American Numbering Plan area codes

California area codes: 209/350, 213/323, 310/424, 408/669, 415/628, 510/341, 530, 559, 562, 619/858, 626, 650, 661, 707/369, 714/657, 760/442, 805/820, 818/747, 831, 909/840, 916/279, 925, 949, 951
	North: 661	
West: 213/323, 747/818	626	East: 442/760, 840/909
	South: 562, 657/714	
