= Area code 949 =

Telephone area code for southern Orange County, California

Coordinates: 33.6°N 117.7°W

Numbering plan areas in California (blue) and border states. Area code 949 is shown in red.

Area code 949 is a telephone area code in the North American Numbering Plan (NANP) for the U.S. state of California in southern Orange County. The area code was activated for service on April 18, 1998, to a numbering plan area that resulted from a split of area code 714 with a boundary change to exclude the southern cities of Orange County, where the existing central office codes were retained in the new area code.

== Service area ==
- Aliso Viejo
- Costa Mesa (primarily the Westside)
- Coto de Caza
- Dana Point
- Irvine (small portion in the 657/714 area code)
- Ladera Ranch
- Laguna Beach
- Laguna Hills
- Laguna Niguel
- Laguna Woods
- Lake Forest
- Las Flores
- Mission Viejo
- Newport Beach
- Rancho Mission Viejo
- Rancho Santa Margarita
- San Clemente
- San Juan Capistrano
- Santa Ana (mostly in the 657/714 area code)
- Trabuco Canyon
- Tustin (mostly in the 657/714 area code)

The city of Costa Mesa is partitioned between area codes 949 and 714, being split at Wilson Street and along Newport Boulevard. A small section of Irvine also uses 714, from the north side of Culver Drive at Interstate 5 to Jamboree Road in the Marketplace, in the neighborhood of Northpark Irvine.

== See also ==
- List of California area codes
- List of North American Numbering Plan area codes

California area codes: 209/350, 213/323, 310/424, 408/669, 415/628, 510/341, 530, 559, 562, 619/858, 626, 650, 661, 707/369, 714/657, 760/442, 805/820, 818/747, 831, 909/840, 916/279, 925, 949, 951
	North: 714/657	
West: 310/424 (offshore islands), 808, Pacific Ocean	949	East: 951
	South: 760/442	
Hawaii area codes: 808
