= Area codes 408 and 669 =

Area codes that serve the southern San Francisco Bay Area, California

Numbering plan areas in California (blue) and border states. Area codes 408 and 669 are shown in red.

Area codes 408 and 669 are telephone area codes in the North American Numbering Plan (NANP) in the U.S. state of California. The numbering plan area comprises most of Santa Clara County and Northern Santa Cruz County, and includes Gilroy, Morgan Hill, Saratoga, Los Gatos, Monte Sereno, Milpitas, Sunnyvale, Santa Clara, Cupertino, Campbell, and San Jose.

Area code 408 was split from area code 415 in 1959. The numbering plan area was reduced in geographic extent in 1998 for the creation of area code 831. In 2012, area code 669 was assigned as a second area code for same numbering plan area by overlay.

== History ==
In 1947, the American Telephone and Telegraph Company (AT&T) devised the first nationwide telephone numbering plan and assigned the original North American area codes. The state of California was divided into three numbering plan areas (NPAs) with distinct area codes: 213, 415, and 916, for the southern, central, and northern parts of the state, respectively. California area codes were reorganized geographically in 1950, so that 916 was assigned to a numbering plan area that comprised only the northeastern part from the Sierra Nevada to the Central Valley. The coastal area to the west was assigned area code 415.

Area code 408 was split from numbering plan area 415 in a flash-cut (without permissive dialing period) on March 1, 1959. The new numbering plan area included most of Santa Clara, Santa Cruz, Monterey and San Benito Counties.

In 1997, the California/Nevada Code Administrator (C/NCA) advised the North American Numbering Plan Administration (NANPA) of the need for area code relief in the 408 numbering plan area. A geographic area code split had been approved by the California Public Utilities Commission (CPUC) which would install area code 831 for a new numbering plan area comprising the communities of Santa Cruz, Salinas, Monterey, and Hollister. Area code 408 would be retained in Sunnyvale, San Jose, Los Gatos, and Gilroy. The area code split became effective on July 11, 1998, with a permissive dialing period ending on February 20, 1999.

Months later, by late 1998, continued growth in telecommunication services in Northern California required further area code relief for the 408 numbering plan area. A November 1998 relief plan was approved by the CPUC that proposed an overlay complex for NPA 408, with the new area code 669. However, by December 1999, the CPUC suspended the 408 overlay, along with all other then-scheduled overlay relief actions (NPAs 415, 510, 650, 714, and 909), due to the implementation of telephone number pooling, a more efficient number allocation method.

Telephone number pooling staved off exhaustion for over a decade, but by 2011, the 408 area code was forecast to require relief by the second quarter of 2012. From May to October 2011, public feedback was solicited in the area. On October 20, 2011, the California Public Utilities Commission confirmed implementing 669 as an overlay to the existing 408 numbering plan area, the first in the San Francisco Bay Area. The new area code's official in-service date was November 20, 2012, when new central office codes could be activated. A six-month permissive dialing period was conducted from April 21 to October 20 during which calls could be initiated by seven- or ten-digit dialing. Ten-digit dialing also required the prefix digit 1 (1+10-digit dialing).

AT&T telephone bills, shortly before the overlay was to go into effect, included the following information for 408 area code customers:

- Effective April 21, 2012, you should begin the new dialing procedures ([i.e., to use the area code) whenever you place a call from the 408 area code. If you forget and dial just seven digits, your call will still be completed.
- Beginning October 20, 2012, you must use the new dialing procedures (...) for all calls. After this date, if you do not use the new dialing procedures, your call will not be completed and a recording will instruct you to hang up and dial again.
- Beginning November 20, 2012, new telephone lines or services may be assigned numbers using the 669 area code.

== Los Gatos ==
Los Gatos is one of three cities in Santa Clara County that were not served by the Bell System. Gilroy and Morgan Hill were also served by independent telephone companies.

According to historian Willys I. Peck, the Los Gatos Telephone Company was the first company to offer telephone service in town. Later, the Western California Telephone Company provided service to Los Gatos and to Novato, Morgan Hill, and Kenwood. In the 1970s, the utility was acquired by General Telephone and Electronics, which changed its name to GTE, and merged with Bell Atlantic in 2000 to become Verizon Communications. Verizon served these areas until April 1, 2016, when Frontier Communications acquired the service.

Los Gatos was served by three central offices. Historically, these were called the Six Office (356), the Four Office (354), and the Mountain Office (353). The first two of these designations come from the addition of an extra digit when to the historic exchange name (ELgato) when the town converted from manual to dial service. Telephone numbers had the prefix ELgato-6 and ELgato-4, respectively (dialed as ELx-xxxx.) By 1975, 358 had been added as an additional central office prefix.

The Mountain Office served the Summit Road community and areas of the Santa Cruz Mountains west of town. Although the office code or prefix for service from this switch was ELgato-3 (353), it was not referred to as the Three Office. During the 1970s and early 1980s, the area was served by Automatic Electric step-by-step (SXS) electromechanical switching equipment. The step office was a maintenance headache; it being in a rural area made the problem more difficult. Users noticed crosstalk, and dial pulsing was audible during at least some of their calls. The outside plant in the mountain area was subject to a variety of tough environmental factors, including long loop lengths and the high humidity of the redwood forest. The area is now served by remote equipment on Summit Road connected to the central office on Los Gatos Boulevard.

Before the late 1980s and the arrival of cellular and PCS mobile phone service, GTE offered Improved Mobile Telephone Service (IMTS) on VHF (152 MHz) and UHF (454 MHz) frequencies in Los Gatos. The service included full-duplex dial service. Tight restrictions were imposed on call durations because there were only a few channels available. In the late 1970s, daytime calls longer than three minutes were billed at over $1 per minute to discourage the long-winded. The VHF equipment was located near the Santa Clara Valley Water District's Rinconada Water Treatment Plant on More Avenue at NAD27 coordinates 37°15′22″N 121°58′59″W. The IMTS system included General Electric mobile radio voting equipment. (Voting is a form of diversity combining used in mobile radio systems on land.) One receiver for at least one of the voted IMTS channels was located in a pole mount-cabinet on a utility pole along Montevina Road off California State Route 17. These IMTS systems were dismantled after cellular systems became available to subscribers in the Bay Area.

== San Jose ==
=== Manual service ===
Before 1949, San Jose telephone service was manual. A subscriber would lift the receiver and wait for the operator to inquire, "Number Please?" Most telephone numbers started with Ballard or Columbia. Mayfair numbers served the east side. The City manager's telephone number was Ballard 1 while most numbers had four digits and a letter, (for example: Ballard 2345 W). One of four letters was appended to telephone numbers: J, M, R, or W to designate each station connected to the four-party line.

=== Dial service and numbering plan ===
After the conversion to dial service in 1949, San Jose telephone numbers started with names including ALpine-, ANdrews-, BAldwin-, CLayburn-, and CYpress-. As the North American Numbering Plan evolved in the 1950s, these became today's 25x-, 26x-, 22x-, 258-, and 29x-numbers, respectively.

Until the late 1970s, central office code protection was maintained between area codes 415 and 408, so that Telephone numbers were not duplicated across, and subscribers could dial seven-digit San Francisco or Berkeley numbers without dialing an area code. Population growth, facsimile machines, and pagers caused demands for numbers to outrun the capacity of this arrangement. The additional demands for PCS and cellular phone numbers helped necessitate the 831/408 area code split, the 650/415 split, and the earlier 510/415 split.

Part of the previous dialing plan included a mass calling prefix for radio station contests, introduced in the 1960s because some contests put unacceptable loads on the Bay Area's telephone switches. Until the 1980s, radio station call-in contests throughout the Bay Area used 575-numbers. Electromechanical switching equipment of the day had been engineered to accommodate large call volumes to 575-numbers. Large numbers of calls would otherwise have overloaded switching equipment causing slow dial tone and blocked long-distance circuits.

A patchwork quilt of electromechanical switching equipment handled San Jose calls between 1949 and the 1980s. There were about eight Western Electric Crossbar switches, at least one Number 1 and mostly Number 5. There was a Western Electric 4A Crossbar that took up two floors of the Main telephone exchange. In the mid-1980s, the 4A crossbar was replaced with a digital switch which took up part of a single floor and quadrupled calling capacity.

The 408 area code was the last area code in the United States to institute the requirement of dialing "1" before making a long-distance call.

== Mobile service ==
Before the existence of cell phones, Improved Mobile Telephone Service (IMTS) was offered. As of 1983, three VHF and two UHF channels were available. Subscribers had either a VHF or UHF vehicle-mounted phone, consequently they could access only two or three channels over the entire San Jose area. On VHF, the maximum system capacity for the San Jose system was three simultaneous calls. There was a roaming feature, but no registration scheme like the ones used by modern PCS and cell phones.

== Service area ==
Alum Rock, Bell Station, Buena Vista, Burbank, Campbell, Casa Loma, Loma Chiquita, Chemeketa Park, Cupertino, East Foothills, Fruitdale, Glenwood, Gilroy, Holy City, Laurel, Lexington Hills, Los Gatos, Milpitas, Monte Sereno, Morgan Hill, a small part of Mountain View, Redwood Estates, Rucker, San Antonio Valley, San Jose, San Martin, Santa Clara, Saratoga, Sargent, Seven Trees, Sunnyvale (except the westernmost edge), Sunol-Midtown, Sveadal, Zayante

== See also ==
- List of California area codes
- List of North American Numbering Plan area codes

California area codes: 209/350, 213/323, 310/424, 408/669, 415/628, 510/341, 530, 559, 562, 619/858, 626, 650, 661, 707/369, 714/657, 760/442, 805/820, 818/747, 831, 909/840, 916/279, 925, 949, 951
	North: 510/341, 925	
West: 650	408/669	East: 209/350
	South: 831	
