= Area code 661 =

Area code in central and southern California, United States

Coordinates: 35°N 118.7°W

Numbering plan areas in California (blue) and border states. Area code 661 is shown in red.

Area code 661 is a telephone area code in the North American Numbering Plan (NANP) in the U.S. state of California. The numbering plan area comprises the southern part of the San Joaquin Valley and the far northern part of the Los Angeles metropolitan area. The largest cities in the area are Bakersfield, Santa Clarita, Palmdale, and Lancaster.

The area code was created in an area code split of numbering plan area 805 on February 13, 1999, in which the eastern part of 805 was renumbered with the new area code.

== Service area ==
The numbering plan area includes most of Kern County, most of northern Los Angeles County (specifically the Santa Clarita Valley, the Antelope Valley and the surrounding mountains), and small parts of Ventura County, Santa Barbara County, and Tulare County. Principal cities in the numbering plan area are Bakersfield, Lancaster, Palmdale, and Santa Clarita.

=== Kern County ===
- Arvin
- Bakersfield
- Bear Valley Springs
- Buttonwillow
- Caliente
- Delano
- Edwards Air Force Base
- Famoso
- Fellows
- Frazier Park
- Golden Hills
- Grapevine
- Havilah
- Keene
- Lake of the Woods
- Lamont
- Lebec
- Lost Hills
- Maricopa
- McFarland
- McKittrick
- Mettler
- Mojave
- North Edwards
- Oildale
- Pine Mountain Club
- Rosamond
- Rosedale
- Shafter
- South Taft
- Stallion Springs
- Taft
- Taft Heights
- Tehachapi
- Tupman
- Valley Acres
- Walker Basin
- Wasco
- Weedpatch
- Wheeler Ridge

=== Los Angeles County ===
- Acton
- Agua Dulce
- Antelope Acres
- Castaic
- Del Sur
- Desert View Highlands
- Gorman
- Green Valley
- Juniper Hills
- Lake Hughes
- Lake Los Angeles
- Lancaster
- Leona Valley
- Littlerock
- Llano
- Neenach
- Palmdale
- Pearblossom
- Quartz Hill
- Santa Clarita
- Stevenson Ranch
- Valencia
- Val Verde
- Valyermo

=== Santa Barbara County ===
- Cuyama
- New Cuyama

=== Tulare County ===
- Allensworth
- Earlimart
- Posey

== See also ==
- List of California area codes
- List of North American Numbering Plan area codes

California area codes: 209/350, 213/323, 310/424, 408/669, 415/628, 510/341, 530, 559, 562, 619/858, 626, 650, 661, 707/369, 714/657, 760/442, 805/820, 818/747, 831, 909/840, 916/279, 925, 949, 951
	North: 559	
West: 805/820	661	East: 442/760
	South: 805/820, 747/818, 626	
