= Area codes 818 and 747 =

Telephone area codes in Los Angeles County, California, U.S.

Coordinates: 34.2334°N 118.4093°W

Numbering plan areas in California (blue) and border states. Area codes 747 and 818 are shown in red.

Area codes 818 and 747 are telephone area codes in the North American Numbering Plan (NANP) for the San Fernando Valley region of Los Angeles County in the U.S. state of California.

Area code 818 was created in a split from area code 213 on January 7, 1984. On June 14, 1997, 818 was reduced in size to create a separate numbering plan area (NPA) for most of the San Gabriel Valley with area code 626. On May 18, 2009, area code 818 was overlaid with area code 747.

== History ==
After the introduction of American telephone area codes in 1947, almost all of Los Angeles County used area code 213. During the 1980s and 1990s, the population and the demand for telecommunication services grew substantially in the Los Angeles metropolitan area, so that area code 213 came under resource pressure. In relief the numbering plan area was divided with several new area codes, including area code 818 and area code 310. Area code 818 entered service on January 7, 1984, making Los Angeles one of the first major cities to be split into multiple numbering plan areas. Area code 626 was assigned to a portion of the eastern part on June 14, 1997.

In November 1999, telephone administrations proposed an additional area code "at some future date". NPA 747 would be would split from 818, for the southern and western portions of the San Fernando Valley. This proposal sat dormant until 2007, when the telephone industry and the California Public Utilities Commission commenced resource utilization studies for relief action. Public sentiment indicated a preference for overlay action rather than a split, since 818 customers would retain the area code. Only new service would require the new area code.

On April 24, 2008, the CPUC decided that area code 747 would overlay area code 818 effective May 18, 2009. From that date, new numbers could be assigned to the new area code. All calls within the numbering plan area now required ten-digit dialing. A permissive dialing period started October 11, 2008 during which seven-digit dialing was still possible. As of mid-April 2009, calls must be dialed with the area code and number.

The first telephone number block was assigned to area code 747 on October 11, 2009.

== Service area ==
The numbering plan area is home to the following cities:

=== Neighborhoods/districts in Los Angeles City ===
- Arleta
- Canoga Park
- Chatsworth
- Encino
- Granada Hills
- Lake View Terrace
- Lake Balboa
- Mission Hills
- North Hills
- North Hollywood
- Northridge
- Pacoima
- Panorama City
- Porter Ranch
- Reseda
- Shadow Hills
- Sherman Oaks
- Studio City
- Sunland
- Sun Valley
- Sylmar
- Tarzana
- Toluca Lake
- Tujunga
- Valley Village
- Van Nuys
- West Hills
- Winnetka
- Woodland Hills

=== Los Angeles County ===
- Agoura Hills
- Burbank
- Calabasas
- Glendale
- Hidden Hills
- La Cañada Flintridge
- La Crescenta-Montrose
- Malibu Lake
- Monte Nido
- San Fernando
- Topanga (mostly in the 310 area code)
- Universal City
- Westlake Village

=== Ventura County ===
- Bell Canyon
- North Ranch (part of Thousand Oaks/Westlake Village)
- Oak Park

== In popular culture ==
In the movie Pulp Fiction, after Vincent accidentally shoots an associate in the face, Jules calls his friend Jimmy, who lives in Toluca Lake, hoping to find a place to hide their blood-soaked automobile, telling Vincent he hopes Jimmy is home "cause I ain't got no other partners in 818".

In the movie Go, Ronna tells Claire "Don't get 818 on me" when Claire acts reluctant to do some illegal/dangerous activities.

In the movie Swingers, after Mike gets a girl's number at a bar, a friend asks "818?" in reference to the girl's area code, to which Mike responds "310", an answer that impresses the rest of his friends.

In the Jennifer Lopez song "Louboutins" Lopez sings "No more 818" while singing about a part-time lover who presumably lives in the area.

In the 2006 film RV, the titular vehicle has an advertisement with a phone number containing the "818" area code.

== See also ==
- List of California area codes
- List of North American Numbering Plan area codes

California area codes: 209/350, 213/323, 310/424, 408/669, 415/628, 510/341, 530, 559, 562, 619/858, 626, 650, 661, 707/369, 714/657, 760/442, 805/820, 818/747, 831, 909/840, 916/279, 925, 949, 951
	North: 661	
West: 805/820	818/747	East: 626
	South: 310/424, 213/323	
