= Area codes 909 and 840 =

Area codes in southern California, United States

Coordinates: 34.1°N 117.5°W

Numbering plan areas in California (blue) and border states. Area codes 840 and 909 are shown in red.

Area codes 909 and 840 are telephone area codes in the North American Numbering Plan for the far-eastern part of Los Angeles County, southwestern San Bernardino County, and a small portion of Riverside County in the U.S. state of California. Area code 909 was created on November 14, 1992, in an area code split of 714 and 840 was added to the numbering plan area to form an overlay complex, effective February 23, 2021. While most of western Riverside County today uses Area code 951, some residents in Eastvale and Corona were allowed to keep the 909 area code after the split in 2004.

== History ==
In 1947, when the American Telephone and Telegraph Company (AT&T) devised the first nationwide telephone numbering plan and assigned the original North American area codes, the state of California was divided into three numbering plan areas: 213, 415, and 916, for the southern, central, and northern parts of the state, respectively. The area served by 213 extended from Mexican border to the Central Coast. Starting in the 1950s, Southern California experienced rapid expansion of telephone service, requiring area code 213 to be split five times by 1998. The first split became necessary in 1951, when most of the southern and eastern portion, including San Diego and most of Orange County, was assigned area code 714.

On November 14, 1992, the numbering plan area 714 in southern California was divided in an area code split to form an additional numbering plan area, assigned the area code 909. After an initial permissive dialing period, dialing of the area code became mandatory in August 1993.

On August 26, 1999, the NANPA approved a request by the California Public Utilities Commission for a two-phase split/overlay plan to provide area code relief for 909. In the initial phase, nearly all of western Riverside County was to be split off from 909 into area code 951 on September 9, 2000. Meanwhile, preparation for phase two was to have begun on February 12, 2000, with 1+10-digit permissive dialing being introduced for the remainder of 909 in advance of a new 752 overlay NPA with an in-service date set for February 10, 2001. Because of the nationwide outcry and protests at the time regarding the large number of area code splits as well as outrage over the requirement of 10-digit dialing in regions now served by recently introduced overlay area codes, the CPUC decided they would mitigate consumers' complaints by implementing a series of two-phase "split/overlay" relief actions so that an "equal amount of inconvenience" would be experienced by each group: those who were losing their area code would get to keep seven-digit dialing for calls within their new area code, while the rest got to keep their original area code but would be required to dial 1+10 digits for all calls, be they local or long distance. However, with the implementation of 1,000-block number pooling, both portions of the 909 split/overlay were cancelled before either phase could be implemented. (Similar plans were being considered to provide relief to the 310, 415, 510, 760 and 818 area codes as well; however, due to number rationing, all were postponed indefinitely and later permanently cancelled.)

Nevertheless, even with numbering conservation measures in place, the NANPA determined in 2003 that 909 would indeed require relief. As had been originally planned in September of 2000, western Riverside County was split off from 909 and assigned area code 951 on July 17, 2004. 909 continued to serve small portions of Corona, Riverside, Moreno Valley, and the entire city of Calimesa, all of which are in Riverside County, as well as small portions of eastern Los Angeles and northern Orange Counties; area code 752 was returned to the numbering pool to be reassigned at a later date.

On July 23, 2019, the California Public Utilities Commission approved an all-services overlay for area code 909 with the new area code 840, effective February 23, 2021. A permissive dialing period was implemented from July 2020 to January 2021. While 840 numbers are issued to new subscribers, those with 909 numbers retain them.

== Service area ==
=== Los Angeles County ===
- Claremont
- Diamond Bar
- Glendora (mostly in the 626 area code)
- City of Industry (mostly in the 626 area code and small portion in the 562 area code)
- La Verne
- Pomona
- Rowland Heights (also in the 626 area code and small portion in the 562 area code)
- San Dimas
- Walnut (small portion in the 626 area code)
- West Covina (mostly in the 626 area code)

=== Riverside County ===
- Calimesa
- Corona (mostly in the 951 area code)
- Eastvale (mostly in the 951 area code)

=== San Bernardino County ===
- Big Bear City
- Big Bear Lake
- Bloomington
- Blue Jay
- Chino Hills (small portion in the 657/714 area code)
- Chino
- Colton (small portion in the 951 area code)
- Crestline
- Fontana
- Grand Terrace (small portion in the 951 area code)
- Highland
- Lake Arrowhead
- Loma Linda
- Lytle Creek
- Mentone
- Montclair
- Muscoy
- Ontario
- Rancho Cucamonga
- Redlands
- Rialto
- Running Springs
- San Antonio Heights
- San Bernardino
- Sugarloaf
- Upland
- Yucaipa

== See also ==
- List of California area codes
- List of North American Numbering Plan area codes

California area codes: 209/350, 213/323, 310/424, 408/669, 415/628, 510/341, 530, 559, 562, 619/858, 626, 650, 661, 707/369, 714/657, 760/442, 805/820, 818/747, 831, 909/840, 916/279, 925, 949, 951
	North: 760/442	
West: 626	840/909	East: 760/442
	South: 951, 714/657	
