= Area codes 619 and 858 =

Area codes for San Diego County, California

Coordinates: 32.6°N 117°W

Numbering plan areas in California (blue) and border states. Area code 619 is shown in red.

Area codes 619 and 858 are telephone area codes in the North American Numbering Plan (NANP) for most of San Diego County in the U.S. state of California. Area code 619 was created by a split of area code 714 in 1982. In 1999, a part of the 619 numbering plan area was assigned area code 858 in northwest San Diego County. In 2019, the area code boundary between 619 and 858 was eliminated, creating an overlay complex with the two area codes.

== History ==
When the American Telephone and Telegraph Company (AT&T) devised the first nationwide telephone numbering plan for Operator Toll Dialing in 1947, California was divided into three numbering plan areas, which were reorganized geographically in 1950. The first area code split became necessary in 1951, when most of the southern and eastern portion, including San Diego and most of Orange County, was assigned area code 714. In 1982, 714 was split and almost all of the southernmost portion of California, from San Diego to the Nevada border received area code 619, the first new area code in California since 1959, when 707 was added.

On March 23, 1997, most of outer northern San Diego County, desert areas and geographical areas in southeastern California were removed from the numbering plan area by a split for area code 760.

On June 30, 1998, the NANPA approved a request by the California Public Utilities Commission for a two-phase three-way split of 619 such that the first phase would introduce the new 858 area code to northwest San Diego County on June 12, 1999, after which the southern and eastern parts of the county would be split off into a new 935 area code on June 10, 2000, leaving the remaining portion of 619 to serve almost exclusively the city of San Diego. However, after the 858 phase of the split, popular and political opposition throughout the country regarding the large number of area code splits being scheduled forced the NANPA to implement 1000-block number pooling, which effectively extended the life of the remaining portion of 619, and the 935 phase of the split was cancelled.

In response to projections that 619 would exhaust its central office prefixes in March 2019, the California Public Utilities Commission approved a relief plan that eliminated the 619/858 boundary, turning 619 and 858 into overlay area codes for all of the inner portion of San Diego County. This change took effect in June 2018; at that time, ten-digit local calling became mandatory. At the time, 858 was not projected to be exhausted for at least thirty years, despite North County's continued growth. Under the most recent projections, San Diego will not need relief until 2043.

== Service area ==
The service area includes the following cities and communities:

- 4S Ranch
- Alpine
- Bonita
- Bostonia
- Boulevard
- Campo
- Carmel Mountain Ranch^{*}
- Carmel Valley^{*}
- Casa de Oro-Mount Helix
- Chula Vista^{†}
- Clairemont^{*}
- Coronado^{†}
- Crest
- Del Mar^{†}
- Descanso
- Dulzura
- El Cajon^{†}
- Granite Hills
- Harbison Canyon
- Imperial Beach^{†}
- Jacumba
- Jamul
- Kearny Mesa^{*}
- La Jolla^{*}
- La Mesa^{†}
- La Presa
- Lakeside
- Lemon Grove^{†}
- Lincoln Acres
- Linda Vista^{*}
- Miramar^{*}
- Mira Mesa^{*}
- Mission Beach^{*}
- Mount Laguna
- National City^{†}
- Ocean Beach^{*}
- Pacific Beach^{*}
- Pine Valley
- Potrero
- Poway^{†}
- Rancho Bernardo^{*}
- Rancho Peñasquitos^{*}
- Rancho San Diego
- Rancho Santa Fe
- Sabre Springs^{*}
- San Diego^{†}
- Santee^{†}
- San Ysidro^{*}
- Scripps Ranch^{*}
- Serra Mesa^{*}
- Solana Beach^{†}
- Sorrento Valley^{*}
- Spring Valley
- Tecate
- Tierrasanta^{*}
- University City^{*}
- Winter Gardens

^{*} Communities that are mostly or entirely within San Diego

^{†} Incorporated cities within San Diego County

== In popular culture ==
Professional wrestler and San Diego native Rey Mysterio named his finishing move "The 619" after the area code. A DVD featuring him is titled Rey Mysterio: 619. His entrance theme is called "Booyaka 619" and is performed by fellow San Diego natives P.O.D.

Football player Reggie Bush explained why he painted the number 619 into his eyeblack during games: "When I do that, it's my way of keeping myself humble, of representing my hometown and letting them know I'm not going to forget where I came from."

== See also ==
- List of California area codes
- List of North American Numbering Plan area codes

California area codes: 209/350, 213/323, 310/424, 408/669, 415/628, 510/341, 530, 559, 562, 619/858, 626, 650, 661, 707/369, 714/657, 760/442, 805/820, 818/747, 831, 909/840, 916/279, 925, 949, 951
	North: 442/760	
West: Pacific Ocean, 808	619/858	East: 442/760
	South: Country code 52 in Mexico	
Hawaii area codes: 808
