= Area codes 310 and 424 =

Area codes in the Los Angeles metropolitan area

Coordinates: 34.0383°N 118.5108°W

Numbering plan areas in California (blue) and border states. Area codes 310 and 424 are shown in red.

Area codes 310 and 424 are telephone area codes in the North American Numbering Plan (NANP) for the U.S. state of California. The numbering plan area includes the West Los Angeles and South Bay areas of Los Angeles County, a small portion of Ventura County, and Santa Catalina Island, which is located 26 miles (42 km) south.

Area code 310 was created in a split from area code 213 on November 2, 1991. On January 25, 1997, area code 310 was split, creating area code 562 for the southeast portion of Los Angeles County and a large portion of Orange County. Area code 424 was added to the remaining numbering plan area on July 26, 2006, in an overlay plan, the first in California.

== Splits and overlay controversy ==
Area code 562 was originally intended as an overlay code for cellular and pager services for the existing 310 area. The overlay was planned for late 1995, and was expected to extend over the 213 and 818 areas the following year. However, the plan was changed to a split of 310, when the California Public Utilities Commission decided that an overlay would have disadvantaged subscribers of smaller companies in requiring ten-digit dialing.

The south and east portions of 310, roughly the Gateway Cities area of Los Angeles County from Long Beach to Whittier and parts of Orange County became area code 562 on January 25, 1997.

In lieu of executing an additional split, a new area code, 424, was implemented in the entire 310 region, first announced in early 1999. Previously, several proposals intended to split 310 at Imperial Highway, a major east–west thoroughfare that marks the southern boundary of Los Angeles International Airport. The South Bay below the boundary would have received area code 424. South Bay governments and businesses opposed such a move, since it would require costly changes to business cards, stationery, signage, and other business communications, just eight years after the previous change of area code for that area.

Announcement of the 424 overlay created an uproar in Los Angeles's politically powerful Westside community, in part because the change would necessitate dialing ten digits even when calling local numbers. Championed by Los Angeles Times columnist Robert Scheer in the paper's Santa Monica insert section, a protest movement arose in May 1999, focusing on the idea of telephone-number conservation. In a carry-over from the time of analog telephone systems, numbers were still assigned to telephone companies in blocks of 10,000, leading to a large portion of unused telephone numbers in each area code. Responding to the controversy, the California State Assembly passed the Consumer Area Code Relief Act of 1999 on September 9, 1999, and the 424 overlay was tabled.

Having been staved off nearly seven years, the overlay with 424 was finally implemented on July 26, 2006. On December 31, 2005, customers began dialing 1 + area code + seven-digit number whenever a call is placed by a caller in the 310 or 424 area code to any other area code, including 310 to 424 or 424 to 310. After July 26, 2006, customers were required to use the new 1 + area code + seven-digit number dialing procedure for all calls, although dialing 1 first on local calls is not required.

== Service area ==
=== Los Angeles County ===
- Alondra Park
- Athens
- Avalon
- Beverly Hills (small portion in the 323 area code)
- Carson
- Compton
- Culver City
- Del Aire
- East Compton
- El Segundo
- Gardena
- Hawthorne (small portion in the 323 area code)
- Hermosa Beach
- Inglewood (small portion in the 323 area code)
- Lynwood
- Ladera Heights (also in the 323 area code)
- Lawndale
- Lennox
- Lomita
- Los Angeles
  - Bel Air
  - Brentwood
  - Harbor City
  - Harbor Gateway (small portion in the 323 area code)
  - Pacific Palisades
  - Playa del Rey
  - Playa Vista
  - San Pedro
  - Venice
  - West Los Angeles
  - Westchester
  - Westwood
  - Wilmington
- Lynwood (small portion in the 323 area code)
- Malibu
- Manhattan Beach
- Marina del Rey
- Palos Verdes Estates
- Rancho Palos Verdes
- Redondo Beach
- Rolling Hills Estates
- Rolling Hills
- Santa Monica
- South Gate (mostly in the 323 area code and small portion in the 562 area code)
- Topanga (small portion in the 818 area code)
- Torrance
- West Athens (mostly in the 323 area code)
- West Carson
- West Compton
- West Hollywood (also in the 323 area code)
- Willowbrook (also in the 323 area code)

== See also ==
- List of California area codes
- List of North American Numbering Plan area codes

California area codes: 209/350, 213/323, 310/424, 408/669, 415/628, 510/341, 530, 559, 562, 619/858, 626, 650, 661, 707/369, 714/657, 760/442, 805/820, 818/747, 831, 909/840, 916/279, 925, 949, 951
| | North: 805/820, 818/747 | |
| West: Pacific Ocean, 808 | 310/424 includes islands offshore | East: 213/323, 562 |
| | South: Pacific Ocean | |
Hawaii area codes: 808
