= Area codes 916 and 279 =

Area codes in California

Coordinates: 38.6°N 121.5°W

Numbering plan areas in California (blue) and border states. Area code 916 is shown in red.

Area codes 916 and 279 are telephone area codes in the North American Numbering Plan for Sacramento, the state capital of the U.S. state of California, and parts of five surrounding counties.

Area code 916 was one of the first three area codes established in California in October 1947, originally assigned to the most northern part, but remapped in 1950 to the northeast. Area code splits have reduced the numbering plan area to the greater Sacramento area.

Area code 279 began service in March 2018 in an overlay to relieve an exhausting supply of central office codes in 916.

== History ==
Originally, in 1947, the numbering plan area comprised the far northern portion of the state. In 1950, as part of a realignment of California's area codes, 916 was redrawn to cover the northeastern corner of California, from the Sierra Nevada to the Central Valley. This involved changing Sacramento from area code 415 to 916.

In 1958, 916 was reduced in geographic extent with the creation of the new area code 209 for the southern part including Fresno, Stockton and Modesto.

On November 1, 1997, the numbering plan area was reduced to Sacramento and its immediate area in a split in which the northeastern portion, including Redding, Yreka, Davis, and Mount Shasta, received area code 530. Simultaneously, Dixon was reassigned from 916 to 707. This split left 916 as the only one of the original 86 area codes that no longer contains any part of its original area.

In 2017, the CPUC approved an overlay area code to take effect in 2018, as all available prefixes were expected to be allocated by December 2018. On February 9, 2017, the CPUC announced that the new overlay area code would be area code 279. The new area code began service on March 10, 2018.

== Service area ==
The numbering plan area encompasses Sacramento and its surrounding suburbs:

=== El Dorado County ===
- El Dorado Hills

=== Placer County ===
- Granite Bay
- Lincoln
- Loomis
- Newcastle
- Penryn
- Rocklin
- Roseville

=== Sacramento County ===
- Antelope
- Arden-Arcade
- Carmichael
- Citrus Heights
- Elk Grove
- Fair Oaks
- Florin
- Folsom
- Foothill Farms
- Gold River
- Isleton
- La Riviera
- Locke
- McClellan Park
- North Highlands
- Orangevale
- Parkway-South Sacramento
- Rancho Cordova
- Rancho Murieta
- Rio Linda
- Rosemont
- Sacramento
- Vineyard
- Walnut Grove
- Wilton

=== Sutter County ===
- Pleasant Grove

=== Yolo County ===
- Clarksburg
- West Sacramento

== See also ==
- List of California area codes
- List of North American Numbering Plan area codes

California area codes: 209/350, 213/323, 310/424, 408/669, 415/628, 510/341, 530, 559, 562, 619/858, 626, 650, 661, 707/369, 714/657, 760/442, 805/820, 818/747, 831, 909/840, 916/279, 925, 949, 951
| | North: 530 | |
| West: 530, 707/369 | 279/916 | East: 530 |
| | South: 209/350, 925 | |
