= Area codes 213, 323, and 738 =

Area codes in the Los Angeles metropolitan area

Coordinates: 34.0552°N 118.2568°W

Numbering plan areas in California (blue) and border states.

Area codes 213, 323, and 738 are telephone area codes in the North American Numbering Plan (NANP) for the U.S. state of California. They are assigned in an overlay complex to a numbering plan area (NPA) that comprises, roughly, the area of downtown Los Angeles City, as well as several southeast Los Angeles County cities, such as Bell and Huntington Park. Area code 213 was one of the original North American area codes of 1947 and 323 was created in an area code split of 213 in 1998. This was the fifth split of 213 and left it serving only downtown Los Angeles and immediately adjoining neighborhoods. In 2017, the two NPAs were recombined in the overlay.

Area code 738 was selected as an additional overlay area code, activated in November 2024.

== History ==
In 1947, when the American Telephone and Telegraph Company (AT&T) devised the first nationwide telephone numbering plan and assigned the original North American area codes, the state of California was divided into three numbering plan areas: 213, 415, and 916, for the southern, central, and northern parts of the state, respectively. The area served by 213 extended from the Mexican border to the Central Coast. In 1950, the boundary between 213 and 415 was realigned toward the north, requiring the southern portion of the Central Valley, including Bakersfield, to change from area code 415 to 213.

As a result of southern California's rapid expansion of telephone service during the second half of the 20th century, area code 213 was split five times in the period from 1951 to 1998. In the 21st century area code overlays have become more practical.

=== 1951–1998: Area code splits ===
The first split became necessary in 1951, when most of the southern and eastern portion, including San Diego and most of Orange County, were assigned area code 714. In 1957, 213 was restricted to Los Angeles County, with most of the northern and western portions receiving area code 805. This configuration was stable for almost three decades, until 1984, when the San Fernando Valley and the San Gabriel Valley received area code 818, thus making Los Angeles one of the first major cities in the US to be split into two numbering plan areas—New York City experienced this later in the same year. In 1991, West Los Angeles and the South Bay were assigned area code 310.

On June 13, 1998, the Los Angeles NPA was divided once more, to create area code 323. Area code 213 was kept by Los Angeles exchanges 1 (Downtown/Echo Park), 7 (South Park/Exposition Park) and 10 (Westlake/Koreatown), while exchanges 2 (Silverlake/Los Feliz), 3 (Eagle Rock/Highland Park), 4 (El Sereno/Lincoln Heights), 5 (Boyle Heights/East Los Angeles), 6 (Bell/Vernon/South Gate), 8 (South Central/South LA), 9 (South LA/Hyde Park/Athens), 11 (West Adams/Jefferson Park), 12 (Leimert Park/Baldwin Hills), 13 (Hancock Park/Fairfax District) and 14 (Hollywood/Hollywood Hills) switched to area code 323. This split made 213 one of the geographically smallest numbering plan areas in the nation, covering only Downtown Los Angeles and its immediately adjoining neighborhoods, such as Chinatown. Completely surrounding 213, 323 included most of the remainder of central Los Angeles, including Hollywood, as well as several neighboring cities, including Bell, Huntington Park and Montebello.

=== Since 2017: Overlays ===
Despite Southern California's continued growth and the proliferation of cell phones and pagers, 213 was not projected to exhaust until 2050. In contrast, 323 was projected to exhaust in 2017. Since 213 still had an abundance of numbers available, the California Public Utilities Commission approved a plan that erased the boundaries between both area codes, converting the area to an overlay complex for all of central Los Angeles. Since this change went into full effect on July 8, 2017, telephone companies have been able to assign any available 213 numbers in the former 323 area and vice versa, and customers have been required to dial the area code for all calls. This change returned 213 to some areas that had used it for more than half a century prior to 1998. Even so, within five years of the boundary elimination, it was determined that further relief would be required for 213/323.

Based on exhaustion studies of the numbering plan area, the California Public Utilities Commission approved an additional all-services overlay code on March 16, 2023, by selecting area code 738 with an in-service date of November 1, 2024.

== Service area ==
Cities and communities in the overlay complex include:

- Alhambra (mostly served by area code 626)
- Bell
- Bell Gardens (also served by area code 562)
- Beverly Hills (mostly served by area code 310)
- City Terrace
- Commerce (small portion in area code 562)
- Cudahy
- East Los Angeles
- Florence
- Florence-Graham
- Hawthorne (mostly served by area code 310)
- Huntington Park
- Inglewood (mostly served by area code 310)
- Ladera Heights (also served by area code 310)
- Los Angeles, including the downtown area.
- Lynwood (mostly served by area code 310)
- Maywood
- Montebello
- Monterey Park (also served by area code 626)
- Pasadena (mostly served by area code 626)
- Rosemead (mostly served by area code 626)
- South Gate (small portions served by area codes 562 and 310)
- South Pasadena (also served by area code 626)
- Vernon
- View Park Windsor Hills
- Walnut Park
- West Athens (small portion served by area code 310)
- West Hollywood (also served by area code 310)
- Westmont

== See also ==
- List of California area codes
- List of North American Numbering Plan area codes

California area codes: 209/350, 213/323, 310/424, 408/669, 415/628, 510/341, 530, 559, 562, 619/858, 626, 650, 661, 707/369, 714/657, 760/442, 805/820, 818/747, 831, 909/840, 916/279, 925, 949, 951
	North: 818/747, 626	
West: 310/424	213/323/738	East: 626
	South: 310/424, 562	
