= Area codes 714 and 657 =

Area codes in southern California

Coordinates: 33.8°N 117.9°W

Numbering plan areas in California (blue) and border states. Area codes 657 and 714 are shown in red.

Area codes 714 and 657 are telephone area codes in the North American Numbering Plan (NANP) for the southern part of the U.S. state of California. The numbering plan area comprises northern Orange County, a portion of Los Angeles County, and the Sleepy Hollow and Carbon Canyon areas of Chino Hills in San Bernardino County. Area code 714 was assigned to a part of numbering plan area 213 in 1951, and 657 was added in 2008 to form an overlay complex.

== History ==
In 1947, when the American Telephone and Telegraph Company (AT&T) devised the first nationwide telephone numbering plan and assigned the original North American area codes, the state of California was divided into three numbering plan areas: 213, 415, and 916, for the southern, central, and northern parts of the state, respectively. The area served by 213 extended from Mexican border to the Central Coast. Starting in the 1950s, Southern California experienced rapid expansion of telephone service, requiring area code 213 to be split five times by 1998. The first division came in 1951 in a rearrangement of anticipated numbering plan areas to prepare for Operator Toll Dialing and, eventually, direct distance dialing (DDD). In this rearrangement, most of the southern and eastern portion, including San Diego and most of Orange County, was assigned area code 714. This included most of Southern California, generally south and east of Los Angeles, extending to the Arizona and Nevada state lines to the east, and south as far as the Mexican border (what is now area codes 442/760, 619, 858, 909, and 951). Despite Southern California's growth in the second half of the 20th century, this configuration remained in place for 31 years.

On January 1, 1982, most of the southern and eastern portion, centered around San Diego and the desert areas, became area code 619. In 1992, eastern Los Angeles and the Inland Empire became area code 909. On April 18, 1998, the southern cities of Orange County were split from 714, creating area code 949.

By 2007, 714 was running out of telephone numbers due to Southern California's continued growth and the proliferation of mobile telephones. As a solution, area code 657 was overlaid onto the 714 territory on September 23, 2008.

== Service area ==
The service area includes northern and western Orange County, except for portions of La Habra and all of Seal Beach, Los Alamitos, the far northwestern portion of Brea, and the western portions of La Palma, which have always been in the same area code as Long Beach—currently the 562 area code. This is probably because at the time those splits first occurred, while most cities in Southern California were provided primary local telephone service from what was then Pacific Bell (now AT&T), the cities listed above were served by GTE, the primary telephone provider for Long Beach (this territory has since become part of Verizon, and now Frontier Communications).

Today, five cities "straddle" the 657/714 and 949 area codes: Costa Mesa, Irvine, Santa Ana, Tustin, and Newport Beach.

Cities in the numbering plan area include Tustin, Placentia, Anaheim, Buena Park, Costa Mesa (unique because it is split between the 714/657 and 949 area codes, at Wilson Street and along Newport Boulevard), Cypress, Fountain Valley, Fullerton, Orange, Garden Grove, Santa Ana, Villa Park, Yorba Linda, portions of La Habra, and most of Brea and Huntington Beach.

=== Los Angeles County ===
- Cerritos (mostly in the 562 area code)
- La Mirada (mostly in the 562 area code)

=== Orange County ===
- Anaheim
- Brea (small portion in the 562 area code)
- Buena Park
- Costa Mesa (small portion in the 949 area code)
- Cypress (small portion in the 562 area code)
- Fountain Valley
- Fullerton (small portion in the 562 area code)
- Garden Grove
- Huntington Beach (small portion in the 562 area code)
- Irvine (mostly in the 949 area code)
- La Habra (mostly in the 562 area code)
- La Palma (small portion in the 562 area code)
- Los Alamitos (mostly in the 562 area code)
- Midway City
- Modjeska Canyon
- Newport Beach (mostly in the 949 area code)
- North Tustin
- Orange Park Acres
- Orange
- Placentia
- Santa Ana (small portion in the 949 area code)
- Santiago Canyon
- Seal Beach (mostly in the 562 area code)
- Silverado
- Stanton
- Tustin Foothills
- Tustin (small portion in the 949 area code)
- Villa Park
- Westminster
- Yorba Linda

=== San Bernardino County ===
- Chino Hills (mostly in the 909 area code)

== See also ==
- List of California area codes
- List of North American Numbering Plan area codes

California area codes: 209/350, 213/323, 310/424, 408/669, 415/628, 510/341, 530, 559, 562, 619/858, 626, 650, 661, 707/369, 714/657, 760/442, 805/820, 818/747, 831, 909/840, 916/279, 925, 949, 951
	North: 626, 909/840	
West: 310/424 (offshore islands), 562	657/714	East: 951
	South: 949, Pacific Ocean	
