= Overlay complex =

American telephone numbering plan

In telecommunications, an area code overlay complex is a telephone numbering plan that assigns multiple area codes to the same geographic numbering plan area (NPA). Area code overlays are implemented in territories of the North American Numbering Plan (NANP) to mitigate exhaustion of central office codes in growth areas. The method has been in use since 1992, and has been the exclusive method of area code relief since 2007.

== History ==
From the 1947 inception of the North American Numbering Plan in to 1992, the only method of introducing new area codes was the area code split. It divided an existing numbering plan area (NPA) into multiple regions, one of which retained the existing area code. The other parts were each assigned a new NPA code.

The retaining area was usually the historically more established or developed place, and required no numbering changes (one exception was area code 606 in eastern Kentucky; the populous areas of Lexington and the Cincinnati suburbs in northern Kentucky received the new area code 859, with other locations, including the Eastern Kentucky Coalfield, retaining 606). It gained numbering capacity by acquiring the central office codes of the other areas, because those were delegated to a new area code in the process. The existing central office codes in the separated areas are maintained in the new numbering plan area and so that the change for existing subscribers is the change of area code. Thus, only area code references, where present for long-distance calling, required updating in directories, letterheads, and business cards. Local seven-digit dialing was unaffected by the area code change.

With the proliferation of electronic switching systems starting in the 1980s, it became possible to implement another method for expanding numbering plan resources, the area code overlay. In an overlay numbering plan, also called overlay complex, an additional area code is assigned to an existing numbering plan area, thereby avoiding the need for existing customers in the reassigned regions to change telephone numbers. The first use of that solution was in New York City in 1992, when area code 917 was overlaid to two numbering plan areas: area code 212 in Manhattan and area code 718 in the outer boroughs.

== Types ==
The North American Numbering Plan Administrator recognizes several types of overlays:

In a distributed overlay, or all-services overlay, the most common type, an entire existing numbering plan area (NPA) gains another area code serving the entire area.

In a single concentrated overlay, only the high-growth portion of an existing area gains a second area code. This was previously implemented in several numbering plan areas, but all of them have since been expanded to the entire NPA.

In a multiple concentrated overlay, the entire existing numbering plan area gains multiple additional area codes, each of which serves a different subsection of the original. This has never been implemented.

In a multiple-area distributed overlay, two or more numbering plan areas gain a single new area code covering the entire area, either concurrently or in phases. Examples include 872 in Chicago, Illinois (over 312 and 773) as well as 587 and 825 in Alberta (over 403 and 780). In a phased example, area code 564 was implemented initially only on area code 360 in 2017, but will expand to three other codes when needed, in western Washington.

A boundary-extension overlay is a type in which one or more neighboring numbering plan areas is expanded. Examples include 321 over 407 in central Florida and 778 over 250 in British Columbia. In 1999, 281 was the first of this type, merging with 713 in Houston. Later that year, 972 merged with 214 in Dallas, followed by 323 merging with 213 in Los Angeles in 2017, and 858, in San Diego, with 619 a year later. In 2023, the first multiple boundary-extension overlay was implemented with the folding of area codes 602, 480, and 623 into a single overlay complex for the Phoenix metropolitan area.

Service-specific overlays are not practiced in the NANP. Only one case, the first overlay area code in the NANPA, 917, was ever an example. It was established originally as an area code specifically for cellphones and pagers in New York City, but soon afterward, the FCC specified that area codes must not be service-specific though it grandfathered the use for 917. Later, 917 became available for landline assignments in New York City.

== Methodology ==
Implementations of the overlay method requires ten-digit dialing, by including the area code, for all calling destinations, local or long-distance. The only notable, temporary, exception was the introduction of 917 overlaying all of New York City for mobile services, which initially kept seven-digit dial within 212.

=== Exceptions ===
Near numbering plan area boundaries, special situations arose at times when established communities extended on both sides of the boundary. To preserve local community integrity, identity, and convenience, a party could dial an office prefix for a local call with only seven-digits, but the destination was technically located in the adjacent number plan area. If a subscriber called a distant office prefix with the same area code, the call would require the dialing prefix 1 before the seven- or ten-digit number.

A similar practice was implemented on a large scale in the metropolitan area of Washington, DC, and its suburbs in Maryland and Virginia. Most of the Washington region's inner ring is a single local calling area, even though it is split between three area codes–the District's area code 202, Maryland's area code 301 and Northern Virginia's area code 703. For most of the second half of the 20th century, it was possible to dial any number in the metro area with just seven digits. The entire area implemented a system of central office code protection in which no central office code was duplicated in the entire area. Each existing central office code was properly routed with each area code in the region so that each telephone number in the region could be dialed with any of the regional area codes, giving the appearance of an overlay plan. One side effect of the scheme was that if a number was in use in any portion of the Washington area, the corresponding number in Maryland or Virginia could be used only in an area that was considered a safe distance from the metro area, such as Western Virginia or the Eastern Shore of Maryland. This system was ended in 1991 because of an impending number shortage on both sides of the Potomac River.

A similar method was employed in Canada's capital, Ottawa. It shared the same calling area as Hull, its twin city in Quebec, even though Ottawa was in area code 613 and Hull was in area code 819. Until 2006, it was possible to place a call between Ottawa and Hull with only seven digits. That was implemented with central office code protection so that the same seven-digit telephone number could not be duplicated anywhere in Eastern Ontario or Western Quebec, even in areas a safe distance from the Ottawa area. The scheme briefly continued after Hull was merged into the larger city of Gatineau in 2002. However, by the turn of the century, 819 was threatened with exhaustion by the increased demand for numbers brought on by the proliferation of cell phones. By then, the only available prefixes in 819 could theoretically be used in the former Hull but only by breaking seven-digit dialing between Ottawa and Hull. That was the result in 2006, when ten-digit dialing became mandatory in both NPAs. The sole legacy of the old configuration is the duplication of federal government numbers on both sides of the provincial border with differing area codes.

=== Rapid growth ===
Urban sprawl accelerated the rate of expansion of metropolitan areas, and multiple split plans have caused the geographical area of a given area code in those regions to shrink, except in countries that assign shorter area codes and longer local numbers in areas with high population densities. The rapid growth in popularity of electronic devices (pagers and then mobile phones), in addition to regular landline growth, increased demand for new phone numbers even more. Although landline growth has sharply dropped and even decreased, largely by the elimination of residential landlines in favor of personal mobile phones, it has been replaced by the even worse problem of data-only devices (hotspots, modems, netbooks, and especially popular tablets), which still require a telephone number for use on cellular networks even if they are unable to make or receive regular calls.

The rise in popularity of mobile devices has added to the pressure against split plans, as an area-code change affecting the exchange in which a cellphone is based not only forces customers to reprogram their phones but also requires the wireless carrier to reassign the number of every device based in those areas. While phones with a SIM card have their own mobile device number updated automatically, there is still the inconvenience of users having to update their contact lists for local family members or others who have had their numbers changed too.

=== Compromise ===
Most overlay plans introduced the inconvenience of mandatory ten-digit dialing in which the area code must always be included even for local calls. Ten-digit dialing is not a technically necessary requirement, and 917 was initially deployed without it, but a US Federal Communications Commission (FCC) mandate instituted it at the demand of major telephone companies, to whom an overlay is considered a disadvantage to competitors. In Canada, ten-digit dialing is also a requirement of the Canadian Radio-television and Telecommunications Commission in overlay area codes.

== Popularity ==
Overlays were initially met with resistance, as they result in multiple area codes in the same geographic area, which requires ten-digit dialing. In many cases, such as 847 in Chicago's northwestern suburbs and 212 in New York City, an overlay was an additional disruption to a community that had already been subject to one or multiple code splits, encountering pushback from state regulators or consumer groups. However, overlay plans were eventually used much more widely in some areas than others. For example, much of Ohio has large overlay complexes, as has northern Georgia and the North Carolina Piedmont. Connecticut, Illinois, Oregon, New Jersey, Massachusetts, Maryland, Pennsylvania, Texas, Virginia and, more recently, California have also implemented many overlays. No area code splits have been performed since 2007, when area code 575 split off 505 in New Mexico, and no splits are proposed.

Telecommunications companies have increasingly favored overlays even in sparsely populated rural areas in which ten-digit local numbers are unnecessary, as split plans force cellular providers to reprogram millions of client handsets. Customers also incur costs to publish new letterheads and to reprogram stored address book data on individual devices. Overlays have become more expedient as the proliferation of cell phones has accelerated area codes exhaustion. In most relief planning projects, overlays have become the sole option considered in the planning stage.

Overlays have especially been favored for numbering plan areas that had grown substantially to the point of needed further relief, after being split, as carriers want to minimize additional customer inconveniences. For example, Maryland had been served solely by area code 301 from the implementation of the area code system until 1990, when the area from Baltimore eastward was split off with area code 410. Within only five years, 410 was already threatend by central office code exhaustion from the proliferation of cell phones, pagers, fax machines, and dial-up Internet lines. The area's dominant telephone provider, Bell Atlantic (now part of Verizon) realized that a split would have forced residents of either Baltimore or the Eastern Shore to change their numbers for the second time in the 1990s. Accordingly, area code 443 was created as an overlay for all of the eastern portion of Maryland in 1996.

Overlay plans also favor incumbent wireline carriers over new entrants, as the established firm already has large allocations of numbers in the more desirable existing code, and subscribers of new or growing competing carriers are relegated to unfamiliar, new codes.

The first example of an area code overlaid on an entire U.S. jurisdiction was Puerto Rico, with area code 939 added to the numbering plan area of area code 787, in 2001. Puerto Rico had just been split from area code 809, the area code for much of the Caribbean, in 1996. A split was deemed unfeasible because of the island's extremely dense population and the lack of a suitable boundary for a split. Additionally, a split would have forced half of Puerto Ricans to change telephone numbers for the second time in a decade.

The first instance of a statewide overlay was West Virginia's area code 304, in 2009. West Virginia had been served by 304 since the inception of the North American Numbering Plan, but by 2007 the state needed a new area code. At first, state officials voted to split off northern West Virginia with area code 681 and to leave southern West Virginia with 304. However, lobbying by the telecommunications industry led to a state-wide overlay. Idaho followed that precedent in 2017 by overlaying area codes 208 and 986.

Overlays gained popularity in the Canadian telephone network in the early 2000s as a more efficient relief method. The proliferation of cellphones, fax machines, pagers, and dial-up Internet connections, particularly in larger markets, threatened central office code exhaustion in many areas. The area codes for four of the five largest Canadian markets (416 in Toronto, 514 in Montreal, 604 in Vancouver, and 403 in Calgary) had previously been split in the 1990s.

Particularly severe allocation problems manifested themselves at the turn of the century in Canada's largest local calling area, Metro Toronto and the Golden Horseshoe. This area had been served by 416 since the institution of the area code system. The Golden Horseshoe's explosive growth in the second half of the 20th century makes numbers tend to be used up fairly quickly. As a result, the number allocation problem was not as severe in 416 as it was in the rest of Canada. Nevertheless, it was severe enough to force Toronto's suburban ring into area code 905 in 1993. While the Golden Horseshoe would have likely needed another area code because of its continued growth, it is very likely that the immediate need for relief would have been staved off had it been possible to reallocate numbers from the smaller rate centers in the region to Metro Toronto. Within two years of the 905 split, 416 was back on the verge of exhaustion. American cities such as New York City, Chicago, and Los Angeles had been split between two area codes, but that solution was quickly ruled out for Metro Toronto because of the area's extremely dense population and the lack of a suitable boundary for a split. It was ultimately decided to overlay 416 with area code 647 in 2001, two years after Metro Toronto was merged into the "megacity" of Toronto.

The successful implementation of 647 triggered the rapid adoption of overlays across Canada. By 2023, seven-digit dialing had been nearly eliminated nationwide in Canada, and no numbering plan areas have been split in the country since 1999. Overlays have become the preferred method of expansion in Canada, They spare rural areas the expense and burden of changing telephone numbers. As a result, British Columbia and the Prairie Provinces have installed province-wide overlays.

== Number pool management ==
The persistent unpopularity of new area code creation by splits or overlays has contributed to a change in the rules of number block allocation to conserve the pool of available telephone numbers. The change, which allowed for the assignment of smaller number blocks, is commonly known as telephone number pooling, and has slowed the need for new area codes. For example, the western half of Washington, including Seattle, narrowly avoided the need for an overlay in 2001. Area code 564, originally planned for introduction in October 2001, was delayed indefinitely in August 2001 after state regulators determined that the use of number pooling had resulted in more efficiency in the use of telephone numbers in Western Washington. The 564 overlay complex was delayed until 2017.

Number pooling is not practiced in Canada. Every competing carrier is issued blocks of 10,000 numbers (corresponding to a single prefix) for every rate center in which it offers service, regardless of its actual subscriber count. Individual rate centers exist even in the smallest hamlets, and even tiny unincorporated villages receive multiple blocks of 10,000 numbers. Larger cities, particularly "megacities" that were created by amalgamations in the 1990s and early 2000s, have multiple rate centers which were not combined for years, if at all. For example, Ottawa, Ontario, which is Canada's capital and fourth-largest city, is split between 11 rate centers; its twin city in Quebec, Gatineau, is split between five. Mississauga, Canada's sixth-largest city, is split between five rate centers even though it has been a single municipality since 1974. Hamilton, the nation's tenth-largest city, is split between nine rate centers. Surrey, the nation's twelfth-largest city, is split between three rate centers and part of a fourth. Once a number is assigned to a rate center and carrier, it cannot be moved elsewhere even when a rate center has enough numbers to serve it. Overlays have become the preferred relief solution in Canada, partly because they are an easy workaround for the number allocation problem.

== See also ==
- List of area code overlays
- Interexchange carrier
- Telephone exchange
- Exhaust date
