= Ten-digit dialing =

Telephone dialing procedure

Ten-digit dialing is a telephone dialing procedure in the countries and territories of the North American Numbering Plan (NANP). It is the practice of including the area code of a telephone number when dialing to initiate a telephone call. When necessary, the 10-digit number may be prefixed with the trunk code 1, which is referred to as 1+10-digit dialing or national format.

== History ==
The implementation and expansion of the North American Numbering Plan between 1947 and 1992 preserved a long-standing practice in the United States and Canada that callers should only need to dial the local seven-digit telephone number when placing a call within the caller's exchange area or within the home numbering plan area (NPA). In seven-digit dialing, callers dial the three-digit central office code and the four-digit station number of the destination telephone if it resides in the same numbering plan area. Dialing of an area code before the telephone number, referred to as ten-digit dialing, was only necessary for foreign NPA (FNPA) calls.

Some communities with significant parts on both sides of an area code boundary implemented central office code protection, where possible, to ensure the same seven-digit local number was not assigned in two different area codes in the same city to assure seven-digit dialing in the entire community.

== Code exhaustion relief ==
When the demand for telecommunication services in a numbering plan area threatens to exceed the capacity of telephone numbers of a single area code, the local public service agency and the Federal Communications Commission initiate relief measures to mitigate the exhaustion, and assure continued service with minimal customer impact in the affected areas.

=== Area code split ===
In an area code split, the established practice of relief from 1947 to 1992, the affected numbering plan area is divided into suitable parts, most often two, and assigned a new area code to one of the areas, while maintaining the existing area code in the other. The area that retained the code was most commonly the denser-populated or geographically or historically more significant part. This doubled the number of central office prefixes for the combined area of both NPAs, and permitted additional prefixes, previously unassigned, in both. This practice preserved seven-digit dialing in all affected areas.

=== Area code overlay ===
By 1992, a new method of relief became available from the proliferation of electronic switching systems that were based on stored program control (SPC), which reduced the need for electromechanical extensions of the switching fabric. This made it possible to assign multiple area codes to a single numbering plan area. An area code overlay required additional technology in all affected switching systems to recognize the local area codes and select the appropriate routing for local calls, even within the wire center. This eliminated the possibility of maintaining seven-digit dialing, and required the dialing of ten digits for all calls.

Consumer groups and some state regulators, such as the Illinois Commerce Commission and Citizens Utility Board for northwest Chicago, and the NYS Public Service Commission in NYC, opposed the requirement with attempts at litigation. The added effort in remembering and dialing longer numbers was perceived as a disadvantage of overlay plans, which were introduced to reduce the inconveniences associated with the traditional method of splitting an area. However, overlays have become the primary relief method and ten-digit dialing has become increasingly common in the U.S. and Canada.

== 1+10 dialing ==
Long-distance calls within a numbering plan area may also require dialing of an extra leading digit, designated as 1+10D. This became standard in all of North America by beginning of 1995 to allow introduction of interchangeable NPA codes, which are area codes that did not have a 0 or 1 as the middle digit and could therefore be confused with the central office code.

Dialing 1 before the area code is most often required only for long-distance calls. Some telephone systems in early overlay areas do not accept a "1" before the area code for local calls; all Canadian landlines follow this pattern. However, in metropolitan New York City and Chicago, as well as the entire state of California, the initial "1" is required even for local calls for landline phones located within an overlay complex or with a single NPA that also serves customers with a 988 NXX (see below). All cellphones in North America ignore this and only require the user to dial ten digits.

== Ten-digit dialing in non-overlay areas ==
A few area codes not part of any overlay complex nonetheless require ten-digit dialing if part of the local calling area is within an overlay complex. For example, the Fort Knox Army base in Kentucky is served by area code 502, but its local calling area includes cities that are served by the 270/364 overlay complex. As a result, Fort Knox imposed ten-digit dialing for all off-base numbers when the 270/364 overlay was established in 2014.

Area codes (in blue) affected in the lower 48 states.

A July 2020 order by the Federal Communications Commission required ten-digit dialing of telephone numbers with area codes in the United States that were not overlaid, but had an assignment of the central office prefix 988, conflicting with its designation for the National Suicide Prevention Lifeline by federal law.

NANPA Planning Letter 544 cites 83 area codes affected in 37 states. Three additional area codes were already transitioning to ten-digit dialing as the result of overlay implementations. Central office code 988 was in the process of discontinuation for area code 904. While included in the list of 83 area codes, area code 701 in North Dakota will not be converted to ten-digit dialing because the 32 telephone numbers in the 988 central office were reassigned to another prefix. Several of these codes have subsequently been converted to overlay complexes and the implementation of such complexes could be expedited as the transition to ten-digit dialing was not necessary.

As part of Canada's implementation of a national 9-8-8 hotline, the Canadian Radio-television and Telecommunications Commission (CRTC) announced in August 2022 that all remaining Canadian non-overlay areas with seven-digit dialing, most of which use "988" as a central office code under their respective area codes, were required to convert to ten-digit dialing by May 31, 2023. A partial exception was granted for the three northern territories served by area code 867, which was not projected to exhaust until at least 2043; only the Yellowknife area (which contains the 988 exchange) was required to convert, with seven-digit dialing remaining optional elsewhere in the region due in part to unique geographical and cultural considerations.

== See also ==
- List of telephone country codes
- Telephone numbering plan
