= Area code split =

Method of central office code relief in the NANP

In telecommunications, an area code split is the practice of introducing a new telephone area code by geographically dividing an existing numbering plan area (NPA), and assigning area codes to the resulting divisions, but retaining the existing area code only for one of the divisions. The purpose of this practice is to provide more central office prefixes, and therefore more telephone numbers, in an area with high demand for telecommunication services, and prevent a shortage of telephone numbers.

An increasing demand for telephone numbers has existed since the development of automatic telephony in the early 20th century, but was spurred especially since the 1990s, with the proliferation of fax machines, pager systems, mobile telephones, computer modems and, eventually, smart phones.

The implementation of an area code split typically involves the establishment of a Class-4 toll switching center for each division of the existing numbering plan area that receive a new area code. The local seven-digit telephone numbers in any of the areas are typically not changed. The existing central office prefixes are maintained and only the central offices of the new divisions are reassigned to a new area code. The impact of a split on the general public involves the printing of new stationery, advertisements, and signage for many customers, and the dissemination of the new area code to family, friends, and customers. Computer systems and telephone equipment may require updates in address books, speed dialing directories, and other automated equipment.

Since area code splits have substantial impact in the involved communities, and involve substantial cost in telephone plant and exchange equipment, they are planned carefully well ahead of implementation with the intent that an area is not again affected by a subsequent realignment for at least a decade.

The new boundaries of the numbering plan areas are drawn in a manner that minimizes splitting communities and should coincide with political subdivision where practical. Other geographic features, such as rivers and bodies of water, mountain ranges, or highways may serve as guides for boundary placements. Tributary toll telephone routes should not be unduly cut, so prevent rerouting to new toll center switching systems.

The area that retains the existing area code is typically the largest, or historically more established or developed place, but the locations of large government bodies or other criteria may affect this decision.

== Area code overlays ==
Not withstanding the desire for long-term stability of the local numbering plan and customer understanding, rapid growth in some areas has resulted in many splits within just a few years.

As a result, in the early 1990s, the North American Numbering Plan Administrator (NANPA) introduced another method for exhaustion relief: the area code overlay. This method assigns multiple area codes to the same numbering plan area, so that existing subscribers can keep established telephone numbers. Only new accounts and extra lines receive telephone numbers with the new area code. This method requires ten-digit dialing of local calls for customers of both area codes. Since 2007, most territories use overlays for mitigating numbering shortages. Most area code relief plans today do not even consider splits as relief options.

== See also ==
- Flash-cut
- Number pooling
- Permissive dialing
- Seven-digit dialing
- Telephone exchange
