= Index of Michigan-related articles =

The location of the state of Michigan in the United States of America

The following is an alphabetical list of articles related to the U.S. state of Michigan.

== 0–9 ==
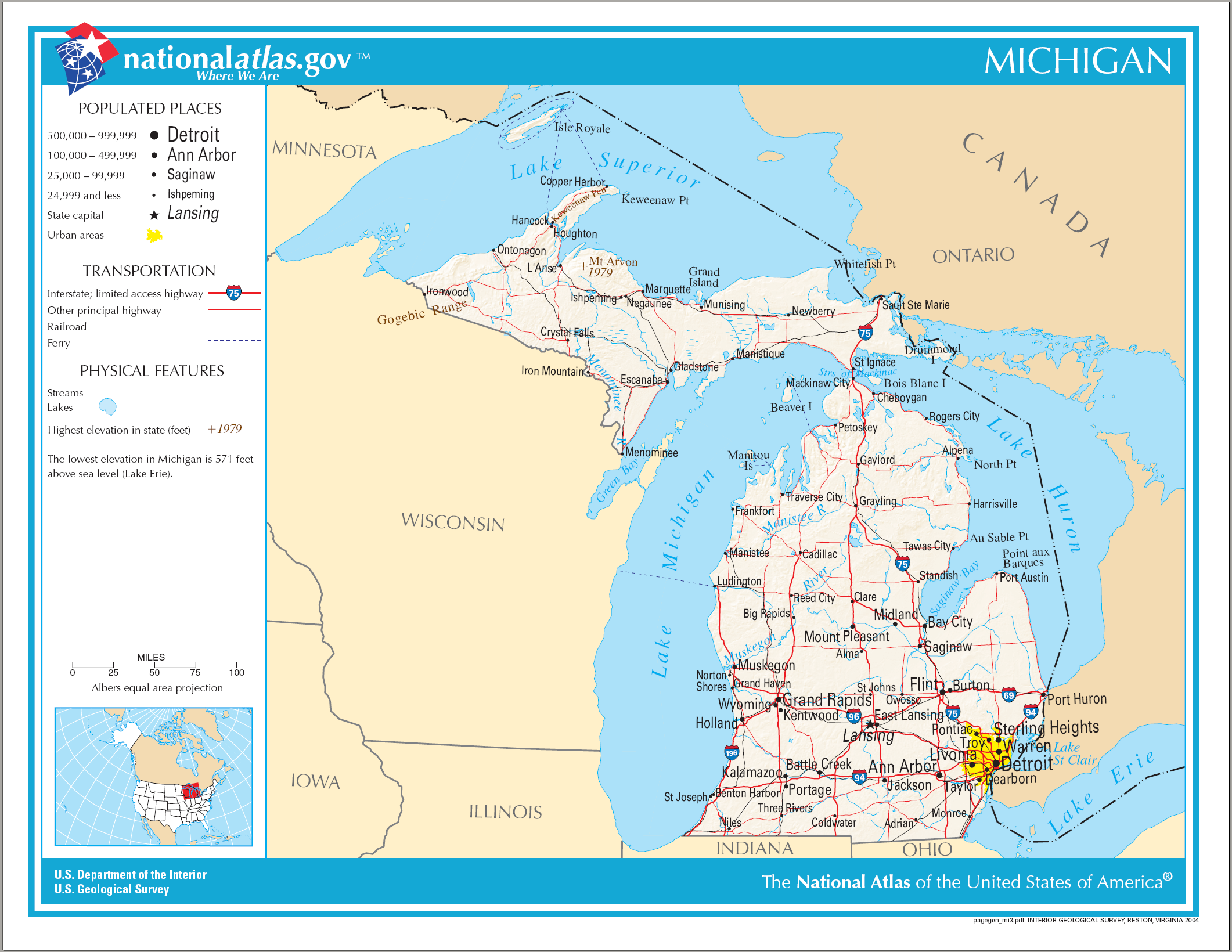
An enlargeable map of the state of Michigan

- .mi.us – Internet second-level domain for the state of Michigan
- 2020 coronavirus pandemic in Michigan

== A ==
- Adjacent states and province:
  - Province of Ontario
  - State of Illinois
  - State of Indiana
  - State of Minnesota
  - State of Ohio
  - State of Wisconsin
- Administrative divisions of Michigan
- Agriculture in Michigan
- Alger, Smith and Co.
- Alpena News
- Ambassador Bridge
- Amusement parks in Michigan
- Ann Arbor Railroad
- Aquaria in Michigan
  - commons:Category:Aquaria in Michigan
- Arboreta in Michigan
  - commons:Category:Arboreta in Michigan
- Archaeological sites in Michigan
  - commons:Category:Archaeological sites in Michigan
- Area codes in Michigan
- Art museums and galleries in Michigan
  - commons:Category:Art museums and galleries in Michigan
- Astronomical observatories in Michigan
  - commons:Category:Astronomical observatories in Michigan

== B ==
- Bath School disaster
- Binder Park Zoo
- Blue Water Bridge
- Big Chief Sugar
- Botanical gardens in Michigan
  - commons:Category:Botanical gardens in Michigan
- Buildings and structures in Michigan
  - commons:Category:Buildings and structures in Michigan

== C ==
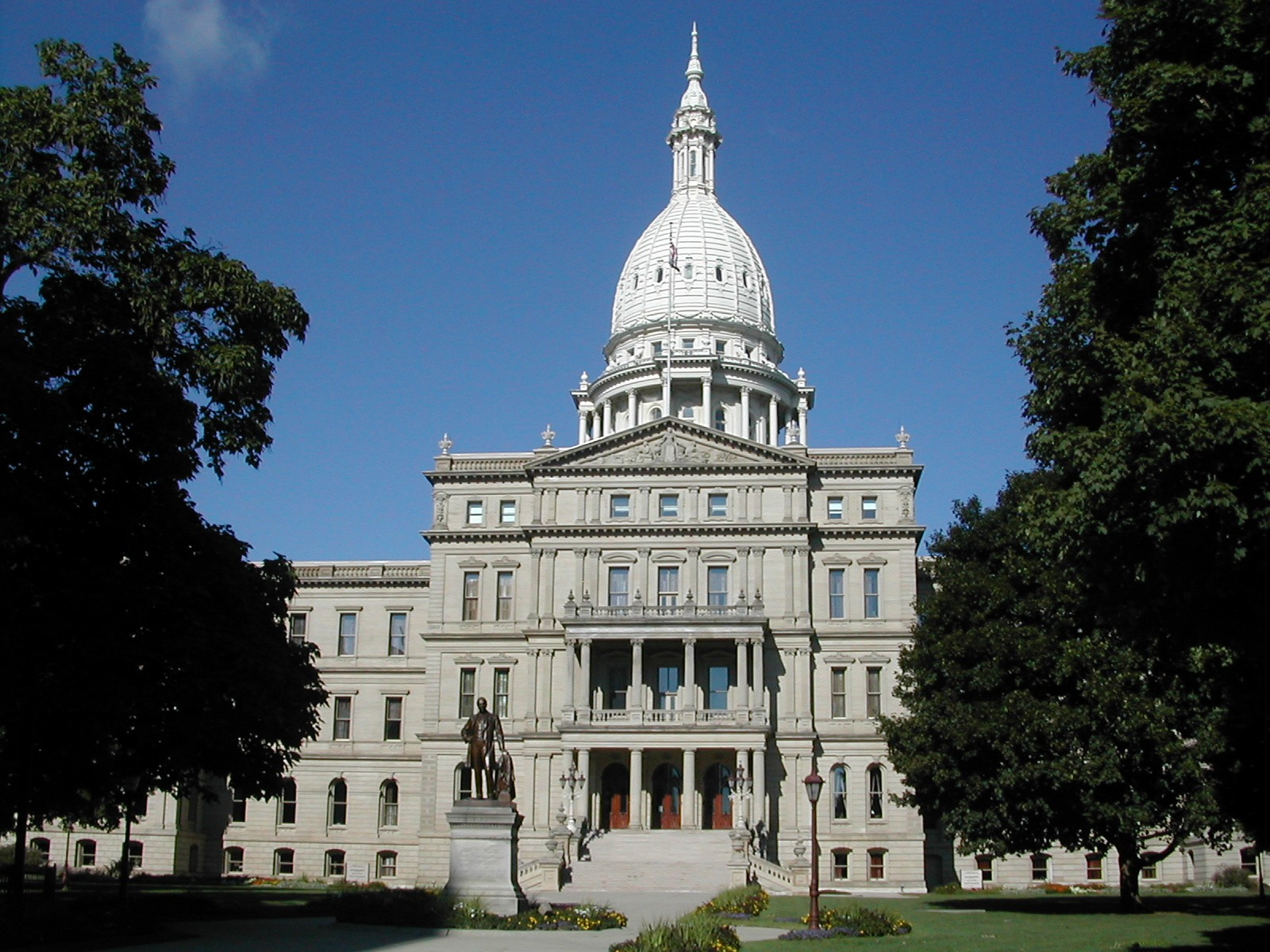
The Michigan State Capitol in Lansing

- Cabinet counties
- Capital of the State of Michigan
- Capitol of the State of Michigan
  - commons:Category:Michigan State Capitol
- Casinos in Michigan
- Cass Lake (Michigan)
- Central Michigan

An enlargeable map of the 83 counties of the state of Michigan

- Chicago and West Michigan Railway
- Christmas, Michigan
- Chrysler Corporation
- Cincinnati, Saginaw and Mackinaw Railroad
- Climate of Michigan
- Climate change in Michigan
- Clinton-Kalamazoo Canal
- Communications in Michigan
  - commons:Category:Communications in Michigan
- Constitution of Michigan
- Convention centers in Michigan
  - commons:Category:Convention centers in Michigan
- Copper Country
- Copper mining in Michigan
- Counties of the state of Michigan
  - commons:Category:Counties in Michigan
- Category:Culture of Michigan
  - commons:Category:Michigan culture

== D ==
- Demographics of Michigan
- Detroit, Michigan, territorial capital 1805-1812 and 1813–1837, state capital 1837-1847
- Detroit and Mackinac Railway
- Detroit Free Press
- Detroit Ignition
- Detroit Lions
- Detroit Pistons
- Detroit Red Wings
- Detroit River
- Detroit Shock
- Detroit Sunday Journal
- Detroit Tigers
- Detroit Zoo
- DeYoung Family Zoo
- Dow Chemical Company
- Dow Corning

== E ==
- Eastern white pine
- Economy of Michigan
  - Category:Economy of Michigan
    - commons:Category:Economy of Michigan
- Education in Michigan
  - Category:Education in Michigan
    - commons:Category:Education in Michigan
- Elections in Michigan
  - Category:Elections in Michigan
    - commons:Category:Elections in Michigan
- Emerald ash borer
- Environment of Michigan
  - commons:Category:Environment of Michigan

== F ==
The Flag of the State of Michigan

- List of festivals in Michigan
  - commons:Category:Festivals in Michigan
- Flag of the State of Michigan
- Flint/Tri-Cities
- List of Michigan flowers
- Ford Motor Company
- Forts in Michigan
  - Category:Forts in Michigan
    - commons:Category:Forts in Michigan
- Marshall Fredericks
- Frederick Carl Frieseke

== G ==
The Great Seal of the State of Michigan

- Garlyn Zoo
- General Motors Corporation
- Geography of Michigan
  - Category:Geography of Michigan
    - commons:Category:Geography of Michigan
- Geology of Michigan
  - commons:Category:Geology of Michigan
- Gerald Ford
- Ghost towns in Michigan
  - Category:Ghost towns in Michigan
    - commons:Category:Ghost towns in Michigan
- Golf clubs and courses in Michigan
- Government of the state of Michigan website
  - Category:Government of Michigan
    - commons:Category:Government of Michigan
- Governor of the State of Michigan
  - List of governors of Michigan
- Grand River Avenue
- Great Lakes
- Great Lakes Central Railroad
- Great Lakes region
- Great Lakes Waterway
- Great Seal of the State of Michigan

== H ==
- Hartwick Pines State Park
- Heritage railroads in Michigan
  - commons:Category:Heritage railroads in Michigan
- Hiawatha National Forest
- Highway system of Michigan
- Hiking trails in Michigan
  - commons:Category:Hiking trails in Michigan
- History of Michigan
  - Historical outline of Michigan
    - Category:History of Michigan
      - commons:Category:History of Michigan
- Huron National Forest
- Huron-Manistee National Forests
- Houghton, Michigan

== I ==
- Images of Michigan
  - commons:Category:Michigan
  - Category:Images of Metro Detroit
- Interlochen State Park
- Islands of Michigan
- Isle Royale National Park

== J ==
- John Ball Park

== K ==
- Kmart
- Keweenaw Peninsula
- Keweenaw Waterway

== L ==
An enlargeable map of Michigan showing the largest inland lakes

- Lakes in Michigan
  - Lake Erie
  - Lake Huron
  - Lake Michigan
  - Lake Saint Clair
  - Lake Superior
  - Category:Lakes of Michigan
    - commons:Category:Lakes of Michigan
- Landmarks in Michigan
  - commons:Category:Landmarks in Michigan
- Lansing, Michigan, state capital since 1847
- Lansing Lugnuts
- Law schools in Michigan
- Lighthouses of Michigan
- Lighthouses in the United States
- Lists related to the state of Michigan:
  - List of airports in Michigan
  - List of automobile manufacturers of Michigan
  - List of ballot measures in Michigan
  - List of butterflies in Michigan
  - List of cities, villages, and townships in Michigan
  - List of Civil War regiments from Michigan
  - List of colleges and universities in Michigan
  - List of companies based in Michigan
  - List of counties of Michigan
    - List of county-designated highways in Michigan
  - List of covered bridges in Michigan
  - List of dams and reservoirs in Michigan
  - List of ghost towns in Michigan
  - List of governors of Michigan
    - List of governors of Michigan Territory
  - List of high schools in Michigan
  - List of individuals executed in Michigan
  - List of Interstate Highways in Michigan
  - List of islands of Michigan
  - List of lakes in Michigan
  - List of law enforcement agencies in Michigan
  - List of lighthouses in Michigan
  - List of mayors of Detroit, Michigan
  - List of mayors of Grand Rapids, Michigan
  - List of mayors of Lansing, Michigan
  - List of mayors of Saginaw, Michigan
  - List of Michigan placenames of Native American origin
  - List of mines in Michigan
  - List of municipalities in Michigan (by population)
  - List of museums in Michigan
  - List of National Historic Landmarks in Michigan
  - List of newspapers in Michigan
  - List of Olympic medalists from Michigan
  - List of people from Michigan
  - List of people from Saginaw, Michigan
  - List of power stations in Michigan
  - List of protected areas in Michigan
  - List of Pure Michigan Byways
  - List of radio stations in Michigan
  - List of railroads in Michigan
  - List of Registered Historic Places in Michigan
  - List of rivers in Michigan
  - List of school districts in Michigan
  - List of shopping malls in Michigan
  - List of sister cities in Michigan
  - List of state forests in Michigan
  - List of state parks in Michigan
  - List of state prisons in Michigan
  - List of symbols of the State of Michigan
  - List of state trunklines in Michigan
  - List of tallest buildings in Michigan
  - List of telephone area codes in Michigan
  - List of television stations in Michigan
  - List of threatened fauna of Michigan
  - List of townships in Michigan
  - List of Michigan's congressional delegations
  - List of United States congressional districts in Michigan
  - List of United States representatives from Michigan
  - List of United States senators from Michigan
  - List of U.S. Highways in Michigan
  - List of weather records of Michigan
- Lower Peninsula of Michigan
- Lumberman's Monument

== M ==
- Mackinac Bridge
- Manistee National Forest
- Maps of Michigan
  - commons:Category:Maps of Michigan
- Jacques Marquette
- Marquette, Michigan
- Merit Network
- Metro Detroit
- MI – United States Postal Service postal code for the State of Michigan
- MiCorps
- Mid-Michigan
- Midwest
- Michiana
- Michigan
- Category:Michigan
  - commons:Category:Michigan
    - commons:Category:Maps of Michigan
- Michigan AuSable Valley Railroad
- Michigan Basin
- Michigan Court of Appeals
- Michigan Democratic Party
- Michigander
- Michigan Intercollegiate Athletic Association
- Michigan Islands Wilderness Area
- Michigan Islands National Wildlife Refuge
- Michigan left
- Michigan maps
- Michigan Mountain Biking Association
- Michigan Public Transit Association
- Michigan Religious Freedom Restoration Act
- Michigan Republican Party
- Michigan Schools and Government Credit Union
- Michigan State Capitol
- Michigan State Police
- Michigan State University
- Michigan Sugar Company
- Michigan Supreme Court
- Michigan Technological University
- Michigan Territory
- Michigan wine
- The Mining Journal
- Monuments and memorials in Michigan
  - commons:Category:Monuments and memorials in Michigan
- Mountains of Michigan
  - commons:Category:Mountains of Michigan
- Museums in Michigan
  - Category:Museums in Michigan
    - commons:Category:Museums in Michigan
- Music of Michigan
  - commons:Category:Music of Michigan
  - Category:Musical groups from Michigan
  - Category:Musicians from Michigan

== N ==
- National forests of Michigan
  - commons:Category:National Forests of Michigan
- Natural gas pipelines in Michigan
- Natural history of Michigan
  - commons:Category:Natural history of Michigan
- Nature centers in Michigan
  - commons:Category:Nature centers in Michigan
- Nestlé
- Newspapers published in Michigan
- Non-profit organizations based in Michigan
- Nordhouse Dunes Wilderness
- Northern Michigan
- Northern Michigan Football League
- Northland Center (Michigan)
- Northville, Michigan
- Northwest Territory
- Northern Michigan University
- Novi, Michigan

== O ==
- Ottawa National Forest
- Outdoor sculptures in Michigan
  - commons:Category:Outdoor sculptures in Michigan

== P ==
- The Palace of Auburn Hills
- People from Michigan
  - Category:People from Michigan
    - commons:Category:People from Michigan
    - Category:People from Michigan by populated place
    - Category:People from Michigan by county
    - Category:People from Michigan by occupation
- Pere Marquette Railway
- Petoskey stone
- Pewabic Pottery
- Pictured Rocks National Lakeshore
- Pioneer Sugar
- Pioneer Surgical Technology
- Orlando Poe
- Politics of Michigan
  - commons:Category:Politics of Michigan
- Potter Park Zoological Gardens
- Protected areas of Michigan
  - Category:Protected areas of Michigan
    - commons:Category:Protected areas of Michigan
- Pure Michigan
  - Pure Michigan Byway

== R ==
- Railroad museums in Michigan
  - commons:Category:Railroad museums in Michigan
- Regions of Michigan
- Religion in Michigan
  - Category:Religion in Michigan
    - commons:Category:Religion in Michigan
- Repopulation of wolves in Midwestern United States
- Rockwell Medical

== S ==
- St. Clair River
- St. Mary's River
- Henry Schoolcraft
- Saginaw Trail
- Scouting in Michigan
- Seamanite
- Settlements in Michigan
  - Cities in Michigan
  - Villages in Michigan
  - Townships in Michigan
  - Census Designated Places in Michigan
  - Other unincorporated communities in Michigan
  - List of ghost towns in Michigan
- Ski areas and resorts in Michigan
  - commons:Category:Ski areas and resorts in Michigan
- Sleeping Bear Dunes National Lakeshore
- Solar power in Michigan
- Southern Michigan
- Southwest Michigan Devil Rays
- Sports in Michigan
  - commons:Category:Sports in Michigan
- Sports venues in Michigan
  - commons:Category:Sports venues in Michigan
- State of Michigan website
  - Government of the State of Michigan
    - Category:Government of Michigan
      - commons:Category:Government of Michigan
- Stratton, Mary Chase Perry
- Structures in Michigan
  - commons:Category:Buildings and structures in Michigan
- Symbols of the State of Michigan
  - Michigan state bird: American robin (Turdus migratorius)
  - Michigan state coat-of-arms: Coat-of-Arms of the State of Michigan
  - Michigan state fish: brook trout (Salvelinus fontinalis)
  - Michigan state flag: Flag of the State of Michigan
  - Michigan state flower: apple blossom (Malus domestica)
  - Michigan state fossil: mastodon (Mammut americanum)
  - Michigan state game animal: white-tailed deer (Odocoileus virginianus)
  - Michigan state gem: Isle Royale greenstone (chlorastrolite)
  - Michigan state mammal: wolverine (Gulo gulo luscus) (unofficial)
  - Michigan state motto: Si quaeris peninsulam amoenam circumspice (Latin for "If you seek a pleasant peninsula, look about you") (unofficial)
  - Michigan state nicknames: Wolverine State and Great Lakes State (unofficial)
  - Michigan state reptile: western painted turtle (Chrysemys picta bellii)
  - Michigan state seal: Great Seal of the State of Michigan
  - Michigan state soil: Kalkaska sand
  - Michigan state song: "My Michigan" website
  - Michigan state stone: Petoskey stone
  - Michigan state tree: eastern white pine (Pinus strobus)
  - Michigan state wildflower: dwarf lake iris (Iris lacustris)
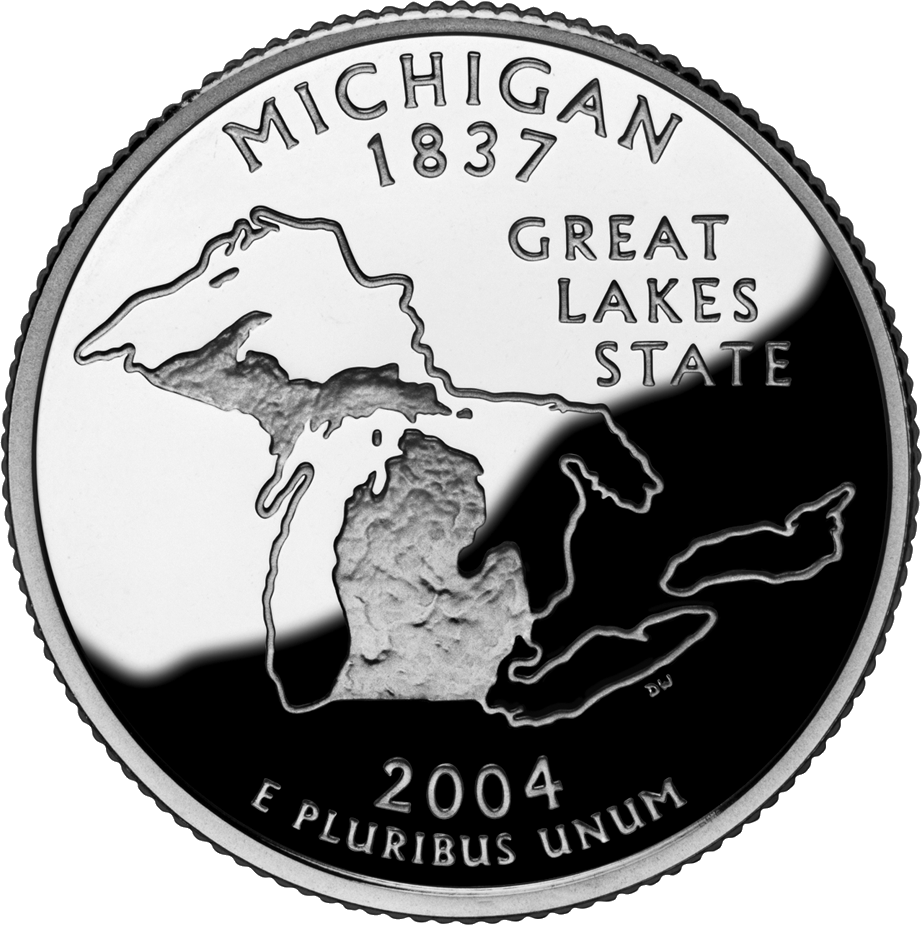
  - United States quarter dollar - Michigan 2004

== T ==
- Telecommunications in Michigan
  - commons:Category:Communications in Michigan
- Telephone area codes in Michigan
- Television stations
- The Thumb
- Theatres in Michigan
  - commons:Category:Theatres in Michigan
- Tiger Stadium
- Toledo Strip
- Toledo War
- Tourism in Michigan website
  - commons:Category:Tourism in Michigan
- Transportation in Michigan
  - Category:Transportation in Michigan
    - commons:Category:Transport in Michigan
- Traverse City Record-Eagle

== U ==
- United States of America
  - States of the United States of America
  - United States census statistical areas of Michigan
  - Michigan's congressional delegations
  - United States congressional districts in Michigan
  - United States Court of Appeals for the Sixth Circuit
  - United States District Court for the Eastern District of Michigan
  - United States District Court for the Western District of Michigan
  - United States representatives from Michigan
  - United States senators from Michigan
- University of Michigan
- Upper Midwest
- Upper Peninsula of Michigan
- US-MI – ISO 3166-2:US region code for the State of Michigan

== W ==
- Water in Michigan
- Water parks in Michigan
- Waterfalls of Michigan
  - commons:Category:Waterfalls of Michigan
- West Michigan Whitecaps
- Western Michigan
  Wikimedia
  - Wikimedia Commons:Category:Michigan
    - commons:Category:Maps of Michigan
  - Wikinews:Category:Michigan
    - Wikinews:Portal:Michigan
  - Wikipedia Category:Michigan
    - Wikipedia Portal:Michigan
    - Wikipedia:WikiProject Michigan
      - Category:WikiProject Michigan articles
      - Wikipedia:WikiProject Michigan/Members
- Wind power in Michigan
- Wisconsin v. Michigan

== Y ==
- Yooper

== Z ==
- Zoos in Michigan
  - commons:Category:Zoos in Michigan

== See also ==
- Topic overview:
  - Michigan
  - Outline of Michigan
