= Outline of Michigan =

U.S. state

The flag of Michigan

The seal of Michigan

The location of the state of Michigan in the United States of America

The following outline provides an overview of and topical guide to the U.S. state of Michigan:

Michigan is located in the Great Lakes Region of the United States of America, comprising two separate peninsulas.

== General reference ==
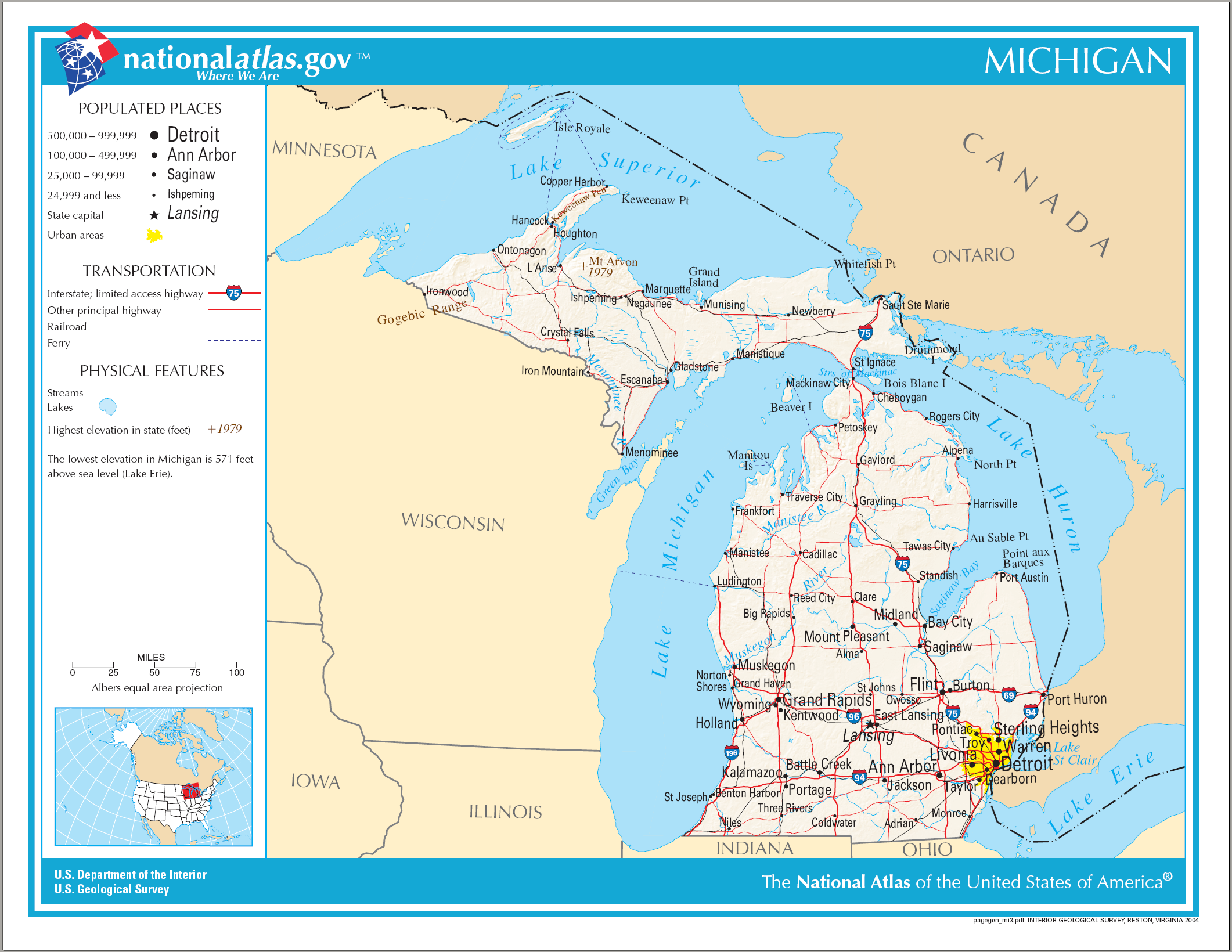
An enlargeable map of the state of Michigan

- Names
  - Common name: Michigan
    - Pronunciation: /ˈmɪʃɪɡən/
  - Official name: State of Michigan
  - Abbreviations and name codes
- Postal symbol: MI
- ISO 3166-2 code: US-MI
- Internet second-level domain: .mi.us
  - Nicknames
    - The Great Lakes State (previously used on license plates)
    - Pure Michigan (currently used to promote tourism and on highway signs, currently used on license plates)
    - Spectacular Peninsulas (previously used on license plates)
    - Mitten State
    - Winter Water Wonderland (previously and currently used on license plates)
    - Wolverine State
    - The Birthplace of Automotives
- Adjectival: Michigan
- Demonyms
  - Most common:
    - Michigander
  - Less common:
    - Michiganian
    - Michiganite
    - Michiganer

== Geography of Michigan ==
Geography of Michigan

- Michigan is: a U.S. state, a federal state of the United States of America
- Population: 10,077,331 (2020), 10th in the U.S.
- Size: 96,716 sq miles (250,493 km^{2}), 11th in the U.S., width: 386 miles (621 km), length: 456 miles (734 km), 41.5% water

=== Location of Michigan ===
Location: 41° 41' N to 48° 18' N latitude, 82° 7' W to 90° 25' W longitude

- Regions in which Michigan is located:
  - Northern Hemisphere
  - Western Hemisphere
    - Americas
      - North America
        - Anglo America
        - Northern America
          - United States of America
            - Contiguous United States
              - Central United States
                - Corn Belt
                - East North Central States
              - Midwestern United States
          - Great Lakes Region
- Located next to:
  - Adjacent states
    - State of Illinois
    - State of Indiana
    - State of Minnesota
    - State of Ohio
    - State of Wisconsin
  - Adjacent Canadian province
    - Province of Ontario, Canada
- Time zones:
  - Eastern (UTC-5/-4), 79 of 83 counties
  - Central (UTC−6/-5), 4 western U.P. counties

=== Demography of Michigan ===
- Census statistical areas
- Demographics

=== Environment of Michigan ===
- Climate
  - Climate change in Michigan
- Flora and fauna
  - Upper Peninsula
  - Lower Peninsula
    - Northern Michigan
  - Flora
  - Fauna
    - Birds
    - Butterflies and moths
    - Frogs and toads
    - Mammals
    - Reptiles
- Geology
- Protected areas
  - National battlefield park: River Raisin
  - National forests
  - National historical park: Keweenaw
  - National lakeshores: Pictured Rocks and Sleeping Bear Dunes
  - National memorial: Father Marquette
  - National Natural Landmarks
  - National marine sanctuary: Thunder Bay
  - National park: Isle Royale
  - National Wild and Scenic Rivers
  - National and international wildlife refuges
  - National wilderness areas
  - State forests
  - State game and wildlife areas
  - State parks, forests, recreation areas, and scenic sites
  - Regional and local parks
    - Grand Rapids
    - Huron–Clinton Metroparks
    - Midland County
- Superfund sites
- Water

=== Natural geographic features of Michigan ===
- Great Lakes
- Islands
- Lakes – Michigan state has 64,980 inland lakes and ponds.
- Mountains
- Rivers
- Waterfalls

=== Places in Michigan ===
- Historic places
  - National Historic Landmarks
  - National Historic Bridges
  - State Capitol Building
- Populated places
- Tourist attractions
  - Tourist attractions in Metro Detroit

=== Regions of Michigan ===
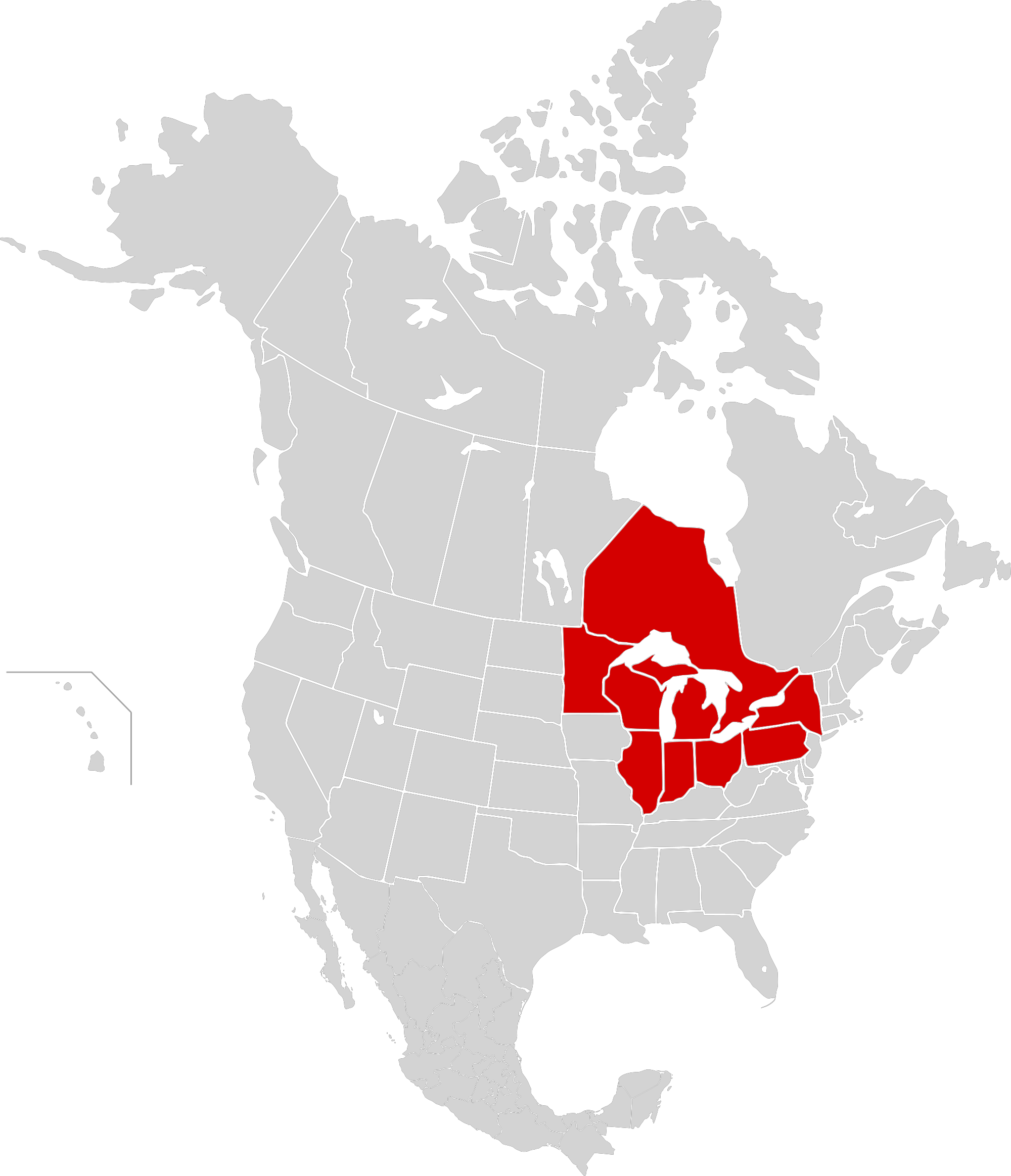
Great Lakes region

Midwest region

Upper Peninsula

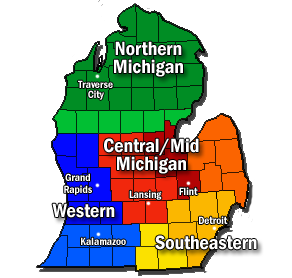
Lower Peninsula Regions

- United States
  - Great Lakes region, Midwest U.S. Census Bureau region, sometimes "Middle West", "Old Northwest", or "North Central" region
    - State of Michigan
      - Upper Peninsula
        - Copper Country
        - Keweenaw Peninsula
      - Lower Peninsula
        - Northern Michigan
        - Mid-Michigan
          - Central Michigan
          - Flint/Tri-Cities
          - The Thumb
          - Southern Michigan
        - West Michigan
          - Southern Michigan
          - Michiana
        - Southeast Michigan
          - Metro Detroit
- ZIP code range: 48001-49971 (1752 zip codes)
- Area codes: 231, 248, 269, 313, 517, 586, 616, 734, 810, 906, and 989

== Government and politics of Michigan ==
Government of Michigan

- Politics
  - Elections
  - Electoral reform
  - Political party strength
    - Democratic Party
    - Republican Party
    - Green Party
    - Libertarian Party
    - Socialist Party
- Michigan's congressional delegations
  - Michigan's congressional districts
- U.S. federal courts
  - U.S. Supreme Court
    - U.S. Court of Appeals for the Sixth Circuit
      - U.S. District courts

=== Branches of the government of Michigan ===
Government of Michigan

- Executive branch
  - Governor
    - Departments
  - Lieutenant Governor
  - Secretary of State
  - Attorney General
- Legislative branch (bicameral)
  - Michigan Senate (upper house)
  - Michigan House of Representatives (lower house)
- Judicial branch
  - Supreme Court
    - Court of Appeals

=== Military in Michigan ===
- Michigan Department of Military and Veterans Affairs
  - Michigan National Guard
    - Michigan Army National Guard
    - Michigan Air National Guard
  - Volunteer Defense Force (MI VDF)

=== Local government in Michigan ===
Administrative divisions of Michigan

An enlargeable map of the 83 counties of the State of Michigan

- 83 counties
  - Cities, villages, townships, and unincorporated communities
    - Villages
    - Townships
    - Unincorporated communities
    - State capital: Lansing
    - Largest city: Detroit
    - City nicknames
    - Sister cities
    - Lost cities, towns, and counties
      - Ghost towns
      - Former cities
      - Former villages
      - Defunct townships

=== Laws in Michigan ===
- Federal law
- Michigan law
  - Michigan Compiled Laws
  - Capital punishment
  - Constitution of Michigan
  - Crime in Michigan
  - Gun laws
  - Same-sex marriage

=== Law enforcement in Michigan ===
- State and local law enforcement agencies
  - Conservation Officers
  - County prosecuting attorney
  - County sheriffs
  - Department of Corrections
    - Prisons
  - Local police departments
  - State Police
- Federal law enforcement agencies
  - Federal Bureau of Investigation
  - U.S. Attorney
  - U.S. Customs and Border Protection
  - U.S. Marshals Service
  - U.S. Secret Service

== History of Michigan ==
- History of Michigan
- Category:History of Michigan
  - commons:Category:History of Michigan

=== Historic locations in Michigan ===
- National Historic Landmarks
- National Register of Historic Places

=== Historical libraries, societies and museums in Michigan ===
- Historical libraries and museums
  - Arab American National Museum, Dearborn
  - Byron Area Historic Museum
  - Charles H. Wright Museum of African American History, Detroit
  - Detroit Historical Museum
  - Great Lakes Shipwreck Museum, Whitefish Point
  - Henry Ford Museum and Greenfield Village, Dearborn (a.k.a. The Henry Ford)
  - Holocaust Memorial Center, Farmington Hills
  - Michigan Historical Center, Lansing
  - Motown Historical Museum, Detroit (a.k.a. Hitsville U.S.A.)
  - Ukrainian American Archives and Museum of Detroit, Hamtramck
  - William L. Clements Library, Ann Arbor
- Historical societies
  - Bluewater Michigan Chapter of the National Railroad Historical Society
  - Canton Historical Society and Museum
  - Detroit Historical Society
  - Great Lakes Shipwreck Historical Society, Whitefish Point
  - Keweenaw County Historical Society
  - Leelanau Historical Society and Museum
  - Mason County Historical Society
  - Michigan Pioneer and Historical Collection, Lansing (Historical Society of Michigan)
  - Michigan Supreme Court Historical Society, Lansing
  - Tecumseh Historical Society
  - Ypsilanti Historical Society

=== History of Michigan, by period ===
- Timeline of Michigan history
- Indigenous peoples
  - Algonquian peoples
- French colony of Canada, 1668–1763
  - Fort Pontchartrain du Détroit, 1701–1779
  - Fort Michilimackinac, 1715–1783
- French colony of la Louisiane, 1699–1764
- French and Indian War, 1754–1763
  - Treaty of Fontainebleau of 1762
  - Treaty of Paris of 1763
- British (though predominantly Francophone) Province of Quebec, 1763–1791
- American Revolutionary War, April 19, 1775 – September 3, 1783
  - United States Declaration of Independence, July 4, 1776
  - Treaty of Paris, September 3, 1783
  - Unorganized territory of the United States, 1783–1787
- Territory Northwest of the River Ohio, 1787–1803
- Territory of Indiana, 1800–1816
- Territory of Michigan, 1805–1837
  - War of 1812, June 18, 1812 – March 23, 1815
    - Siege of Detroit, 1812
    - Treaty of Ghent, December 24, 1814
- State of Michigan becomes 26th State admitted to the United States of America on January 26, 1837
  - Mexican–American War, April 25, 1846 – February 2, 1848
  - American Civil War, April 12, 1861 – May 13, 1865
    - Civil War units
    - Detroit race riot of 1863
  - Prohibition in Detroit, 1919–1933
    - Rum-running in Windsor
    - The Purple Gang
    - The reign of Singing Sam, 1921–1930
  - New Deal, 1933–1936
  - Detroit race riot of 1943
  - Detroit riot of 1967
  - Kilpatrick and Beatty text-messaging scandal, 2008

=== History of Michigan, by region ===
- Midwestern United States
  - Michigan
    - Upper Peninsula
      - Superior (proposed U.S. state)
      - Keweenaw Peninsula
    - Lower Peninsula
      - Sleeping Bear Dunes National Lakeshore
        - Port Oneida Rural Historic District
      - The Thumb
      - Ann Arbor
      - Detroit
      - Saginaw
      - Wyandotte
      - Williamston

=== History of Michigan, by subject ===
- Algonquian peoples
- Bath School disaster
- Chrysler Corporation
- Civil War units
- Ford Motor Company
- General Motors Corporation
- Ghost towns in Michigan
- Legal history
- Michigan State University
- New Deal
- Purple Gang
- Railroads
- University of Michigan
- Toledo War (a.k.a. Michigan-Ohio War)
- Wisconsin v. Michigan border dispute court cases

=== History of Michigan, lists of people ===
- Early settlers
- Notable people from:
  - Upper Peninsula
  - Northern Michigan
  - Western Michigan
  - Central Michigan
  - The Thumb
  - Metro Detroit
- Governors of Michigan
  - Territorial governors
- In the American Civil War
- Olympic medalists
- Politicians
- Michigan's congressional delegations
  - U.S. representatives
  - U.S. senators

=== History of Michigan, people ===
- People from Michigan
  - Cass, Lewis
  - Chrysler, Walter
  - Custer, George Armstrong (raised in Monroe)
  - Edison, Thomas (raised in Port Huron)
  - Ford, Gerald (38th President of the United States)
  - Ford, Henry
  - Hoffa, James R. "Jimmy"
  - Malcolm X (raised in Lansing)
  - Marquette, Jacques (a.k.a. Père Marquette)
  - Parks, Rosa (lived in Detroit)
  - Pontiac (Obwandiyag)
  - Salk, Jonas (University of Michigan faculty member)
  - Schoolcraft, Henry
  - Seaborg, Glenn T. (1951 Nobel Prize in Chemistry)
  - Stewart, Potter (Associate Justice of the U.S. Supreme Court)
  - Ting, Samuel C. C. (1976 Nobel Prize in Physics)
  - Reuther, Walter
  - Weller, Thomas Huckle (1954 Nobel Prize in Medicine)
  - Woodcock, Leonard

=== History publications about Michigan ===
- Michigan History magazine

== Culture of Michigan ==
The Flag of the State of Michigan

The Great Seal of the State of Michigan

- Cuisine
- Festivals
- Museums
- Religion
  - The Church of Jesus Christ of Latter-day Saints
  - Episcopal Diocese
- Scouting
- State Symbols
  - Flag
  - Great Seal
- Motto: Si quaeris peninsulam amoenam circumspice (If you seek a pleasant peninsula, look about you)

=== The Arts in Michigan ===
- Art museums and galleries
- Artists
- Authors
- Films
- Museums
- Music
- Musicians
- Theater

=== Culture by region ===
- Culture of Detroit

=== Sports in Michigan ===
Sports in Michigan

- College
- High school
- Professional
  - Detroit Lions, football
  - Detroit Pistons, basketball
  - Detroit Red Wings, hockey
  - Detroit Tigers, baseball
- List by sport
- List by city

== Economy and infrastructure of Michigan ==
- Buildings and structures
  - Airports
  - Bridges
    - Ambassador Bridge
    - Blue Water Bridge
    - Mackinac Bridge
    - Sault Ste. Marie International Bridge
  - Power stations
  - Hospitals
- Companies
- Newspapers
- Non-profit organizations
- Radio stations
- Television stations
- Transportation
  - State Trunkline Highway System
    - Interstate Highways
    - U.S. Highways
    - State highways
  - Railroads
  - Soo Locks

== Education in Michigan ==
Education in Michigan

- School districts
  - High schools
- Private schools
- Colleges and universities

== See also ==
- Topic overview:
  - Michigan
  - Index of Michigan-related articles
