= List of Michigan area codes =

The U.S. state of Michigan is divided into 11 numbering plan areas (NPAs) in the North American Numbering Plan (NANP), which are served by a total of 13 area codes. Two NPAs are configured as an overlay complex.

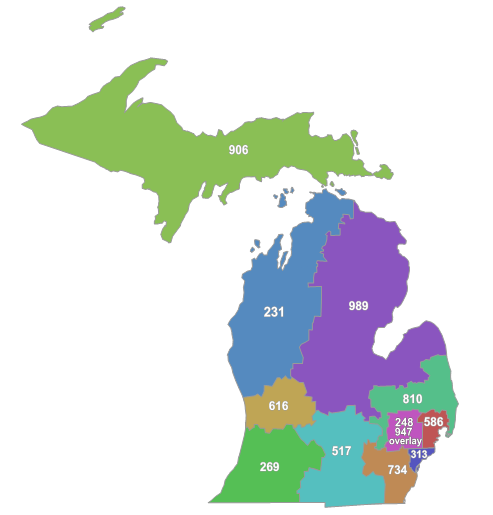

Area code	Year created	Parent NPA	Overlay	Numbering plan area
313	1947	–	313/679	Wayne County: Detroit, Dearborn, Redford Township, and the Grosse Pointes
679	2025	313	313/679	Wayne County: Detroit, Dearborn, Redford Township, and the Grosse Pointes
734	1997	313	–	Western and Downriver/Southeastern Michigan Metro Detroit: Ann Arbor, Monroe, Wayne, and Ypsilanti
810	1993	313	–	Southern Flint/Tri-Cities and The Thumb: Port Huron, Flint, Flushing, Otisville, Davison, Brighton, Sandusky, and Lapeer
248	1997	810	248/947	Northern Metro Detroit: All of Oakland County, Northville, and most of Northville Township
947	2002	248	248/947	Northern Metro Detroit: All of Oakland County, Northville, and most of Northville Township
586	2001	810	–	Northeastern Metro Detroit: All of Macomb County
517	1947	–	–	South Central Michigan: Lansing, East Lansing, Jackson, Charlotte, Coldwater, Howell, Hillsdale, and Adrian
989	2001	517	–	Northern, Flint/Tri-Cities and Northeastern Lower Michigan: Alpena, Oscoda, Tawas City, Mt. Pleasant, Bay City, Saginaw, Midland, Owosso, Gaylord, Bad Axe, Sebewaing, and Unionville
616	1947	–	–	Western Michigan: Grand Rapids, Holland, Greenville, Grand Haven, Zeeland, and Ionia
906	1961	616	–	Upper Peninsula: Marquette, Sault Ste. Marie, St. Ignace, Escanaba, Iron Mountain, Munising, and Mackinac Island
231	1999	616	–	Northwestern Lower Michigan: Traverse City, Ludington, Muskegon, Petoskey, Big Rapids and Cheboygan
269	2002	616	–	Southwestern Michigan: Battle Creek, Benton Harbor, Allegan, Hastings, Kalamazoo, and St Joseph
