= Area codes 519, 226, 548, and 382 =

Telephone area code for southwestern Ontario, Canada

Coordinates: 42°45′N 81°49′W

Area codes 519, 226, 548, and 382 are telephone overlay area codes in the North American Numbering Plan (NANP) for most of southwestern Ontario.

Area code 519 was the initial code of the numbering plan area (NPA), an area that was established in 1953 in a remapping of the previous numbering plan areas in the region, namely the western portion of 416 and the southwestern portion of 613. The new numbering plan area was mostly bounded by area code 905, except for Simcoe County, which has the area code 705. Area code 226 was added to the numbering plan area in 2006 in a conversion to an overlay numbering plan. Area codes 548 and 382 were added to this area in 2015 and 2023, respectively.

The primary incumbent local exchange carrier (ILEC) in the overlay complex is Bell Canada, with numerous other small independent companies that covered vast tracts of rural Ontario. Since competition for service was mandated in 1997, numerous competitive local exchange carriers (CLECs) have also started serving the region.

== History ==
Evolution of area codes in Ontario and southwestern Quebec

In the buildout of the nationwide toll routing system, area code 519 was created in 1953 by a border rearrangement of two numbering plan areas (NPAs), from the western portion of 416 and the southwestern portion of 613. In 1957, parts of 519 and 613 formed area code 705.

An exhaustion study for area code 519 in the 1990s resulted in a recommendation to the Canadian Radio-television and Telecommunications Commission (CRTC) to add a second area code, 226, to the numbering plan area. In 1992, an overlay relief plan was approved (Telecom Decision CRTC 2002-25). Although it primarily accepted the industry proposal, the CRTC required a permissive dialling period of four months, with consistent network announcements to consumers, instead of the proposed two-month period. On April 15, 2003, the committee recommended delaying the introduction of the 226 area code from February 19, 2005, to October 21, 2006, primarily as a result of updated forecasts of the exhaustion projections.

In a second overlay expansion, area code 548 was added to the overlay, effective June 4, 2015.

Canadian Numbering Administrator (CNA) advised the CRTC on October 12, 2011, that based on the rate of expansion the numbering system would again be exhausted by January 2017. The CRTC in response developed a relief plan (Telecom Decision CRTC 2012-655) which set the framework for addressing the exhaustion and oversee the addition of an additional overlay number. Area code 382 was reserved as a fourth code for the region with an in-service date of June 17, 2023.

The numbering plan area covers a wide area (over 36,000 km^{2}), and no single municipality has a majority of the available numbers.

While the implementation of 548 had the effect of allocating a total of over 23 million numbers to a region of 2.6 million people, overlays have become the preferred method of relief in Canada and the United States. Canada does not use telephone number pooling as a relief measure. Each CLEC is allocated blocks of 10,000 numbers (corresponding to a single three-digit prefix) for every rate centre where it offers service, even in the smallest hamlets. While most rate centres do not need nearly that many numbers, once a central office code is allocated to a carrier and rate centre, it cannot be relocated.

Area code 487 is reserved as the fifth area code for the region since May 2025.

== Central office codes ==
- Acton (226)–298 327 828 901, (519)–853, 929
- Alvinston (226)–471 716 846, (519)– 847 898
- Amherstburg (226)–477, (519)–713 730 736
- Arkona See Lambton Shores
- Arthur (226)–443 524, (519)–848
- Atwood (226)–816, (519)–356
- Aylmer (226)–342 545, (519)–765 773 779
- Ayr (226)–556 642 854, (519)–394 547 632
- Baden (226)–355 855, (519)–214 556 634
- Bayfield (226)–441, (519)–565
- Beachville (519)–423
- Belle River (226)–409 478, (519)–715 728
- Blenheim (226)–291 367, (519)–676
- Bothwell (226)–292 834, (519)–695
- Brantford (226)–208 227 250 267 269 368 381 387 388 400 401 403 450 493 583 644 730 802 851 920 922 933 934 937 938 966, (519)–209 304 309 512 516 717 720 732 750 751 752 753 754 755 756 757 758 759 761 770 771 774 802 805 861 865 900, (548)–800
- Breslau (226)–366 632 856, (519)–213 648
- Bright's Grove (226)–469, (519)–869 908
- Brussels (226)–889, (519)–887, (548)–571
- Burford (226)–659, (519)–449
- Burgessville (519)–424
- Caledon (519)–316 927
- Cambridge is divided into the following local rate centres:
  - Galt (226)–318 362 474 533 616 765 859 894 895, (519)–231 267 543 618 620 621 622 623 624 629 740
  - Hespeler (226)–201 218 243 319 341 362 475 566 696 755 860 887 890 924, (519)–212 220 221 222 223 224 230 239 240 241 242 244 248 249 260 277 651 654 658 700 714 716 841
  - Preston (226)–204 473 535 865, (519)–201 219 650 653 920 947
- Chatham (226)–205 229 281 282 296 312 404 494 542 626 627 671 797 798 799 830 881 882 996, (519)–350 351 352 354 355 358 359 360 365 380 388 397 401 436 437 480 598 784 809 917
- Chatsworth (519) –794
- Chesley (226)–433, (519) –363
- Clifford (519) –327
- Clinton (226)–420 447 455 457 532 699, (519)–233 482 606 607
- Cottam (519)–839
- Corunna (226)–468, (519)–481 813 862
- Courtright (226)–371 467, (519)–431 867
- Delhi (226)–549, (519)–582
- Dorchester (519)–202 268 499
- Drayton (226)–223 818 857, (519)–638
- Dublin (226)–302, (519)–345
- Dutton (519)–762
- Dundalk (226)–274, (519)–923
- Dungannon (519)–529
- Durham (226)–258 432 702, (519)–369
- Embro (519)–475
- Elmira (226)–266 858, (519)–210 669 910
- Elora (226)–369 384 963, (519)–413 846
- Erin (519)–315 833
- Essex (226)–479 602 906, (519)–776 961
- Exeter (226)–393 423 735, (519)–235 297
- Fergus (226)–370 383 449 961, (519)–407 787 843
- Flesherton (519)–924
- Forest See Lambton Shores
- Glencoe (226)–427 488 690, (519)–287
- Goderich (226)–222 421 458 543 939 963, (519)–440 441 524 525 605 612 891 955, (548)–248 281 409 410 980
- Gorrie (519)–335
- Grand Bend See Lambton Shores
- Grand Valley (519)–928
- Granton (519)–225
- Guelph (226)–203 217 251 299 314 326 332 337 343 361 486 500 706 770 780 790 820 821 900 962 971 979, (519)–265 341 362 400 515 546 553 710 731 760 763 766 767 780 803 820 821 822 823 824 826 827 829 830 831 835 836 837 838 840 993 994, (548)–209 316 408 452 557 761 808 855 922 988 989
- Hamilton (Community of Lynden only) (519)–647
- Hanover (226)–434, (519)–364 506
- Harriston (226)–429, (519)–338 510
- Harrow (226)–207 480, (519)–738
- Hepworth (226)–437, (519)–935
- Highgate (226)–295 831, (519)–678
- Hillsburgh (519)–308 855
- Holstein (519)–334
- Ilderton (226)–308, (519)–298 666
- Ingersoll (226)–825, (519)–303 425 485 926
- Inwood (519)–844
- Jarvis (226)–513 630, (519)–587
- Kerwood (519)–247
- Kincardine (226)–396, (519)–396
- Kingsville (519)–712 733
- Kitchener–Waterloo (226)–214 215 220 240 241 243 317 336 338 339 359 399 444 476 499 505 581 592 600 606 646 647 666 673 686 747 748 749 750 751 752 772 789 791 792 800 806 808 812 868 898 929 972 978 986 987 988 989, (519)–208 240 279 340 342 404 465 489 496 497 498 500 501 502 503 504 505 513 514 554 568 569 570 571 572 573 574 575 576 577 578 579 580 581 584 585 588 589 590 591 593 594 597 603 616 635 707 721 722 725 729 741 742 743 744 745 746 747 748 749 772 778 781 783 804 807 880 883 884 885 886 888 893 894 895 896 897 904 954 957 998, (548)–212 219 288 333 480 481 483 484 898
- Lambeth (226)–265, (519)–652
- Lambton Shores (226)–331 520 521 (519)–238 243 296 786 828 899
- LaSalle (226)–675, (519)–734 970 978
- Leamington (226)–202 286 936, (519)–322 324 325 326 329 398 613
- Lion's Head (519)–793
- Listowel (226)–306 430 622 640 767 885, (519)–291 292 418 444 492 815
- London (226)–209 213 219 224 234 235 236 237 238 239 260 268 270 271 272 273 289 305 316 358 373 374 376 377 378 380 385 386 448 456 504 559 577 580 582 599 636 663 667 678 680 688 700 701 721 777 781 785 813 884 919 925 926 927 928 968 969 973 977 980 981 982 983 984 985 998, (519)–200 203 204 266 280 281 282 286 317 318 319 430 432 433 434 435 438 439 451 452 453 455 457 471 472 473 474 476 488 494 495 518 520 521 552 601 614 615 617 619 630 636 639 640 641 642 643 645 646 649 657 659 660 661 663 667 668 670 671 672 673 675 679 680 681 685 686 690 691 694 697 701 702 709 719 777 789 808 850 851 852 854 857 858 859 860 868 870 871 872 873 878 884 902 907 913 914 930 931 932 933 936 937 951 953 963 964
- Long Point (519)–586
- Lucan (226)–305, (519)–227
- Lucknow (519)–528, 812
- Lynden (226)–731 764, (519)–647
- Maidstone (226)–252, (519)–737
- Malahide - See Aylmer
- Mapleton - See Drayton
- Markdale (226)– 278 452, (519)–986
- Meaford (226)–245 662, (519)–538
- Melbourne (519)–289
- Merlin (226)–293, (519)–689
- Mildmay (226)–454, (519)–367
- Milverton (226)–439, (519)–595
- Mitchell (226)–303, (519)–348
- Monkton (226)–817, (519)–347
- Mount Brydges (226)–490, (519)–264 559
- Mount Forest (226)–445 853 991, (519)–261 313 314 321 323 509 604
- Nairn (226)–329, (519)–232
- Neustadt (226)–428, (519)–799
- Newbury (519)–693
- New Dundee (226)–565 862, (519)–391 413 696
- New Hamburg (226)–333 863, (519)–545 662
- Norwich (226)–325, (519)–468 863
- Oil Springs (226)–372 466, (519)–834
- Orangeville (226) –200 259 850 882 916 (519)–215 216 217 278 288 307 415 806 938 939 940 941 942 943
- Owen Sound (226)–256 277 279 379 424 537 568 664 668 908 909 910 923 974, (519)–270 370 371 372 373 374 375 376 377 378 379 387 416 447 470 477
- Palmerston (226)–431, (519)–343 417
- Paris (226)–225 263 677 733, (519)–302 442
- Parkhill (519)–294 459
- Pelee (519)–724
- Petrolia (226)–465 738, (519)–882
- Port Dover (519)–583
- Port Elgin (226)–453 930 992, (519)–385 386 389 706 708 832
- Port Franks See Lambton Shores
- Port Rowan (519)–586
- Port Stanley (226)–658, (519)–782
- Ridgetown (226)–297 364, (519)–674
- Ripley (226)–395, (519)–395
- Rockwood (226)–328 838 902, (519)–605 856
- Sarnia (226)–254 313 349 357 402 472 672 718 776 778 784 842 886 932 964, (519)–312 328 330 331 332 333 336 337 339 344 346 381 383 384 402 464 466 479 490 491 541 542 704 918
- Sauble Beach (226)–438, (519)–422
- Seaforth (519)–522 527 600
- Sebringville (519)–393
- Shedden (519)–764
- Shelburne (226)–525, (519)–306 925
- Simcoe (226)–206 330 440 514 534 567 931, (519)–410 420 426 427 428 429 718 909
- St. Clements (226)–255 866, (519)–218 407 699
- St. Jacobs (226)–288 867, (519)–206 664 906
- St. Marys (226)–264 301 661, (519)–284
- St. Thomas (226)–210 212, (519)–207 631 633 637
- Stratford (226)–261 300 354 584 633 766 775 779 786 852 880 921 999 (519)–271 272 273 274 275 276 301 305 508 703 801 814 949
- Strathroy (226)–726, (519)–205 245 246 299
- Southampton (226)–284 435, (519)–483 797
- Tara (519)–934
- Tavistock (519)–412 655
- Tecumseh (226)–676, (519)–478 735 739 956 979
- Teeswater (519)–392
- Thamesford (519)–285 295 557
- Thamesville (226)–249 334, (519)–692
- Thedford See Lambton Shores
- Thornbury (226)–276 665, (519)–599
- Thorndale (226)–561, (519)–461 609
- Tilbury (226)–335 832, (519)–607 682
- Tillsonburg (226)–231 351 352 641 970 993, (519)–407 544 550 688 842 983
- Tiverton (519)–361 368
- Tobermory (519)–596
- Wallaceburg (226)–746 833, (519)–626 627 628
- Walkerton (226)–257 285 436 840 990, (519)–507 540 881 889 901
- Wardsville (226)–670, (519)–693
- Waterford (519)–443
- Watford (226)–462 720 848, (519)–849 876
- Wellesley (226)–244 660 869, (519)–406 656
- Wheatley (226)–248 484 617 618 619, (519)–825
- Wiarton (226)–439, (519)–534
- Windsor (226)–216 221 246 260 280 315 340 344 345 346 347 348 350 356 506 526 620 674 722 757 758 759 773 774 782 783 787 788 805 826 935 946 965 975, (519)–250 251 252 253 254 255 256 257 258 259 300 419 551 560 561 562 563 564 566 567 790 791 792 796 800 816 817 818 819 890 903 915 916 919 944 945 946 948 960 962 965 966 967 968 969 971 972 973 974 977 979 980 981 982 984 985 987 988 989 990 991 992 995 996 997 999
- Wingham (226)–422 841 995, (519)–357 450 530 531 912
- Woodstock (226)–228 232 242 253 853 883 888, (519)–290 320 421 456 469 532 533 535 536 537 539 602 606 708 788
- Wyoming (226)–307 461, (519)–845

== See also ==
- List of Ontario area codes
- List of North American Numbering Plan area codes

Ontario area codes: 416/437/647/942, 519/226/548/382, 613/343/753, 705/249/683, 807, 905/289/365/742
	North: 249/705	
West: 313, 586, 734, 810, 989	226/382/519/548	East: 249/705, 289/365/905
	South: 216, 419/567, 436/440, 582/814	
Michigan area codes: 231, 248/947, 269, 313/679, 517, 586, 616, 734, 810, 906, 989
Ohio area codes: 216, 330/234, 419/567, 440/436, 513/283, 614/380, 740/220, 937/326
Pennsylvania area codes: 215/267/445, 412, 570/272, 610/484/835, 717/223, 724, 814/582, 878
