= Area codes 705, 249, and 683 =

Area codes of northeastern and central Ontario, Canada

Area codes 705, 249, and 683 are telephone area codes in the North American Numbering Plan (NANP) for most of northeastern and central Ontario in Canada. Area code 705 was created in a 1956 area code split from portions of the 613 and 519 numbering plan areas. After a reduction in geographic coverage in 1962, the numbering plan area was assigned a second area code, 249, in 2011 to form an overlay numbering plan. A third area code, 683, was added in June 2022.

== History ==
Ontario received two area codes, 416 and 613, in the initial configuration of the first continental telephone numbering plan in 1947. Numbering plan area 416, in the southern part of the province, was reduced in geographic extent in 1953 and area code 519 was assigned to the western part of the province. In 1956, area code 705 was assigned to portions of the 613 and 519 numbering plan areas, serving nearly all of Ontario north and west of the Golden Horseshoe. In 1962, the resulting numbering plan area was reduced in geographic extent by splitting off a portion with area code 807 for northwestern Ontario. Area code 705 was not in danger of exhaustion, but creating a new area code was needed to improve call routing from Manitoba and the rest of Western Canada to northwestern Ontario.

On March 19, 2011, numbering plan area 705 was converted to an overlay numbering plan with a second area code, 249. This required ten-digit dialling for local calls.

The Canadian Numbering Administration Consortium had considered "erasing" the 807-705 boundary and turning 807 into an overlay for all of northern Ontario, which would have effectively reversed the 1962 split, but did not recommend the idea for fear of potential confusion.

The incumbent local exchange carriers in 705/249 are Bell Canada, Northern Telephone, Bell Aliant (Ontera), Eastlink, and some municipally owned carriers.

In February 2017, area code 683 was reserved as a third area code for the numbering plan area, After further debate, it was decided to activate 683 as a third overlaid area code for this region, effective June 18, 2022. with an in-service activation date of June 18, 2022.

Area code 460 was reserved as a fourth area code for the region in November 2022.

== Service area ==
As of 2016, the numbering plan area has the following exchanges:

- Abitibi Canyon (705) – 334
- Alban (249) – 206, 318, 425 (705) – 857
- Algoma Mills (249) – 302, 456, 500, 508, 801 (705) – 208, 227, 573, 849
- Algonquin Park (249) – 563, 596 (705) – 633
- Alliston (249) – 221, 424, 501, 505, 523, 593, 594, 849, 867, 890 (705) – 250, 391, 415, 434, 435, 440, 502, 530, 890, 900
- Angus See Borden–Angus below
- Apsley (249) – 334, 648 (705) – 656
- Attawapiskat (249) – 445 (705) – 997
- Azilda (249) – 229, 270, 512 (705) – 512
- Bailieboro (249) – 647, 799 (705) – 940
- Bala (249) – 389, 539, 605 (705) – 762
- Barrie (249) – 288, 315, 359, 388, 444, 489, 495, 498, 535, 562, 595, 733, 800, 869, 877, 880, 888, 938, 989 (705) – 220, 229, 241, 252, 279, 300, 302, 305, 309, 315, 321, 331, 333, 354, 393, 401, 408, 417, 481, 500, 503, 623, 625, 627, 712, 715, 716, 717, 718, 719, 720, 721, 722, 725, 726, 727, 728, 730, 733, 734, 735, 737, 739, 770, 780, 790, 791, 792, 794, 795, 796, 797, 798, 800, 812, 814, 816, 817, 818, 828, 881, 896, 903, 915, 970, 984, 985, 986, 993, 999
- Batchawana Bay (249) – 457 (705) – 882
- Baysville (249) – 540, 564, 606 (705) – 767
- Beaverton (249) – 588, 934 (705) – 217, 426, 504
- Bethany (249) – 335, 646, 755 (705) – 276, 277, 608
- Biscotasing (249) – 271, 289 (705) – 239
- Blezard Valley (249) – 230, 272 (705) – 442, 485, 547, 588, 823, 897
- Blind River (249) – 458, 974 (705) – 356, 576
- Bluewater Beach (249) – 367, 667 (683) – 666 (705) – 361, 518
- Bobcaygeon (249) – 290, 329, 488, 490 (705) – 213, 392, 731, 738
- Bonfield (249) – 405, 965 (705) – 776
- Borden–Angus (249) – 227, 294, 368, 616, 668 (705) – 230, 410, 423, 424, 516
- Bracebridge (249) – 218, 299, 390, 403, 422, 487, 502 (705) – 204, 205, 394, 637, 640, 641, 644, 645, 646, 706, 708, 801, 952
- Brechin (249) – 251, 369, 454, 617, 669, 881 (705) – 484, 505, 714
- Bridgenorth (249) – 336, 576, 645 (705) – 292, 296, 954
- Britt (249) – 565 (705) – 383
- Bruce Mines (249) – 459, 975 (705) – 785
- Buckhorn (249) – 337, 644, 902 (705) – 657, 659, 979
- Burk's Falls (249) – 391, 597 (705) – 382
- Burleigh Falls (249) – 643 (705) – 654, 700
- Callander (249) – 406 (705) – 713, 752
- Calstock (705) – 463
- Cambray (705) – 374
- Cameron (249) – 630 (705) – 359
- Campbellford (249) – 339, 503, 509 (705) – 202, 395, 409, 632, 653, 661, 947
- Cannington (249) – 330, 556 (705) – 214, 432, 964
- Capreol (249) – 231, 273 (705) – 244, 397, 589, 824, 858
- Carnarvon (705) – 489
- Cartier (249) – 274, 304 (705) – 965
- Cavan (705) – 944
- Chapleau (249) – 276, 305, 319, 897 (705) – 600, 860, 864, 870, 902, 904
- Chelmsford (249) – 232, 277, 536 (705) – 855
- Christian Island (249) – 370, 670 (705) – 247
- Chub Lake (249) – 303, 461 (705) – 841
- Cobalt (705) – 629, 631, 679
- Coboconk (249) – 331 (705) – 216, 454
- Cochrane (249) – 313 (705) – 271, 272, 913
- Coldwater (249) – 538, 557 (705) – 686
- Collingwood (249) – 225, 399, 489, 499, 522, 533, 550, 553, 660, 759, 882, 887, 899 (705) – 293, 351, 416, 441, 443, 444, 445, 446, 467, 532, 539, 606, 607, 888, 994
- Coniston (249) – 233, 279 (705) – 453, 591, 694, 829
- Connaught (705) – 363
- Cookstown (249) – 252, 371, 663, 883 (683) – 444 (705) – 291, 458, 916
- Creemore (249) – 253, 372, 671 (705) – 466, 520
- Desbarats (249) – 462 (705) – 782
- Deux Rivieres (249) – 407 (705) – 747
- Dokis (249) – 408 (705) – 763
- Dorset (249) – 392, 598 (705) – 766
- Dubreuilville (249) – 280, 312 (705) – 884
- Dunsford (249) – 361 (705) – 793
- Dwight (249) – 566, 599 (705) – 635
- Earlton (705) – 563
- Echo Bay (249) – 463, 957 (705) – 248
- Elk Lake (705) – 678
- Elliot Lake (249) – 260, 404, 464, 960 (705) – 261, 461, 578, 827, 847, 848
- Elmvale (249) – 254, 306, 672 (683) – 600 (705) – 322, 515
- Emsdale (249) – 541, 567, 600 (705) – 636
- Englehart (705) – 544, 545, 961
- Espanola (249) – 200, 201, 202, 217, 234, 281, 402, 999 (705) – 480, 501, 583, 601, 862, 863, 869, 936
- Estaire (249) – 314 (705) – 695
- Fauquier (705) – 339, 376
- Fenelon Falls (249) – 291, 933, 998 (705) – 215, 886, 887
- Field (249) – 409 (705) – 758
- Foleyet (249) – 282, 496 (705) – 899
- Fort Albany (249) – 316 (705) – 278
- Garson (249) – 235, 284, 513 (705) – 459, 550, 592, 693, 699, 830
- Gogama (249) – 285, 365, 575 (705) – 602, 894, 895
- Gooderham (705) – 447
- Gore Bay (249) – 497, 746 (705) – 210, 282, 348
- Goulais River (249) – 465, 961 (705) – 301, 649
- Gowganda (705) – 624
- Gravenhurst (249) – 300, 420, 423 (705) – 681, 684, 687, 703, 710
- Greater Sudbury (249) – 203, 239, 266, 350, 360, 377, 431, 651, 804, 805, 806, 864, 878, 879, 885, 977, 979 (705) – 207, 222, 280, 404, 419, 449, 470, 479, 507, 521, 522, 523, 524, 525, 560, 561, 562, 564, 566, 585, 586, 618, 621, 626, 662, 664, 665, 669, 670, 671, 673, 674, 675, 677, 682, 688, 690, 691, 698, 699, 805, 806, 822, 885, 918, 919, 920, 921, 923, 929, 988
- Haileybury (705) – 407, 630, 672, 680
- Haliburton (249) – 773, 802 (705) – 306, 455, 457, 809, 854, 935
- Hanmer (249) – 236, 242, 514 (705) – 451, 551, 593, 831, 969
- Hastings (249) – 340, 517, 642 (705) – 609, 696, 697, 922
- Havelock (249) – 298, 341, 641 (705) – 778, 803, 838
- Hawk Junction (249) – 243, 382 (705) – 889
- Hearst (249) – 363 (705) – 362, 372, 373, 960
- Honey Harbour (249) – 432, 601 (705) – 756, 906
- Huntsville (249) – 216, 228, 338, 435, 478, 549, 558, 699, 700, 722, 778, 822, 833, 995 (705) – 224, 349, 380, 388, 535, 571, 704, 783, 784, 787, 788, 789, 909, 990
- Iron Bridge (249) – 466, 962 (705) – 509, 843
- Iroquois Falls (705) – 231, 232, 258
- Johnson – See Desbarats
- Kamiskotia (705) – 365
- Kapuskasing (249) – 874, 994 (705) – 319, 332, 335, 337, 347, 371, 557, 577
- Kashechewan (705) – 275
- Keene (705) – 295
- Killarney (249) – 245, 320, 384 (705) – 287
- Kinmount (705) – 488
- Kirkfield (249) – 333, 632 (705) – 438
- Kirkland Lake (249) – 355, 592, 654, 992 (705) – 462, 567, 568, 570, 572, 668, 962
- Lafontaine (249) – 255, 373, 673 (683) – 333 (705) – 533
- Lakefield (249) – 342, 518, 640 (705) – 651, 652
- Larder Lake (705) – 638, 643
- Latchford (705) – 676
- Lefroy (249) – 207, 212, 374 (683) – 777 (705) – 290, 456
- Levack (249) – 237, 244 (705) – 554, 595, 832, 966
- Lindsay (249) – 332, 346, 477, 702, 703 (705) – 212, 289, 307, 308, 320, 324, 328, 340, 341, 344, 464, 701, 702, 821, 878, 879, 880, 928, 934, 982
- Little Britain (249) – 629, 633 (705) – 786
- Little Current (249) – 247, 321, 386, 997 (705) – 368, 370, 398, 603, 968
- Lively (249) – 238, 246 (705) – 379, 483, 556, 596, 692, 836
- Mactier (249) – 393, 542, 607 (705) – 375
- Magnetawan (249) – 568, 602 (705) – 387
- Markstay (249) – 248, 426, 491, 803 (705) – 598, 853
- Marten River (705) – 892
- Massey (249) – 250, 322, 401 (705) – 582, 602, 865
- Matachewan (705) – 565
- Matheson (705) – 273
- Mattawa (249) – 400, 410, 966, 996 (705) – 200, 218, 281, 744
- McKellar (249) 213, 286, 584 – (705) – 389
- Midland (249) – 301, 307, 492, 554, 559, 649, 893 (683) – 800 (705) – 209, 245, 427, 433, 526, 527, 528, 529, 540, 543, 937, 956
- Milford Bay (249) – 569 (705) – 764
- Millbrook (705) – 932
- Mindemoya (249) – 777 (705) – 377
- Minden (705) – 286
- Missanabie (249) – 263, 429 (705) – 234
- Moonbeam (705) – 367, 681
- Moonstone (249) – 308, 552, 618, 674, 875, 876 (705) – 666, 834, 835
- Moose Factory (705) – 658
- Moosonee (705) – 336, 912
- Nephton (249) – 639 (705) – 877, 891
- New Liskeard (249) – 863, 991 (705) – 425, 622, 628, 647, 648, 650, 948
- Nobel (249) – 570 (705) – 342
- Noelville (249) – 264, 323, 430 (705) – 605, 898
- North Bay (249) – 328, 352, 358, 362, 506, 591, 650, 774, 983 (705) – 223, 303, 316, 358, 402, 471, 472, 474, 475, 476, 477, 478, 482, 490, 491, 492, 493, 494, 495, 496, 497, 498, 499, 667, 707, 825, 839, 840, 845, 978, 980, 995
- Norwood (249) – 577, 638, 932 (705) – 639, 660, 837
- Oakwood (249) – 634 (705) – 953
- Oba (249) – 265, 292, 438 (705) – 883
- Omemee (249) – 344, 637, 903, 922 (705) – 799, 802, 974
- Opasatika (705) – 369, 390
- Ophir (249) – 467 (705) – 736
- Orillia (249) – 209, 385, 449, 749, 891 (705) – 238, 242, 259, 298, 323, 325, 326, 327, 329, 330, 345, 350, 413, 418, 558, 619, 826, 907, 955
- Oro–Medonte (249) – 208, 309, 520 (683) – 500 (705) – 353, 487
- Otter Lake (249) – 224, 571 (705) – 378
- Parry Sound (249) – 219, 287, 317, 701, 866, 988 (705) – 203, 346, 746, 751, 771, 773, 774, 901, 938, 996
- Peawanuck (705) – 473
- Pefferlaw (249) –204, 241, 295, 349, 434, 665, 886 (705) – 318, 437, 513
- Penetanguishene (249) – 256, 375, 455, 521 (705) – 355, 549, 614
- Peterborough (249) – 353, 357, 387, 494, 504, 510, 516, 688, 872, 900, 901 (705) – 201, 243, 270, 304, 312, 313, 400, 403, 486, 536, 559, 616, 740, 741, 742, 743, 745, 748, 749, 750, 755, 760, 761, 768, 772, 775, 808, 813, 868, 872, 874, 875, 876, 917, 926, 927, 930, 931, 933, 957, 977, 991
- Pineal Lake (249) – 278 (705) – 861
- Pointe Au Baril (249) – 394, 608 (705) – 366
- Port Carling (249) – 395, 436, 543, 609 (705) – 765, 757
- Port Loring (249) – 412, 967 (705) – 757
- Port McNicoll (249) – 257, 364, 675 (705) – 506, 534
- Port Sydney (249) – 572 (705) – 385, 405
- Powassan (249) – 413, 968 (705) – 724
- Ramore (705) – 236
- Ramsay (249) – 293, 439 (705) – 299
- Redbridge (249) – 414 (705) – 663
- Restoule (249) – 415 (705) – 729
- Rosseau (249) – 222, 396 (705) – 732
- Sault Ste. Marie (249) – 356, 383, 479, 493, 507, 525, 622, 865, 889, 982, 990 (705) – 206, 251, 253, 254, 255, 256, 257, 260, 297, 420, 450, 541, 542, 574, 575, 759, 777, 779, 908, 910, 941, 942, 943, 945, 946, 949, 963, 971, 975, 987, 989, 992, 998
- Searchmont (249) – 469 (705) – 781
- Sebright (249) – 376, 676 (683) – 888 (705) – 833
- Severn Bridge (249) – 258, 347, 378, 661 (683) – 400 (705) – 514, 689
- Silverwater (249) – 440, 788 (705) – 283
- Smooth Rock Falls (249) – 545 (705) – 314, 338
- South Porcupine (705) – 235, 240, 412, 579
- South River (249) – 573, 603 (705) – 386
- Spanish (249) – 325, 441, 789, 898 (705) – 844, 846
- Sprucedale (249) – 574 (705) – 685
- St. Charles (249) – 324, 427, 790 (705) – 867
- St. Joseph Island (249) – 470, 963 (705) – 246
- Stayner (249) – 220, 379, 662, 892 (705) – 428, 430, 517
- Stroud (249) – 259, 380, 664, 941 (683) – 300 (705) – 294, 431, 436, 615
- Sturgeon Falls (249) – 215, 416, 515 (705) – 452, 580, 753, 893
- Sudbury – see Greater Sudbury
- Sultan (249) – 442, 791 (705) – 233
- Sunderland (705) – 219, 357, 973
- Sundridge (249) – 397, 604 (705) – 384
- Swastika (705) – 469, 642
- Temagami (705) – 237, 569
- Thessalon (249) – 471, 964 (705) – 508, 842
- Thorne (249) – 417 (705) – 981
- Timmins (249) – 351, 361, 750, 870 (705) – 221, 225, 262, 264, 265, 266, 267, 268, 269, 274, 288, 360, 399, 406, 465, 531, 620, 709, 951
- Trout Creek (249) – 418 (705) – 723
- Udora (249) – 205, 296, 433, 484, 666, 949 (705) – 228, 317
- Verner (249) – 214, 419 (705) – 581, 594
- Virginiatown (705) – 364
- Warkworth (249) – 297, 345, 636 (705) – 924, 925
- Warren (249) – 267, 326, 428, 792 (705) – 599, 967
- Wasaga Beach (249) – 261, 381, 589, 895 (705) – 352, 422, 429, 617
- Waubaushene (249) – 262, 366, 677 (683) – 200 (705) – 510, 538
- Wawa (249) – 268, 327, 443 (705) – 414, 804, 850, 852, 856, 914
- West Guilford (249) – 993 (705) – 754, 854
- Westree (249) – 446, 793 (705) – 263
- Whitefish (249) – 240, 447, 794 (705) – 546, 597, 866
- Whitefish Falls (249) – 269, 448, 795 (705) – 284, 285
- Wilberforce (705) – 448
- Windermere (249) – 398 (705) – 769
- Woodville (249) – 635 (705) – 439, 972
- Premium calls: 1+(249/705)–976.

== See also ==
- List of Ontario area codes
- List of North American Numbering Plan area codes

Ontario area codes: 416/437/647/942, 519/226/548/382, 613/343/753, 705/249/683, 807, 905/289/365/742
	North: 867	
West: 807, 906	705/249	East: 343/613, 819/873
	South: 289/365/905, 226/382/519/548, 906, 989	
Yukon, Northwest Territories and Nunavut area codes: 867
Quebec area codes: 367/418/581, 354/450/579, 263/438/514, 468/819/873
Michigan area codes: 231, 248/947, 269, 313/679, 517, 586, 616, 734, 810, 906, 989
