= MPTA =

MPTA may refer to:

- MPTA — Main Propulsion Test Article – part of the US Space Shuttle programme, see Orbiter Vehicle Designation
  - MPTA-098 (formerly MPTA)
  - MPTA-ET
- Michigan Public Transit Association
- Minnesota Public Television Association
