= Area code 734 =

Telephone area code for southeast Michigan, United States

Coordinates: 42.0°N 83.50°W

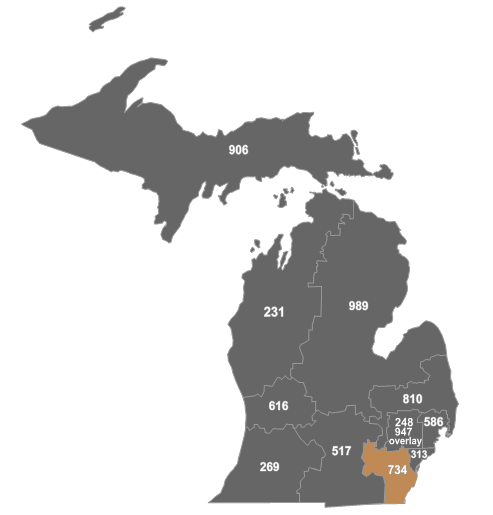
Michigan numbering plan areas with 734 highlighted.

Area code 734 is a telephone area code in the North American Numbering Plan (NANP) in southeast Michigan. It was created in 1997 in an area code split of 313. The numbering plan area (NPA) comprises all of Washtenaw and Monroe counties, and southern and western portions of Wayne County. It includes Ann Arbor, Ypsilanti, Saline, Chelsea, Milan, Belleville, Garden City, Wayne, Westland, Livonia, Canton, Pinckney, Plymouth, Plymouth Township, Monroe, Petersburg, Bedford, Romulus, Huron Township and the remainder of Downriver south of a border formed by Goddard Road in Taylor and the northern borders of the cities of Southgate and Wyandotte. Area code 734 also serves the west side of the city of Inkster.

In October 2025, the North American Numbering Plan Administrator projected that the area code will exhaust in the first quarter of 2040.

== See also ==
- List of Michigan area codes
- List of North American Numbering Plan area codes

Michigan area codes: 231, 248/947, 269, 313/679, 517, 586, 616, 734, 810, 906, 989
	North: 517, 810, 248/947	
West: 517	734	East: 313, 226/519/548/382
	South: 419/567	
Ohio area codes: 216, 330/234, 419/567, 440/436, 513/283, 614/380, 740/220, 937/326
Ontario area codes: 416/437/647/942, 519/226/548/382, 613/343/753, 705/249/683, 807, 905/289/365/742
