= Area code 906 =

Area code for the Upper Peninsula of Michigan

Coordinates: 46°N 87°W

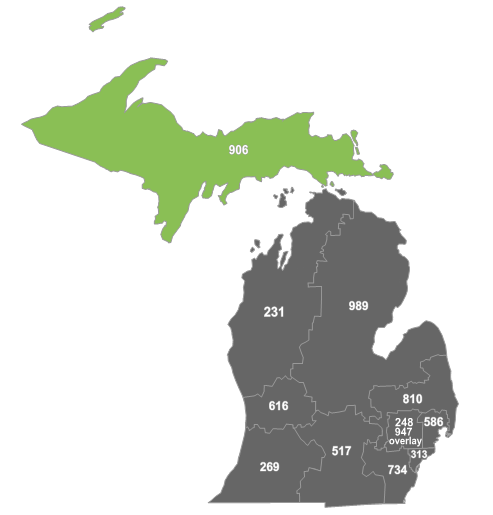
Numbering plan area 906 in Michigan (green)

Area code 906 is the telephone area code in the North American Numbering Plan (NANP) for the Upper Peninsula of Michigan.

== History ==
Area code 906 was formed in an area code split of numbering plan area (NPA) 616 on March 19, 1961. The split was implemented in a flash cut, with no permissive dialing period. 906 is among the least populous numbering plan areas in North America, serving only about 320,000 people. The latest NANP projections estimate the exhaustion of vacant central office codes for the 906 area code until the early to mid 22nd century, meaning that the Upper Peninsula will not need another area code for several decades. The area code has inspired an unofficial holiday in the Upper Peninsula on September 6 (906 correlating to the month/day date).

Prior to October 2021, area code 906 had telephone numbers assigned for the central office code 988. In 2020, 988 was designated nationwide as a dialing code for the National Suicide Prevention Lifeline, which created a conflict for exchanges that permit seven-digit dialing. This area code was therefore scheduled to transition to ten-digit dialing by October 24, 2021.

== Service area ==
The numbering plan area includes in the following cities:

- Baraga
- Calumet
- Escanaba
- Gladstone
- Hancock
- Houghton
- Iron Mountain
- Ironwood
- Ishpeming
- Kingsford
- L'Anse
- Marquette
- Manistique
- Menominee
- Newberry
- Norway
- St. Ignace
- Sault Ste. Marie

Isle Royale National Park and Mackinac Island also use the 906 area code.

Bois Blanc Township in the only municipality associated with the Upper Peninsula to not use area code 906. It is an island in Lake Huron whose only ferry service is with the closer Lower Peninsula, and therefore uses area code 231.

Most of the numbering plan area is in the Eastern Time Zone, except for the counties bordering Wisconsin, which are in the Central Time Zone.

== See also ==
- List of Michigan area codes
- List of North American Numbering Plan area codes

Michigan area codes: 231, 248/947, 269, 313/679, 517, 586, 616, 734, 810, 906, 989
	North: 705/249/683, Lake Superior	
West: 715/534	906	East: 705/249/683, Lake Huron
	South: 231, 715/534, 920/274, Lake Michigan	
Ontario area codes: 416/437/647/942, 519/226/548/382, 613/343/753, 705/249/683, 807, 905/289/365/742
Wisconsin area codes: 262, 414, 608/353, 715/534, 920/274
