= Area code 989 =

Area code in Michigan, United States

Coordinates: 44.5°N 84°W

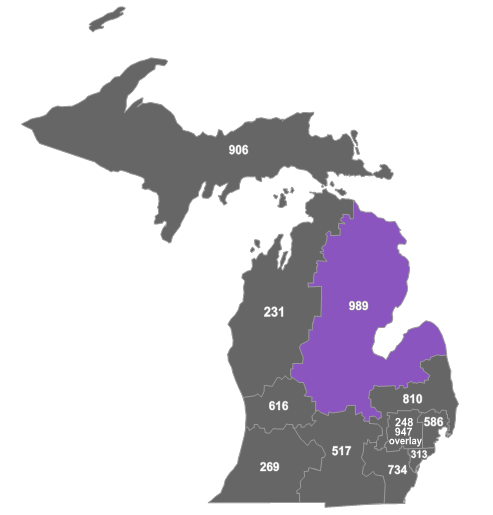
Map of area code 989 in Michigan.

Area code 989 is a telephone area code in the North American Numbering Plan for Central Michigan, the northeastern Lower Peninsula, and portions of the Thumb. It is the highest-numbered area code in use in the North American Numbering Plan (NANP), as well as the highest possible under the current system, in which a middle digit of 9 is forbidden.

== History ==
The 989 region split off from area code 517 in 2001. Before then, 517 had served most of the eastern half of the Lower Peninsula (except the southeast) for 54 years and had been the only one of Michigan's three original area codes to have never been split.

Prior to October 2021, area code 989 had telephone numbers assigned for the central office code 988. In 2020, 988 was designated nationwide as a dialing code for the National Suicide Prevention Lifeline, which created a conflict for exchanges that permit seven-digit dialing. This area code was therefore scheduled to transition to ten-digit dialing by October 24, 2021.

== Service area ==
Major cities and towns in the numbering plan area are:

- Alma
- Alpena
- Bad Axe
- Bay City
- Caro
- Clare
- Gaylord
- Grayling
- Houghton Lake
- Merrill
- Midland
- Mt. Pleasant
- Owosso
- Rogers City
- Saginaw
- St. Johns
- Tawas City
- West Branch

== See also ==
- List of Michigan area codes
- List of North American Numbering Plan area codes

Michigan area codes: 231, 248/947, 269, 313/679, 517, 586, 616, 734, 810, 906, 989
	North: 906, 705/249/683, Lake Huron	
West: 231, 616	989	East: 519/226/548/382, 705/249/683, Lake Huron
	South: 517, 810	
Ontario area codes: 416/437/647/942, 519/226/548/382, 613/343/753, 705/249/683, 807, 905/289/365/742
