= Area codes 313 and 679 =

Area codes in Detroit, Michigan

Coordinates: 42.3°N 83.1°W

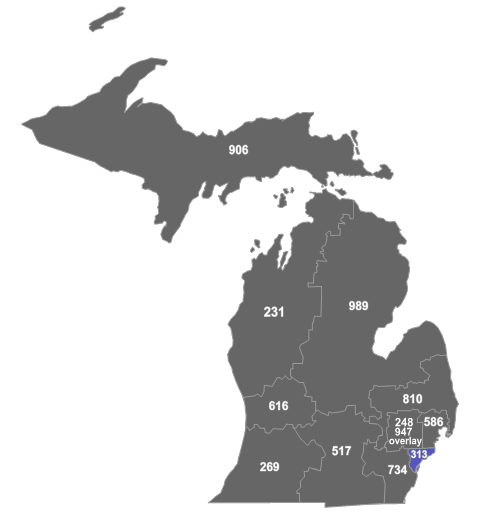
Map of Michigan numbering plan areas

Area codes 313 and 679 are telephone area codes in the North American Numbering Plan (NANP) serving Detroit and most of its closest suburbs in Wayne County, Michigan. It includes the enclave cities Hamtramck and Highland Park, as well as Allen Park, Dearborn, Dearborn Heights, Ecorse, the Grosse Pointe communities, Harper Woods, Inkster, Melvindale, Lincoln Park, Redford, River Rouge, and Taylor north of Goddard Road and east of Holland Road.

Area code 313 was assigned to all of Michigan in 1947, but has been reduced in geographical extent by area code splits. Area code 679 was added to the 313 numbering plan area in 2025, forming an overlay complex.

== History ==
Area code 313 was assigned as one of the original 86 area codes in October 1947, when it was designated to serve the southeastern quadrant of Michigan, including Metro Detroit, Flint, and the southern part of The Thumb. The rest of the eastern half of the Lower Peninsula was assigned to area code 517.

Because of the demand for new telephone service in Detroit's suburbs and neighboring areas, the northern portion, including Detroit's northern suburbs, Flint and the southern Thumb were split off with new area code 810 on 1 December 1993 with a permissive dialing period that ended on August 10, 1994. On 13 December 1997, the remaining 313 area was reduced to its current size when the western portion, including Ann Arbor, Monroe County and western and downriver Wayne County, received area code 734 in another split.

In February 2000, area code 679 was reserved for future numbering relief in form of an overlay complex for the 313 numbering plan area, as part of action for two other overlay plans in the larger Detroit metropolitan area. The relief schedule was canceled, however, in April 2000, and implementation of the overlay was suspended. Relief planning remained in progress, but 2021 estimates did not expect 313 to be exhausted until 2025, when in April the exhaustion threshold was extended to the first quarter of 2028.

Opponents of the overlay relief plan cited the cultural importance and impact of area code 313, in which "313" is often synonymous with the city of Detroit. On March 17, 2025, the Michigan Public Service Commission announced an overlay complex with new area code 679 with an in-service of November 7, 2025, which is the earliest date of central office code activation possible, given that all prefixes in 313 have been assigned. A permissive ten-digit dialing period for 313 was in effect for April 7, 2025 through October 7, 2025, after which time ten-digit dialing became mandatory.

== In popular culture ==
Rappers from Detroit often mention 313 in their music in reference to this area and its notoriety. One of the tracks in the 1996 Eminem independent debut solo album Infinite is titled "313". In the 2002 film 8 Mile, featuring the artist, the 313 area code is mentioned multiple times, because of the film's setting in Detroit. Eminem's character, B–Rabbit, and his friends call their group "three one third," their nickname for the area code. In the last rap battle of 8 Mile the first verse of the rap is "Now everybody from the 313, put your ... hands up and follow me!"

== See also ==
- List of Michigan area codes
- List of North American Numbering Plan area codes

Michigan area codes: 231, 248/947, 269, 313/679, 517, 586, 616, 734, 810, 906, 989
	North: 248/947, 586	
West: 734	313/679	East: 226/382/519/548
	South: 226/382/519/548, 734	
Ontario area codes: 416/437/647/942, 519/226/548/382, 613/343/753, 705/249/683, 807, 905/289/365/742
