= Area code 810 =

Telephone area code in east-central Michigan

Coordinates: 43.0°N 83.0°W

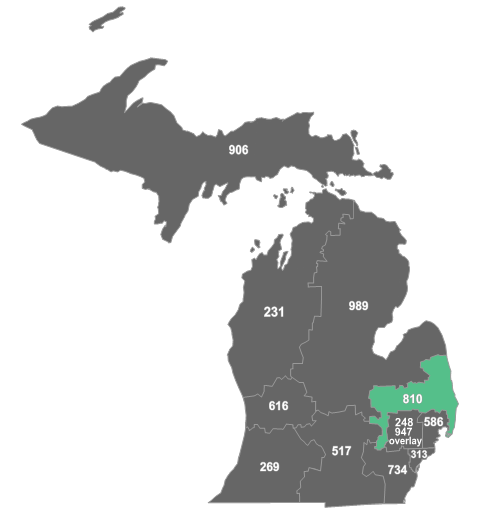
Map of Michigan, having numbering plan area 810 highlighted in green.

Area code 810 is a telephone area code in the North American Numbering Plan for the east-central part in the U.S. state of Michigan. The numbering plan area (NPA) comprises the cities of Flint, Lapeer, Port Huron, and the southern portion of the Thumb.

== History ==
Area code 810 was created on December 1, 1993, in a mid-eastern section of Michigan, when numbering plan area 313 in the southeaster part of the state was divided. A permissive dialing period ended on August 10, 1994 when both area codes could be dialed to reach destinations. The initial numbering plan area included the counties of Oakland, Macomb, Genesee, Lapeer, St. Clair, and Sanilac as well as small sections of Saginaw, Shiawassee, Livingston, Washtenaw, and Wayne counties north of Detroit. Most of Washtenaw County, all of Monroe County, and the southern and western portions of Wayne County (including the City of Detroit) remained in the 313 area code. The split created Michigan's first new area code since 1961, and permitted interchangeable central office codes.

Within only a year of the split, demand for telephone numbers increased such that there were plans for a new area code. Ameritech once again applied to the North American Numbering Plan Administrator for additional relief. As a result, Oakland County received the new area code 248, with a start of permissive dialing on May 10, 1997. The dividing line was drawn so 248 was surrounded on three sides by 810, with 313 to the south.

Then, only four years after splitting off area code 248, continued demand in the area necessitated the Michigan Public Service Commission to request another relief code, creating yet another numbering plan area in southeastern Michigan. Area code 586 was assigned to the eleven rate centers that comprise Macomb County, including Mt. Clemens, Roseville, Warren and Utica. The commission permitted the permanent grandfathering of wireless central office codes residing in rate centers that moved to the new NPA.

Prior to October 2021, area code 810 had telephone numbers assigned for the central office code 988. In 2020, 988 was designated nationwide as a dialing code for the National Suicide Prevention Lifeline, which created a conflict for exchanges that permit seven-digit dialing. This area code was therefore scheduled to transition to ten-digit dialing by October 24, 2021.

=== Prior usage of 810 for TWX ===
In 1962, AT&T assigned area code 510, then designated as a Service Access Code (SAC) of the format N10, for conversion to dial service of the Teletypewriter Exchange Service (TWX) in the United States. Later in the decade, additional area codes, including 810 were assigned. NPA 810 served a large area from Michigan southward to all of the southern and southeastern United States. Telex use of the area code was decommissioned in 1981 after conversion of the service to new transmission technologies by Western Union.

== Service area ==
The numbering plan area includes all of Genesee and Lapeer counties and portions of Oakland, Macomb, St. Clair, Sanilac and Livingston counties. This area included the following communities.

- Almont
- Brighton
- Burton
- Clio
- Columbiaville
- Croswell
- Davison
- Fenton
- Flint
- Flushing
- Goodrich
- Grand Blanc
- Hamburg
- Imlay City
- Lakeland
- Lapeer
- Lexington
- Linden
- Marine City
- Marysville
- Metamora
- Mount Morris
- Port Huron
- Sandusky
- St. Clair
- Swartz Creek
- Yale

Selected areas in north Oakland County areas of Oxford, Addison Township, Brandon Township, Groveland Township, and Holly are also partially served by 810.

== In popular culture ==
Jimmy "B-Rabbit" Smith (Eminem) refers to area code 810 while free-styling as he fixes his car in the movie 8 Mile to insult "posers" who live in upperclass southern Macomb County suburbs (which were part of the area code in 1995 when the movie was set) instead of the lower income area code 313, which serves Detroit and Wayne County.

The number "810", being the area code of Flint, the band's hometown, was used in the band name King 810 after they left Equal Vision.

== See also ==
- List of Michigan area codes
- List of North American Numbering Plan area codes

Michigan area codes: 231, 248/947, 269, 313/679, 517, 586, 616, 734, 810, 906, 989
	North: 989	
West: 517, 989	810	East: 519/226/548/382, Lake Huron
	South: 734, 248/947, 586	
Ontario area codes: 416/437/647/942, 519/226/548/382, 613/343/753, 705/249/683, 807, 905/289/365/742
