= Michigan Religious Freedom Restoration Act =

Michigan law

House Bill 5958, also known as the Religious Freedom Restoration Act, is a pending piece of legislation in Michigan that, opponents assert, may allow for the refusal of service, the denial of employment and of housing, and other actions that act against a citizen's rights if a person claims that working with or for that citizen would violate their religious freedom; however this much is only a speculation of the bills potential impacts. As it stands now, the bill moved to the Senate after passing in the house 59–50 along party lines.

Michigan's Speaker of the House, Republican Jase Bolger, has argued that the proposed measure is intended to cover issues such as a conservative Christian baker refusing to allow same-sex couples as customers and an Orthodox Jewish family refusing an autopsy on a family member that had died. Thus, those people could cite the act for support if it is enacted into law.

The measure has received opposition from organizations such as the Michigan Civil Rights Commission. Groups stating their support include the Michigan Catholic Conference. In general, the proposal has created an acrimonious partisan debate and also triggered multiple discussions by lawmakers in the state.

== Background ==
Michigan law currently prohibits discrimination due to religious beliefs against individuals in respect to some categories such as age and race. For instance, it is currently illegal for a landlord to refuse to house Jewish tenants due to the landlord's conservative Christian beliefs. The Elliott-Larsen Civil Rights Act, written and passed in 1976, was a landmark law in this regard in Michigan political history. Its name comes from the fact that lawmakers Daisy Elliott and Melvin L. Larsen introduced and spearheaded the act.

An amendment offered by Democrats would have required the proposal to state clearly that it would not interfere with the protections offered by Michigan's past civil rights acts. That, along with other amendments, failed. Varying opinions exist as to if the proposal would give an out to those anti-discrimination laws.

However, no statewide protections for LGBT people in analogous circumstances exist, so discrimination against those individuals have frequently happened with no legal repercussions. Thus, the proposal would essentially ratify the circumstances already in place, shielding individuals wishing to discriminate from possible future measures.

== Debates ==
The proposal has generally resulted in an acrimonious partisan debate over its merits as well as the motivations for its creation, with many discussions by lawmakers in the state. As stated before, several organizations such as the Michigan Civil Rights Commission have viewed the proposal as a setback to the cause of expanding civil rights. Groups stating their support include the Michigan Catholic Conference, the organizations arguing that the ability to discriminate can come from deeply held moral viewpoints that should be respected.

== See also ==
- LGBT rights in Michigan
- Politics of Michigan
