= Area code 586 =

Telephone area code for Macomb County, Michigan

Coordinates: 42.6°N 83.0°W

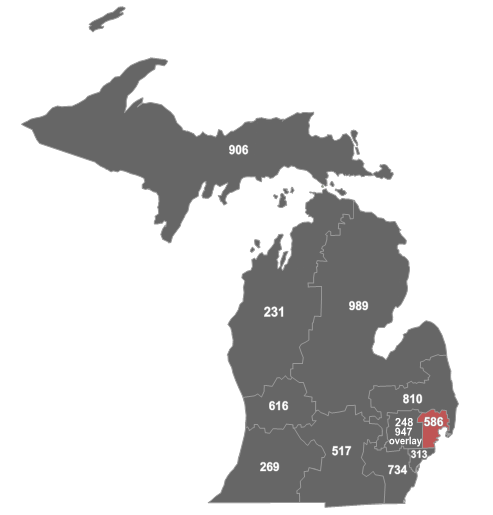
Map highlighting area code 586 in Michigan

Area code 586 is the telephone area code serving much of Macomb County, Michigan, introduced in 2001 as a split from area code 810. Its territory was originally part of area code 313.

== History ==
Macomb County was originally served by Detroit's area code 313, one of the original 86 area codes in the North American Numbering Plan. In 1993, area code 810 was split from 313; the service area of 810 initially included all of the former 313 outside of Monroe, Wayne, and Washtenaw counties.

In 1997, Oakland County, bordering Macomb County to the west, was split from area code 810 as area code 248. Area code 586 was first proposed as an overlay for the 810 territory, to be implemented in 2000. However, overlays were still a new concept at this time, and met with some resistance due to the need for ten-digit dialing. In the face of intense opposition to the overlay proposal, 586 was instead implemented as a split, with most of Macomb County getting the new area code. The area code was introduced on September 22, 2001. Permissive dialing of 810 continued until March 23, 2002.

== Service area ==
Area code 586 serves Macomb County, Michigan, including the following communities:

- Armada, Michigan
- Center Line, Michigan
- Chesterfield Township, Michigan
- Clinton Charter Township, Michigan
- Eastpointe, Michigan
- Fraser, Michigan
- Harrison Township, Michigan
- Lenox Township, Michigan
- Macomb Township, Michigan
- Memphis, Michigan (part by 810)
- Mount Clemens, Michigan
- New Baltimore, Michigan
- New Haven, Michigan
- Ray Township, Michigan
- Richmond, Michigan
- Romeo, Michigan
- Roseville, Michigan
- Saint Clair Shores, Michigan
- Shelby Charter Township, Michigan (very small part by 248)
- Sterling Heights, Michigan
- Utica, Michigan
- Warren, Michigan
- Washington Township, Macomb County, Michigan (part by 248)

Michigan area codes: 231, 248/947, 269, 313/679, 517, 586, 616, 734, 810, 906, 989
	North: 810	
West: 248/947	586	East: 810, 519/226/548/382
	South: 313	
Ontario area codes: 416/437/647/942, 519/226/548/382, 613/343/753, 705/249/683, 807, 905/289/365/742
