= Michigan Schools and Government Credit Union =

- Company type: Credit union
- Industry: Financial services
- Founded: 1954
- Headquarters: Clinton Township, Michigan, US
- Number of locations: 22 full-service branches; 5,600+ Service Centers nationwide
- Products: Savings; checking; consumer loans; mortgages; credit cards; investments; online banking
- Total assets: $3.7 billion USD
- Website: msgcu.org

The Michigan Schools and Government Credit Union (MSGCU) is headquartered in Clinton Township, Michigan, and has a membership size of more than 137,000 and assets of over $3.7 billion. MSGCU was founded in 1954 and is a not-for-profit financial institution, which is owned and operated by its members. The credit union is regulated under the authority of the National Credit Union Administration (NCUA), which means its members' deposits are federally insured up to $250,000. Michigan Schools and Government Credit Union currently has 22 branches located throughout Macomb, Oakland, Wayne, and Washtenaw counties. It also belongs to the CO-OP Network of ATMs and Credit Union Service Centers. This network allows members to utilize more than 30,000 surcharge-free ATMs and 5,600 Service Centers nationwide.

== Membership ==
MSGCU is open to all who reside, are employed, worship, or attend an educational institution in any county within the State of Michigan.

== Awards ==
The youth and adult financial education programs offered at MSGCU have received the Michigan Credit Union League's (MCUL) Desjardins Financial Education Award numerous times. Additionally, the MCUL has also awarded the credit union with the Louise Herring Award and Dora Maxwell Award for various member and community service efforts throughout the years.

Bauer Financial , which provides independent bank and credit union star-ratings, has consistently awarded MSGCU with its highest rating, five-stars, for financial institutions. MSGCU also has high member satisfaction and retention. For the past 20 years, MSGCU has received an average 97% member satisfaction rating during an independent survey.

MSGCU was awarded a 2023 Top Workplaces honor by The Detroit Free Press for the 11th year in a row. The Top Workplaces lists are based solely on the results of an employee feedback survey administered by Energage, LLC (formerly Workplace Dynamics), a leading research firm that specializes in organizational health and workplace improvement. Several aspects of workplace culture were measured, including Alignment, Execution, and Connection.
