= List of Michigan state symbols =

Location of the state of Michigan in the United States

The following is a list of symbols of the U.S. state of Michigan. Bills to designate state symbols in Michigan are referred to the Government Operations Committee in either chamber.

== State symbols ==
Type	Symbol	Adopted	Image	Note
Bird	American robin Turdus migratorius	1931	American Robin	
Coat of Arms	Coat of Arms of the State of Michigan	1835	The Coat of Arms of the State of Michigan	
Duck	Wood duck Aix sponsa	2026		
Fish	Brook Trout; Salvelinus fontinalis	1988	Brook trout	In 1965, the trout was named the official state fish; this was specified as the brook trout in 1988.
Flag	Flag of the State of Michigan	1911	The Flag of the State of Michigan	
Flower	Apple Blossom (Note: The legislation mentions sweet crabapple (Malus coronaria) as an example.); Malus sp.	1897	Sweet crabapple blossom	A garland of 44 flowers representing the 44 states was made for the World's Columbian Exhibition of 1893 with the Apple Blossom representing Michigan. This inspired Michigan's Legislature to make it official in 1897.
Fossil	Mastodon; Mammut americanum	2002	Mastodon	
Game Mammal	White-Tailed Deer; Odocoileus virginianus	1997	White-tailed deer	
Gem	Isle Royale greenstone Chlorastrolite	1972	Isle Royale greenstone	
Motto	Si quaeris peninsulam amoenam circumspice (Latin for "If you seek a pleasant peninsula, look about you")	1835		
Native Grain	Manoomin; Zizania palustris and Zizania aquatica	2023	Manoomin	
Reptile	Painted turtle Chrysemys picta	1995	Painted turtle	
Seal	Great Seal of the State of Michigan	1835	The Great Seal of the State of Michigan	
Soil	Kalkaska soil series	December 1990		
Song	"My Michigan"	1937		The resolution passed by the Michigan House of Representatives specified "My Michigan" as "the official state song," but this was changed upon introduction in the state senate to "an official song." Because the state failed to purchase the copyright from the song's authors, the song is rarely performed today.
Stone	Petoskey Stone; Hexagonaria pericarnata	1965	Petoskey Stone	
Tree	Eastern White Pine; Pinus strobus	1955	Eastern White Pine	
Wildflower	Dwarf Lake Iris; Iris lacustris	1998	Dwarf Lake Iris	

=== Other symbols ===
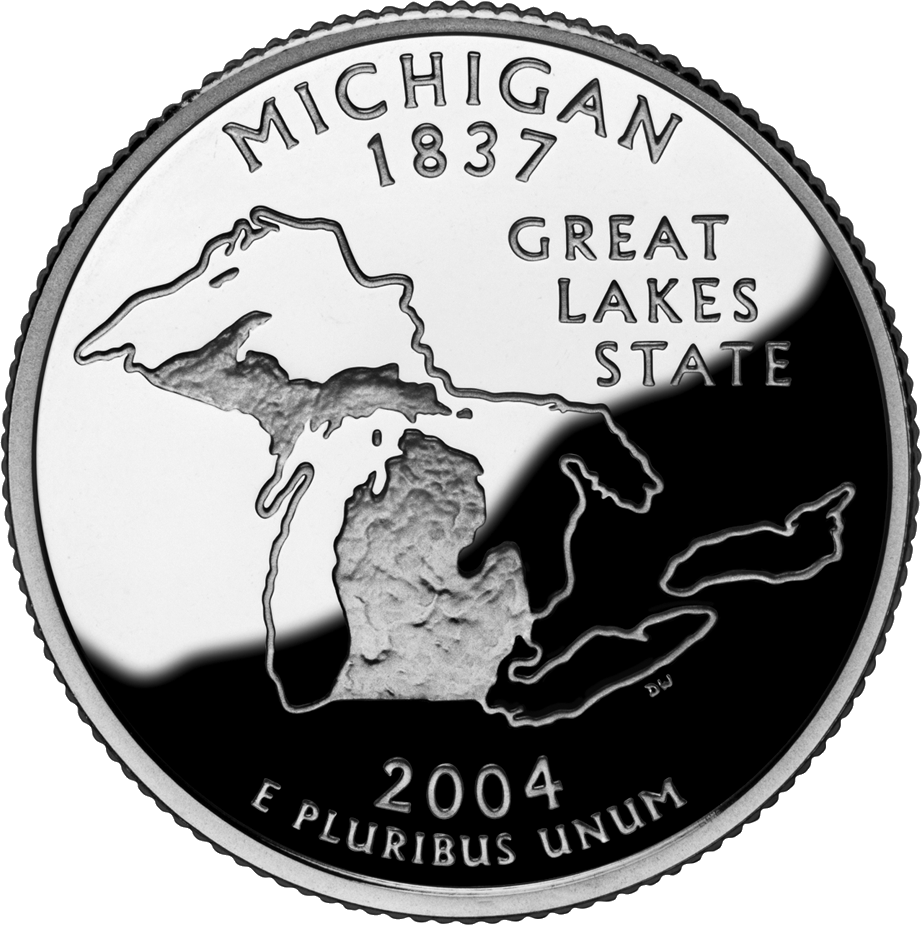
- United States quarter dollar - Michigan 2004

== See also ==
- List of U.S. state, district, and territorial insignia
- Outline of Michigan
