= List of Michigan weather records =

These are the extremes in weather records for Michigan, a state in the Great Lakes region of the Midwestern United States.

== Temperature ==
=== Overall ===
The state record low is −51 °F (−46 °C), recorded at Vanderbilt on February 9, 1934, while the state record high is 112 °F (44 °C), recorded at Mio on July 13, 1936.

=== Heat wave ===
Event	Count	Date	Location
Most heat wave deaths	570	July 8–14, 1936	Statewide

== Precipitation ==
=== Rain ===
Event	Measurement	Date	Location
Greatest 24-Hour rainfall	12.92 inches (328 mm)	July 20, 2019	Walhalla

=== Snow ===
Event	Measurement	Date	Location
Greatest 24-hour snowfall	38.0 inches (97 cm)	December 26, 2022	Kearsarge
Greatest snow depth	117.0 inches (297 cm)	January 27–31, 1948	Eagle Harbor

== Tornadoes ==
Event		Date	Location	Ref
Most in one day	19	May 21, 2001	Statewide	
Most fatalities, one day	125	June 8, 1953	Statewide	
Most fatalities single tornado	116	June 8, 1953	Genesee County, Lapeer County	
