= Electoral reform in Michigan =

Political movement in the United States

Electoral reform in Michigan refers to efforts, proposals and plans to change the election and voting laws of Michigan. In 2021, a Sixth Court panel held that ballot access laws in Michigan curtail independents, as they required a political party to submit 38,024 signatures, including 100 signatures from half of all Michigan Congressional districts. The Michigan Third Parties Coalition has sought to relax those requirements. In 2023, legislation was introduced in the Michigan Legislature for the state to join the National Popular Vote Interstate Compact.

== Voting systems ==
Michigan uses first-past-the-post voting to elect the governor, state legislators, and members of Congress. However, attempts have been made to introduce preferential voting systems. In 2004, Ferndale residents approved Proposal B, implementing instant-runoff voting for the city mayor and council members.

In 2023, ballot initiatives sought wider use of instant-runoff voting.

== Proposal 2 ==
In 2023, Gretchen Whitmer signed into law 2022 Michigan Proposal 2, commonly referred to as 'Prop 2', which aimed to expand voting rights in Michigan. The new laws include nine days of early voting, prepaid postage for absentee ballots, an updated ballot tracking system, and acceptance of more ID types for voting.
