= List of Michigan state forests =

Michigan State Forests Map

The following is a list of state forests in the U.S. state of Michigan. The Michigan Department of Natural Resources manages the largest state forest system in the nation (2.8 million acres (16,000 km^{2})), administered by the Forest Resources Division.

In literature describing recreational uses of state forest lands, six state forests are identified. However, state forest lands are administered by fifteen DNR Forest Management Units (FMU). There is no state forest land in the southern portion of the Lower Peninsula.

== Upper Peninsula ==
- Copper Country State Forest
  - Baraga FMU (Baraga, Gogebic, Houghton, Keweenaw, and Ontonagon counties)
  - Crystal Falls FMU (Dickinson and Iron counties)
- Escanaba River State Forest
  - Escanaba FMU (most of Delta and Menominee counties)
  - Gwinn FMU (west Alger and Marquette counties)
- Lake Superior State Forest
  - Newberry FMU (Luce and northwest Chippewa counties)
  - Sault Ste. Marie FMU (southeast Chippewa and Mackinac counties)
  - Shingleton FMU (east Alger, southeast Delta, Schoolcraft counties)

== Northern Lower Peninsula ==
- Mackinaw State Forest
  - Atlanta FMU (Alpena, northeast Cheboygan, most of Montmorency, and most of Presque Isle counties)
  - Gaylord FMU (Antrim, Charlevoix, most of Cheboygan, Emmet, and most of Otsego counties)
  - Pigeon River Country FMU (southeast Cheboygan, northwest Montmorency, northeast Otsego, and southwest Presque Isle counties)
- Pere Marquette State Forest
  - Cadillac FMU (Lake, Mason, Mecosta, Missaukee, Newaygo, Oceana, Osceola, and Wexford counties)
  - Traverse City FMU (Benzie, Grand Traverse, Leelanau, Kalkaska, Manistee counties)
- Au Sable State Forest
  - Gladwin FMU (Arenac, Bay, Clare, Gladwin, southern Iosco, Isabella, and Midland counties)
  - Grayling FMU (Alcona, Crawford, Oscoda, and northern Iosco counties)
  - Roscommon FMU (Ogemaw and Roscommon counties)

== See also ==
- List of national forests of the United States
