= Seal of Michigan =

Official government emblem of the U.S. state of Michigan

Great Seal of the State of Michigan
- Armiger: State of Michigan
- Adopted: July 22, 1835 (standardized 1911)
- Motto: E Pluribus Unum; Tuebor; Si Quæris Peninsulam Amœnam Circumspice

The Great Seal of the State of Michigan depicts the coat of arms of the U.S. state of Michigan on a light blue field. On the dark blue shield the Sun rises over a lake and peninsula, a man with a raised hand in peace and his other hand holding a long gun, representing a readiness to defend the state and nation. The elk and moose are symbols of Michigan, while the bald eagle represents the United States.

The design features three Latin mottos. From top to bottom they are:

1. On the red ribbon: E Pluribus Unum, "Out of many, one", a motto of the United States
2. On the blue shield: Tuebor, "I will defend", meant to emphasize Michigan's being located at a national boundary
3. On the white ribbon: Si Quæris Peninsulam Amœnam Circumspice, "If you seek a pleasant peninsula, look about you", which is the official state motto. It was adopted in 1835 and is said to have been suggested by the tribute to architect Christopher Wren at Saint Paul's Cathedral in London, which reads Si monumentum requiris, circumspice (Latin "If you seek [his] monument, look around you").

This seal was adopted in the year of 1835, on June 22.

Public Act 19 of 1963 states that "The great seal shall be comprised of the coat of arms of the state around which shall appear the words 'great seal of the state of Michigan, A.D. MDCCCXXXV'."

== Coat of arms of Michigan ==
Coat of arms of the State of Michigan

Versions
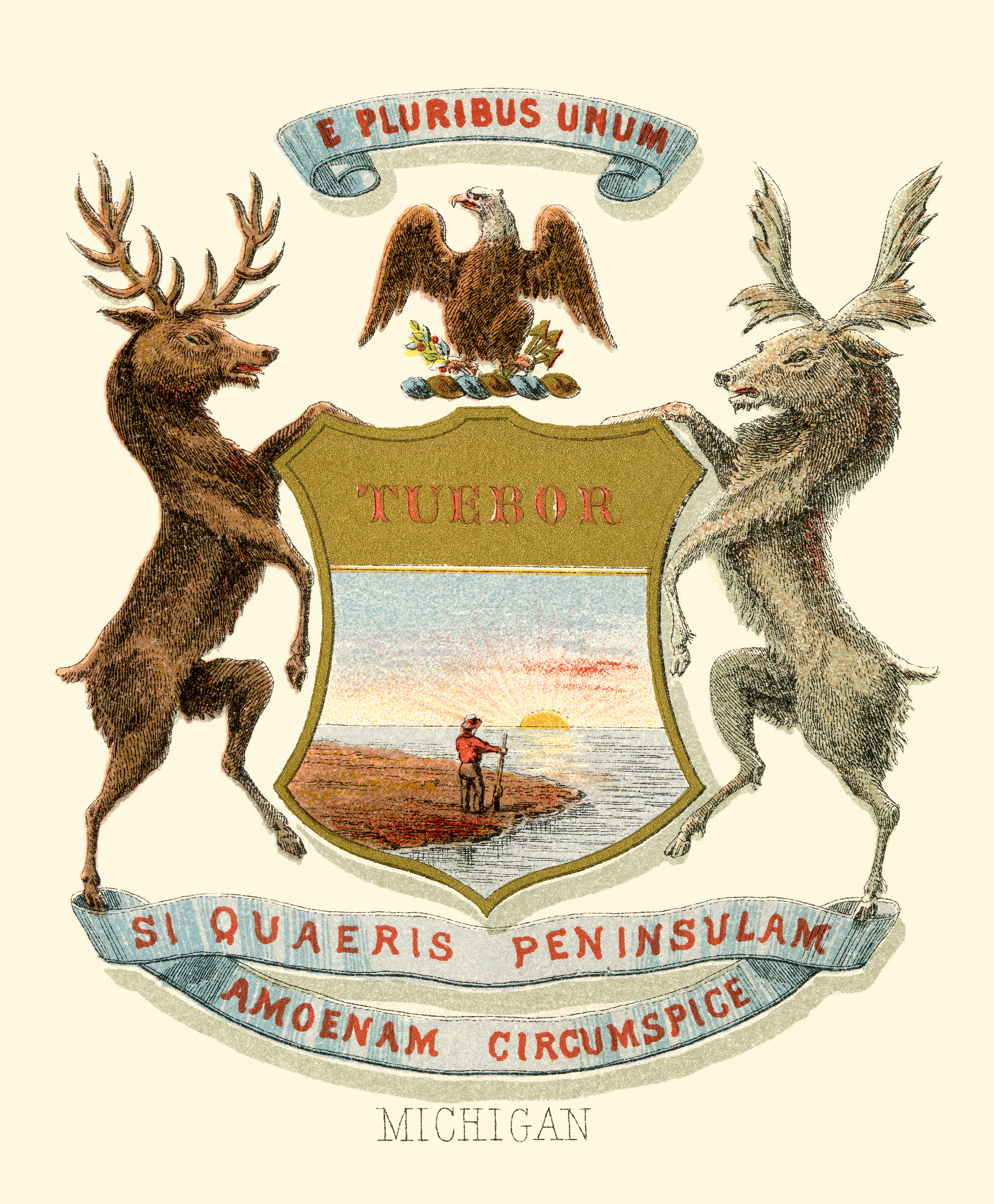
- Historical coat of arms (1876)
- Armiger: State of Michigan
- Adopted: June 22, 1835 (standardized 1911)
- Motto: E Pluribus Unum; Tuebor; Si Quæris Peninsulam Amœnam Circumspice

Legally distinct from, but adopted simultaneously alongside the Great Seal in 1835, is the coat of arms of Michigan. The coat of arms was re-asserted and its blazon defined by the Legislature in Act 209 of 1911 (MCL 2.21–22). It is identical to the Great Seal of Michigan with the legend or circle, "The Great Seal of the State of Michigan, A.D. MDCCCXXXV", omitted. Unlike the Great Seal, the coat of arms may be printed on documents, stationery, or ornaments with no design or words and disconnected with any advertisement (MCL 750.247). However, a person who improperly exhibits and displays the coat of arms is guilty of a misdemeanor (MCL 750.245).

== Government seals of Michigan ==
Seal of the governor of Michigan

Seal of the secretary of state of Michigan

Seal of the attorney general of Michigan

Seal of the treasurer of Michigan

== See also ==
- Flag of Michigan
- List of Michigan state symbols
