= List of sister cities in Michigan =

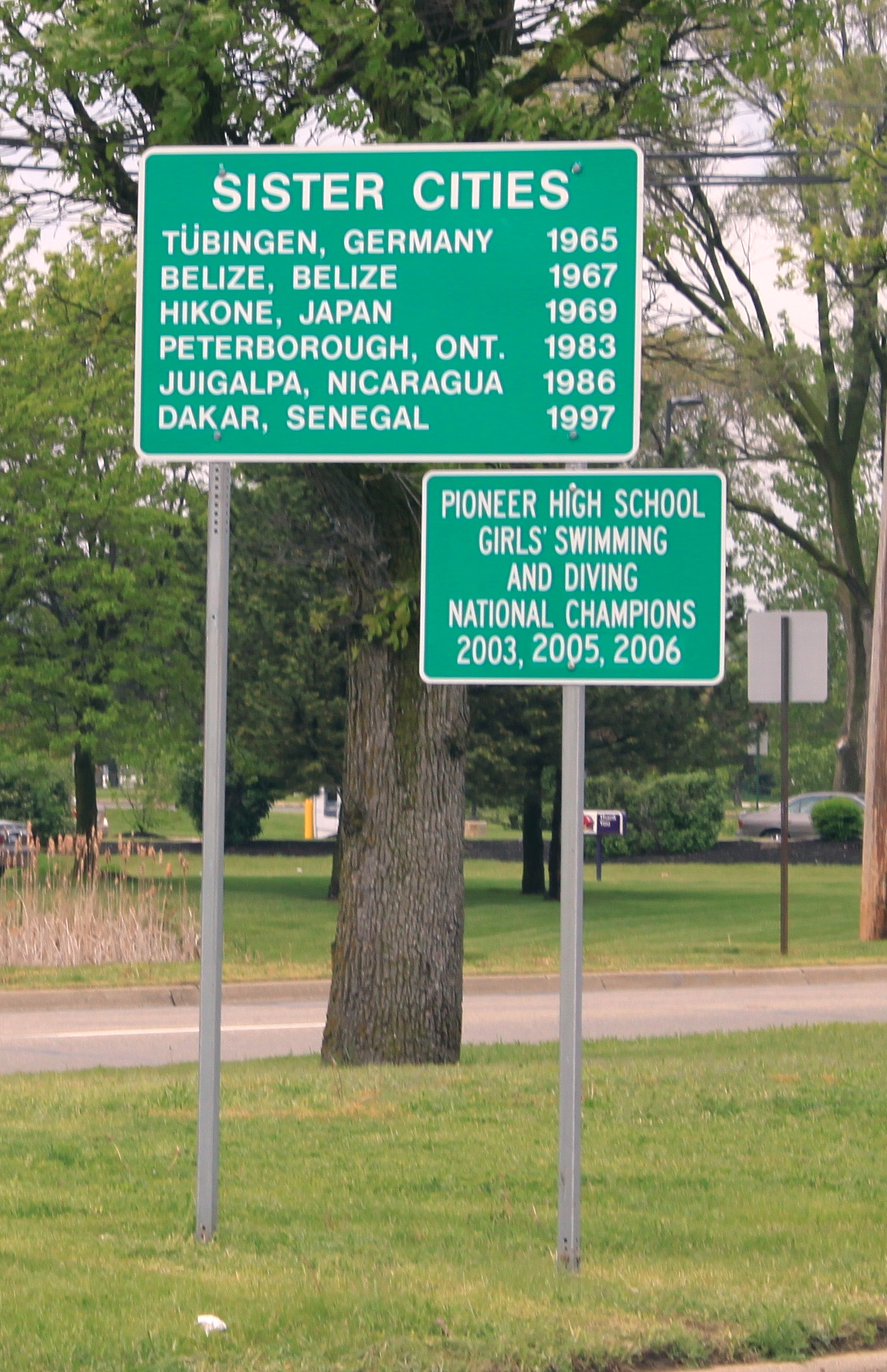
A sign with sister cities of Ann Arbor in 2010

This is a list of sister cities in the United States state of Michigan. Sister cities, known in Europe as twin towns, are cities which partner with each other to promote human contact and cultural links, although this partnering is not limited to cities and often includes counties, regions, states and other sub-national entities.

Many Michigan jurisdictions work with foreign cities through Sister Cities International, an organization whose goal is to "promote peace through mutual respect, understanding, and cooperation."

== A ==
Adrian

- Moriyama, Japan

Albion

- Noisy-le-Roi, France

Ann Arbor

- Belize City, Belize
- Dakar, Senegal
- Hikone, Japan
- Juigalpa, Nicaragua
- Lubny, Ukraine
- Peterborough, Canada
- Remedios, Cuba
- Tübingen, Germany

Auburn Hills

- Saltillo, Mexico

== B ==
Battle Creek

- Takasaki, Japan

Bay City

- Ansbach, Germany
- Goderich, Canada

Belleville

- Machynlleth, Wales, United Kingdom

Birmingham

- Rittō, Japan

== C ==
Cadillac

- Rovaniemi, Finland

Chelsea

- Shimizu, Japan

Clinton Township

- Yasu, Japan

Coldwater

- Soltau, Germany

== D ==
Dearborn

- Qana, Lebanon

Detroit

- Chongqing, China
- Dubai, United Arab Emirates
- Kitwe, Zambia
- Minsk, Belarus
- (The Bahamas) Nassau, Bahamas
- Toyota, Japan
- Turin, Italy

DeWitt

- Kōka, Japan

Dundee

- Tsubame, Japan

== E ==
East Lansing

- Cluj-Napoca, Romania

== F ==
Flint

- Hamilton, Canada
- Poltava, Ukraine
- Tolyatti, Russia

Frankenmuth

- Gunzenhausen, Germany

Fremont

- Yahaba, Japan

== G ==
Gaylord

- Pontresina, Switzerland

Grand Rapids

- Bielsko-Biała, Poland
- Ga East District, Ghana
- Ga West District, Ghana
- Gangnam (Seoul), South Korea
- Ōmihachiman, Japan
- Perugia, Italy
- Zapopan, Mexico

== H ==
Hancock

- Porvoo, Finland

Holland

- Querétaro, Mexico

== J ==
Jackson

- Carrickfergus, Northern Ireland, United Kingdom

== K ==
Kalamazoo

- Kingston, Jamaica
- Numazu, Japan
- Pushkin, Russia

== L ==
Lansing

- Akuapim South District, Ghana
- Asan, South Korea
- Guadalajara, Mexico
- Ōtsu, Japan
- Pianezza, Italy
- Saltillo, Mexico
- Sanming, China

== M ==
Mackinac Island

- Lybster, Scotland, United Kingdom

Marquette

- Higashiōmi, Japan
- Kajaani, Finland

Marshall

- Kōka, Japan

Mason

- Viti, Kosovo

Midland

- Handa, Japan

Monroe

- Hōfu, Japan

Mount Pleasant

- Okaya, Japan

Muskegon

- Hartlepool, England, United Kingdom
- Ōmuta, Japan

== P ==
Petoskey

- Takashima, Japan

Pontiac

- Kusatsu, Japan

Port Huron

- Chiquimula, Guatemala

== R ==
Redford

- Gau-Algesheim, Germany
- Sankt Johann in Tirol, Austria

Rochester Hills

- Tuzi, Montenegro

== S ==
Saginaw

- Amanokrom, Ghana
- Barrie, Canada
- Tokushima, Japan
- Zapopan, Mexico

Saline

- Brecon, Wales, United Kingdom
- Lindenberg im Allgäu, Germany

Sault Ste. Marie

- Sault Ste. Marie, Canada

South Haven

- Quilalí, Nicaragua

Southfield

- Dongducheon, South Korea

Sterling Heights

- Ankawa, Iraq
- Cassino, Italy
- Jaffna, Sri Lanka
- Legazpi, Philippines
- Sant'Elia Fiumerapido, Italy
- Shëngjin (Lezhë), Albania
- Sorsogon City, Philippines
- Tetovo, North Macedonia

Sturgis

- Wiesloch, Germany

== T ==
Tecumseh

- Tecumseh, Canada
- La Verpillière, France

Traverse City

- Kōka, Japan

Troy

- Aley, Lebanon

== W ==
Walker

- Colac Otway, Australia

Wyandotte

- Komaki, Japan
