= Water in Michigan =

Water supply and distribution in the U.S. state of Michigan

Map of Michigan rivers

Michigan has about 242 streams (rivers and creeks) with a combined length of 36,350 miles (58,500 km) and about 11,000 lakes and ponds. Michigan borders four of the five Great Lakes and is a signatory to the Great Lakes Compact. The Michigan Department of Environmental Quality is responsible for the management of Michigan's water resources.

== Sources of water ==
=== Groundwater ===
The state is divided into 12 hydrologic provinces based on geology, aquifer recharge rates and water quality. Bedrock aquifers provide potable water in five provinces. Glacial-deposit aquifers provide potable water in three provinces. Four provinces have a problem with low water quantity or quality.

=== Surface water ===
Runoff from rain and snow melt provide the water for rivers and creeks. The water then flows into the Great Lakes.

== Uses of water ==
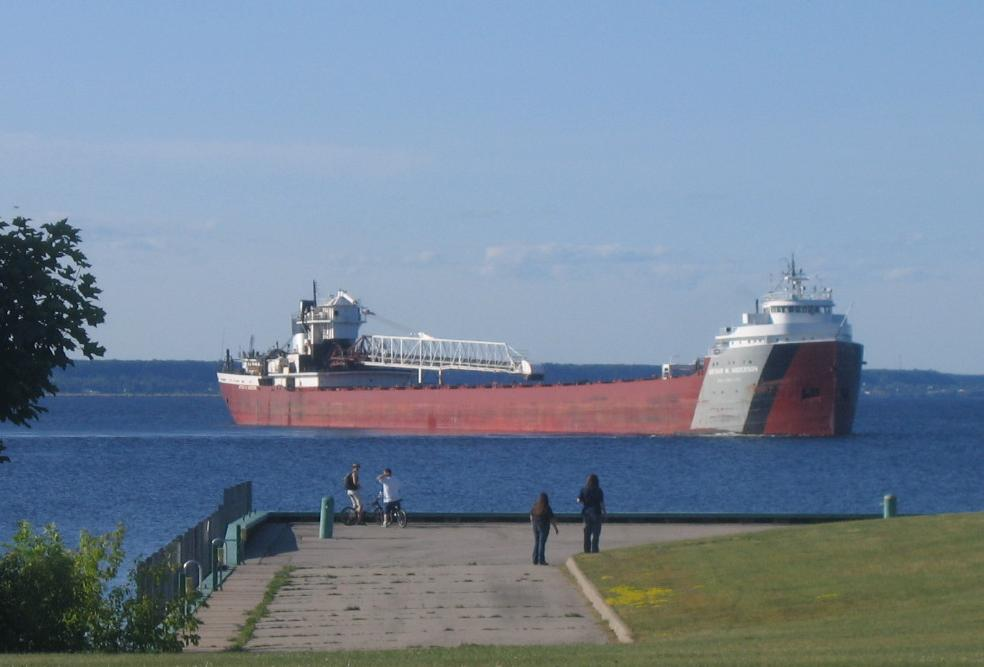
SS Arthur M. Anderson

=== Commercial ===
The Great Lakes are used to ship iron ore, coal, limestone, and cement to and/or from ports in Michigan.

Energy generation is a large user of water. From damming rivers to generate electricity, to power plant cooling, to the Ludington Pumped Storage Power Plant.

Irrigation and industrial uses also account for water usage.

Bottled water such as BlueTriton Brands Ice Mountain is extracted and bottled in Michigan.

=== Municipal ===
Municipal water systems withdraw water from surface water of the Great Lakes and ground water aquifers.

=== Recreational ===
Michigan has almost 1,200 public and private beaches on lakes and rivers.

The Michigan Department of Natural Resources operates six fish hatcheries and stocks game fish in many lakes and rivers.

The state has over 1,300 boating access sites and over 80 harbors and marinas operated by various government entities.

== Protected areas ==
Michigan owns all rivers and lakes not surrounded by a sole owner. It has regulations governing structure placement and remedial actions such as chemical treatments to remove plants.

Michigan is home to three wetland habitat National Wildlife Refuges: Seney, Shiawassee, Detroit River International.

Michigan has 16 Federal Wild and Scenic Rivers and 16 State Natural Rivers. Three rivers are on both lists: Au Sable, Pere Marquette, Pine.

Wetlands, commonly known as bogs, swamps, or marshes, are protected. Michigan requires a permit to disturb a wetland and requires mitigation if a wetland will be destroyed. Mitigation requires the creation of a new wetland of 1.5 times or more the size of the destroyed wetland depending on the importance of the wetland.

Michigan has 13 Underwater Preserves to protect shipwrecks and natural features.

== Flora and fauna ==
=== Endangered species ===
The following clams found in Michigan are listed as endangered: clubshell pearly mussel, northern riffleshell, Snuffbox mussel.

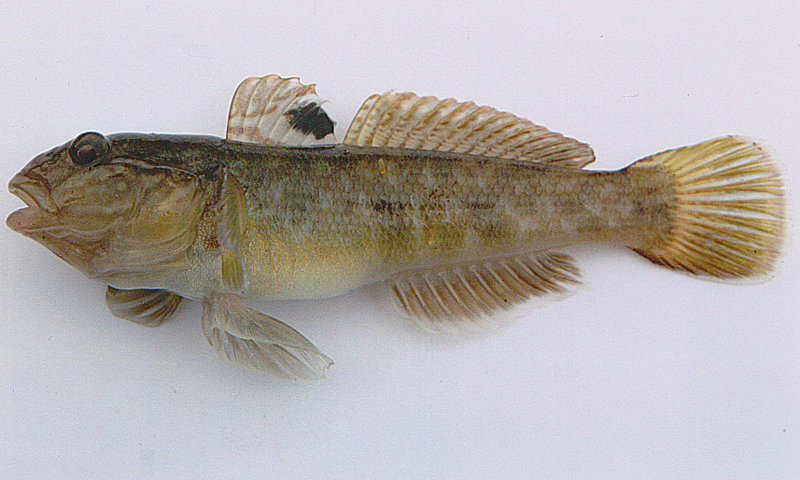
Round goby

=== Invasive species ===
The Great Lakes have been impaired by invasive species such as the sea lamprey, zebra mussel, quagga mussel, alewife, round goby, and Eurasian milfoil. Asian carp are a threat to enter the Great Lakes. The opening of the Welland Canal allowed the sea lamprey and alewife to bypass the natural barrier of Niagara Falls. Quagga, zebra mussels, and round gobies arrived in the ballast water of ocean-going ships that originated in Europe and Asia and discharged the water in the Great Lakes. Eurasian milfoil was intentionally introduced as an aquatic ornamental plant.

== Pollution ==
Michigan has banned phosphorus in detergents and lawn fertilizers due to it causing algae growth.

Pharmaceuticals have been detected in Great Lakes water tests. The effects on wildlife are in the early stages of study. Endocrine disruptors have been linked to altered reproductive organs in fish.

Some municipalities in Michigan have a combined sewer for both sewage and storm water. Heavy rains can overwhelm sewage treatment plants and allow partially treated or diluted sewage to enter waterways. The state has schedules with these municipalities to eliminate or mitigate the overflows.

As of March 2015, the Michigan legislature is considering legislation to ban the sale of products containing microbeads. The beads have been detected in the aquatic food chain because they look like food to animals.

In July 2010, an oil pipeline burst resulting in the Kalamazoo River oil spill.

The Tittabawassee River, Saginaw River, and Saginaw Bay have been designated a Superfund site by the EPA due to dioxin contamination from a Dow Chemical Company plant.

Mercury in the environment accumulates in the tissues of certain fish and makes them unsafe for human consumption, particularly for unborn and young children.

== See also ==
- List of lakes in Michigan
- List of rivers of Michigan
