= Michigan Public Transit Association =

The Michigan Public Transit Association (MPTA) is a non-profit statewide association incorporated in 1977 under Section 501(c)6 of the Internal Revenue Code. First organized in 1974, the membership ranges from the largest urban public transit system providers in Michigan to a majority of the smaller rural demand-response systems. Geographically, MPTA membership is distributed throughout the state, from southeast Michigan to the westernmost point of the Upper Peninsula.

MPTA offices have been located in East Lansing since October, 1999, close to Michigan State University and nearby the State Capitol. Much of MPTA's advocacy involves working closely with Michigan's Executive and Legislative branches and the Michigan Department of Transportation.
