= Area code 231 =

Area code in Michigan, United States

Coordinates: 44.5°N 85.5°W

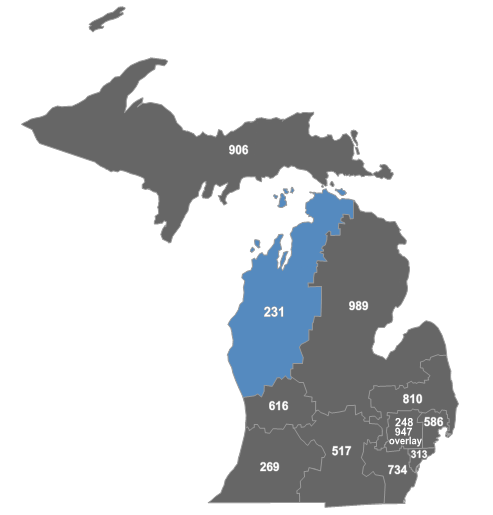
Map of area code 231 in Michigan.

Area code 231 is a telephone area code in the North American Numbering Plan (NANP) for the northwestern portion of the Lower Peninsula in the U.S. state of Michigan.

== History ==
Area code 231 was created in June 1999 by an area code split of area code 616, which had served the entire western half of the Lower Peninsula, extending west from the north-south line aligned with the Mackinac Bridge. 231 was carved out of the northern part. It is centered around the western half of the territory generally defined as Northern Michigan. It also includes Muskegon, which is almost universally counted as part of West Michigan.

== Service area ==
The numbering plan area includes the following communities:

- Big Rapids
- Boyne City
- Cadillac
- Charlevoix
- Cheboygan
- East Jordan
- Elk Rapids
- Harbor Springs
- Hart
- Kalkaska
- Kingsley
- Lake City
- Ludington
- Mackinaw City
- Manistee
- Muskegon
- Newaygo
- Norton Shores
- Petoskey
- Traverse City

Michigan area codes: 231, 248/947, 269, 313/679, 517, 586, 616, 734, 810, 906, 989
	North: 906	
West: Lake Michigan	231	East: 989
	South: 616	
