= Southern Michigan =

Region of Michigan, United States

Coordinates: 42°45′N 84°30′W

- Region
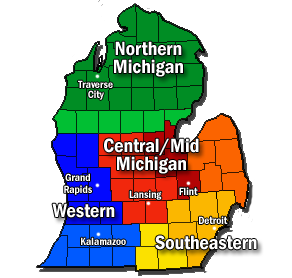
- Southern Michigan is located between the Western and Southeastern regions of Michigan.
- Interactive map of Southern Michigan
- Location: Michigan, United States

Southern Michigan is a loosely defined geographic area of the U.S. state of Michigan. Southern Michigan may be referred to as a sub-region or component area to other regions of the Lower Peninsula of Michigan. It is an area of rolling farmland, including the Irish Hills. It is usually defined as anywhere less than approximately 45-50 miles North of the Ohio/Indiana border, it can also be defined as the bottom two rows of counties of Michigan, meaning any county which borders Ohio or Indiana and the county just north of that. The region shares a state border with Indiana and Ohio. However the actual line is somewhat disputed.

== Definitions ==
Depending on the viewer's perspective, the area known as Southern Michigan can fall into three well defined and larger regions of the state:

- Central Michigan the Greater Lansing and the Flint and Tri-Cities area.
- West Michigan the area surrounding Kalamazoo and Battle Creek, which share similarities with other cities in Michiana and on the Lake Michigan shore.
- Southeast Michigan includes Metro Detroit and outlying cities such as Ann Arbor, Adrian, and Jackson, though Jackson is normally included in "South-Central Lower Michigan" or "Mid-Michigan".

== See also ==
- List of counties in Michigan
- Mid or Central Michigan
- West Michigan
- Southeastern Michigan
- Lower Peninsula of Michigan
- Lansing metropolitan area
