= Area code 616 =

Area code for Western Michigan

Coordinates: 42.75°N 85.75°W

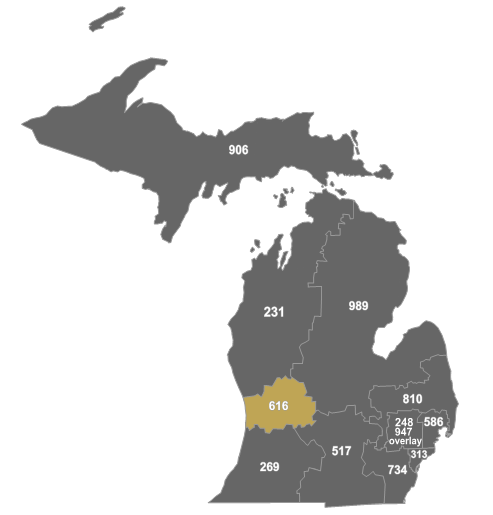
Map of area code 616 in Michigan.

Area code 616 is the telephone area code in the North American Numbering Plan (NANP) for Grand Rapids, Michigan and all or part of six surrounding counties. The numbering plan area comprises all of Kent and Ottawa counties, and parts of Allegan, Barry, Ionia, Montcalm and Muskegon counties. Besides Grand Rapids, it also serves the cities of Holland, Greenville, and Grand Haven. Area code 616 was one of the original North American area codes created in 1947.

== History ==
In 1947, the first nationwide telephone numbering plan divided Michigan into three numbering plan areas (NPAs). 616 was assigned to the western part, serving the western half of the Lower Peninsula plus all of the Upper Peninsula. It was by far the largest of Michigan's three numbering plan areas, covering as much territory as the other two, 313 and 517, combined. It was also the largest numbering plan area east of the Mississippi River that did not serve an entire state.

The dividing line between 616 and 517 ran from the far north shore on Lake Huron through the middle of the state south to the Indiana state line; everything west of that line was 616.

In 1961, the Upper Peninsula was split off with area code 906. This configuration remained in place for 38 years. In 1999, the northwestern Lower Peninsula, including Muskegon, Traverse City and Cadillac, became area code 231. As a result, 616 was now mostly coextensive with the core of West Michigan. While Muskegon is universally counted as part of West Michigan, it was now in 231. A sliver of Muskegon County near the village of Casnovia remained in 616; the village spills into Muskegon and Kent counties.

The 1999 split was intended to be a long-term solution for the region. However, within two years, the proliferation of cell phones and pagers brought 616 close to exhaustion. In 2002, the lower third of the old 616 territory, including Kalamazoo and Battle Creek, was split off and assigned area code 269, leaving the present area. A sliver of Allegan County near Holland remained in 616; that city spills into Ottawa and Allegan counties.

Prior to October 2021, area code 616 had telephone numbers assigned for the central office code 988. In 2020, 988 was designated nationwide as a dialing code for the National Suicide Prevention Lifeline, which created a conflict for exchanges that permit seven-digit dialing. This area code was therefore scheduled to transition to ten-digit dialing by October 24, 2021.

Michigan area codes: 231, 248/947, 269, 313/679, 517, 586, 616, 734, 810, 906, 989
	North: 231	
West: Lake Michigan, 262, 414	616	East: 517, 989
	South: 269	
