= Area codes 248 and 947 =

Telephone area codes for Oakland County, Michigan

Coordinates: 42.6°N 83.3°W

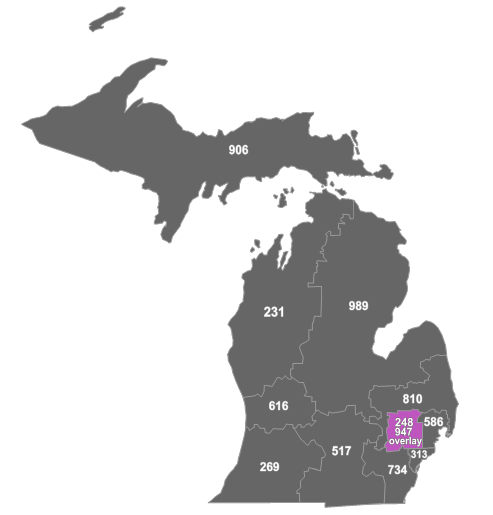
Map of area codes 248 and 947 in Michigan.

Area codes 248 and 947 are area codes in the North American Numbering Plan (NANP) for Oakland County in the U.S. state of Michigan. The area codes also serve portions of Livonia and Northville, both located in Wayne County. The rest of Wayne County, including Detroit, located to the southeast, is serviced by area codes 313 and 734.

Area code 248 was created in 1997 in a split of area code 810. In 2000, area code 947 was assigned as an overlay area code for the area in relief of central office code exhaustion. In 2001, it was approved as an all-services overlay plan in the 248 numbering plan area, requiring ten-digit dialing after end of the permissive dialing period, which started on January 26, 2002.

== Service area ==
The area codes serve the following major communities:

- Addison Township (shared with 586 and 810)
- Auburn Hills
- Berkley
- Birmingham
- Bloomfield Hills
- Bloomfield Township
- Brighton
- Clarkston
- Clawson
- Commerce Township
- Farmington Hills, Michigan
- Ferndale, Michigan
- Hazel Park, Michigan
- Holly, Michigan (part by 810)
- Huntington Woods, Michigan
- Lake Orion, Michigan area
- Leonard, Michigan (part by 810)
- Livonia, Michigan (most by 734, with a very small part by 248)
- Madison Heights, Michigan
- Milford, Michigan
- Northville, Michigan (part)
- Novi, Michigan
- Oakland Township, Michigan
- Oak Park, Michigan
- Ortonville, Michigan (part by 810)
- Oxford, Michigan (part by 810)
- Pontiac, Michigan
- Rochester, Michigan
- Rochester Hills, Michigan
- Royal Oak, Michigan
- Shelby Charter Township, Michigan (most by 586, with a very small part by 248)
- Southfield, Michigan
- South Lyon, Michigan
- Troy, Michigan
- Walled Lake, Michigan
- Waterford Township, Michigan area
- West Bloomfield Township, Michigan
- White Lake Township, Michigan area
- Wixom, Michigan

Michigan area codes: 231, 248/947, 269, 313/679, 517, 586, 616, 734, 810, 906, 989
	North: 810	
West: 810	248/947	East: 586
	South: 313, 734	
