= Area code 269 =

Telephone area code for southwestern Michigan

Coordinates: 42.25°N 85.50°W

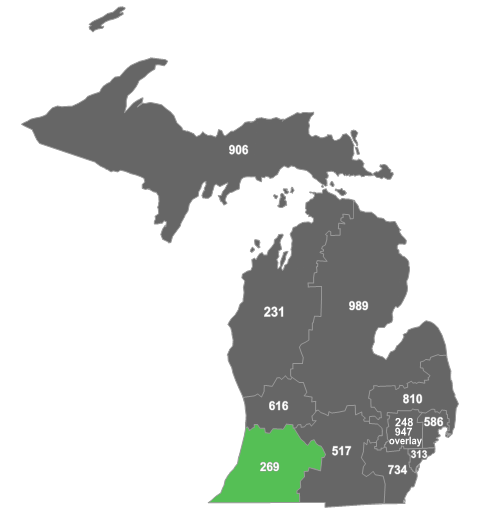
Map of area code 269 in Michigan.

Area code 269 is the telephone area code serving the southwest portion of Michigan's Lower Peninsula.

== History ==
269 was created as a split of area code 616 on July 13, 2002. The 269 area covers roughly the lower third of 616 before the split. Frontier and AT&T are the predominant local telephone carriers.

== Service area ==
Communities using 269 include Decatur, Dowagiac, Allegan, Battle Creek, Kalamazoo, Buchanan, Paw Paw, Portage, Otsego, Plainwell, St. Joseph, Benton Harbor, Marshall, Niles, Three Rivers, Sturgis, South Haven, Berrien Springs, Bridgman, and Wayland

== See also ==
- List of NANP area codes

Michigan area codes: 231, 248/947, 269, 313/679, 517, 586, 616, 734, 810, 906, 989
	North: 616	
West: Lake Michigan	area code 269	East: 517
	South: 219, 260, 574	
Indiana area codes: 219, 260, 317/463, 574, 765, 812/930
