= Area code 517 =

Area code in south-central Michigan

Coordinates: 42.25°N 84.5°W

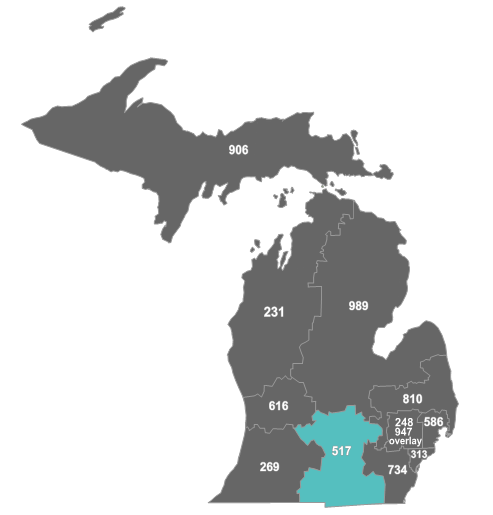
Map of area code 517 in Michigan.

Area code 517 is a telephone area code in the North American Numbering Plan (NANP) for the south central portion of the Lower Peninsula of Michigan, centered on the state capital, Lansing. Other notable cities in the service area are Charlotte, Mason, Eaton Rapids, East Lansing, Holt, Jackson, Albion, Howell, Coldwater, Adrian, Blissfield, and Hillsdale.

== History ==
Area code 517 was one of the original North American area codes created in 1947 for Operator Toll Dialing. Its numbering plan area initially consisted of the eastern half of the Lower Peninsula, outside the southeast (Metro Detroit and Flint), which was assigned area code 313. This included the city of Lansing, the Tri-Cities (Saginaw, Bay City and Midland) and much of Mid-Michigan, The service area was later expanded to include Jackson. It was one of the largest numbering plan areas east of the Mississippi River that did not comprise an entire state. It was separated from area code 616, which originally served the western Lower Peninsula and all of the Upper Peninsula, by a line running from the far north shore on Lake Huron through the middle of the state south to the Indiana state line; everything west of that line was in 616.

On April 7, 2001; the central and northern portions of the old 517 territory were reassigned with area code 989. Until then, despite the presence of Lansing and the Tri-Cities, 517 had been the only one of Michigan's original three area codes to have never been split, and one of the few remaining original area codes (not counting those serving an entire state) to have never been split or overlaid.

Michigan area codes: 231, 248/947, 269, 313/679, 517, 586, 616, 734, 810, 906, 989
	North: 989	
West: 269, 616	517	East: 734, 810
	South: 260, 419/567	
Indiana area codes: 219, 260, 317/463, 574, 765, 812/930
Ohio area codes: 216, 330/234, 419/567, 440/436, 513/283, 614/380, 740/220, 937/326
