= Area codes 270 and 364 =

North American area codes for western and south-central Kentucky

Kentucky's numbering plan areas

Area codes 270 and 364 are telephone overlay area codes in the North American Numbering Plan (NANP) for the Commonwealth of Kentucky's western and south central counties. Area code 270 was assigned in a split of numbering plan area 502 in 1999. Area code 364 was added to the same numbering plan area in 2014, after having been first considered for 270-relief planning in 2007. Major cities in the numbering plan area include Hopkinsville, Paducah, Henderson, Murray, Bowling Green, Owensboro, Elizabethtown, and Madisonville.

== History ==
When the American Telephone and Telegraph Company (AT&T) designed the first nationwide telephone numbering plan for Operator Toll Dialing in 1947, the entire state of Kentucky was designated as a single numbering plan area, and was assigned area code 502 as one of the 86 original North American area codes.

The eastern half of the state was assigned area code 606 in 1954, while the western half received area code 270 in 1999.

The split generally followed the boundary between the Eastern and Central time zones; generally, Kentucky's share of the Central Time Zone became 270.

The creation of 270 was intended as a long-term solution. However, within only six years, 270 was already close to exhaustion due to the proliferation of cell phones and pagers. In 2006, Kentucky officials announced that 270 would run out of numbers in late 2007. On May 31, 2007, the Kentucky Public Service Commission (PSC) announced that 270 would be split along the Pennyrile Parkway, with a newly created area code serving western Kentucky (Paducah, Hopkinsville, Henderson, Madisonville, Murray, and the Kentucky side of Fort Campbell), with west-central Kentucky (Bowling Green, Owensboro and Elizabethtown) retaining 270.

The PSC noted that mandatory number pooling, recently imposed on the region, may delay the implementation of the new code—and thus spare customers in the territory slated to move to 364 the expense and burden of having to change their numbers for the second time in a decade. Surprisingly, Kentucky's two most urbanized numbering plan areas, 502 (Louisville) and 859 (serving Lexington and Northern Kentucky), were not expected to exhaust until 2027 at the earliest, as they serve smaller areas with fewer rate centers.

On June 13, 2007, the PSC announced 364 as the new area code, and that the previously announced implementation would be delayed in favor of number conservation measures including expanded number pooling. On June 15, 2007, the PSC postponed the permissive dialing of the new 364 area code to October 1, 2008. Mandatory dialing to the new area code was changed as well, but the actual date was to be determined later by the PSC. On November 1, 2007, the PSC again postponed permissive dialing of the new 364 area code, this time to January 1, 2009. On March 31, 2008, the PSC again postponed permissive dialing of the new 364 area code, to April 1, 2010. A date for mandatory dialing to 364 was left undetermined.

On June 2, 2009, the PSC again postponed permissive dialing of the new 364 area code, to January 1, 2012. Mandatory dialing to 364 was still left undetermined. The split was suspended indefinitely on August 13, 2010, with no permissive dialing date. In December 2010, relief was suspended completely and was believed to be dead. These subsequent delays of relief action resulted from further implementation of number conservation measures, including mandatory and expanded number pooling, as well as a weakened economy and a reduced usage of telephone numbers dedicated for use by computer and fax modems.

On September 27, 2012, the PSC announced that all number conservation options had been exhausted, and the implementation of 364 could no longer be delayed. According to the PSC, NANPA projected the 270 region would exhaust by the first quarter of 2014. NANPA recommended that instead of the original proposal for a split, 364 should be implemented as an overlay for the 270 region. Under the NANPA proposal, existing 270 numbers would be retained by customers, but 10-digit dialing for local calls would be required across western Kentucky.

The PSC also considered an alternate proposal to split the 270 area code region. "Splitting the area code in two avoids ten-digit dialing but requires changing all current area code 270 numbers within the new area code to 364. That includes numbers assigned to wireless devices," said Andrew Melnykovych, Director of Communications for the PSC. The commission announced plans to hold public meetings throughout the 270 region the next month to explain the options and receive public comment. The commission also requested comments on the industry's overlay proposal for the 270 region up through November 16, 2012. On August 3, 2013, the permissive dialing period for the 364 area code commenced and ended on February 1, 2014. It eventually entered service on March 3, 2014, as an overlay instead of a split.

== See also ==
- List of Kentucky area codes
- List of North American Numbering Plan area codes

Kentucky area codes: 270/364, 502, 606, 859
	North: 618/730, 812/930, 502, 859	
West: 618/730, 573/235	270/364	East: 502, 606
	South: 731, 931, 615/629	
Missouri area codes: 314/557, 417, 573/235, 636, 660, 816/975
Illinois area codes: 217/447, 309/861, 312, 630/331, 618/730, 708/464, 773, 815/779, 847/224, 872
Indiana area codes: 219, 260, 317/463, 574, 765, 812/930
Tennessee area codes: 423, 615/629, 731, 865, 901, 931
