= Area code 319 =

Telephone area code in Iowa

Numbering plan areas of Iowa with the red area indicating area code 319

Area code 319 is a telephone area code in the North American Numbering Plan (NANP) for the southeastern and east-central parts of the U.S. state of Iowa.

Major cities in the numbering plan area (NPA) include Burlington, Cedar Falls, Cedar Rapids, Oelwein, Fort Madison, Iowa City, Keokuk, Mount Pleasant, and Waterloo.

When the first nationwide numbering plan was implemented in 1947, despite its relatively low population, Iowa was divided into three numbering plan areas (NPAs), with each border line running roughly in north–south directions.

Area code 319 was assigned to the eastern part, and stretched along the entire border with Wisconsin and Illinois. By the end of the 20th century, the available telephone number pool was depleting rapidly because of the increase in mobile devices, demand for telephone lines for computer equipment, FAX machines, and other services. In late 2000 it was announced that a new area code 563 would be assigned to northeastern Iowa. Cell phone service providers advocated an overlay plan, so that it would not require reconfiguration of all cell phones in the area.

However, overlays were still a relatively new concept at the time, and were met with considerable resistance due to the requirements for ten-digit dialing and mixing of area codes within the same area. In the end, the administrative decision was to implement a geographic split, in which the northeastern portion of the numbering plan area, including Bettendorf, Clinton, Davenport, Decorah, Dubuque and Eldridge, received area code 563. The new numbering plan configuration became operational in March 2001, and the new dialing procedures were mandatory as of December 2001.

Prior to October 2021, area code 319 had telephone numbers assigned for the central office code 988. In 2020, 988 was designated nationwide as a dialing code for the National Suicide Prevention Lifeline, which created a conflict for exchanges that permit seven-digit dialing. This area code was therefore scheduled to transition to ten-digit dialing by October 24, 2021.

== See also ==
- List of Iowa area codes

Iowa area codes: 319, 515, 563, 641, 712
	North: 563, 641	
West: 641	area code 319	East: 217/447, 309/861, 563
	South: 217/447, 660	
Illinois area codes: 217/447, 309/861, 312, 630/331, 618/730, 708/464, 773, 815/779, 847/224, 872
Missouri area codes: 314/557, 417, 573/235, 636, 660, 816/975
