= Area codes 608 and 353 =

Area codes in southwestern Wisconsin

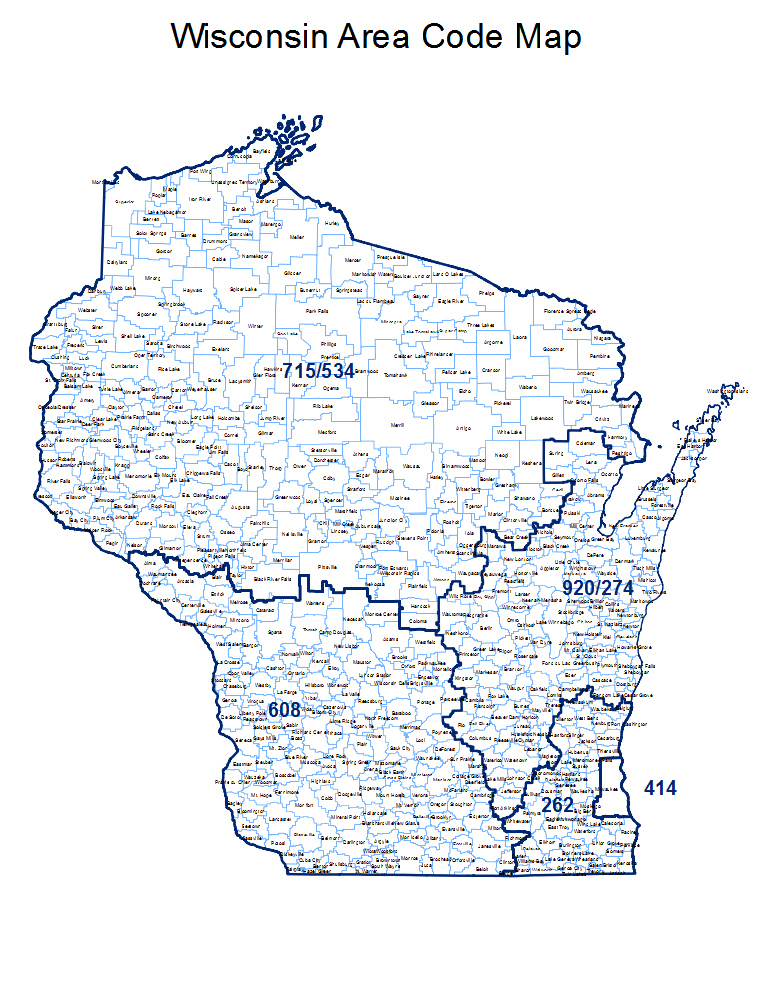
Numbering plan areas and area codes of Wisconsin

Area codes 608 and 353 are telephone area codes in the North American Numbering Plan (NANP) for much of southwestern Wisconsin, including the state capital city Madison.

== History ==
Wisconsin was divided into two numbering plan areas (NPAs) when the American Telephone and Telegraph Company created the first nationwide telephone numbering plan.

Area code 608 was assigned in 1955 to a numbering plan area that was created from a border rearrangement of the existing NPAs 414 and 715.

During the implementation of Direct Distance Dialing, dialing area code 608 became mandatory for intrastate calling in 1960.

Prior to October 2021, area code 608 had telephone numbers assigned for the central office code 988. In 2020, 988 was designated nationwide as a dialing code for the National Suicide Prevention Lifeline, which created a conflict for exchanges that permit seven-digit dialing. This area code was therefore scheduled to transition to ten-digit dialing by October 24, 2021.

Rapid growth of the area, specifically in Dane County, brought the area code close to exhaustion of central office prefixes, with NANPA projections in 2022 forecasting the need for relief by late 2023. In September 2022, the Wisconsin Public Service Commission and North American Numbering Plan Administrator (NANPA) announced an overlay complex for the numbering plan area with new area code 353, with an in-service date of September 15, 2023. New central office code orders were accepted starting on July 11, 2023, but activation is contingent on complete exhaustion of central office codes for 608.

== Service area ==
The counties in the numbering plan area are Adams, Buffalo, Columbia, Crawford, Dane, Grant, Green, Iowa, Jackson, Juneau, La Crosse, Lafayette, Marquette, Monroe, Richland, Rock, Sauk, Trempealeau, and Vernon.

Cities in the numbering plan area are Madison, Verona, Sun Prairie, Monroe, Platteville, Lancaster, Lodi, Portage, Baraboo, Wisconsin Dells, Beloit, Janesville, La Crosse, Prairie du Chien, Viroqua, and Sparta.

== See also ==
- List of North American Numbering Plan area codes
- List of Wisconsin area codes

Wisconsin area codes: 262, 414, 608/353, 715/534, 920/274
	North: 534/715	
West: 507/924, 563	353/608	East: 262, 274/920
	South: 779/815	
Illinois area codes: 217/447, 309/861, 312, 630/331, 618/730, 708/464, 773, 815/779, 847/224, 872
Iowa area codes: 319, 515, 563, 641, 712
Minnesota area codes: 218, 320, 507/924, 612, 651, 763, 952
