= Area codes 217 and 447 =

Area codes in west and central Illinois, United States

Coordinates: 39°52′00″N 88°57′00″W

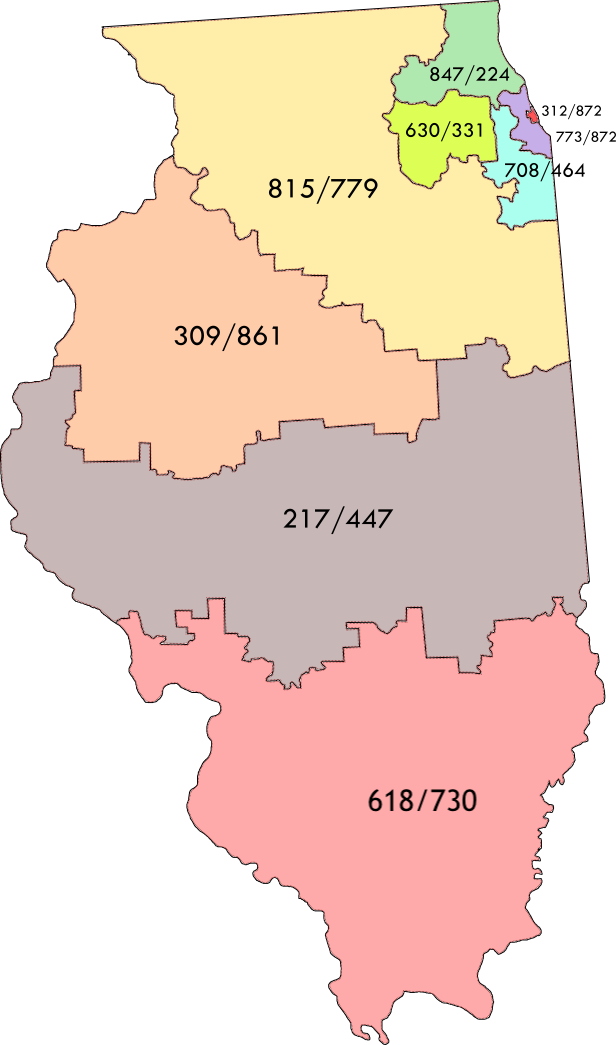
All NPAs within Illinois

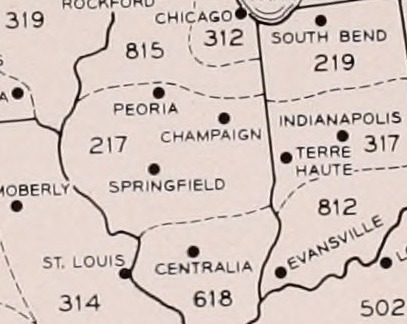
Area code 217 of 1951–1957.

Area codes 217 and 447 are telephone area codes in the North American Numbering Plan (NANP) for much of the central part of the U.S. state of Illinois. The numbering plan area (NPA) includes the state capital, Springfield, and Champaign, Urbana, Decatur, Taylorville, Lincoln, Danville, Effingham, Quincy, Rantoul, and Jacksonville. 217 was one of the original North American area codes created in 1947 and 447 was added to the same area in 2021 to form an all-services overlay.

== History ==
In the original configuration of the first nationwide telephone numbering plan, the numbering plan area 217 included most of Metro East, the Illinois side of the St. Louis metropolitan area. In 1951, a slight boundary shift reassigned most of the southern portion of Metro East to area code 618, leaving the northern portion in 217. The only other significant change in boundaries was after September 1956, when its northern portion (Peoria, Bloomington-Normal) was combined with part of the region of area code 815 to form a new numbering plan area with area code 309.

In 2006, the Illinois Commerce Commission approved an all-services overlay for the numbering plan area, adding new area code 447 in 2021. As of March 27, 2021, new central office codes are available for activation by service providers. A permissive dialing period was in effect from August 29, 2020, to February 27, 2021, when ten-digit dialing for local calls became mandatory.

== Service area ==
Smaller municipalities in the numbering plan area are:

- Arcola
- Arthur
- Assumption
- Athens
- Auburn
- Augusta
- Beardstown
- Benld
- Casey
- Carlinville
- Carthage
- Chandlerville
- Charleston
- Chatham
- Clinton
- Danville
- Decatur
- Effingham
- Forsyth
- Georgetown
- Gibson City
- Gillespie
- Girard
- Greenup
- Greenville
- Hamilton
- Harvel
- Hillsboro
- Hoopeston
- Illiopolis
- Indianola
- Jacksonville
- Jerome
- Leland Grove
- Lincoln
- Litchfield
- Macon
- Mahomet
- Maroa
- Marshall
- Mattoon
- Meredosia
- Monticello
- Morrisonville
- Mount Auburn
- Mount Zion
- Moweaqua
- Nauvoo
- New Berlin
- Nokomis
- Oconee
- Ogden
- Palmer
- Pana
- Paris
- Paxton
- Petersburg
- Pittsfield
- Quincy
- Rantoul
- Raymond
- Riverton
- Rochester
- Rushville
- Shelbyville
- Sherman
- Southern View
- St. Joseph
- Strasburg
- Sullivan
- Thawville
- Taylorville
- Teutopolis
- Toledo
- Tolono
- Tower Hill
- Tuscola
- Urbana
- Virden
- Villa Grove
- Westville
- Waggoner
- Warrensburg
- Williamsville

== See also ==
- List of North American Numbering Plan area codes
- List of Illinois area codes

Illinois area codes: 217/447, 309/861, 312, 630/331, 618/730, 708/464, 773, 815/779, 847/224, 872
	North: 309/861, 319, 815/779	
West: 573/235	217/447	East: 765, 812/930
	South: 618/730	
Missouri area codes: 314/557, 417, 573/235, 636, 660, 816/975
Iowa area codes: 319, 515, 563, 641, 712
Indiana area codes: 219, 260, 317/463, 574, 765, 812/930
