= Area codes 573 and 235 =

Area code in Missouri, United States

Coordinates: 38°30′N 92°00′W

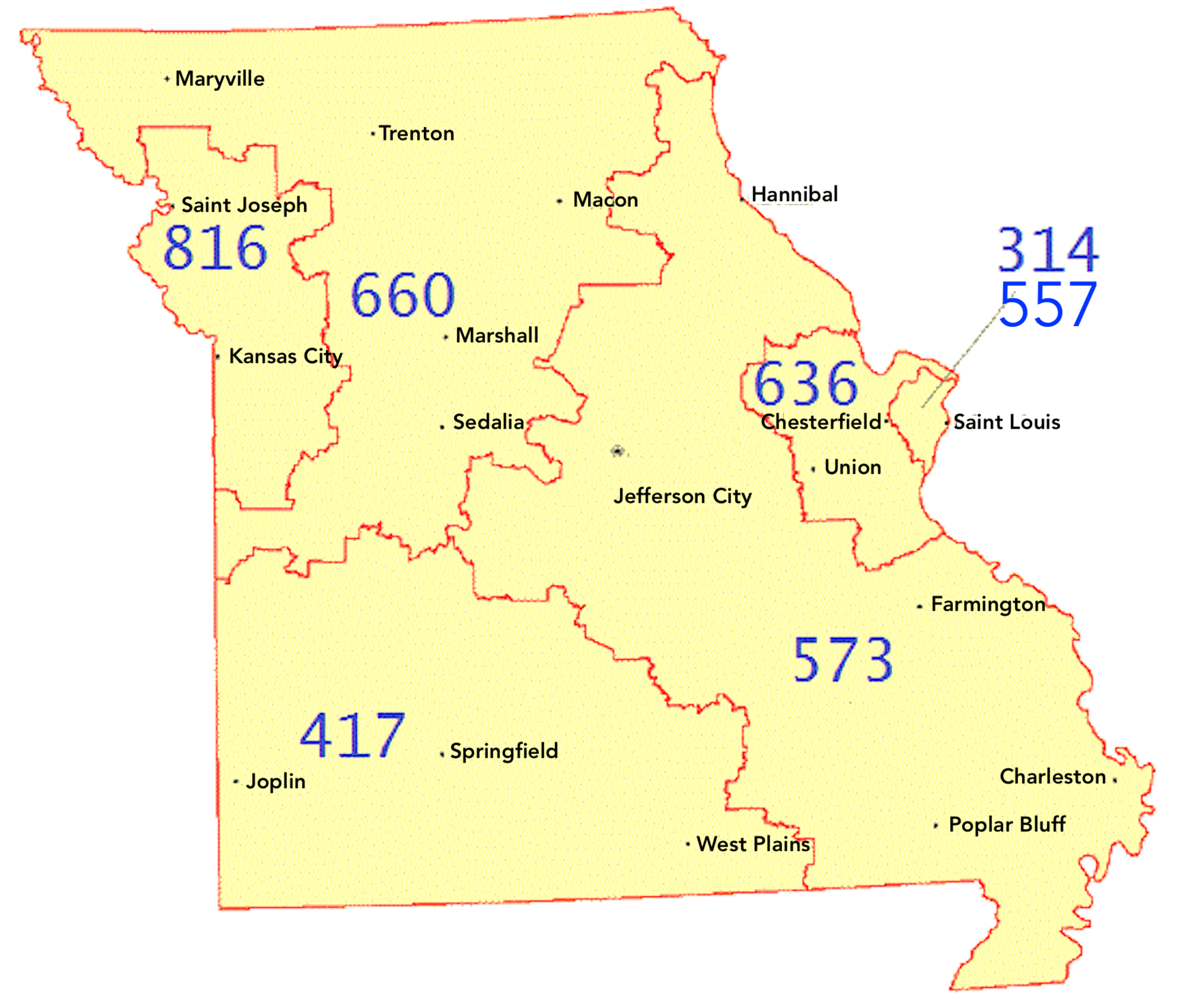

Area codes 573 and 235 are telephone area codes in the North American Numbering Plan (NANP) for most of the eastern half of the U.S. state of Missouri outside the immediate St. Louis area, including the state capital of Jefferson City, as well as Columbia, Cape Girardeau, Hannibal, Rolla, and Sikeston. The largest cities are Columbia, home to the University of Missouri, and Jefferson City, the state capital. The numbering plan area (NPA) extends across half of the width of the state, with the northeastern tip near the northeastern corner of the state, the Lake of the Ozarks at the western tip and Doniphan as the southwestern tip. They also serves all of southeastern Missouri (including the Missouri Bootheel area) and areas adjacent to the Mississippi River. 573 was created on January 7, 1996, in a split of area code 314, which was limited to the St. Louis metropolitan area in Missouri, and 235 was added on March 24, 2024 as part of an overlay complex.

== History ==
When the American Telephone and Telegraph Company (AT&T) created a universal North American telephone numbering plan for Operator Toll Dialing in 1947, Missouri was divided into two numbering plan areas (NPAs), which received the area codes 314 and 816. Area code 314 identified the eastern part of the state, from the northeast corner of the state at the Illinois border along a southwestern line near Columbia and Jefferson City to the center of the state, and continuing southeast into the east side of the West Plains area to the Arkansas state line. The largest city of the area code was St. Louis on the Mississippi river in the east.

By 1995, the telephone subscriber base had experienced substantial growth, threatening the exhaustion of the numbering pool. Relief planning entailed the division of the numbering plan area to create a new area code, 573, for most areas outside of the St. Louis metropolitan area, which retained area code 314. The area code split became effective at day end of January 7, 1996, with a permissive dialing period commencing until July 7, 1996, during which the new numbering plan area could be dialed with either area code.

On May 1, 2022, the Missouri Public Service Commission (MPSC) approved an all-services distributed overlay complex for the 573 numbering plan area, effective March 24, 2024. On June 17, 2022, the NANP Administrator assigned area code 235 for the relief action, beginning with a permissive dialing period of six months on August 26, 2023 (as 573 was not affected by the 2021 requirement to change to ten-digit dialing due to the implementation of the 988 Suicide & Crisis Lifeline).

== Service area ==
Major cities

- Columbia
- Cape Girardeau
- Farmington
- Hannibal
- Jefferson City
- Rolla
- Poplar Bluff
- Sikeston

Other cities

- Bowling Green
- Camdenton
- Centralia
- Dexter
- Fulton
- Hermann
- Jackson
- Mexico
- St. James
- Sullivan
- Waynesville

Missouri area codes: 314/557, 417, 573/235, 636, 660, 816/975
	North: 660, 217/447	
West: 660, 417, 816/975	573/235	East: 636, 618/730, 270/364, 731, 314/557
	South: 417, 870/327	
Illinois area codes: 217/447, 309/861, 312, 630/331, 618/730, 708/464, 773, 815/779, 847/224, 872
Kentucky area codes: 270/364, 502, 606, 859
Tennessee area codes: 423, 615/629, 731, 865, 901, 931
Arkansas area codes: 479, 501, 870/327
