= Area codes 618 and 730 =

Telephone area code for southern Illinois

Coordinates: 38°04′N 88°53′W

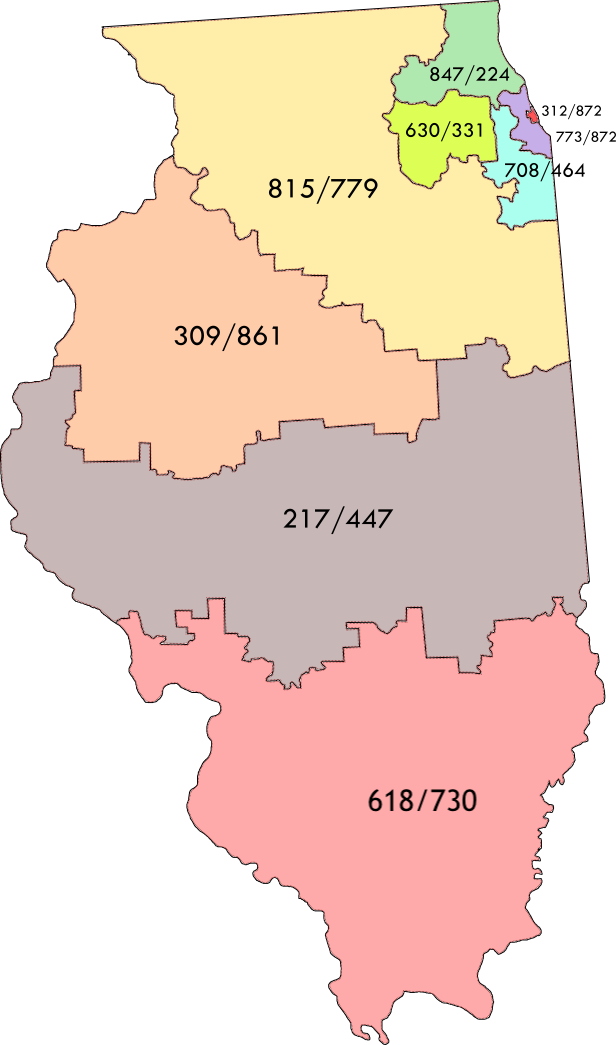
The numbering plan areas and area codes of Illinois

Area codes 618 and 730 are telephone area codes in the North American Numbering Plan (NANP) for southern Illinois. The numbering plan area (NPA) comprises one hundred and twenty-six municipalities, such as Carbondale, Cairo, Belleville, East St. Louis, Edwardsville, Marion, O'Fallon, Alton, Mt. Vernon, Centralia, Herrin, Salem, Metropolis, Fairview Heights, Collinsville, and Granite City. Area code 618 was one of the original North American area codes created in 1947, and 730 was added to the plan area to form an overlay complex to satisfy the need for more telephone numbers in the region. The current population of the 618/730 area code is 1,288,816 people. It encompasses approximately 15,458 square mile (9,893,120 acres); and has a population density of 83.38 people per square mile.

== History ==
When the American Telephone and Telegraph Company (AT&T) organized the nation's telephone networks in 1947 under a new nationwide telephone numbering plan, Illinois was divided into four numbering plan areas to accommodate large number of central offices that were necessary for the state's dense population and toll call routing infrastructure.

Area code 618 was assigned to a numbering plan area in southern Illinois, including the population centers of East St. Louis and Carbondale. In 1954, most of Metro East of St. Louis switched from area code 217 to 618.

Projections in 2021 by the North American Numbering Plan Administrator, indicated central office code exhaustion by 2025. Periodic proposals were made for code relief, and area code 730 was designated for an overlay complex. Implementation was completed with an in-service date of July 7, 2023, resulting in all Illinois area codes being overlay codes.

Prior to October 2021, area code 618 had telephone numbers assigned for the central office code 988. In 2020, 988 was designated nationwide as a dialing code for the National Suicide Prevention Lifeline, which created a conflict for exchanges that permit seven-digit dialing. This area code was therefore scheduled to transition to ten-digit dialing by October 24, 2021.

== Cities in the service area ==
A-C

- Albion
- Altamont
- Alton
- Anna
- Ashley
- Ava
- Aviston
- Batchtown
- Beckemyer
- Belleville
- Benld
- Benton
- Bethalto
- Breese
- Brighton
- Brookport
- Brussels
- Bunker Hill
- Cahokia
- Cairo
- Carbondale
- Carlyle
- Carmi
- Carrier Mills
- Carterville
- Caseyville
- Centralia
- Centreville
- Chester
- Christopher
- Cisne
- Collinsville
- Columbia
- Creal Springs

D-L

- Dahlgren
- Dupo
- Du Quoin
- East St. Louis
- Edwardsville
- Elizabethtown
- Eldorado
- Fairfield
- Fairview Heights
- Flora
- Freeburg
- Galatia
- Glen Carbon
- Godfrey
- Golconda
- Golden Eagle
- Grafton
- Grand Tower
- Granite City
- Grayville
- Greenville
- Hamburg
- Hamel
- Hardin
- Harrisburg
- Hecker
- Herrin
- Highland
- Hurst
- Jerseyville
- Johnston City
- Johnsonville
- Jonesboro
- Kampsville
- Keyesport
- Kinmundy
- Lawrenceville
- Louisville
- Lebanon

M-O

- Madison
- Marion
- Mascoutah
- McLeansboro
- Meppen
- Metropolis
- Michael
- Mound City
- Mounds
- Mount Carmel
- Mount Olive
- Mount Vernon
- Mulberry Grove
- Murphysboro
- Nashville
- Nason
- New Athens
- New Baden
- Newton
- Norris City
- O'Fallon
- Oakdale
- Okawville
- Olney
- Orient

P-Z

- Pontoon Beach
- Pinckneyville
- Raleigh
- Red Bud
- Robinson
- Roxana
- Rosiclare
- Salem
- Scott Air Force Base
- Sesser
- Shawneetown
- Shiloh
- Sims
- Smithton
- Sparta
- St. Elmo
- St. Francisville
- Staunton
- Sumner
- Swansea
- Tamms
- Trenton
- Troy
- Vandalia
- Venice
- Vergennes
- Vienna
- Wamac
- Washington Park
- Waterloo
- Wayne City
- West Frankfort
- Wood River
- Zeigler

== See also ==
- List of Illinois area codes
- List of North American Numbering Plan area codes

Illinois area codes: 217/447, 309/861, 312, 630/331, 618/730, 708/464, 773, 815/779, 847/224, 872
	North: 217/447	
West: 314/557, 636, 573/235	618/730	East: 812/930
	South: 573/235, 270/364	
Missouri area codes: 314/557, 417, 573/235, 636, 660, 816/975
Kentucky area codes: 270/364, 502, 606, 859
Indiana area codes: 219, 260, 317/463, 574, 765, 812/930
