= List of Missouri area codes =

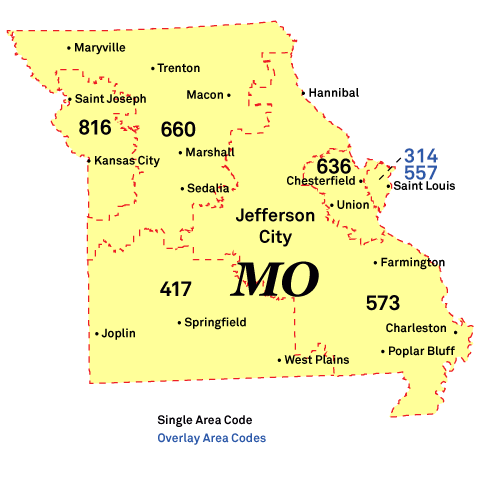

In 1947, when the American Telephone and Telegraph Company (AT&T) published the first configuration of a nationwide telephone numbering plan, the first version of the North American Numbering Plan (NANP), the U.S. state of Missouri was divided into two numbering plan areas (314 and 816). In 1950, the boundaries were redrawn in the creation of a third numbering plan area, 816. This configuration was stable for forty years into the 1990s, when rapid expansion of telecommunication service required additional area codes.

Area code	Created	Parent NPA	Overlay	Numbering plan area
314	1947	–	314/557	St. Louis and many of its immediate suburbs
557	2022	314	314/557	St. Louis and many of its immediate suburbs
573	1996	314	235/573	Eastern and southeastern Missouri (Columbia, Jefferson City, Rolla, Cape Girardeau, Perryville, and Hannibal)
235	2023	573	235/573	Eastern and southeastern Missouri (Columbia, Jefferson City, Rolla, Cape Girardeau, Perryville, and Hannibal)
636	1999	314	–	St. Charles, Jefferson, and western St. Louis counties, which forms a ring around the immediate St. Louis area
816	1947	–	816/975	Kansas City and St. Joseph metropolitan areas
975	2002	816	816/975	Kansas City and St. Joseph metropolitan areas
417	1950	816, 314	–	Southwestern Missouri (Springfield, Joplin, and Branson)
660	1997	816	–	Northern and western Missouri (part of St. Joseph metropolitan area, but including Sedalia, Kirksville, Warrensburg, Maryville)

== See also ==
- List of North American Numbering Plan area codes
