= Area codes 812 and 930 =

Area codes that serve the southern third of the state of Indiana

Coordinates: 38.91°N 86.04°W

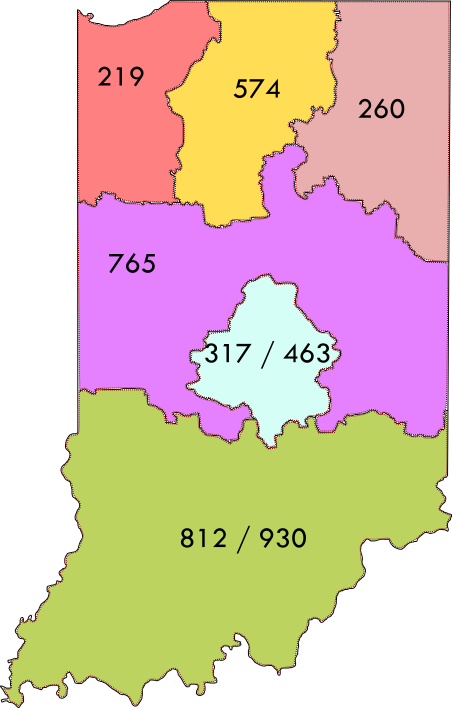
The area codes of Indiana

Area codes 812 and 930 are telephone area codes in the North American Numbering Plan (NANP) for the southern third of the state of Indiana.

The numbering plan area (NPA) includes Evansville and most of its suburbs, the Indiana portions of the Louisville and Cincinnati metropolitan areas, and the cities of Bedford, Bloomington, Columbus, Greensburg, Jasper, Princeton, Seymour, Terre Haute, and Vincennes. The NPA also serves a small section of Kentucky located adjacent to Evansville and north of the Ohio River whose most notable landmark is Ellis Park Race Course, a Thoroughbred horse racing track.

== History ==
In 1947, American Telephone and Telegraph (AT&T) published the first configuration of proposed numbering plan areas (NPAs) for a new nationwide numbering and toll call routing system. Indiana was divided to receive two area codes. Area code 317 served the northern two-thirds of Indiana, while area code 812 served the southern third. Despite the presence of Evansville, Terre Haute and Bloomington, southern Indiana is not as densely populated as the rest of the state. As a result, this configuration remained in place for more than six decades. 812 is one of the few original area codes, not counting those covering an entire state, that still had its original boundaries.

By 2013, area code 812 was expected to exhaust its supply of central office prefixes in 2015. This prompted area code relief proceedings. On July 31, 2013, it was announced that 812 would be overlaid with area code 930, the state's first overlay. The number shortage was exacerbated by the proliferation of cell phones, particularly in Evansville and the Louisville area, along with the western suburbs within the Cincinnati Tri-State area. On March 1, 2014, a six-month permissive dialing period began, during which it was possible to dial calls within the 812 area with seven or ten digits.

Mandatory ten-digit dialing was originally planned for September 6, 2014, with the first 930 numbers to become available in October. However, in August, the Indiana Utility Regulatory Commission delayed the implementation of mandatory ten-digit dialing until February 7, 2015, and the assignments of the first 930 numbers until March 7 to provide law enforcement and emergency medical services more time to update their telecommunication equipment.

== Service area ==
Counties (partial)

- Brown
- Clay
- Decatur
- Franklin
- Henderson (Kentucky)
- Johnson
- Monroe
- Owen
- Rush
- Shelby
- Vigo

Counties (entirely)

- Bartholomew
- Clark
- Crawford
- Daviess
- Dearborn
- Dubois
- Floyd
- Gibson
- Greene
- Harrison
- Jackson
- Jefferson
- Jennings
- Knox
- Lawrence
- Martin
- Ohio
- Orange
- Perry
- Pike
- Posey
- Ripley
- Scott
- Spencer
- Sullivan
- Switzerland
- Vanderburgh
- Warrick
- Washington

Communities

- Austin
- Aurora
- Batesville
- Bedford
- Bicknell
- Birdseye
- Bloomfield
- Bloomington
- Boonville
- Brazil
- Bright
- Chandler
- Charlestown
- Chrisney
- Clarksville
- Columbus
- Corydon
- Crandall
- Crothersville
- Dale
- Depauw
- Darmstadt
- Edinburgh
- Elizabeth
- Ellettsville
- English
- Evansville
- Farmersburg
- Ferdinand
- Fort Branch
- Fredericksburg
- French Lick
- Georgetown
- Greensburg
- Hardinsburg
- Hatfield
- Haubstadt
- Henryville
- Huntingburg
- Ireland
- Jasonville
- Jasper
- Jeffersonville
- Lawrenceburg
- Leavenworth
- Lincoln City
- Linton
- Loogootee
- Madison
- Marengo
- Mauckport
- Milan
- Millhousen
- Milltown
- Mitchell
- Morgantown
- Mount Vernon
- Nashville
- New Albany
- New Harmony
- New Salisbury
- Newburgh
- North Vernon
- Oakland City
- Orleans
- Owensville
- Paoli
- Palmyra
- Patoka
- Petersburg
- Poseyville
- Princeton
- Ramsey
- Reo
- Richland
- Rising Sun
- Rockport
- Salem
- Santa Claus
- Scottsburg
- Sellersburg
- Seymour
- Shoals
- Sullivan
- Taswell
- Taylorsville
- Tell City
- Terre Haute
- Vevay
- Vincennes
- Washington
- Worthington
- Westport
- Yankeetown

== See also ==
- List of Indiana area codes
- List of North American Numbering Plan area codes

Indiana area codes: 219, 260, 317/463, 574, 765, 812/930
	North: 317/463, 765	
West: 217/447, 618/730	812/930	East: 513/283, 859
	South: 270/364, 502	
Illinois area codes: 217/447, 309/861, 312, 630/331, 618/730, 708/464, 773, 815/779, 847/224, 872
Kentucky area codes: 270/364, 502, 606, 859
Ohio area codes: 216, 330/234, 419/567, 440/436, 513/283, 614/380, 740/220, 937/326
