= Area codes 314 and 557 =

Telephone area code for St. Louis, Missouri

Coordinates: 38°37′N 90°13′W

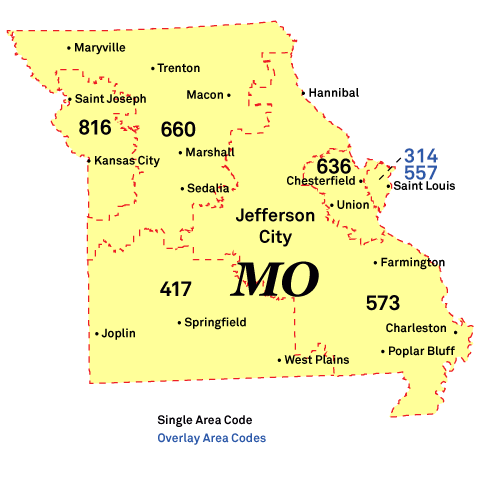

Area codes 314 and 557 are telephone area codes in the North American Numbering Plan (NANP) in the U.S. state of Missouri, serving the city of St. Louis and most of its inner-ring suburbs in neighboring St. Louis County. The numbering plan area is bordered to the west by area code 636, which serves St. Louis' outer suburbs to the west, south, and north. Across the Mississippi River to the east, 314 is adjacent to area code 618, which serves southern Illinois and most of Metro East. Area code 557 was added to the 314 numbering plan area on August 12, 2022, to form an overlay numbering plan.

== History ==
When the American Telephone and Telegraph Company (AT&T) created a universal North American telephone numbering plan for Operator Toll Dialing in 1947, and assigned the original North American area codes to numbering plan areas (NPAs), Missouri was divided into two NPAs, which received the area codes 314 and 816. Area code 314 identified the eastern part of the state, from the northeast corner of the state at the Illinois border along a southwestern line near Columbia and Jefferson City to the center of the state, and continuing southeast into the east side of the West Plains area to the Arkansas state line. The largest city of the area code was St. Louis on the Mississippi river in the east.

By 1995, the telephone subscriber base had experienced substantial growth, threatening the exhaustion of the numbering pool. Relief planning entailed the division of the numbering plan area to create a new area code, 573, for most areas outside of the St. Louis metropolitan area, which would retain area code 314. The area code split became effective at day end of January 7, 1996, with a permissive dialing period commencing until July 7, 1996, during which the new numbering plan area could be dialed with both area codes.

Although area code splits were intended as long-term solutions, within only two years, 314 was close to exhaustion once again due to the proliferation of cell phones, fax machines and pagers in St. Louis. As a result, 314 was reduced to include only the exchanges of Chestnut, Jefferson, Prospect, Flanders, Forest, Mission, Melrose, Webster Groves, Parkview, Evergreen, Riverview, Ferguson, Overland, Ladue, Kirkwood, Sappington, Mehlville, Oakville, Creve Coeur, Bridgeton, Hazelwood, Florissant, and Spanish Lake in the core of the St. Louis area. All other exchanges were reassigned to the new area code 636, effective May 22, 1999, with the permissive dialing period ending on February 26, 2000.

On October 24, 2000, the Missouri Public Service Commission announced plans to add a second area code for the 314 numbering plan area, creating an overlay, but postponed the implementation date (May 5, 2002) indefinitely on September 25, 2001, when the commission determined no immediate need for additional central office prefixes. Conservation measures, such as number pooling, mitigated the immediate need for relief. More than twenty years after that announcement, area code 557 was overlaid on August 12, 2022, as the available numbers in 314 neared exhaustion.

Prior to October 2021, area code 314 had telephone numbers assigned for the central office code 988. In 2020, 988 was designated nationwide as a dialing code for the National Suicide Prevention Lifeline, which created a conflict for exchanges that permit seven-digit dialing. This area code was therefore scheduled to transition to ten-digit dialing by October 24, 2021.

== See also ==
- List of Missouri area codes
- List of North American Numbering Plan area codes

Missouri area codes: 314/557, 417, 573/235, 636, 660, 816/975
	North: 636	
West: 636	314/557	East: 618/730
	South: 573/235	
Illinois area codes: 217/447, 309/861, 312, 630/331, 618/730, 708/464, 773, 815/779, 847/224, 872
