= Area code 502 =

Area code in Kentucky, United States

Kentucky's numbering plan areas and area codes

Area code 502 is a telephone area code in the North American Numbering Plan for north-central Kentucky. The numbering plan area includes the city of Louisville, its suburbs, and the state capital, Frankfort.

== History ==
Area code 502 is one of the original North American area codes established in October 1947, initially assigned to the entire state of Kentucky. The eastern half of the state was assigned area code 606 in 1954, and the western half was assigned area code 270 in 1999.

On August 19, 2025, the Kentucky Public Service Commission approved the addition of area code 761 to the 502 numbering plan area, creating an overlay complex to avert exhaustion of central office codes in the NPA, which is forecasted for the third quarter of 2027. The area code is reserved by the North American Numbering Plan Administrator, but has not been officially assigned and a specific relief plan has not been announced.

== Service area ==
The numbering plan area comprises the following Kentucky counties. The boundary tracks closely, but not exactly, existing county lines.

- Anderson County
- Bullitt County
- Carroll County
- Franklin County
- Henry County
- Jefferson County
- Nelson County
- Oldham County
- Owen County
- Scott County
- Shelby County
- Spencer County
- Trimble County

Parts of Hardin and Meade counties are also served by this area code, specifically:

- The Fort Knox Army installation, located primarily in Hardin County, also spreads into Meade, and Bullitt counties.
- The city of Muldraugh, which straddles the Meade–Hardin County line and is surrounded by Fort Knox.
- The city of West Point in Hardin County and its surrounding area, which is separated from the rest of Hardin County by Fort Knox.

Other cities in the 502 numbering plan area include Georgetown, Shelbyville, and Bardstown. Georgetown is a long-distance call to other cities with the area code, but is a free local call to Lexington, which uses area code 859.

== See also ==
- List of Kentucky area codes
- List of North American Numbering Plan area codes

Kentucky area codes: 270/364, 502, 606, 859
	North: 812/930	
West: 812/930	502	East: 859
	South: 270/364, 859	
Indiana area codes: 219, 260, 317/463, 574, 765, 812/930
