= Area code 641 =

Area code for a central portion of Iowa

Numbering plan areas of Iowa with the red area indicating area code 641

Area code 641 is a telephone area code in the North American Numbering Plan (NANP) for the central region of the U.S. state of Iowa. The numbering plan area (NPA) includes Marshalltown, Mason City, and Ottumwa. The area code was created in a split of area code 515 on July 9, 2000, which was the first split in Iowa since the establishment of the area code system in 1947.

In 2006, various companies began using Iowa's 641 as a number to access voice over IP gateways, including one which purported to allow users to "call China for free". The scheme, no longer in operation, was based on the wholesale cost of calls to rural Iowa being substantially more than the cost of Internet calls to China.

== See also ==
- List of Iowa area codes

Iowa area codes: 319, 515, 563, 641, 712
| | North: 507/924 | |
| West: 515, 712 | area code 641 | East: 319, 563 |
| | South: 660 | |
Minnesota area codes: 218, 320, 507/924, 612, 651, 763, 952
Missouri area codes: 314/557, 417, 573/235, 636, 660, 816/975
