= Area code 636 =

Area code for east-central Missouri

Coordinates: 38°36′N 90°36′W

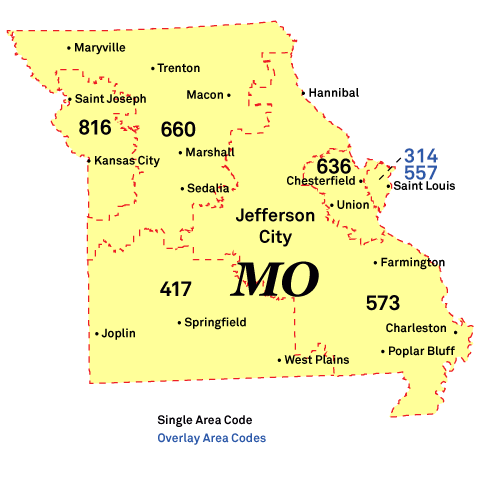
Area codes of Missouri

Area code 636 is a telephone area code in North American Numbering Plan (NANP) for the east-central part of the U.S. state of Missouri, comprising mainly the western suburbs of St. Louis. It includes parts of Chesterfield and Fenton in St. Louis County, and all of St. Charles, Jefferson, and Warren counties, all of Franklin County with the exception of Sullivan, as well as the towns of High Hill and Jonesburg in Montgomery County and the southern portion of Lincoln County. It was created in 1999 in an area code split from area code 314, which was one of the original North American area codes of 1947.

== History ==
When the American Telephone and Telegraph Company (AT&T) created a universal North American telephone numbering plan for Operator Toll Dialing in 1947, Missouri was divided into two numbering plan areas (NPAs), which received the area codes 314 and 816. Area code 314 identified the eastern part of the state, from the northeast corner of the state at the Illinois border along a southwestern line near Columbia and Jefferson City to the center of the state, and continuing southeast into the east side of the West Plains area to the Arkansas state line. The largest city of the area code was St. Louis on the Mississippi river in the east.

By 1995, the telephone subscriber base experienced substantial growth, threatening the exhaustion of the numbering pool. Relief planning entailed the division of the numbering plan area to create a new area code, 573, for most areas outside of the St. Louis metropolitan area, which would retained area code 314. The area code split became effective at day end of January 7, 1996, with a permissive dialing period commencing until July 7, 1996, during which the new numbering plan area could be dialed with both area codes.

Although area code splits were intended as long-term solutions, within only two years, 314 was close to exhaustion once again due to the proliferation of cell phones, fax machines and pagers in St. Louis. As a result, 314 was reduced to include only the exchanges of Chestnut, Jefferson, Prospect, Flanders, Forest, Mission, Melrose, Webster Groves, Parkview, Evergreen, Riverview, Ferguson, Overland, Ladue, Kirkwood, Sappington, Mehlville, Oakville, Creve Coeur, Bridgeton, Hazelwood, Florissant, and Spanish Lake in the core of the St. Louis area. All other exchanges were reassigned to the new area code 636, effective May 22, 1999, with the permissive dialing period ending on February 26, 2000.

== Service area ==
Major cities in the numbering plan area are:

- Arnold
- Ballwin
- Chesterfield
- Eureka
- Lake St. Louis
- Manchester
- O'Fallon
- St. Charles
- St. Peters
- Town and Country
- Union
- Warrenton
- Washington
- Wentzville
- Wildwood

== See also ==
- "Area Code Maps". North American Numbering Plan Administrator.

Missouri area codes: 314/557, 417, 573/235, 636, 660, 816/975
	North: 573, 618, 314	
West: 573	area code 636	East: 618, 314
	South: 573, 314	
Illinois area codes: 217/447, 309/861, 312, 630/331, 618/730, 708/464, 773, 815/779, 847/224, 872
