= Area code 712 =

Telephone area code for western Iowa, United States

Numbering plan areas of Iowa with the red area indicating area code 712

Area code 712 is the telephone area code in the North American Numbering Plan (NANP) for the most western part of Iowa, including the cities of Spencer, Le Mars, Sioux City, Council Bluffs, Red Oak, Sheldon, Storm Lake, Carroll, Sac City, Logan, and Shenandoah.

Area code 712 was one of the original three area codes for the state of Iowa established in 1947. It is the only original area code in Iowa that still has its original boundaries, and one of the few remaining original area codes nationwide (not counting those covering an entire state) that has never been split or overlaid. Despite the proliferation of cell phones and pagers (particularly in Sioux City and Council Bluffs), it is projected to stay that way until at least 2031.

== See also ==
- List of Iowa area codes

Iowa area codes: 319, 515, 563, 641, 712
	North: 507/924	
West: 402/531, 531, 605	area code 712	East: 515, 641
	South: 660	
Minnesota area codes: 218, 320, 507/924, 612, 651, 763, 952
Missouri area codes: 314/557, 417, 573/235, 636, 660, 816/975
Nebraska area codes: 308, 402/531
South Dakota area codes: 605
