= Area code 765 =

Area code for central Indiana, U.S.

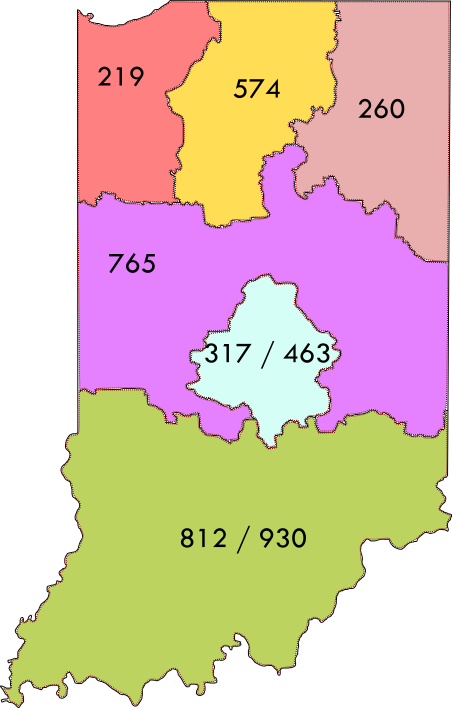
Area Code map for all of Indiana

Area code 765 is a telephone area code in the North American Numbering Plan (NANP) for the central part of the U.S. state of Indiana. The numbering plan area comprises a horseshoe-shaped region of twenty counties in Central Indiana except for the Indianapolis area, which is served by area codes 317 and 463. Some cities included are Anderson, Connersville, Crawfordsville, Frankfort, Greencastle, Kokomo, Lafayette, Lebanon, Marion, Muncie, New Castle, Richmond, and West Lafayette. The area code was created in 1997 in a split of area code 317.

== History ==
In 1947, American Telephone and Telegraph (AT&T) published the first configuration of proposed numbering plan areas (NPAs) for a new nationwide numbering and toll call routing system. Indiana was divided to receive two area codes. Area code 317 served the northern two-thirds of Indiana, while area code 812 served the southern third. In the first change of the original plan in 1948, 317 was cut back to central Indiana, while the northern third of Indiana, including Gary, Hammond, East Chicago, South Bend, Elkhart and Fort Wayne, received area code 219.

Prior to 1996, numbering plan area 317 consisted of all of Central Indiana. Eventually, population growth and increased demand for telecommunication services required an area code split to provide more central office prefixes for the region. Beginning on February 1, 1997, with mandatory 10-digit dialing effective June 28, the greater Indianapolis area retained area code 317 and the remainder of Central Indiana received the new area code 765. The creation of 765 came amid some fanfare, as it was Indiana's first new area code in 49 years.

== Service area ==
Entire counties

- Blackford County
- Clinton County
- Delaware County
- Fayette County
- Fountain County
- Grant County
- Henry County
- Howard County
- Montgomery County
- Parke County
- Putnam County
- Randolph County
- Rush County
- Tippecanoe County
- Tipton County
- Warren County
- Wayne County
- Union County
- Vermillion County

Partial counties

- Benton County
- Boone County
- Carroll County
- Clay County
- Decatur County
- Franklin County
- Hancock County
- Hamilton County
- Hendricks County
- Jay County
- Madison County
- Miami County
- Morgan County
- Shelby County
- Wabash County
- Wells County
- White County
- Vigo County

== See also ==
- List of Indiana area codes
- List of North American Numbering Plan area codes

Indiana area codes: 219, 260, 317/463, 574, 765, 812/930
	North: 219, 574, 260	
West: 217/447	765	East: 326/937
	South: 317/463, 812/930	
Ohio area codes: 216, 330/234, 419/567, 440/436, 513/283, 614/380, 740/220, 937/326
Illinois area codes: 217/447, 309/861, 312, 630/331, 618/730, 708/464, 773, 815/779, 847/224, 872
