= List of Illinois area codes =

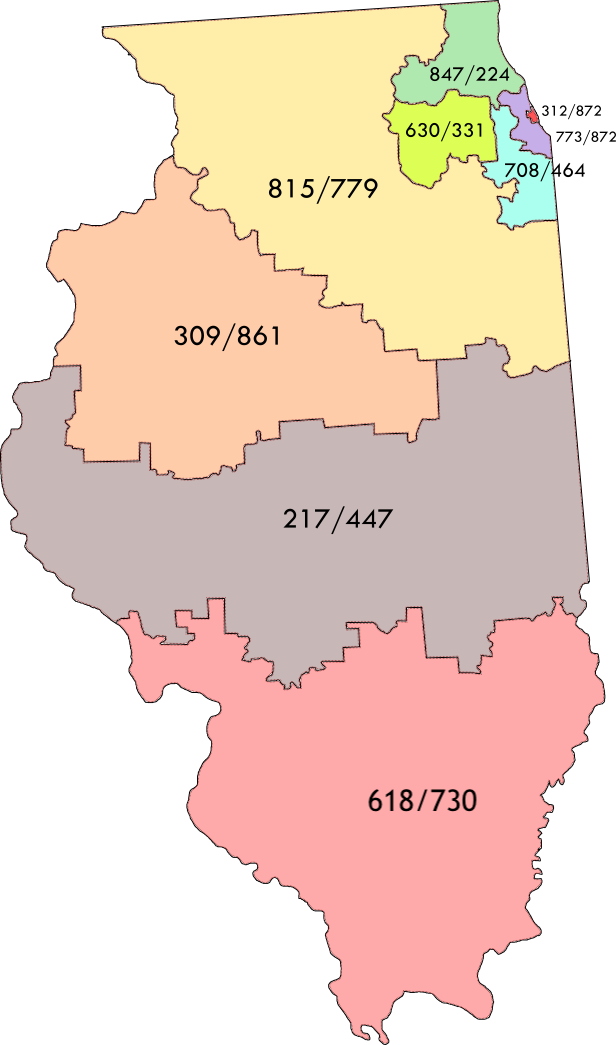
All NPAs within Illinois

The U.S. state of Illinois is divided into 10 distinct geographic numbering plan areas in the North American Numbering Plan (NANP), which are assigned a total of 17 area codes. When the 86 original North American area codes were established in 1947, all of the Chicago metropolitan area was located in numbering plan area 312, the rest of northern Illinois was 815, central Illinois was 217, and southern Illinois was 618.

In 1954, the 217 and 618 numbering plan areas were slightly remapped, and in 1957, area code 815 was split for the assignment of area code 309 to western central Illinois. No further changes were made for 33 years. Since 2023, all numbering plan areas of the state are overlay complexes, requiring 10-digit dialing statewide.

Area code	Year created	Parent NPA	Overlay	Numbering plan area
312	1947	–	312/872	Central city area of Chicago, including the Chicago Loop and the Near North Side
773	1996	312	773/872	Chicago area, exclusive of NPA 312
872	2009	312	312/872	City of Chicago
872	2009	773	773/872	City of Chicago
708	1989	312	708/464	South suburbs and inner west suburbs of Chicago, including the Chicago Southland and most west and south suburbs in Cook County including Melrose Park, Norridge, Oak Park, Oak Lawn, Chicago Heights, and Orland Park.
464	2022	708	708/464	South suburbs and inner west suburbs of Chicago, including the Chicago Southland and most west and south suburbs in Cook County including Melrose Park, Norridge, Oak Park, Oak Lawn, Chicago Heights, and Orland Park.
630	1996	708	331/630	West suburbs of Chicago in DuPage County and Kane County including Wheaton, Naperville, and Aurora
331	2007	630	331/630	West suburbs of Chicago in DuPage County and Kane County including Wheaton, Naperville, and Aurora
847	1996	708	224/847	North and northwest suburbs of Chicago including all of Lake County, part of McHenry County, northern Cook County, and northeastern Kane County. The NPA includes Evanston, Des Plaines, Waukegan, and most of Elgin.
224	2002	847	224/847	North and northwest suburbs of Chicago including all of Lake County, part of McHenry County, northern Cook County, and northeastern Kane County. The NPA includes Evanston, Des Plaines, Waukegan, and most of Elgin.
815	1947	–	779/815	Northern Illinois outside of the immediate Chicago area including Joliet, Kankakee, LaSalle, DeKalb, and Rockford
779	2007	815	779/815	Northern Illinois outside of the immediate Chicago area including Joliet, Kankakee, LaSalle, DeKalb, and Rockford
217	1947	–	217/447	Central Illinois, including the region running west from the Illinois-Indiana border through Danville, Effingham, Champaign–Urbana, Decatur, Springfield, Quincy until Illinois' western border with Missouri and Iowa
447	2021	217	217/447	Central Illinois, including the region running west from the Illinois-Indiana border through Danville, Effingham, Champaign–Urbana, Decatur, Springfield, Quincy until Illinois' western border with Missouri and Iowa
309	1957	217	309/861	Central-Western Illinois including Bloomington–Normal, Peoria, and all the way west to the Illinois part of the Quad Cities including Moline, and Rock Island
309	1957	815	309/861	Central-Western Illinois including Bloomington–Normal, Peoria, and all the way west to the Illinois part of the Quad Cities including Moline, and Rock Island
861	2023	309	309/861	Central-Western Illinois including Bloomington–Normal, Peoria, and all the way west to the Illinois part of the Quad Cities including Moline, and Rock Island
618	1947	–	618/730	Southern Illinois, including Carbondale and most of the Metro East region of St. Louis suburbs in Illinois
618	1954	217	618/730	Southern Illinois, including Carbondale and most of the Metro East region of St. Louis suburbs in Illinois
730	2023	618	618/730	Southern Illinois, including Carbondale and most of the Metro East region of St. Louis suburbs in Illinois

== See also ==
- List of North American Numbering Plan area codes
