= List of Indiana area codes =

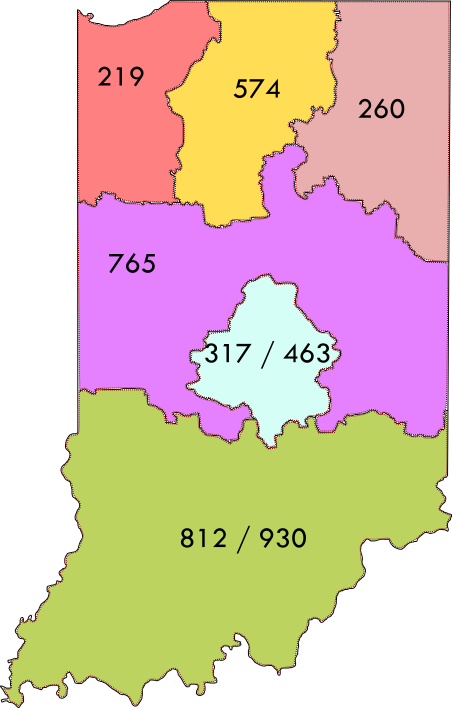
Area Codes of Indiana

The state of Indiana currently has 8 area codes, with a 9th (to relieve the 765 area code) expected by 2029.

Area code	Year created	Parent NPA	Overlay	Numbering plan area
317	1947	–	317/463	Metro Indianapolis; Boone County, Hancock County, Hamilton County, Hendricks County, Johnson County, Marion County, Morgan County, and Shelby County
463	2016	317	317/463	Metro Indianapolis; Boone County, Hancock County, Hamilton County, Hendricks County, Johnson County, Marion County, Morgan County, and Shelby County
219	1948	317	–	Northwest corner of the state, including Gary, Hammond, Merrillville, Valparaiso, and Michigan City
765	1997	317	–	Central Indiana, except the Indianapolis metro area
260	2002	219	–	Northeast Indiana, including Fort Wayne, and Angola.
574	2002	219	–	North-central Indiana, including South Bend, North Judson, and Warsaw
812	1947	–	812/930	Evansville, Vincennes, Terre Haute, Bloomington, Columbus, Madison, and Jeffersonville
930	2015	812	812/930	Evansville, Vincennes, Terre Haute, Bloomington, Columbus, Madison, and Jeffersonville

== See also ==
- List of North American Numbering Plan area codes
- "Area Code Maps". North American Numbering Plan Administrator.
