= Area code 219 =

Telephone system code in Indiana, United States

Coordinates: 41.149°N 87.240°W

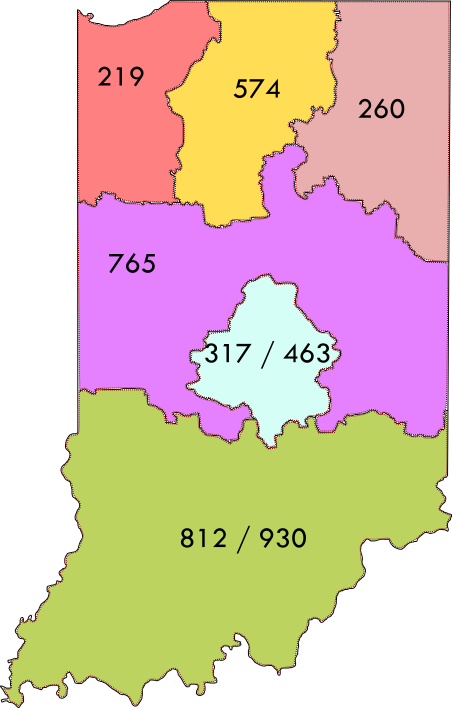
Area codes of Indiana

Area code 219 is a telephone area code in the North American Numbering Plan for Northwest Indiana, including the state's portion of the Chicago metropolitan area. The numbering plan area includes the cities of Schererville, Chesterton, Lake Station, Lowell, Crown Point, Cedar Lake, Hobart, Whiting, Gary, Hammond, East Chicago, Merrillville, Munster, Griffith, Highland, Portage, Valparaiso, Michigan City, Ogden Dunes, St. John, La Porte, DeMotte, Roselawn, Kouts, Lake Village, and Rensselaer. 219 is largely coextensive with the Indiana side of the Chicago metropolitan area, which includes Lake, Porter, La Porte, Newton, and Jasper Counties. Service is provided by AT&T, Frontier Communications, and Northwestern Indiana Telephone Company.

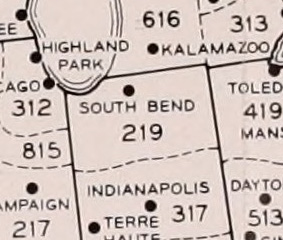
Area code 219 in 1952

== History ==
In 1947, American Telephone and Telegraph (AT&T) published the first configuration of proposed numbering plan areas (NPAs) for a new nationwide numbering and toll call routing system. Indiana was divided to receive two area codes. Area code 317 served the northern two-thirds of Indiana, while area code 812 served the southern third. In the first change of the original plan in 1948, 317 was cut back to central Indiana, while the northern third of Indiana, including Gary, Hammond, East Chicago, South Bend, Elkhart and Fort Wayne, received area code 219.

Despite the presence of the Chicago suburbs, Michiana and Fort Wayne, this configuration remained unchanged for 53 years. By the end of the 20th century, however, 219 was on the verge of exhaustion. When it was apparent that the need for a split could no longer be staved off, it was decided to split northern Indiana into three area codes. Northwest Indiana won a random drawing to decide which of the areas would keep 219. The central portion of the old 219 territory, centered on South Bend, became area code 574. The eastern portion, centered on Fort Wayne, became area code 260. The area codes split on January 15, 2002. Permissive dialing of 219 continued across northern Indiana until June 14, 2002.

Prior to October 2021, area code 219 had telephone numbers assigned for the central office code 988. In 2020, 988 was designated nationwide as a dialing code for the National Suicide Prevention Lifeline, which created a conflict for exchanges that permit seven-digit dialing. This area code was therefore scheduled to transition to ten-digit dialing by October 24, 2021.

== See also ==
- List of Indiana area codes
- List of North American Numbering Plan area codes

Indiana area codes: 219, 260, 317/463, 574, 765, 812/930
	North: 269, Lake Michigan	
West: 708/464, 773, 872, 815/779	219	East: 574
	South: 765	
Michigan area codes: 231, 248/947, 269, 313/679, 517, 586, 616, 734, 810, 906, 989
Illinois area codes: 217/447, 309/861, 312, 630/331, 618/730, 708/464, 773, 815/779, 847/224, 872
