= Notes on the Network =

Technical publication of U.S. telecom industry

Notes on the Network was a publication of the American Telephone & Telegraph Company (AT&T) that outlined the state, technology, and operating principles of the public switched telephone network in the United States and Canada, and the other member regions of the North American Numbering Plan and its predecessors.

The origins of publication date back to the 1945 communications about Nationwide Operator Toll Dialing disseminated by AT&T to the Bell System companies and to the independent telephone operators via the Dial interexchange Committee of the United States Independent Telephone Association (USITA). In 1955, AT&T published the first extensive edition under the title Notes on Nationwide Dialing, which was updated the following year (1956) under the title Notes on Distance Dialing. Additional editions were issued in 1961, 1968, and 1975. The first use of the title Notes on the Network was for the 1980 edition.

After the breakup of AT&T and the Bell System, the document was maintained and published by Bell Communications Research (BELLCORE) in 1983, 1986, 1990, 1994, and 1997. The 1983 and 1986 versions were known as Notes on the BOC Intra-LATA Networks, while the 1990 and 1994 editions had the title BOC Notes on the LEC Networks. The 1997 issue was entitled Bellcore Notes on the Networks.

Through divestiture in 1999, Bellcore was renamed Telcordia. A new edition of the Notes (Issue 4) was published in 2000 as Telcordia Notes on the Networks, which is the most recent version, as of 2017. Between 1999 and 2002, Telcordia also published a series of twenty-one topic-specific modules, available individually or as a set, known as the Telcordia Notes On... Technology Series, which have also not been updated since.

In 1983, shortly before the 1984 divestiture of AT&T, Telecom-Canada published Digital Network Notes, an update and companion volume to the 1980 AT&T Notes on the Network, with more specific information for the Canadian territory. It provided a detailed analysis of the history of analog and digital telecommunications, and offered references for the design, implementation, and operation of digital networks.

== See also ==
- Original North American area codes
