= Laura, Illinois =

- Unincorporated community
- Location within Illinois Location within the United States
- Coordinates: 40°55′17″N 89°55′35″W
- Country: United States
- State: Illinois
- County: Peoria
- Elevation: 728 ft (222 m)
- Time zone: UTC-6 (Central (CST))
  - Summer (DST): UTC-5 (CDT)
- ZIP code: 61451
- Area code: 309
- GNIS feature ID: 411849

Laura is an unincorporated community in Peoria County, Illinois, United States. Laura is located along a railroad line, 5 miles (8.0 km) east of Williamsfield. Laura has a post office with ZIP code 61451.

== History ==
Laura was platted in the late 1880s, and given the name of the daughter of a railroad official. A post office called Laura has been in operation since 1888.
