= Destination routing =

In telecommunications, destination routing is a methodology for selecting sequential pathways that messages must pass through to reach a target destination, based on a single destination address.

In electronic switching systems for circuit-based telephone calls, the destination stations are identified by a station address or more commonly, a telephone number.

The telephone network is organized in a hierarchical system of several classes of switching systems. An end office switch connects directly to the stations. It is programmed to connect certain trunk circuits to route every telephone call to the next intermediate switching center that is one step closer to the destination when given the destination telephone number. In the areas of the North American Numbering Plan, Class-4 telephone switches are the interchange points between numbering plan areas.
