= Area codes 708 and 464 =

Area code for southern suburbs of Chicago, Illinois

Coordinates: 41°30′24″N 87°38′30″W

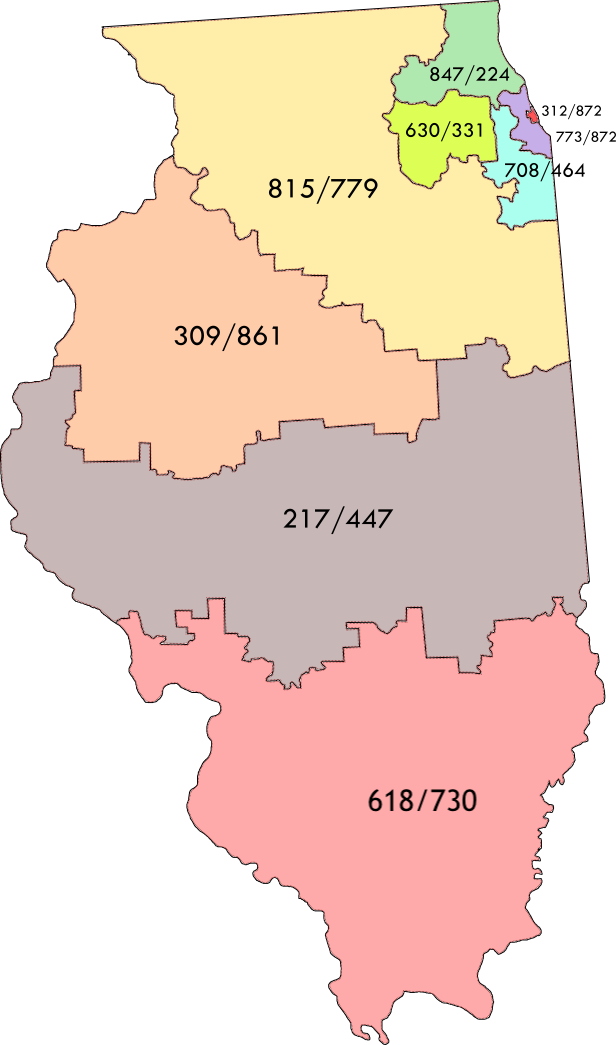
All NPAs within Illinois

Area codes 708 and 464 are telephone area codes in the North American Numbering Plan (NANP) for the southern and western suburbs of Chicago in the U.S. state of Illinois. The numbering plan area comprises most of western and southern Cook County, and eastern and southern Will County.

Area code 708 was created on November 11, 1989, in a split of area code 312. It once served almost all of Chicago's suburbs in Illinois. In 1996, its numbering plan area was reduced in a three-way area code split. The northern suburbs received area code 847, while the western suburbs were assigned area code 630. Area code 708 was Illinois' first new area code since 309 had been created in 1957, and the second new code for the state since the announcement of the original North American area codes in 1947, when the state was divided into four numbering plan areas (217, 312, 618, and 815).

The Illinois side of the Chicago area–312/773/872, 708/464, 847/224, 630/331, and portions of 815/779–is one of the largest local calling areas in the United States; with few exceptions, no long-distance charges are levied from one portion of the metro area to another.

Prior to October 2021, area code 708 had telephone numbers assigned for the central office code 988. In 2020, 988 was designated nationwide as a dialing code for the National Suicide Prevention Lifeline, which created a conflict for exchanges that permit seven-digit dialing. This area code was therefore scheduled to transition to ten-digit dialing by October 24, 2021.

On June 30, 1999, area code 464 was reserved for future relief in 708. Implementation was held off for over two decades until it became clear in 2021 that relief would be necessary. Area code 464 went into effect on January 21, 2022.

== Service area ==
Sixty cities are included in this plan:

- Alsip
- Beecher
- Bellwood
- Berwyn
- Blue Island
- Bridgeview
- Broadview
- Burbank
- Calumet City
- Chicago Heights
- Chicago Ridge
- Cicero
- Country Club Hills
- Crest Hill
- Crete
- Dolton
- East Hazel Crest
- Elmwood Park
- Evergreen Park
- Flossmoor
- Forest Park
- Glenwood
- Harvey
- Harwood Heights
- Hazel Crest
- Hickory Hills
- Homer Glen
- Homewood
- Justice
- La Grange
- Lansing
- Lynwood
- Lyons
- Markham
- Matteson
- Maywood
- Melrose Park
- Midlothian
- Mokena
- Monee
- Norridge
- Northlake
- Oak Forest
- Oak Lawn
- Oak Park
- Olympia Fields
- Orland Park
- Palos Hills
- Palos Park
- Park Forest
- Peotone
- Richton Park
- River Forest
- River Grove
- Riverdale
- Sauk Village
- South Holland
- Steger
- Tinley Park
- University Park
- Westchester
- Western Springs
- Worth

== See also ==
- List of Illinois area codes
- List of North American Numbering Plan area codes

Illinois area codes: 217/447, 309/861, 312, 630/331, 618/730, 708/464, 773, 815/779, 847/224, 872
	North: 847/224, 773	
West: 815/779, 630/331	708/464	East: 219, 773/872
	South: 815/779	
Indiana area codes: 219, 260, 317/463, 574, 765, 812/930
