= Area code 872 =

Telephone overlay area code in Chicago, Illinois

Coordinates: 41°52′48″N 87°37′54″W

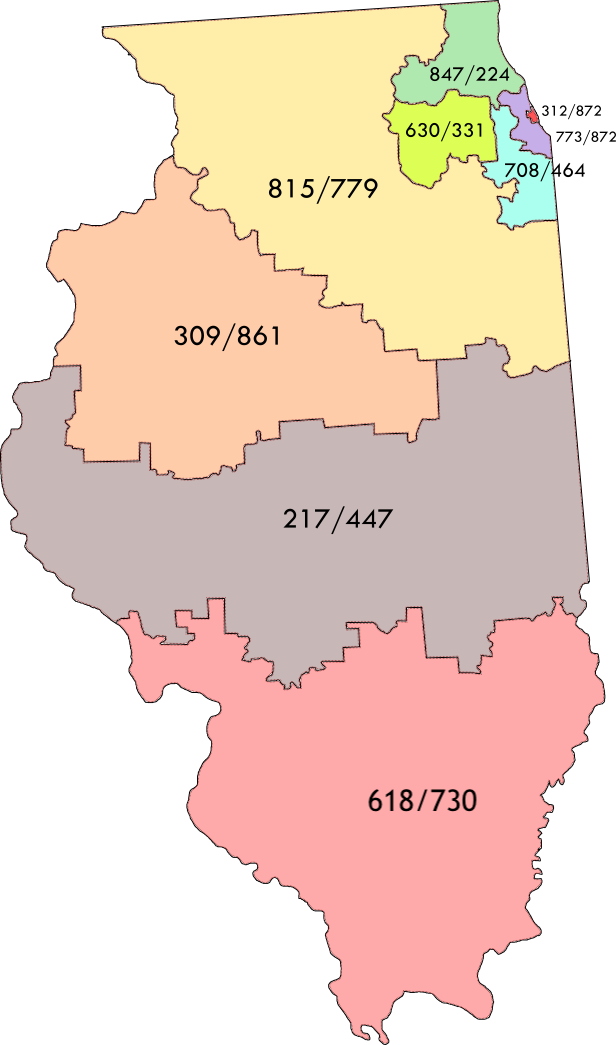
All NPAs within Illinois

Area code 872 is a telephone area code in the North American Numbering Plan for Chicago in the U.S. state of Illinois. It is an overlay code for a numbering plan area that comprises those of area codes 312 and 773. The overlay commenced service on November 7, 2009. It is the third overlay area code in the region and the tenth area code to serve northeast Illinois.

As early as 1998, the North American Numbering Plan Administration had recommended a third area code for Chicago, estimating that 312 and 773 would both be exhausted by 2001. However, the Illinois Commerce Commission implemented a series of conservation measures that staved off the need for a new area code. By 2008, a combination of population growth and a large growth in cell phone usage forced the implementation of 872.

With the implementation of 872, all local calls in Chicago must be dialed with the full 11-digit phone number (10 digits from cell phones).

The Illinois side of the Chicago area–312/773/872, 708/464, 847/224, 630/331 and portions of 815/779–is one of the largest local calling areas in the United States; with few exceptions, no long-distance charges are applied from one portion of the metro area to another.

== See also ==
- List of Illinois area codes
- List of North American Numbering Plan area codes

Illinois area codes: 217/447, 309/861, 312, 630/331, 618/730, 708/464, 773, 815/779, 847/224, 872
| | North: 847/224 | |
| West: 708/464, 630/331 | 872 / 312 / 773 | East: 219, Lake Michigan |
| | South: 708/464 | |
Indiana area codes: 219, 260, 317/463, 574, 765, 812/930
