= Original North American area codes =

Telephone area code history of North America

The original North American area codes were established by the American Telephone and Telegraph Company (AT&T) in 1947. The assignment was in accord with the design of a uniform nationwide telephone numbering plan that supported the goal of dialing any telephone in the nation without involvement of operators at each routing step of a telephone call from origination location to its destination. The new technology had the aim of speeding the connecting times for long-distance calling by eliminating the intermediary telephone operators and reducing cost. It was initially designed and implemented for Operator Toll Dialing, in which operators at the origination point would dial the call as instructed by service subscribers, but had also the benefit of preparing the nation for Direct Distance Dialing (DDD) by customers years later. The nationwide and continental application followed the demonstration of regional Operator Toll Dialing in Philadelphia during the World War II period.

The new numbering plan established a uniform destination addressing and call routing system for all telephone networks in North America which had become an essential public service. The project mandated the conversion of all local telephone numbers in the system to consist of a three-character central office code and a four-digit station number.

The initial "Nationwide Numbering Plan" of 1947 established 86 numbering plan areas (NPAs) that principally conformed to existing U.S. state and Canadian provincial boundaries, but 16 states and provinces were subdivided further. Forty NPAs were mapped to entire states or provinces. Each NPA was identified by a three-digit area code used as a prefix to each local telephone number. The United States received 77 area codes, and Canada nine. The initial system of numbering plan areas and area codes was expanded rapidly during the ensuing decades, and established the North American Numbering Plan (NANP).

== Historical context ==
Early in the 20th century, the American and Canadian telephone industry had established criteria and circuits for sending telephone calls across the vast number of local telephone networks on the continent to permit users to call others in many remote places in both countries. By 1930, this resulted in the establishment of the General Toll Switching Plan, a systematic approach and network with technical specifications for routing calls between two major classes of routing centers, Regional Centers and Primary Outlets, as well as thousands of minor interchange points and tributaries. Calls were forwarded manually between stations by long-distance operators who used the method of ringdown to command remote operators to accept calls on behalf of customers. This required long call set-up times with several intermediate operators involved. For initiating a call, the originating party would typically have to hang up and be called back by an operator once the call was established.

The introduction of the first Western Electric No. 4 Crossbar Switching System in Philadelphia to commercial service, in August 1943, automated the process of forwarding telephone calls between regional switching points. For the Bell System this was the first test to let their long-distance operators dial calls directly to potentially distant telephones. While automatic switching decreased the connection times from as much as 15 minutes to approximately two minutes for calls between far-away locations, each intermediate operator still had to determine special routing codes unique to their location for each call. To make a nationwide dialing network an efficient, practical reality, a uniform nationwide numbering plan was needed so that each telephone on the continent had a unique address that could be used independently from where a call originated. Such a methodology is called destination routing.

With this goal, AT&T developed a new framework during the early 1940s, termed Operator Toll Dialing, which was begun by the installation of a newly developed toll switching system in Philadelphia in 1943. In 1945, the American Telephone and Telegraph Company declared this effort a major post-war project for the Bell System, and proceeded with periodical communications to the general telecommunication industry via the Dial Interexchange Committee of the United States Independent Telephone Association (USITA), which disseminated the project's progress to its members via industry journals and conference contributions. The planning transitioned to implementation, when Ralph Mabbs presented the results in a talk at the 50th anniversary meeting of the Independent Telephone Association, on October 14, 1947.

A fundamental requirement for the success of automated toll dialing was a new telephone numbering plan, which became known as the Nationwide Numbering Plan. This numbering plan accounted initially for 77 area codes in the United States and nine in Canada. With the build-out and detailed analysis of existing technical infrastructure for toll dialing, the allocation maps needed to be modified in many states, adding numerous additional area codes during the next decade. By 1975, the numbering plan was known as the North American Numbering Plan, as efforts were in progress to expand the system beyond the United States and Canada.

== Numbering plan requirements ==
Building a nationwide network in which any telephone could be dialed directly from anywhere in the country required a systematic numbering system that was easy to understand and communicate. Existing local telephone numbers varied greatly across the country, from two or three digits in very small communities, to seven in the large cities.

By the time Bell Laboratories engineers began efforts to involve the broader industry bodies in 1945, local experiences had been studied in Pennsylvania and concepts had been developed for nationwide operator toll dialing. A crucial requirement was the conversion of all participating telephone networks to a universal numbering plan. In 1947, Ralph Mabbs recalled the specifications for this numbering plan as follows:

- A distinctive telephone number for each telephone across the continent
- The minimum number of digits which will still provide for growth and new services
- Minimum changes in customers' numbers
- Minimum changes in local dialing practices
- Least cost for equipment changes
- Minimum reference by operators to bulletins and route guides to gain speed of service advantages
- Provisions for operators to directly reach other operators at distant toll centers

Based on the precedent and experience with the large-city dial systems in the nation, the designers decided to direct all telephone companies to standardize the local telephone networks to seven-digit local telephone numbers before they could participate in operator toll dialing. This required few or no changes in the nation's largest cities, but in the smaller communities the shorter telephone numbers had to be padded with additional digits in a transparent, easily understandable manner, so that extra digits were not always needed when dialing other local subscribers.

By 1955, AT&T disseminated a formal publication of network documentation, specifications, and recommendations to the telephone industry, entitled Notes on Nationwide Dialing, a practice that was continued with updated editions until the beginning of the following century.

== Central office prefixes ==
Telephone dial number card of c.1948 with the local telephone number 4-5876 in Atlantic City, NJ, using the central office prefix 4, later converted to AT4

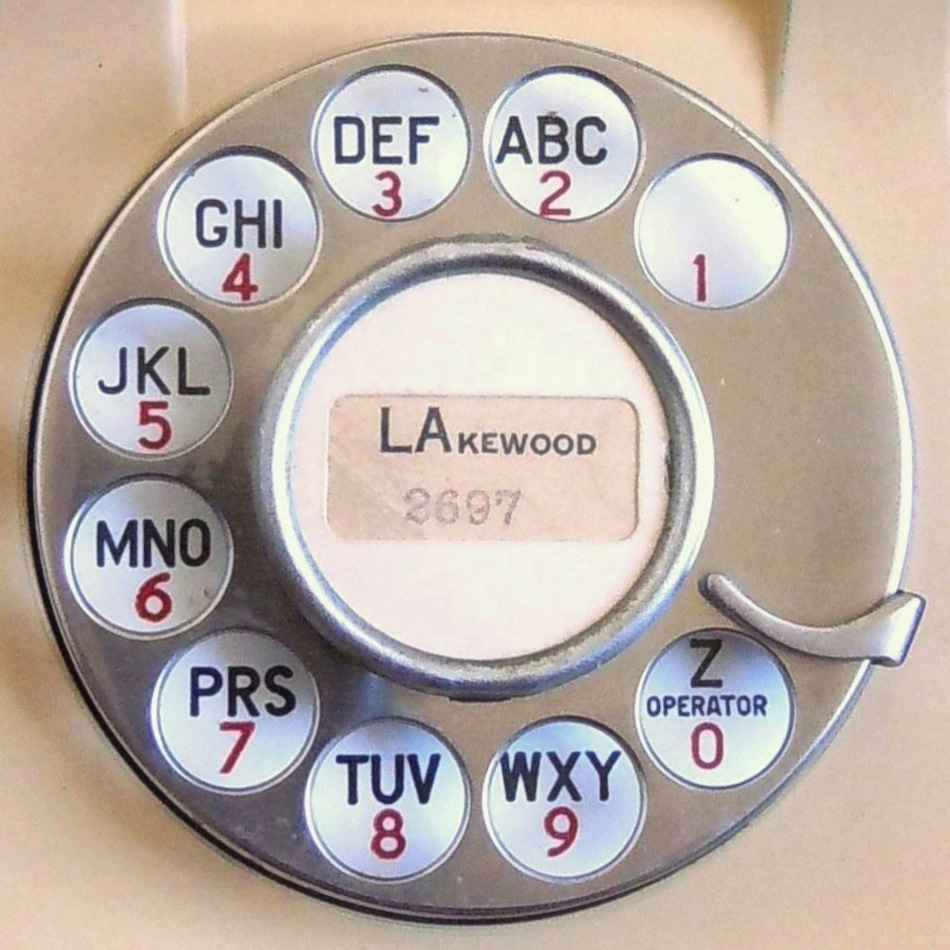
Face of a 1939 rotary telephone dial with the telephone number LA-2697, which includes the first two letters of Lakewood, New Jersey, as the central office prefix, later converted to LA6.

Most automatic dial switching systems were designed since the early 1920s to provide service for up to ten thousand subscriber lines for a complement of four digits in all telephone numbers. Each of these switching systems constituted a local telephone exchange, formally known as a central office.

Larger communities required multiple central offices to satisfy the service needs of their population. To accommodate more than 10,000 telephone lines in a city for automatic dial service, extra digits were added to the telephone number, preceding the line number. Such extra digits identified a specific central office in the area to which the desired destination was connected. They served as routing codes to those central offices. In places without automatic routing between central offices, a subscriber dialed the operator and asked for the destination at a specific central office, typically by the exchange name that was associated with each switching system. In automatic service regions, the exchange name, or central office name, could be dialed by the initial one, two, or three letters, as letters were arranged with the numeric equivalent on each telephone dial. Central office prefixes had already been used in the cities' dial systems since the 1920s, but only the largest of cities used three digits or letters.

This practice of dialing central office prefixes and users' familiarity of the system was preserved in the initial formulation of the new numbering plan, but was standardized to a format of using two letters and one digit in the prefix, resulting in the format 2L–5N (two letters and five numerals) for the subscriber telephone number.

For most cities, this conversion required the addition of extra digits or letters to the existing central office prefix. For example, the Atlantic City, New Jersey, telephone number 4-5876 was converted to AT4-5876 in the 1950s. Complete replacement of existing prefixes was necessary in the case of conflicts with another office in the state. Duplication of central office names, or an identical mapping of two different names to digits, was not uncommon. In practice, the conversion of the nation to this numbering plan took decades to accomplish and was not complete before the alphanumeric number format was abandoned during the 1960s in favor of all-number calling (ANC).

In addition to the central offices that provided the subscriber line for each telephone (wire centers), the toll routing system included special switching facilities that exclusively routed long-distance calls between end offices. Each of these toll offices also received an assignment of a unique three-digit toll office code. To reach another operator in another central office or toll office, an operator dialed only the office code of the destination.

== Numbering plan areas ==
By 1945, initial concepts for a nationwide numbering plan anticipated a division of the continent into between 50 and 75 numbering plan areas (NPAs). For this size of the network, a unique two-digit code for each numbering plan area would have been sufficient. However, AT&T wanted to preserve existing dialing practices for subscribers who only dialed the local telephone number for local calls. It was therefore necessary to distinguish the NPA codes from central office codes automatically by the switching system. Previous practice also dictated that central office codes could not have the digits 0 and 1 in either of the first two positions, because no letters were mapped to those to represent exchange names and switching systems automatically suppressed single (spurious) loop interruptions (corresponding to digit 1). Dialing 0 was already used to reach an operator or long-distance desk. This was the opportunity for automatic distinction of NPA codes from central office prefixes, but only when 0 or 1 were used in the second position of the NPA code.

Therefore, numbering plan area codes, often termed just area codes, were defined to have three digits, with the middle digit being 0 or 1. Initially, area codes with the middle digit 0 were assigned to numbering plan areas that comprised an entire state or province, while jurisdictions with multiple numbering plan areas received area codes having 1 as the second digit. As network growth and routing changes could not be predicted accurately over more than a few years, this pattern was abandoned by 1956, when call routing into New Jersey was divided between two toll centers.

The geographic layout of numbering plan areas across the North American continent was chosen primarily according to national, state, and territorial boundaries in the United States and Canada. While originally considered, no numbering plan area in the United States included more than a single state, but in Canada NPA 902 comprised all three provinces of The Maritimes in the far east. The largest states, and some states with suitable call routing infrastructure were divided into smaller entities, resulting in 16 states and provinces that were subdivided further, creating 46 NPAs. Forty NPAs were assigned to entire states or provinces.

1947 division of the North American continent into 86 numbering plan areas

The original configuration of the continental numbering plan assigned 86 area codes in October 1947, one each to every numbering plan area.

The territories of the United States, which included Alaska and Hawaii, did not receive area codes at first, nor did the territories of Canada or Newfoundland and Labrador, which was a British dominion at the time.

The following table enumerates the assigned numbering plan area codes of 1947 and their general geographic location.

Area code	Numbering plan area location
201	New Jersey
202	District of Columbia
203	Connecticut
204	Manitoba
205	Alabama
206	Washington
207	Maine
208	Idaho
212	New York City
213	Southern California, including Los Angeles and San Diego
214	Northeastern Texas, including Dallas/Fort Worth
215	Southeastern Pennsylvania, including Philadelphia
216	Northeastern Ohio, including Cleveland
217	Central Illinois
218	Minnesota, excluding southeastern part with Minneapolis
301	Maryland
302	Delaware
303	Colorado
304	West Virginia
305	Florida
306	Saskatchewan
307	Wyoming
312	Northeastern Illinois, including Chicago
313	Southeastern Michigan, including Detroit
314	Eastern Missouri, including St. Louis
315	Central upstate New York, including Syracuse
316	Southern Kansas, including Wichita
317	Northern Indiana, including Indianapolis
319	Eastern Iowa
401	Rhode Island
402	Nebraska
403	Alberta
404	Georgia
405	Oklahoma
406	Montana
412	Western Pennsylvania, including Pittsburgh
413	Western Massachusetts, including Springfield
414	Southern and northeastern Wisconsin, including Milwaukee
415	Northern-central California, including San Francisco and Sacramento
416	Ontario, including Toronto
418	Eastern Quebec, including Québec City
419	Northwest Ohio, including Toledo
501	Arkansas
502	Kentucky
503	Oregon
504	Louisiana
505	New Mexico
512	Central and southern Texas, including Austin and San Antonio)
513	Southwest Ohio, including Cincinnati
514	Western Quebec, including Montreal
515	Central Iowa, including Des Moines
517	South-central Michigan, including Lansing
518	Northeastern New York, including Albany
601	Mississippi
602	Arizona
603	New Hampshire
604	British Columbia
605	South Dakota
612	Southeastern Minnesota, including Minneapolis
613	Ontario, including Ottawa
614	Southeastern Ohio, including Columbus
616	Western Michigan, including Grand Rapids and the Upper Peninsula
617	Eastern Massachusetts, including Boston
618	Southern Illinois, including East St. Louis
701	North Dakota
702	Nevada
703	Virginia
704	North Carolina
712	Western Iowa, including Sioux City
713	Southeastern Texas, including Houston
715	Northern Wisconsin
716	Western New York, including Buffalo and Rochester
717	Eastern Pennsylvania, excluding the Delaware and Lehigh valleys
801	Utah
802	Vermont
803	South Carolina
812	Southern Indiana
814	Northwestern and central Pennsylvania
815	Northern Illinois, excluding Chicago and the Quad Cities
816	Northwestern Missouri, including Kansas City
901	Tennessee
902	Nova Scotia, Prince Edward Island, and New Brunswick
913	Northern Kansas, including Kansas City, Kansas
914	Southern New York, including Long Island but excluding New York City
915	Western Texas, including El Paso
916	Northern California, north of Sacramento

== Assignment plan ==
States and provinces with multiple NPAs
New York	212, 315, 518, 716, 914
Illinois	217, 312, 618, 815
Ohio	216, 419, 513, 614
Pennsylvania	215, 412, 717, 814
Texas	214, 512, 713, 915
California	213, 415, 916
Iowa	319, 515, 712
Michigan	313, 517, 616
Indiana	317, 812
Kansas	316, 913
Massachusetts	413, 617
Minnesota	218, 612
Missouri	314, 816
Wisconsin	414, 715
Ontario	416, 613
Quebec	418, 514

The number of central offices that could be effectively installed with a numbering plan with two letters and one digit in the central office code was expected to be approximately 500, because acceptable names for central offices had to be selected carefully to avoid miscommunication. States or provinces that required this many offices had to be divided into multiple smaller areas. Next to size, another important aspect was the existing infrastructure for call routing, which had developed during preceding decades independently of state or municipal boundaries. Routing traffic between numbering plan areas required a special toll switching system (Class-4 switch) in each numbering plan area. Planning the divisions avoided cutting busy toll traffic routes, so that most toll traffic remained within an area, and outgoing traffic from one area would not be tributary to toll offices in an adjacent area. However, it was recognized already in 1930 with the experience gained from the General Toll Switching Plan that too little granularity in the geographic allocation pattern of major toll switching points introduced expensive traffic back-haul requirements, conceivably resulting in congestion of the routes to the centers.

Consideration of several assignment patterns resulted in the configuration that was publicized in a map in October 1947. The three-digit codes were assigned to numbering plan areas in seemingly random manner, avoiding consecutive, nearly-consecutive, or just very similar codes in neighboring numbering plan areas to avoid customer confusion, even when located in the same jurisdiction. This criterion was not always achieved, however. A geographically based enumeration method had been examined earlier, but was discarded. Thus, it would not have been possible to locate a numbering plan area geographically by its code alone. The plan divided New York into five areas, the most of any state. Illinois, Ohio, Pennsylvania, and Texas were assigned four area codes each, and California, Iowa, and Michigan received three. Eight states and provinces were divided into two NPAs.

The pattern of this assignment of area codes is shown in the following tabulation. This method of arrangement, which is known to have been in use at Bell Laboratories, shows that area codes were assigned not entirely in random order, but by filling the table in diagonal manner from the top left corner, containing the low-numbered area codes, toward the center and lower right corner. Such a pattern suggests that the designers intended to maintain the same degree of randomness in digits for the remaining, yet unassigned codes. The first area code (201) was given to the entire state of New Jersey, the state with the greatest population density in the nation. Despite its density, the state was not subdivided until much later. In fact, in the group of single-NPA states, having the middle digit 0, all of the low-number codes were assigned to the mid-Atlantic states around New Jersey, i.e. the District of Columbia (202), Connecticut (203), Maryland (301), Delaware (302), and Rhode Island (401), all states in the top of the list of states with the greatest population densities.

	Single-NPA states and provinces										Multi-NPA states and provinces									
N	N00	N01	N02	N03	N04	N05	N06	N07	N08	N09	N10	N11	N12	N13	N14	N15	N16	N17	N18	N19
2	†	NJ	DC	CT	MB	AL	WA	ME	ID		†	†	NY	CA	TX	PA	OH	IL	MN	
3	†	MD	DE	CO	WV	FL	SK	WY			†	†	IL	MI	MO	NY	KS	IN		IA
4	†	RI	NE	AB	GA	OK	MT				†	†	PA	MA	WI	CA	ON		QC	OH
5	†	AR	KY	OR	LA	NM					†	†	TX	OH	QC	IA		MI	NY	
6	†	MS	AZ	NH	BC	SD					†	†	MN	ON	OH		MI	MA	IL	
7	†	ND	NV	VA	NC						†	†	IA	TX		WI	NY	PA		
8	†	UT	VT	SC							†	†	IN		PA	IL	MO			
9	†	TN	NB; NS PE								†	†		KS	NY	TX	CA			
Notes: † Special dialing codes (not permitted as area codes)–Area codes could not begin with N=0 or 1, or end in 0

In this table, the assignments of the nine area codes to the Canadian provinces are highlighted by a blue background.

=== Regional centers ===
Regional Centers (x = 0 (red) / 1 (pink)
N	Nx2	Nx3	Nx4	Nx5
2	New York City; NY_{212}	Los Angeles; CA_{213}	Dallas; TX_{214}	
3	Chicago; IL_{312}	Denver; CO_{303}	St. Louis; MO_{314}	
4	Pittsburgh; PA_{412}		Atlanta; GA_{404}	San Francisco; CA_{415}

The red fields are the NPAs that hosted the Regional Centers for toll-switching established in the General Toll Switching Plan of 1929: New York City (212), Los Angeles (213), Dallas (214), Chicago (312), St. Louis (314), and San Francisco (415) in the multi-NPA states, and in Denver (303) and Atlanta (404) in states with just a single area code each. Pittsburgh (412) became a Regional Center before 1952. These NPAs are clustered in the upper left corner, especially in the multiple-NPA table, but area codes 303 and 404 also fit neatly into the corresponding white positions of the N1X table, so that the Regional Center formed a closed block when ignoring the middle digit. Area codes were initially conceived as two-digit codes in c. 1945, and the middle digit (0 or 1) of the three-digits codes was added later for automatic distinction of area codes from central office codes.

The assignments of these Regional Centers in the upper left corner block of the table was complemented by adjacent NPA assignments to the toll centers in Philadelphia (215), which had already been served by a No. 4 Crossbar toll switch since 1943 for regional toll service. and in Detroit (313), serving the busy toll route to Toronto.

=== Reserved codes ===
The codes of the forms N00, N10, and N11, where N is 2 through 9, were not available for assignment as area codes at the time, but were considered as special codes, leaving a total of 136 possible combinations. The series N00 was used later for non-geographic numbers, starting with intrastate toll-free 800-numbers for Inward Wide Area Telephone Service (WATS) in 1965. N10 numbers became teletypewriter exchanges, and N11 were used as short-code dialing sequences for special services, such as information and emergency services. Thus, 201 and 212 of adjacent New Jersey and New York, respectively, in the top-left corners of the tables were the first two available area codes of the new numbering plan, representing two states that were already interconnected by many local toll routes with established direct dialing by subscribers.

== Implementation and expansion ==
For several years, area codes could be used only for Operator Toll Dialing by long-distance operators on routes between toll offices equipped with trunk code translation equipment. This absent, operators still had to rely on route operators and office-specific trunk codes, or employ the previous method of ringdown forwarding between intermediate operators. For entering the destination codes and telephone numbers into newly designed machine-switching equipment, long-distance operators did not use the slow rotary dials, but a 10-button key set, operating at least twice as fast, which transmitted multi-frequency (MF) tone pulses over regular voice channels to the remote switching systems. Such channels were incapable of transmitting the direct-current pulses of a rotary dial beyond a single link. All existing toll switching offices, many still using direct-control (step-by-step) methods, had to be supplemented with components to permit MF signaling and automatic route selection.

In December 1948, AT&T advanced the new long-distance technology with the cutover of new crossbar switching systems for toll-dialing in New York and Chicago, which added new technology to the No. 4 Crossbar Switching System, first installed in Philadelphia in 1943. This enabled operators to place calls directly to distant telephones without additional operators en route to some 300 cities, and resulted in the handling of about 10 percent of all Bell System long-distance calling by Operator Toll Dialing. On average, it took about two minutes for any long-distance call to be completed to its destination. As foreseen and stated in 1949, the target goal for call completion, after full implementation of the system across the nation, was one minute.

As new switching systems came online and design and manufacture of other routing infrastructure proceeded, the implementation of the new numbering plan advanced and several numbering plan areas were redrawn or added during subsequent years. In 1948, northern Indiana received an extra area code (219) for its Chicago suburbs by dividing area code 317. In 1950, southwest Missouri, with a new toll-center in Joplin, received area code 417, a change that provided more central offices in Kansas City. In 1951, the number of area codes grew to ninety: the State of New York gained area code 516 on Long Island, and Southern California received area code 714, to reduce the numbering plan area of Los Angeles.

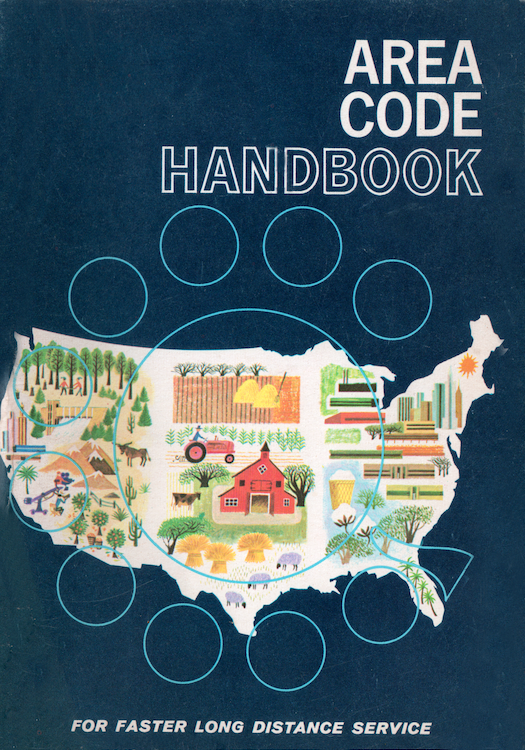
Area code handbook issued by many telephone companies in 1962 to promote the newly introduced direct distance dialing

By 1951, a new Class-5 switching system, the No.5 Crossbar, had proven successful in Media, Pennsylvania, and automatic message accounting (AMA) became available for billing telephone calls. The switching system was capable of handling the dialing of as many as 11 digits by subscribers. In Englewood, New Jersey, such a system was linked to a toll-class switch with the first commercial transistor circuitry that enabled the system to automatically translate area codes into toll trunk codes. On November 10, 1951, the system commenced a customer trial of direct distance dialing (DDD) from this single location in the country with access to about 11 million telephone subscribers in 10 metropolitan areas (Boston, Chicago, Cleveland, Detroit, Milwaukee, Oakland, Philadelphia, Pittsburgh, Providence, Sacramento, San Francisco) across the nation.

From the customer dialing experience in the Englewood DDD trials, Bell Laboratories engineers gained the confidence to predict that customers would use the new numbering plan with a reasonable degree of convenience and accuracy. As a result a second installation of DDD was planned for Washington, D.C. for the Fall of 1953, with the improvement of centralized AMA (CAMA), over the previous local billing arrangement in Englewood.

After the success of these trials, expansion of the numbering plan accelerated with new crossbar systems and four new area codes in 1953, and seven in 1954. By the end of the decade 31 new area codes had been created in addition to the initial allotment of 86 in 1947 to satisfy the post-war surge in demand for telephone service.

While the first customer-dialed call using an area code was made in 1951, it took nearly fifteen years after the 1947 announcement of the new numbering plan that direct distance dialing was common in most cities. By then, some of the initial criteria for assignment, such as the 0/1 rule for single/multiple NPA assignments in a given state had to be abandoned by new requirements from population shifts and growth of communication services. In 1960, AT&T engineers, estimating that the capacity of the numbering plan would be exhausted by 1975, prepared for the next major advance in the evolution of the network by eliminating central office names, and introducing all-number calling (ANC). ANC, once supplemented by interchangeable central office codes during the 1970s, increased the number of central office prefixes possible in each numbering plan area from 540 to an eventual maximum of 792.

== See also ==
- List of future North American area codes
- List of North American Numbering Plan area codes
