= Area code 773 =

Area code in the U.S. state of Illinois

Coordinates: 41°52′48″N 87°37′54″W

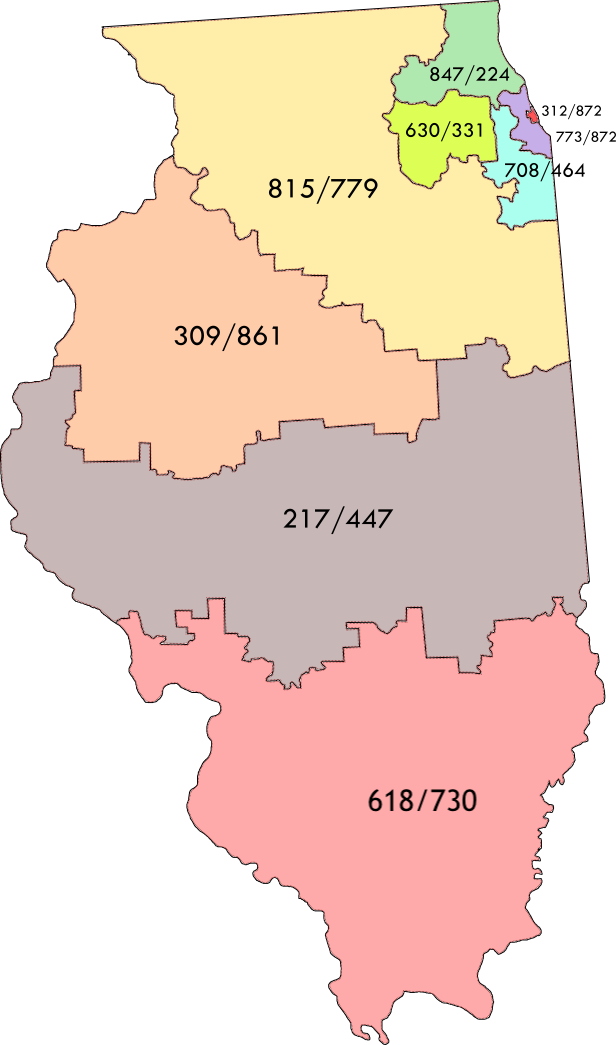
The numbering plan areas of Illinois

Area code 773 is a telephone area code in the North American Numbering Plan (NANP) in the U.S. state of Illinois. It serves the outer areas of Chicago, outside the Loop and the innermost neighborhoods.

Originally, all of Chicago and its suburbs used area code 312. In 1989, area code 708 was created for the suburbs, leaving the city with area code 312.

By the mid-1990s, Chicago's continued growth and the proliferation of cell phones and pagers made it apparent that the city needed a new area code. It was decided to split off all of the city outside the downtown area as 773. The new area code went into effect on October 12, 1996. Permissive dialing of 312 continued across Chicago until January 11, 1997. On August 10, 2007, the Illinois Commerce Commission announced that area code 872 would overlay area codes 312 and 773; it went into service on November 7, 2009.

The Illinois side of the Chicago area–312/773/872, 708, 847/224, 630/331 and portions of 815/779–is one of the largest local calling areas in the United States; with few exceptions, no long-distance charges are applied from one portion of the metro area to another.

Fictional Chicago chef Carmy Berzatto from The Bear TV series has a tattoo featuring 773.

== See also ==
- List of Illinois area codes
- List of North American Numbering Plan area codes

Illinois area codes: 217/447, 309/861, 312, 630/331, 618/730, 708/464, 773, 815/779, 847/224, 872
	North: 224/847	
West: 708	773	East: 312, 219, Lake Michigan
	South: 464/706	
Indiana area codes: 219, 260, 317/463, 574, 765, 812/930
