= Operator Toll Dialing =

North American telephone switching technology

Operator Toll Dialing was a telephone call routing and toll-switching system for the Bell System and the independent telephone companies in the United States and Canada that paved the way for direct distance dialing (DDD) by telephone service subscribers. Operator Toll Dialing was developed in the early 1940s for regional service and expanded nationwide by the end of the decade. It automated the switching and billing of long-distance calling, and drastically reduced the time callers had to wait for connection completion.

== Historical context ==
The concept and technology of Operator Toll Dialing evolved from the General Toll Switching Plan of 1929, and gained technical merits by the cutover of a new type of crossbar switching system (No. 4XB) in Philadelphia to commercial service in August 1943.

Operator Toll Dialing was the first system of its kind for automated forwarding of calls between toll switching centers. In Pennsylvania, it had served customers only for regional toll traffic. It established initial experience with automatic toll switching for the design of a nationwide effort that was sometimes referred to as Nationwide Operator Toll Dialing.

By the time of the first promotions of Nationwide Operator Toll Dialing to the general telecommunication industry in 1945, approximately 5% of the 2.7 million toll board calls per day were handled by the early incarnations of this system.

Operator Toll Dialing eliminated the need for intermediate operators to send toll calls to distant central offices. It also eliminated the inward operators for call completion to the local wire line. The technology involved stepwise routing of telephone calls from one toll center to another one that was logically closer to the destination. At each intermediate step the switch set up a circuit to a toll-center that was able to route the call one step closer to the call's destination and automatically directed the traffic around congested or failed routes via backup paths.

== Destination routing ==
An essential component for Operator Toll Dialing was the concept of destination routing, in which every toll center in the entire network uses a single, uniform code for each destination, rather than circuit identifiers unique to each regional switch. This required a uniform telephone numbering plan for all regional telephone networks across the continent.

=== Numbering plan areas ===
By 1947, a newly devised nationwide numbering plan established a geographic partitioning of the continent into numbering plan areas (NPAs), and designated the original North American area codes. An area code is a unique three-digit code serving as a destination routing code to a specific numbering plan area (NPA). This code was the same for all switching systems nationwide, and eliminated the need to publish specific trunk codes for each toll office to various destinations. The translation from NPA code to trunk codes was performed at each toll center without the need for any operator elsewhere to know the details. When automatic apparatus was installed for machine translation of the universal area codes to location-specific trunk codes, it freed operators from looking up trunk codes in directories to send the call one toll office closer to the destination telephone.

The geographic layout of numbering plan areas across the North American continent was chosen primarily according to national, state, and territorial boundaries in the United States and Canada. Some states or provinces needed to be divided into multiple areas. NPAs were created in accordance with principles deemed to maximize customer understanding and minimize dialing effort, while reducing plant cost.

=== Central offices ===
Within each NPA, central offices also received three-digit codes, unique only within the numbering plan area, so that each central office could be reached by a six-digit dialing prefix (NPA-XXX). Each central office had a maximum capacity of 10,000 telephone lines to the locations of end users in the exchange area. Thus, each telephone had a four-digit line number (0000–9999). Therefore, each telephone on the continent was uniquely identified by a telephone number of ten digits (area code–central office code–line number).

== Implementation ==
By the end of 1948, AT&T commenced the wider use of the system with the cutover of new crossbar switching systems for toll-dialing in New York and Chicago, which resulted in the handling of about ten percent of all Bell System long-distance calling by Operator Toll Dialing. Altogether, the toll networks enabled operators to place calls directly to distant telephones in some three hundred cities. On average, it took about two minutes for a long-distance call to be completed to its destination. As foreseen and stated in 1949, the target goal for call completion, after full implementation of the system across the nation, was one minute.

For entering the destination codes and telephone numbers into newly designed machine-switching equipment, long-distance operators did not use a slow rotary dials, but a ten-button key set, operating at least twice as fast, which transmitted tone pulses (multi-frequency signaling) over regular voice channels to the remote switching centers. Such channels were incapable of transmitting the direct-current pulses of a rotary dial.

Operator Toll Dialing was gradually supplemented and superseded by direct distance dialing (DDD) in the decades following. With DDD, customers themselves dialed an area code followed by a seven-digit telephone number to initiate long-distance calls without operator assistance. Activated first in 1951 for about ten thousand customers in Englewood, New Jersey, DDD was available in the major cities by the early 1960s, but was not fully implemented until the 1970s.

== See also ==
- Notes on the Network
- Trunk prefix
- Subscriber trunk dialling (STD)
