= Area codes 816 and 975 =

Area code in northwestern Missouri, United States

Coordinates: 39°12′N 94°24′W

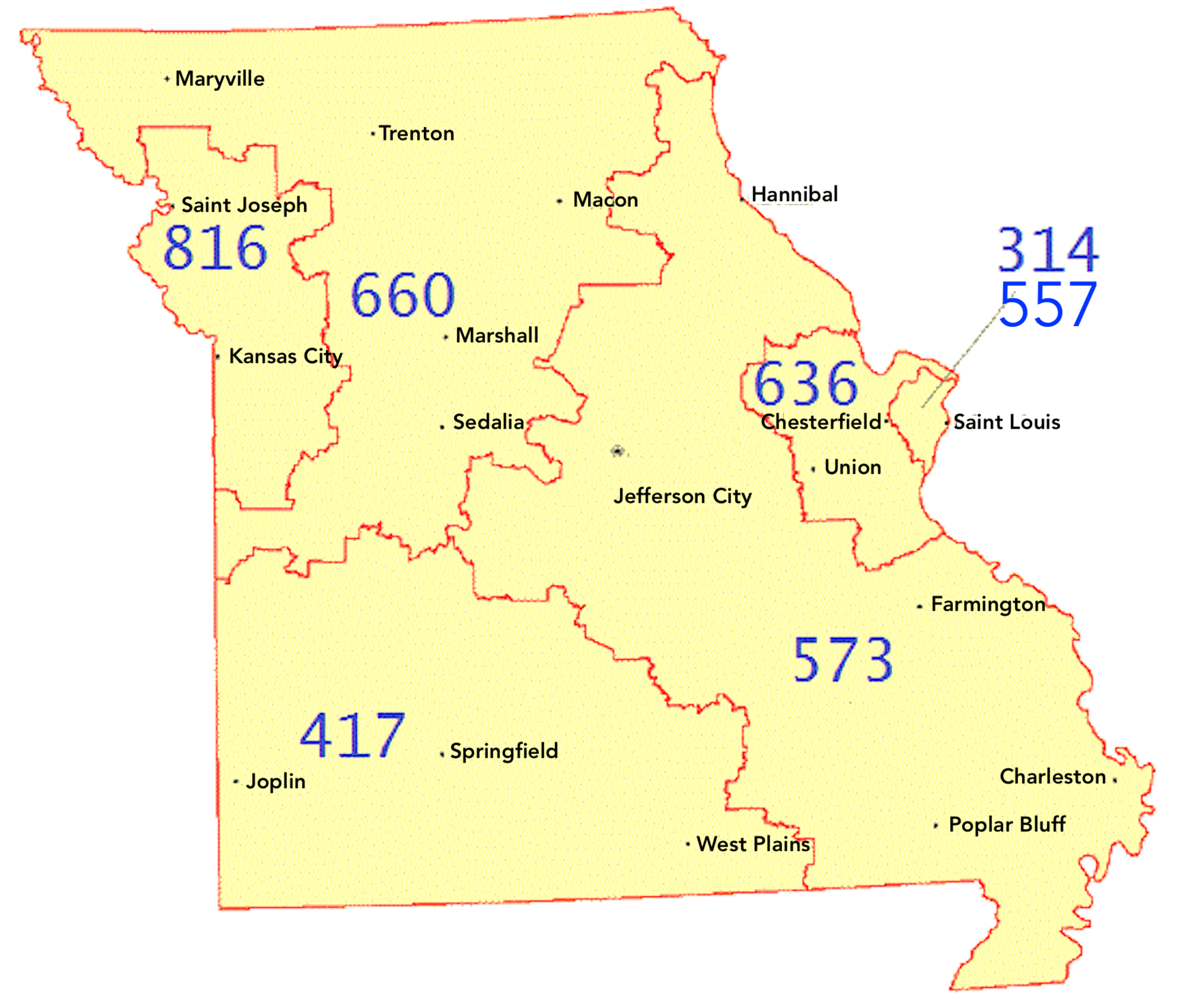

Area codes 816 and 975 are telephone area codes in the North American Numbering Plan (NANP) for most of the Missouri side of the Kansas City metropolitan area, the St. Joseph area, and all or part of fifteen surrounding counties in northwestern Missouri.

Upon its establishment as one of the original 86 area codes in 1947, area code 816 designated the western part of Missouri. bordering Arkansas, Illinois, Iowa, Kansas, Nebraska, and Oklahoma. The numbering plan area was reduced in 1950 and 1997 and converted to an overlay complex with area code 975 in 2002.

== History ==
When the American Telephone and Telegraph Company (AT&T) created a universal North American telephone numbering plan for Operator Toll Dialing in 1947, Missouri was divided into two numbering plan areas (NPAs). Area code 816 served points generally north and west of Columbia and Jefferson City, while area code 314 served the eastern third of the state, including St. Louis. In 1950, a third NPA with area code 417 was created for southwestern Missouri, including the cities of Branson, Joplin, and Springfield. This reduced 816 to the northern third of Missouri, including the Kansas City metropolitan area. Despite roughly doubling the population in the Kansas City metropolitan area during the second half of the 20th century, area code 816 retained its 1951 boundaries for 45 years.

By late 1996, the proliferation of cell phones and market reforms related to deregulation by the Telecommunications Act of 1996 required an additional area code for northern Missouri. On April 10, 1997, Southwestern Bell declared a Jeopardy Situation with the Missouri Public Service Commission (MPSC), which oversees telecommunications in the state, and the North American Numbering Plan Administration (NANPA). On July 28, 1997, Bellcore and the NANPA, announced an area code split in which the Kansas City metropolitan area and the St. Joseph area would retain area code 816, while the remainder of the NPA would receive the new area code 660. Area code 660 comprised the rural eastern and northwestern portions of the then-current 816 area to minimize disruption to subscribers in the more densely populated urban areas. The rate centers of Lexington (259) and Warrensburg (429) moved to 660, despite being generally considered a part of the Kansas City area.

On June 4, 1997, the MPSC announced the split for October 12, 1997, when a permissive dialing period commenced, until April 19, 1998, during which long-distance calls to the 660 territory could be completed using either 816 or 660.

In 2000, the Missouri PSC announced plans to create an overlay plan for the numbering plan area. On February 20, 2001, the overlay was approved by the North American Numbering Plan Administration (NANPA), by assigning area code 975 for service starting October 20, 2001, which was later postponed to May 5, 2002. The subsequent implementation of code preservation measures, such as number pooling, eliminated the immediate need for additional central office prefixes, prompting the MPSC to suspend implementation indefinitely. Despite Kansas City's continued growth, the Kansas City area was served by only 816 for over twenty additional years.

Prior to October 2021, area code 816 had telephone numbers assigned for the central office code 988. In 2020, 988 was designated nationwide as a dialing code for the National Suicide Prevention Lifeline, which created a conflict for exchanges that permit seven-digit dialing. This area code was therefore scheduled to transition to ten-digit dialing by October 24, 2021.

An October 2021 exhaust analysis by the NANPA projected central office code exhaustion by 2023. As a result, an overlay with area code 975 was scheduled with an in-service date of October 13, 2023. As ten-digit dialing was already in place, a permissive dialing period was not necessary.

== Service area ==
=== Major cities ===
- Belton
- Blue Springs
- Gladstone
- Grandview
- Independence
- Kansas City
- Lee's Summit
- Liberty
- North Kansas City
- Raymore
- Raytown
- St. Joseph

=== Other cities ===
- Archie
- Bolckow
- Cameron
- Cleveland
- Dearborn
- Edgerton
- Ferrelview
- Freeman
- Garden City
- Gower
- Greenwood
- Harrisonville
- Henrietta
- Holden
- Kearney
- Lathrop
- Lawson
- Maysville
- Peculiar
- Platte City
- Plattsburg
- Pleasant Hill
- Richmond
- Savannah
- Smithville

Missouri area codes: 314/557, 417, 573/235, 636, 660, 816/975
	North: 660	
West: 785, 913	816/975	East: 660
	South: 660	
Kansas area codes: 316, 620, 785, 913
