= Area code 260 =

Telephone area code in northeast Indiana, United States

Coordinates: 41.080872°N 85.139219°W

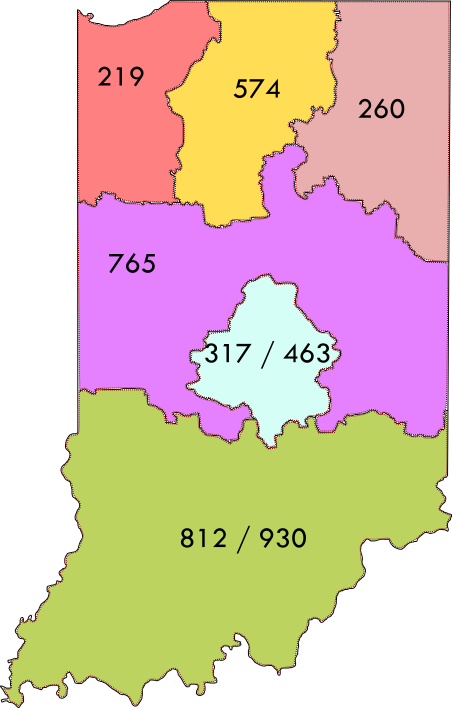
Area Code map for all of Indiana

Area code 260 is a telephone area code in the North American Numbering Plan (NANP) for the northeastern part of the U.S. state of Indiana. Cities in the service area include Angola, Auburn, Bluffton, Butler, Columbia City, Decatur, Fort Wayne, Garrett, Huntington, New Haven, and Wabash.

== History ==
In 1947, American Telephone and Telegraph (AT&T) published the first configuration of proposed numbering plan areas (NPAs) for a new nationwide numbering and toll call routing system. Indiana was divided to receive two area codes. Area code 317 served the northern two-thirds of Indiana, while area code 812 served the southern third. In the first change of the original plan in 1948, 317 was cut back to central Indiana, while the northern third of Indiana, including Gary, Hammond, East Chicago, South Bend, Elkhart and Fort Wayne, received area code 219.

Eventual depletion of numbers in area code 219 in the late 1990s prompted a three-way split of 219. As the result of a random drawing, northwest Indiana retained 219, 574 was assigned to north-central Indiana, (including South Bend), and northeast Indiana received 260. The split took place on January 15, 2002, with mandatory dialing effective five months later.

== See also ==
- List of Indiana area codes
- List of North American Numbering Plan area codes

Indiana area codes: 219, 260, 317/463, 574, 765, 812/930
	North: 269, 517	
West: 574	260	East: 419/567, 326/937
	South: 765	
Michigan area codes: 231, 248/947, 269, 313/679, 517, 586, 616, 734, 810, 906, 989
Ohio area codes: 216, 330/234, 419/567, 440/436, 513/283, 614/380, 740/220, 937/326
