= Area code 574 =

Area code that serves South Bend and Mishawaka and north-central Indiana

Coordinates: 41.281935°N 86.421433°W

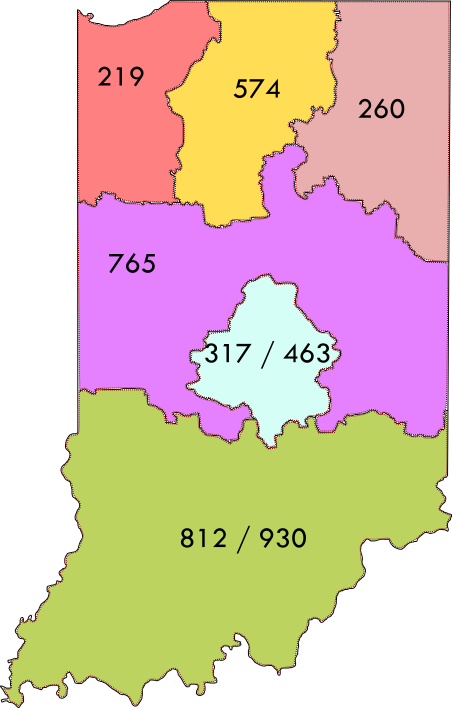
Area code map for all of Indiana

Area code 574 is a telephone area code in the North American Numbering Plan (NANP) for the northern part of the U.S. state of Indiana. It was created in a three-way area code split from area code 219 in 2002.

== History ==
In 1947, American Telephone and Telegraph (AT&T) published the first configuration of proposed numbering plan areas (NPAs) for a new nationwide numbering and toll call routing system. Indiana was divided to receive two area codes. Area code 317 served the northern two-thirds of Indiana, while area code 812 served the southern third. In the first change of the original plan in 1948, 317 was cut back to central Indiana, while the northern third of Indiana, including Gary, Hammond, East Chicago, South Bend, Elkhart and Fort Wayne, received area code 219.

The northern third of Indiana was served by area code 219 for 54 years. By the end of the 20th century, 219 was on the verge of exhaustion of central office prefixes. The decision was made to implement a three-way split of the 219 territory. As the result of a random drawing, the middle portion, surrounding South Bend, received area code 574. The eastern portion (Fort Wayne) became area code 260, while Northwest Indiana retained 219. The area codes split on January 15, 2002, with permissive dialing continuing until June 14, 2002.

Prior to October 2021, area code 574 had telephone numbers assigned for the central office code 988. In 2020, 988 was designated nationwide as a dialing code for the National Suicide Prevention Lifeline, which created a conflict for exchanges that permit seven-digit dialing. This area code was therefore scheduled to transition to ten-digit dialing by October 24, 2021.

== See also ==
- List of Indiana area codes
- List of North American Numbering Plan area codes

Indiana area codes: 219, 260, 317/463, 574, 765, 812/930
| | North: 269 | |
| West: 219 | 574 | East: 260 |
| | South: 765 | |
Michigan area codes: 231, 248/947, 269, 313/679, 517, 586, 616, 734, 810, 906, 989
