= Area code 417 =

Telephone area code for southwestern Missouri, United States

Coordinates: 37°N 93°W

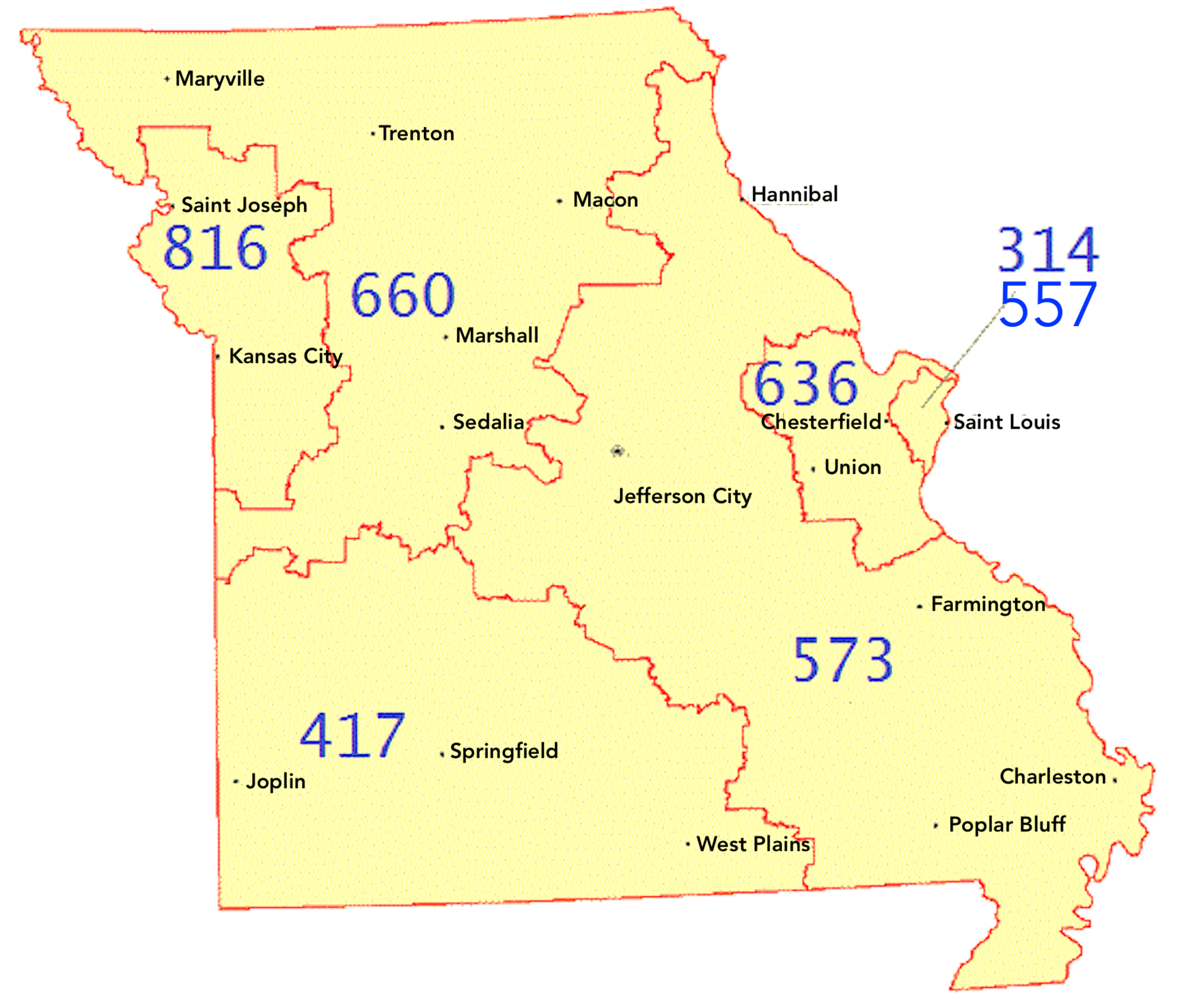

Area code 417 is a telephone area code in the North American Numbering Plan (NANP) for the southwestern quadrant of Missouri, including the cities of Branson, Carl Junction, Carthage, Joplin, Lebanon, Neosho, Newtonia, Nixa, Ozark, Springfield, and West Plains. Area code 417 was created in 1950 in a modification of Missouri's numbering plan areas, primarily from area code 816.

== History ==
When the American Telephone and Telegraph Company (AT&T) created a universal North American telephone numbering plan for Operator Toll Dialing in 1947, Missouri was divided into two numbering plan areas (NPAs). Area code 816 served points generally north and west of Columbia and Jefferson City, while area code 314 served the eastern third of the state, including St. Louis. In 1950, area code 417 was created as the third code in the state, for southwestern Missouri, comprising primarily the southern half of the original 816 area.

Despite the presence of Springfield, the state's third-largest city, 417 is one of the most sparsely populated numbering plan areas in the nation. According to 2025 projections, southwest Missouri will not need another area code until about 2037.

Prior to October 2021, area code 417 had telephone numbers assigned for the central office code 988. In 2020, 988 was designated nationwide as a dialing code for the National Suicide Prevention Lifeline, which created a conflict for exchanges that permit seven-digit dialing. This area code was therefore scheduled to transition to ten-digit dialing by October 24, 2021.

== See also ==
- List of North American Numbering Plan area codes

Missouri area codes: 314/557, 417, 573/235, 636, 660, 816/975
	North: 660, 573/235	
West: 620, 918/539	417	East: 573/235
	South: 479, 870/327	
Kansas area codes: 316, 620, 785, 913
Oklahoma area codes: 405/572, 580, 918/539
Arkansas area codes: 479, 501, 870/327
