= Area codes 317 and 463 =

Area codes in central Indiana

Coordinates: 39.768333°N 86.158056°W

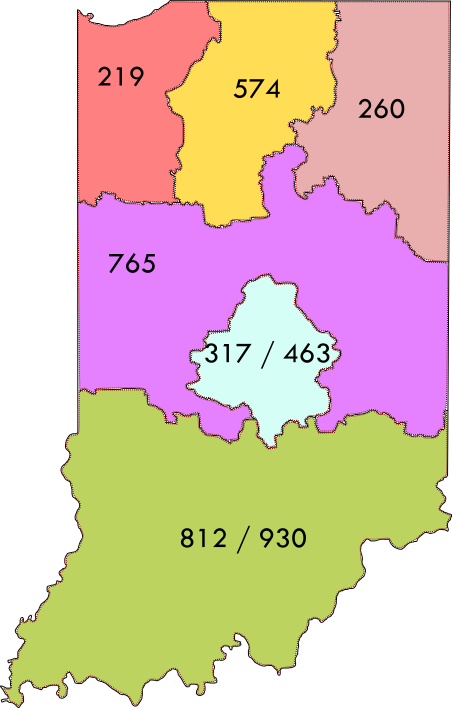
Area Code map for all of Indiana

Area codes 317 and 463 are telephone overlay area codes in the North American Numbering Plan (NANP) for Indianapolis and nine surrounding counties in central Indiana. The numbering plan area (NPA) comprises all or parts of Marion, Boone, Hancock, Hamilton, Hendricks, Johnson, Madison, Morgan, and Shelby counties. 317 is the original area code of the NPA, created in 1947, and 463 was added to the numbering plan area in 2016, making ten-digit dialing mandatory for all calls in the region.

== History ==
In 1947, American Telephone and Telegraph (AT&T) published the first configuration of proposed numbering plan areas (NPAs) for a new nationwide numbering and toll call routing system. Indiana was divided into two numbering plan areas. Area code 317 served the northern two-thirds of Indiana and area code 812 served the remaining southern part. The first change of the original plan occurred in 1948, when 317 was cut back to just central Indiana, while the northern third of Indiana, including Gary, Hammond, East Chicago, South Bend, Elkhart, and Fort Wayne, received area code 219.

Despite Indianapolis's rapid growth during the second half of the 20th century and the accompanying increased number demand, this configuration remained in place for 48 years. No changes were made to 317 until February 1, 1997, when most of the 317 territory outside of the inner ring of the Indianapolis metropolitan area was assigned to area code 765.

The proliferation of pagers and cell phones depleted the numbering resources of area code 317, so that it was expected to exhaust in 2017. The Indiana Regulatory Commission announced that area code 463 would be added in 2016 to form an overlay numbering plan. This was the second time that an area code in Indiana was overlaid, after area code 812 had been overlaid with area code 930 in March 2015.

Area code 463, which spells out IND on the alphanumeric telephone keypad, entered service on March 15, 2016. On that date, a permissive dialing period began during which both seven- and ten-digit dialing was possible. Ten-digit dialing was originally to become mandatory in the Indianapolis area on September 15, 2016. However, on August 31, in response to an appeal from security alarm companies, the deadline was extended to October 15, 2016.

== See also ==
- List of Indiana area codes
- List of North American Numbering Plan area codes

Indiana area codes: 219, 260, 317/463, 574, 765, 812/930
	North: 765	
West: 765	317/463	East: 765
	South: 812/930	
