= Area codes 847 and 224 =

Telephone area codes in Illinois, United States

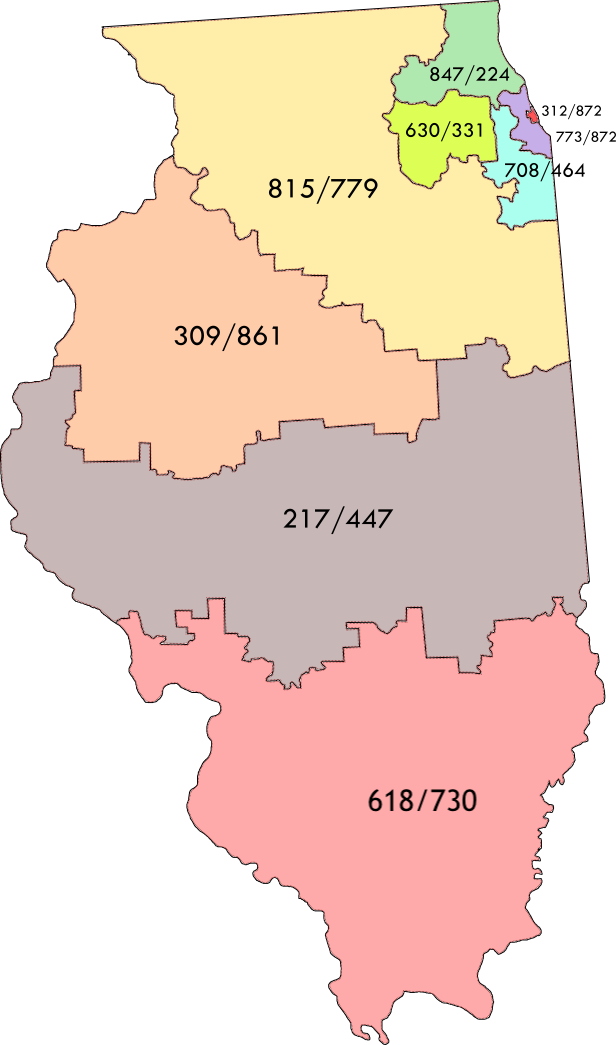
NPA codes of Illinois

Area codes 847 and 224 are telephone area codes in the North American Numbering Plan (NANP) for the U.S. state of Illinois. The numbering plan area (NPA) comprises the northeastern part of Illinois and many northern suburbs of Chicago. This includes most of Lake County, the northern part of Cook County, the northern part of Kane County, and a small part of McHenry County.

Area code 847 was created on January 20, 1996, in a three-way split of area code 708. Area code 847 was involved in the first trial of telephone number pooling in the United States in June 1998, to avert central office code exhaustion in the numbering plan area. Nevertheless, within only five years, 847 was already close to exhaustion from the rapid growth in telecommunication services in the Chicago suburbs and the proliferation of cell phones and pagers. On January 5, 2002, area code 224 was assigned to overlay area code 847. This required ten-digit dialing in all affected communities.

== Service area ==
- Algonquin
- Antioch
- Arlington Heights
- Bannockburn
- Barrington
- Barrington Hills
- Beach Park
- Buffalo Grove
- Burlington
- Carpentersville
- Cary
- Channel Lake
- Deerfield
- Deer Park
- Des Plaines
- East Dundee
- Elgin
- Elk Grove Village
- Evanston
- Forest Lake
- Fox Lake
- Fox Lake Hills
- Fox River Grove
- Franklin Park
- Gages Lake
- Gilberts
- Glencoe
- Glenview
- Golf
- Grandwood Park
- Grayslake
- Great Lakes, Illinois
- Green Oaks
- Gurnee
- Hainesville
- Hampshire
- Hawthorn Woods
- Highland Park
- Highwood
- Hoffman Estates
- Huntley
- Indian Creek
- Ingleside
- Island Lake
- Inverness
- Kenilworth
- Kildeer
- Knollwood
- Lake Barrington
- Lake Bluff
- Lake Catherine
- Lake Forest
- Lake in the Hills
- Lake Villa
- Lake Zurich
- Libertyville
- Lincolnshire
- Lincolnwood
- Lindenhurst
- Long Grove
- Long Lake
- Melrose Park
- Mettawa
- Morton Grove
- Mount Prospect
- Mundelein
- Niles
- North Barrington
- Northbrook
- North Chicago
- Oakwood Hills
- Old Mill Creek
- Palatine
- Park City
- Park Ridge
- Pingree Grove
- Port Barrington
- Prairie View
- Prospect Heights
- Riverwoods
- Rolling Meadows
- Rondout
- Rosemont
- Round Lake
- Round Lake Beach
- Round Lake Heights
- Round Lake Park
- Schiller Park
- Schaumburg
- Skokie
- Sleepy Hollow
- South Barrington
- South Elgin
- Third Lake
- Tower Lakes
- Trout Valley
- Venetian Village
- Vernon Hills
- Volo
- Wadsworth
- Wauconda
- Waukegan
- West Dundee
- Wheeling
- Wilmette
- Winnetka
- Winthrop Harbor
- Zion

== See also ==
- List of North American Numbering Plan area codes
- List of Illinois area codes

Illinois area codes: 217/447, 309/861, 312, 630/331, 618/730, 708/464, 773, 815/779, 847/224, 872
	North: 262	
West: 815/779	847/224	East: Lake Michigan
	South: 630/331, 708/464, 773	
Wisconsin area codes: 262, 414, 608/353, 715/534, 920/274
