= Area code 312 =

Area code of Downtown Chicago

Coordinates: 41°52′48″N 87°37′54″W

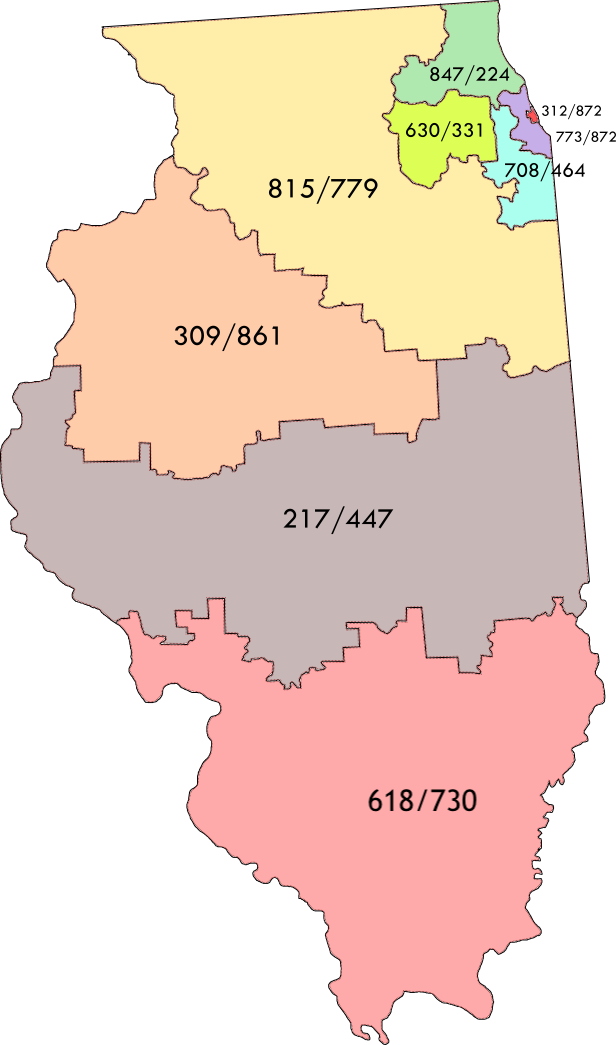
All NPAs within Illinois

Area code 312 is a telephone area code in the North American Numbering Plan for the city of Chicago, including downtown, the Chicago Loop, and its immediate environs. The numbering plan area is completely surrounded by area code 773, which serves the rest of Chicago. Both area codes form an overlay complex with area code 872. 312 is an enclave area code, and is roughly bounded by North Avenue on the north, Western Avenue on the west, and 35th Street on the south, with Lake Michigan to the east. In terms of geographic area covered, 312 is one of the smallest area codes in the nation, encompassing only a few square miles.

== History ==
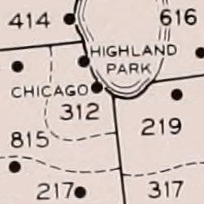
The original numbering plan area 312, as of 1947-1989

Area code 312 was assigned to one of the original 86 numbering plan areas (NPAs) created in 1947 for the North American Numbering Plan. As a result of Illinois' dense population, particularly in the north, the state was split between four NPAs, given that each NPA could only accommodate approximately 500 central offices.

Area code 312 originally served almost all of the Illinois side of the Chicago metropolitan area. The major exceptions were portions of Grundy, Kane, Kankakee, McHenry, and Will counties, which were located in the numbering plan area of the rest of northern Illinois, 815. On November 11, 1989, the suburbs were assigned area code 708 and 312 was reduced to Chicago.

The 1989 split was intended as a long-term solution to relieve exchanges in one of the largest toll-free calling zones in the nation. However, within only five years, 312 was on the verge of exhaustion once again due to the proliferation of cell phones, pagers and fax machines in the 1990s. Additionally, the Chicago LATA extends into northwest Indiana, meaning several numbers in Indiana's 219 were not available for use. This factor also forced 708 to be split in 1996, just seven years after it split from 312. 708 was retained for the southern suburbs, while the northern suburbs became 847 and the western suburbs became 630.

As a solution, all of the city outside the downtown area was split off as area code 773 on October 11, 1996, making Chicago one of the few cities in the nation to be split between multiple area codes, along with New York City and Los Angeles. It made the area code an enclave code, similar to area code 514 in Montreal and area code 210 in San Antonio. Since November 7, 2009, both 312 and 773 have been overlaid by 872. With the implementation of 872, even local calls in Chicago require ten-digit dialing.

The Illinois side of the Chicago area–312/773/872, 708/464, 847/224, 630/331 and portions of 815/779–is one of the largest local calling areas in the United States; with few exceptions, no long-distance charges are applied from one portion of the metro area to the other.

The first production #4ESS toll switch was installed in Chicago in January 1976.

== In popular culture ==
- Goose Island Brewery brews an ale named "312 Urban Wheat Ale" and "312 Urban Pale Ale".
- A restaurant at the Kimpton Hotels operated Hotel Allegro, at LaSalle and Randolph Streets in the Loop, is named "312 Chicago".
- The Chicago-based Christian rock group Resurrection Band released a song called "Area 312" on their 1982 album DMZ
- Portions of the film RoboCop 2 were filmed in the Chicago area. A telephone number written on an abandoned building is (312) 555-7890.
- The Snoop Dogg song "That's That", contains the lyrics: "Girl if you ever in the 312, holla at a playa".
- The Ludacris song "Area Codes" has 312 as one of the 43 area codes mentioned.
- The music project Radio Flyer used (312) as a track title.
- The Kanye West song "New God Flow," contains the lyrics: "What has the world come to, I'm from the 312, where cops don't come through, and dreams don't come true."
- The Disney Channel show Shake It Up, starring Bella Thorne, as Cecelia Grace "CeCe" Jones, and Zendaya, as Raquel "Rocky" Oprah Blue, mentions 312 as both Rocky and Cece's area code.
- A 1960s AT&T commercial promoted calling long distance with the jingle "3-1-2 .. 3-1-2 That toddlin town, that toddlin town". The jingle played upon "Chicago (That Toddlin' Town)" a popular song written by Fred Fisher and famously performed by Frank Sinatra.
- The Chicago hacking conference, started in 2009, known as THOTCON derived its name from the area code. The first two letters of the word “three”, the first letter of “one”, and the first letter of “two”.

== See also ==
- List of Illinois area codes
- List of North American Numbering Plan area codes

Illinois area codes: 217/447, 309/861, 312, 630/331, 618/730, 708/464, 773, 815/779, 847/224, 872
	North: 773	
West: 773	312, 872	East: Lake Michigan
	South: 773	
