= Area codes 630 and 331 =

Telephone area codes for the western suburbs of Chicago, Illinois

Coordinates: 41°50′N 88°06′W

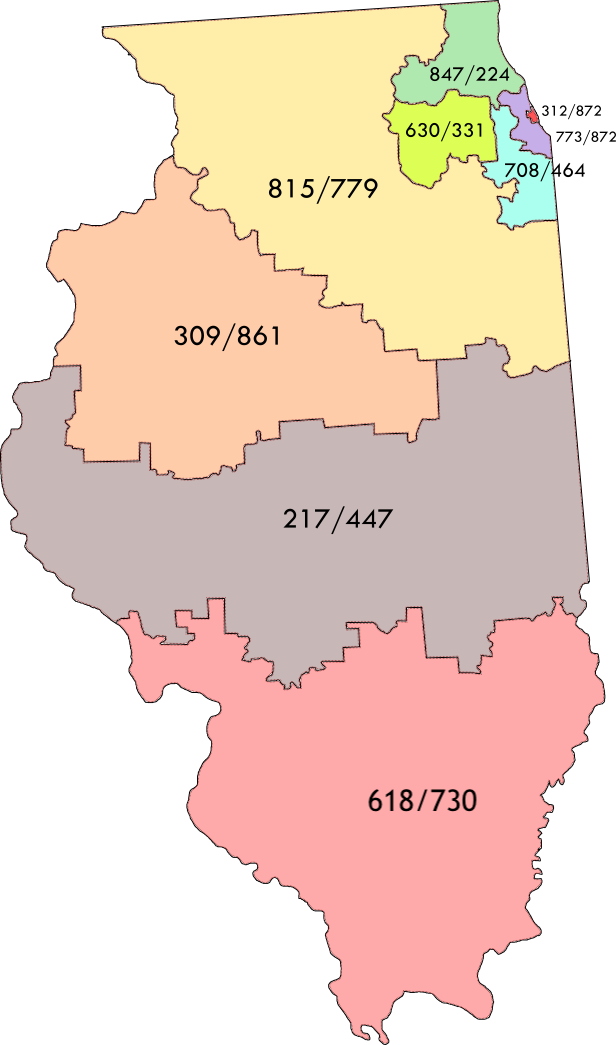
All NPAs within Illinois

Area codes 630 and 331 are telephone area codes in the North American Numbering Plan (NANP) for portions of Chicago's near and far western suburbs, including the majority of DuPage County, Illinois. To the northwest, the numbering plan area (NPA) also includes a small portion of Cook County, including parts of Schaumburg, Streamwood and Hanover Park. To the west, Kane County is divided between area codes 847 and 224 in the north, including Elgin, and area codes 630 and 331 in the south, including Aurora. To the south, the northern part of Will County and a small part of southern Cook County, including the village of Burr Ridge and parts of the village of Lemont, are also included in the 630 and 331 area codes. To the southwest, the city of Yorkville, in exurban Kendall County, is included, as well.

Area code 630 is the parent area code of the numbering plan area, created in a three-way area code split of area code 708 on August 3, 1996, with the southern suburbs keeping 708 and the northern suburbs receiving 847. Within a decade, 630 was close to exhaustion due to the growth of the Chicago suburbs and the proliferation of cell phones and pagers. On October 7, 2007, area code 331 began overlaying area code 630, making ten-digit dialing mandatory in the area.

The Illinois side of the Chicago area–312/773/872, 708, 847/224, 630/331 and portions of 815/779–is one of the largest local calling areas in the United States; with few exceptions, no long-distance charges are applied from one portion of the metro area to another.

== Service area ==
- Addison
- Aurora
- Bartlett
- Batavia
- Bensenville
- Big Rock
- Bloomingdale
- Bolingbrook (majority)
- Boulder Hill
- Bristol
- Burr Ridge
- Campton Hills
- Carol Stream
- Clarendon Hills
- Darien
- Downers Grove
- Elburn
- Elgin (partial)
- Elk Grove Village (partial)
- Elmhurst
- Geneva
- Glendale Heights
- Glen Ellyn
- Hanover Park
- Hinsdale
- Itasca
- Kaneville
- Keeneyville
- La Fox
- Lemont
- Lily Lake
- Lisle
- Little Rock
- Lombard
- Maple Park (eastern half)
- Medinah
- Millbrook
- Montgomery
- Mooseheart
- Naperville
- North Aurora
- Oak Brook
- Oakbrook Terrace
- Oswego
- Plainfield (partial)
- Plano
- Plattville
- Prestbury
- Romeoville (partial)
- Roselle
- Schaumburg (partial)
- South Elgin (partial)
- St. Charles
- Streamwood
- Sugar Grove
- Villa Park
- Virgil
- Warrenville
- Wayne
- Wasco
- West Chicago
- Westmont
- Wheaton
- Willowbrook
- Winfield
- Wood Dale
- Woodridge
- Yorkville

== See also ==
- List of North American Numbering Plan area codes
- List of Illinois area codes

Illinois area codes: 217/447, 309/861, 312, 630/331, 618/730, 708/464, 773, 815/779, 847/224, 872
	North: 847/224	
West: 815/779	area codes 630 and 331	East: 708/464
	South: 815/779	
