= Romani people in Chicago =

Ethnic group in the Chicago area

Romani people in Chicago are an ethnic group in the Chicago area. Around 5,000 to 10,000 Roma reside in the Chicago area. Romani people first came to Chicago in the 1880s.

In 2023, the Romani flag was raised for International Romani Day in Chicago.

== History ==
The Roma initially came to Chicago during the large waves of Eastern and Southern European immigration in the 1880s until World War I. Two Romani subgroups settled in Chicago, the Lovari and the Kalderash.

== Notable people ==
- Karen Finley

== See also ==
- Indians in Chicago
