= Indians in Chicago =

The Chicago metropolitan area has a large Indian American population. As of 2023, there were 255,523 Indian Americans (alone or in combination) living in the Chicago area, accounting for more than 2.5% of the total population, making them the largest Asian subgroup in the metropolitan region and the second-largest Indian American population among US metropolitan areas, after the Indians in the New York City metropolitan area. Of the Asian Indian alone or in combination population, 169,159 are foreign-born, making roughly 66% of Indians in the Chicago area immigrants.

As of 2020, Indians make up approximately 2.0% of the entire population of Illinois. Indians make up the overwhelming majority—nearly 81.6%—of the South Asian population of Illinois, followed by Pakistanis (15.1%), Nepalis (1.2%), Bangladeshis (1.0%), Sri Lankans (0.9%), and others (0.2%). Between 2010 and 2020, the Asian Indian population of Illinois grew from 203,669 to 276,519, an increase of 36%.

== History ==
The first documented arrival of Indians to Chicago occurred in the 1890s. One of the earliest and most famous Indian visitors to the city was the Hindu monk and philosopher Swami Vivekananda, who arrived in Chicago to appear as a delegate at the World Parliament of Religions, which was held in conjunction with the Chicago World's Fair of 1893. However, large numbers of Indians did not arrive in Chicago until the influx of graduated students and working professionals, following the passage of the Immigration and Nationality Act of 1965. Prior to the establishment of the first Indian community hubs, the diaspora in Chicago was primarily built around hospitals and universities, such as the Illinois Institute of Technology. The first immigrants amongst this wave were largely men that repatriated money to their relatives in India. They would later bring their families as part of the process of chain migration, greatly expanding the population base.

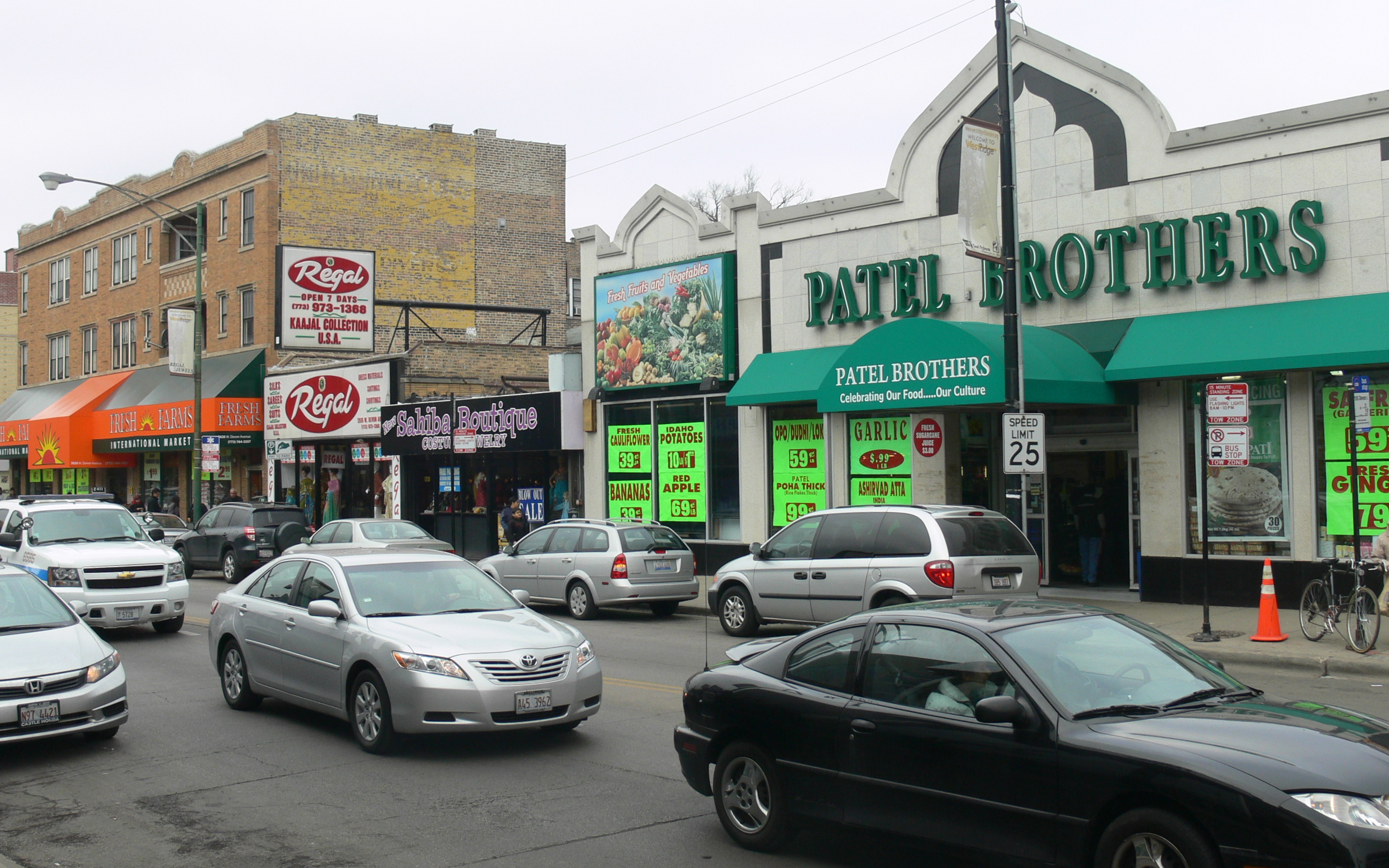
Street scene on Devon Avenue, the traditional port of entry for Indians arriving in the Chicago area. Patel Brothers, an Indian grocery chain that started on Devon, today has more than 50 locations across the United States.

Devon Avenue in the West Ridge neighborhood received many of the first Indian families. The Desi commercial hub started coming together in the early 1970s, as the predominantly Jewish population of West Ridge was decamping for near suburbs such as Skokie at the time; as late as the 1960s, the Jewish population of the area was estimated at 75%. In September 1974, the first dedicated Indian grocery store, Patel Brothers, opened on Devon Avenue as a small operation, later expanding into a much larger emporium down the street. By 1980, the Census recorded 33,541 Indians in the metropolitan area, which nearly quadrupled to 125,208 by the 2000 Census. Throughout the decades, various social organizations and community centers targeting the Indian diaspora opened in the area, including the Indo-American Center and Hamdard Health Center, which opened in 1992.

At the same time, the Indian population in the suburbs was growing and making substantial investments to build places of worship. In 1977, South Indian community leaders created a coalition to support the founding of The Hindu Temple of Greater Chicago, selecting Rama as the main deity for the temple. Following a rigorous site selection process, the temple was established in Lemont in 1986, with an initial congregation numbering several thousand people. In west suburban Aurora, the Sri Venkateswara Swami Balaji Temple was similarly erected in the mid-1980s with the considerable manual effort of India-trained artists and sculptors to create the elaborate edifice. Sikh gurdwaras, mosques, and other places of worship were also completed in this time period, though they did not garner the same attention as the high-profile and often more elaborate Hindu temple construction.

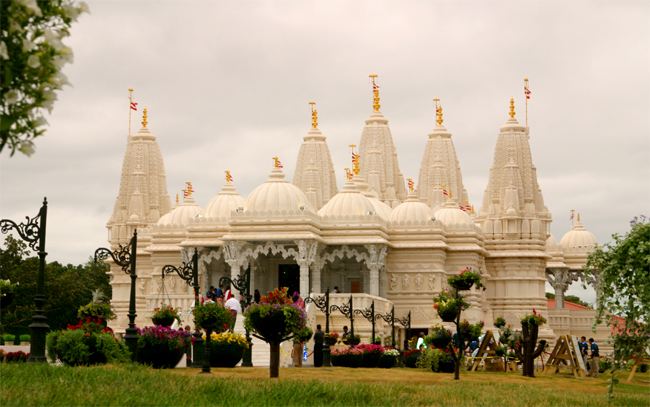
Constructed in 2004, the BAPS Mandir in suburban Bartlett is the largest Hindu place of worship of its kind in Illinois.

In 1991, the "Little India" section of Devon was designated Gandhi Marg. By 1995, a pamphlet issued by the Vishwa Hindu Parishad enumerated nearly 70 Indian associations in the Chicago metropolitan area catering primarily to Hindus. Houses of worship dedicated to Sikhs, Jains, Muslims, Christians, and Zoroastrians (Parsis) were also present in the area.

In 2004, the Chicago suburb of Bartlett saw the opening of the BAPS Shri Swaminarayan Mandir, the largest of its kind in Illinois, sprawling across 27 acres. Over 1,700 volunteers from around the Chicago area, and others hailing from three different continents assisted in the construction of the temple's facade, spending an excess of 2.5 million man hours to see the project to completion.

In 2008, the National Indo-American Museum (NIAM; formerly the Indo-American Heritage Museum) was established in Rogers Park, later moving to west suburban Lombard. The museum fulfills a role as the first and only institution of its kind in the country dedicated to sharing the full spectrum of the Indian American experience.

The city of Naperville in the western suburbs has hosted an annual India Day celebration since 2015, which has since grown into one of the largest Indian American festivals in the United States, attracting upwards of 10,000 attendees every year.

== Demographics ==
Within the metropolitan area, the towns of South Barrington, Schaumburg, Oak Brook, Buffalo Grove, Naperville, and Morton Grove have the six highest concentrations of South Asian Americans. Chicago, Naperville, Lincolnwood, Aurora, Skokie, and Hoffman Estates have the highest absolute numbers of South Asian Americans. At a county level, Cook County has the largest Indian population, followed by DuPage and then Lake. Indians comprise the largest share of the Asian American population in DuPage County at 48%.

Within the city of Chicago, single-race Indians represent about 22% of single-race Asian Americans. The vast majority of both South Asian Americans and Indian Americans specifically resided on the Far North side or in the Central region of the city encompassing downtown, with 7.2% of Central Chicago and 4.1% of the Far North Side claiming South Asian ancestry. On a numerical basis, the Far North Side, with more than 19,000 South Asian Americans, was the top area of residence for South Asian Americans. Indeed, Devon Avenue in the West Ridge neighborhood is noted for having a large number of Indian and Pakistani restaurants. and is home to the first location of Patel Brothers, the largest Indian grocery chain in the United States.

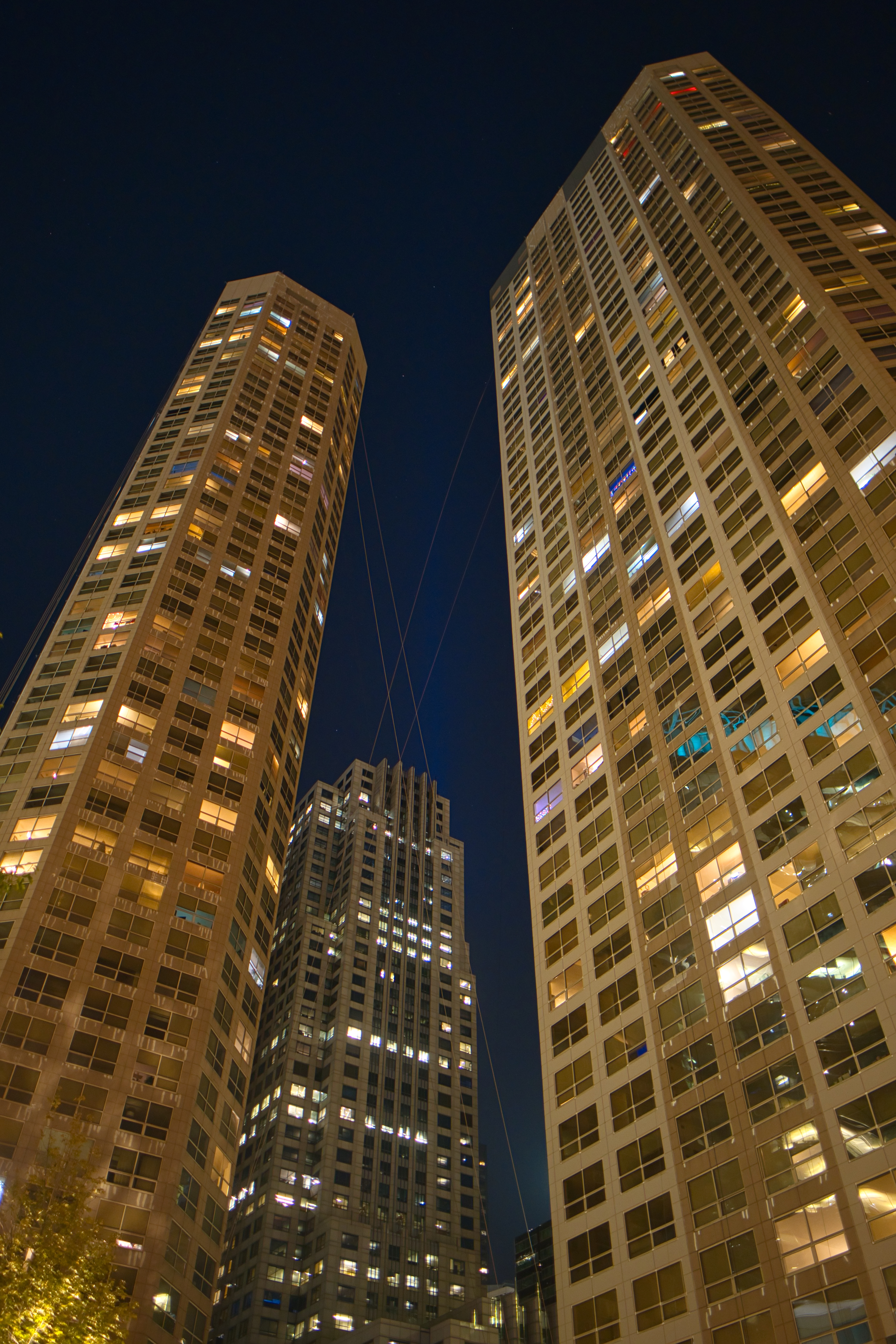
Presidential Towers in the West Loop is home to a large population of Indian university students and working professionals.

In recent decades, as the Devon Avenue Little India has diversified and Indian immigrants have experienced upward mobility, the nucleus of the community has shifted increasingly to areas including Naperville, Aurora, and Schaumburg in the western suburbs, with many Indians attracted to high-tech jobs such as those found in the Illinois Technology and Research Corridor, as well as high-quality public schools in the suburbs. A substantial South Asian enclave has also emerged along Roosevelt Road in Lombard, where changing tastes amongst young Desis has led to a growth of shops run by millennial and Gen Z owners.

1990 Census figures revealed that 72% of Asian-Indians lived in the suburbs, the highest proportion among Asian subgroups. By 2000, roughly 80% of Indian Chicagoans resided in the suburbs, with the trend intensifying further in 2010. At the same time, the mean population center of Indian settlement within Chicago was recorded at 7.4 km from Downtown – substantially higher than the Chinese mean center (2.8 km), but lower than the Filipino (10.4 km) and Vietnamese (11.7 km) distances. The city's Far North Side, where Devon is located, registered a decrease in its South Asian population by 7% from 2015 to 2020, and was the only division of Chicago with more than 1,000 South Asians in 2015 not to experience positive growth. Growth in the Downtown area, however, has been robust, with two West Loop zip codes, 60606 and 60661, superseding the South Asian percentages of 60645 and 60659, the two zip codes straddled by Devon Avenue, as of 2020. Today, with multiple Indian hubs scattered throughout the Chicago metropolitan area, some argue that the significance of Devon is diminishing. However, others contend that Devon will continue to anchor the Indian diaspora and retain its appeal for people seeking an immersive cultural experience.

Indians experience significantly higher levels of income and educational attainment, both compared to other Asian ethnicities and the US population as a whole. As of 2023, the median income of Indian American households in the Chicago area was $143,056, exceeding the median US household income by more than 75%. Additionally, more than 75% of Indians over the age of 25 reported having a bachelor's degree or higher. The majority of Indians are employed in either the professional, scientific, and technical services (25.5%) or education and health services (24.8%). The metropolitan area continues to see robust Indian immigration, with nearly 45% of the roughly 170,000 foreign-born Indians in the Chicago area having arrived since 2010.

According to Census estimates from 2009 to 2013, the most languages spoken at home in the core-based statistical area around Chicago (i.e. Chicago metropolitan area and surrounding micropolitan areas) were Urdu (41,234), Gujarati (39,590), and Hindi (33,820); followed by Punjabi (6,410), Bengali (5,200), and Marathi (3,925). At the city-level, the 2021 Census estimates numbered 13,448 Urdu, 7,239 Hindi, and 5,349 Gujarati speakers from the Indian subcontinent in Chicago.

== Religion ==
Although roughly 2.5% of Chicago metro area's population is Indian American, Pew Research Center's 2014 Religious Landscape Study indicated that only about 1% of adults in the Chicago metropolitan area are Hindu, implying that the remainder of the population is split amongst other groups. A 2000 study found that while the Indian community was broadly Hindu (77%), significant communities exist of Christians (7%), Muslims (4%), Sikhs (4%), and Jains (3%). Relative to India, the share of Chicago-area Indians that are Hindu is roughly similar, while Christians are overrepresented and Muslims are underrepresented. This also suggests the differing geographic origin of the Indians by state, with higher rates of Christianity observed in the South Indian states of Kerala and Tamil Nadu, where significant numbers of the immigrants originated.

Compared with the Indian population in the suburbs, the population on Devon is substantially Muslim, with a large contingent hailing from Hyderabad. Still, the neighborhood exhibits a high degree of religious diversity, with the Shree Ganesh Temple being Chicago's only house of worship dedicated to the Hindu elephant-headed god. Chicago today is also home to a local chapter of the Vivekananda Vedanta Society, founded in 1930, drawing a long thread back to the city's initial encounter with the Hindu disciple in 1893.

A report released by the Indian American Muslim Council (IAMC) in 2023 cites a growing trend of rightwing Hindu nationalism and political lobbying in Chicago's Indian community, revealing the tools that some Hindu nationalist organizations have exploited to influence local institutions to support their political vision.

== Notable Indian Americans from the Chicago area ==
- Jay Chandrasekhar, film director
- Raja Krishnamoorthi, U.S. representative from Illinois's 8th congressional district
- Ameya Pawar, former Chicago City Council alderman and first Asian American member of the Chicago City Council
- Danny Pudi, actor
- Prashanth Venkataramanujam, head writer and executive producer for Patriot Act with Hasan Minhaj
- Kevin Olickal, member of the Illinois House of Representatives from the 16th district
- Nabeela Syed, member of the Illinois House of Representatives from the 51st district
- Ram Villivalam, member of the Illinois Senate from the 8th district
- Chitra Ragavan, the first Asian-Indian on-air TV reporter in a major market

== See also ==
- Romani people in Chicago
