= Chicago metropolitan area =

Metropolitan area in the United States

- Conurbation
- Chicago–Naperville, IL–IN–WI; Combined Statistical Area
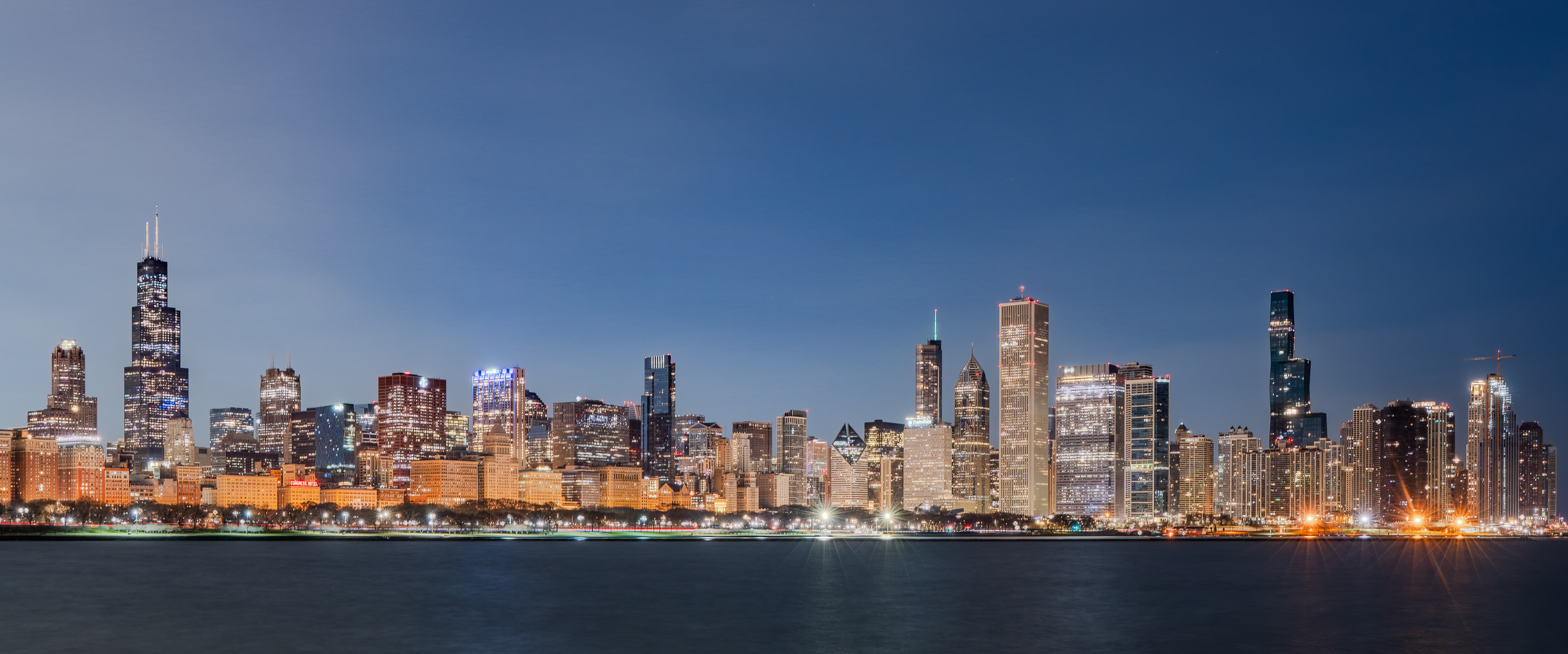
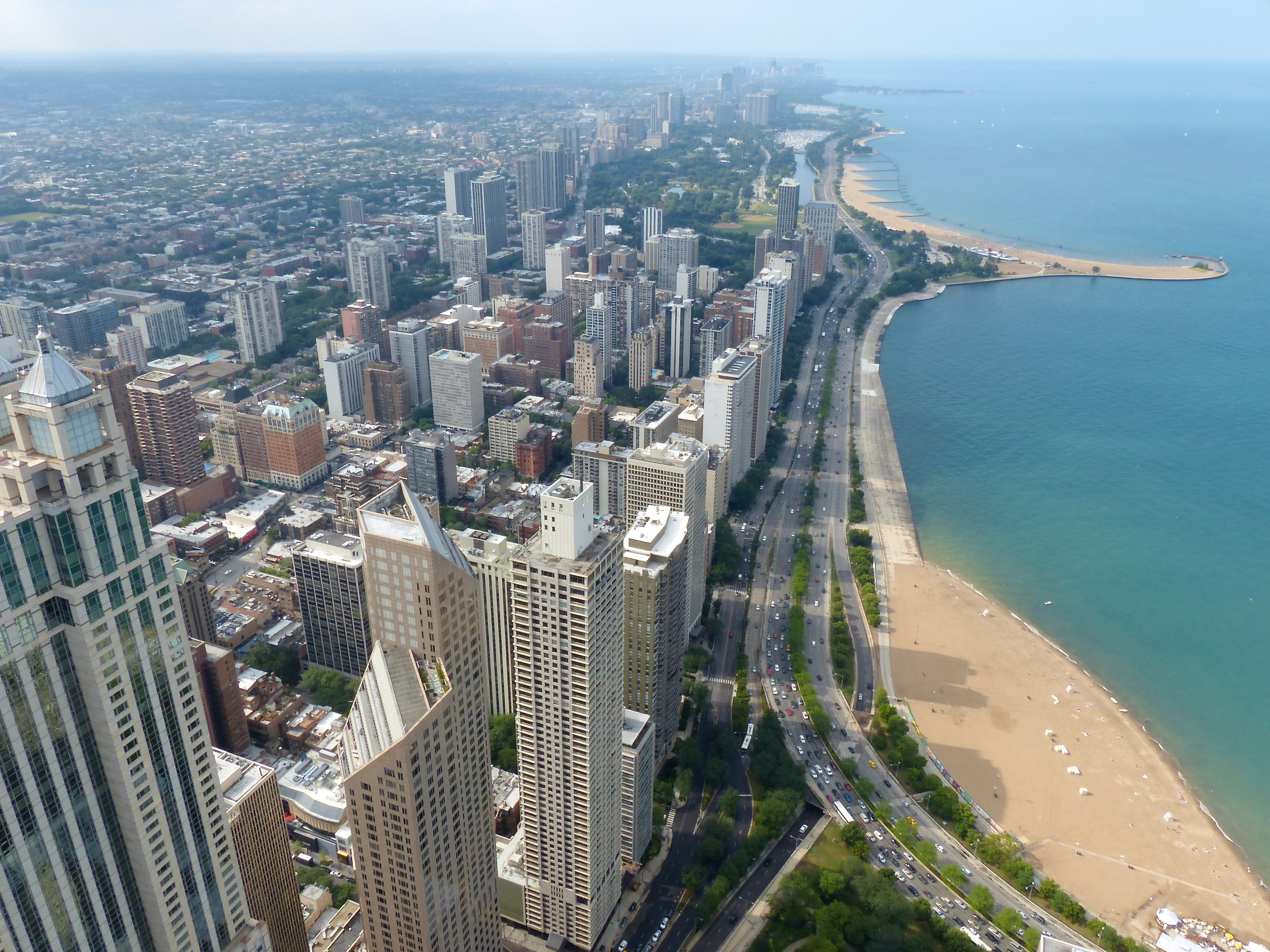
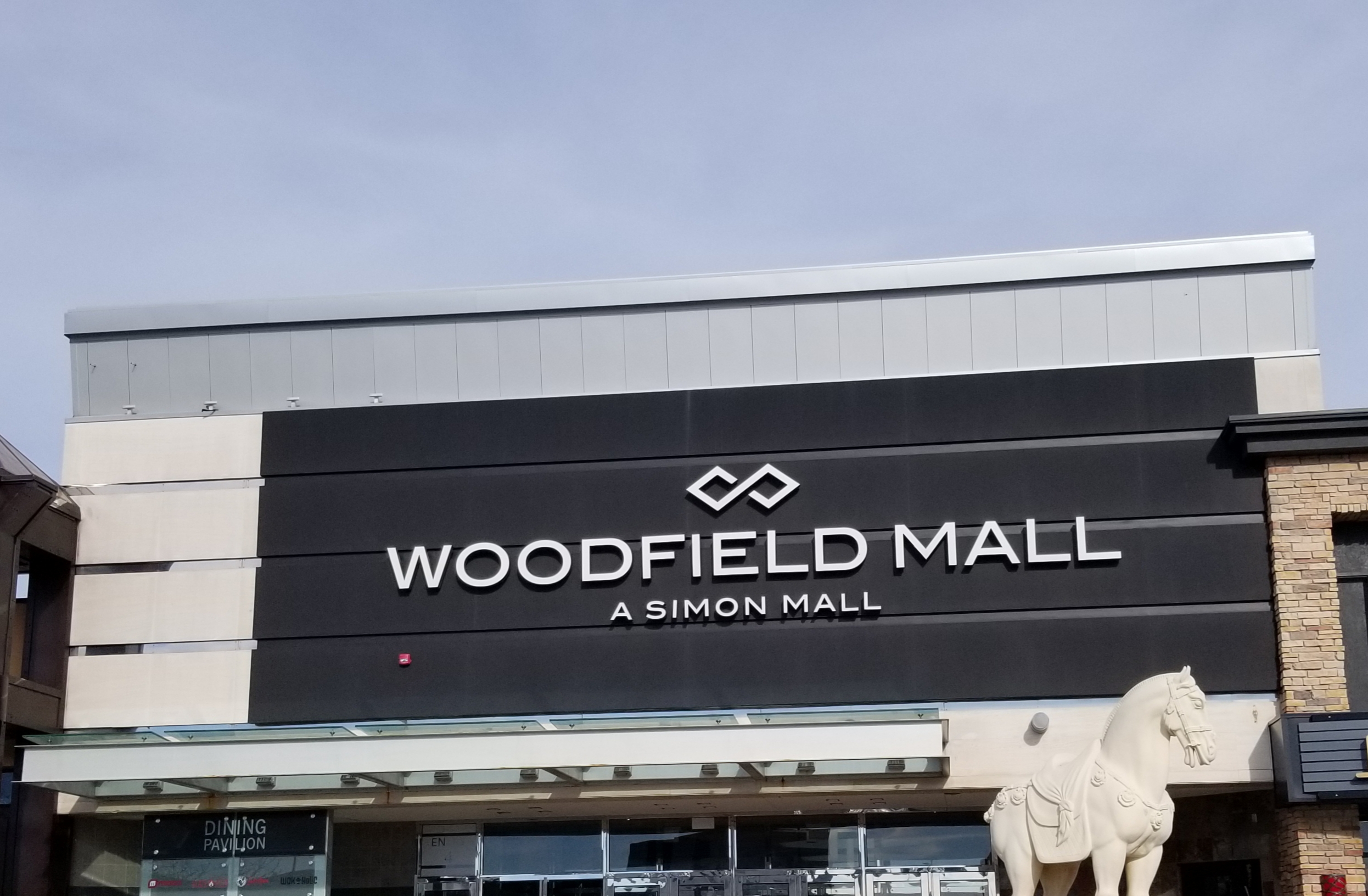
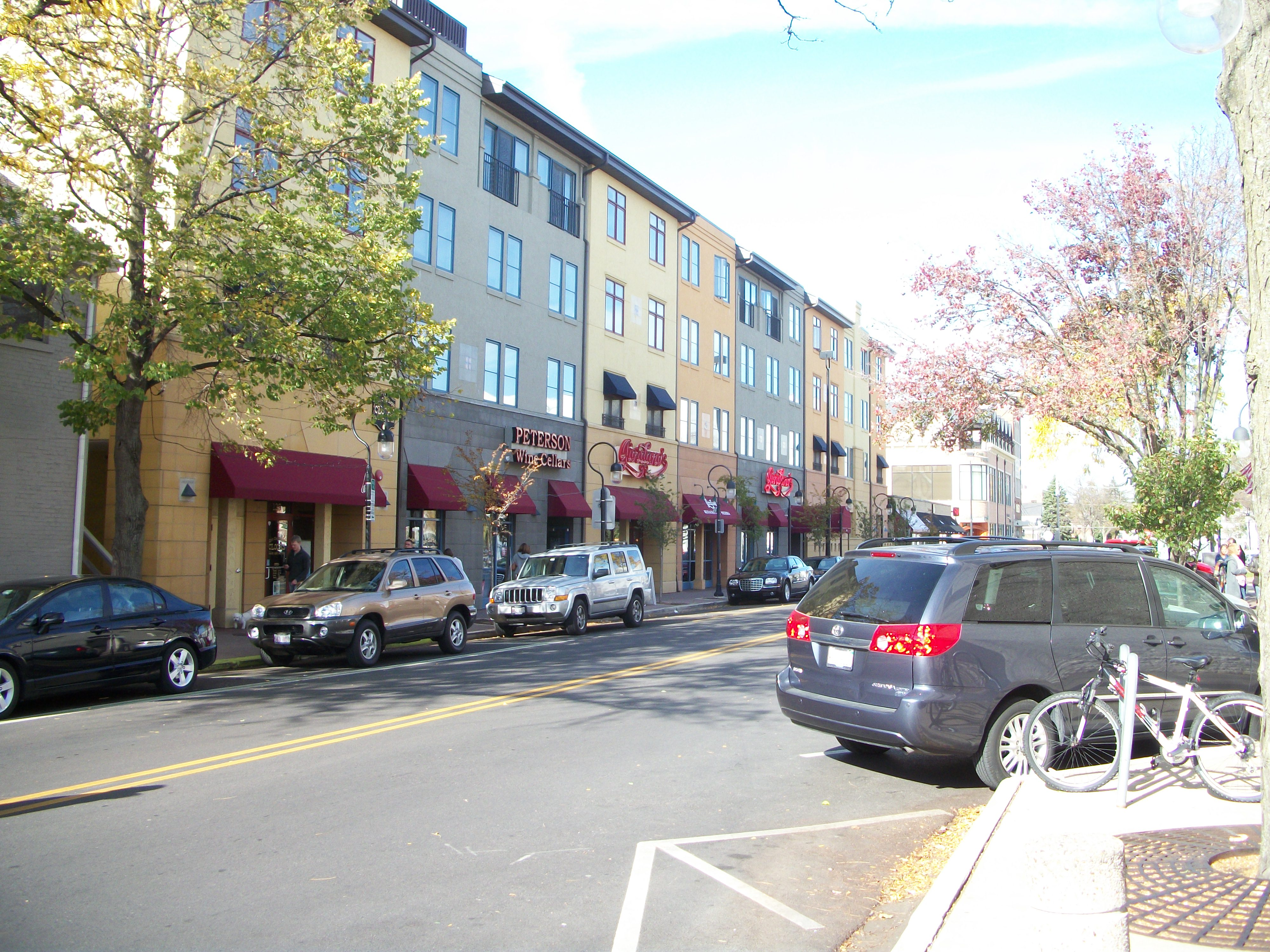
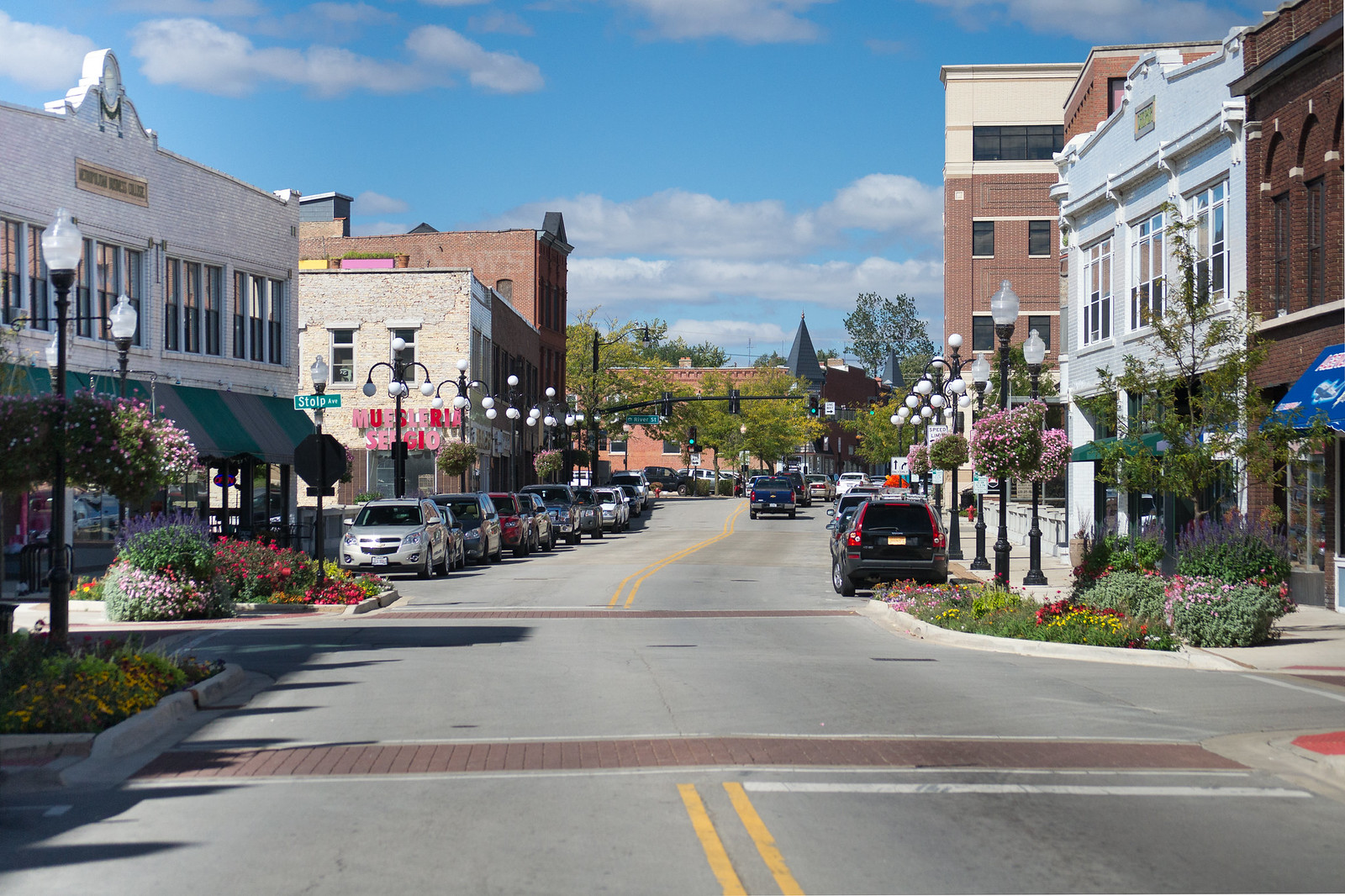
- Chicago skyline Gold Coast Woodfield Mall Downtown Naperville Downtown Aurora
Map of Chicago–Naperville, IL–IN–WI CSA
City of Chicago
Chicago–Naperville–Elgin, IL–IN MSA
Chicago–Naperville–Schaumburg, IL
Elgin, IL Metropolitan Division
Lake County, IL Metropolitan Division
Lake County–Porter Cty–Jasper Cty, IN
Other Statistical Areas in the Chicago CSA
Kenosha, WI MSA
Ottawa, IL µSA
Michigan City–La Porte, IN MSA
Kankakee, IL MSA
- Country: United States
- States: Illinois; Indiana; Wisconsin
- Core city: Chicago
- Satellite cities: Illinois: Aurora; Elgin; Crystal Lake; Joliet; Naperville; Evanston; Schaumburg; Waukegan; Kankakee; Indiana: Gary; Hammond; Michigan City; Wisconsin: Kenosha

Area
  - Metro: 10,856 sq mi (28,120 km^{2})
- Highest elevation: 673 ft (205 m)
- Lowest elevation: 579 ft (176 m)

Population
  - Density: 886/sq mi (342/km^{2})
  - Metropolitan Statistical Area (MSA) (2022): 9,441,957 (3rd)
  - Combined Statistical Area (CSA) (2022): 9,806,184 (4th)
- Demonym: Chicagolander

GDP
  - Metropolitan Statistical Area (MSA): $923.120 billion (2024)
  - Combined Statistical Area (CSA): $957.552 billion (2024)
- Time zone: UTC−6 (CST)
  - Summer (DST): UTC−5 (CDT)
- Area codes: 219, 224/847, 262, 312/872, 331/630, 574, 464/708, 773/872 and 779/815

The Chicago metropolitan area, also known as Chicagoland, is the largest metropolitan area in the U.S. state of Illinois and in the Midwest. The metropolitan area contains the City of Chicago along with its surrounding suburbs, satellite cities, and hinterland, spanning several counties across northeast Illinois and northwest Indiana. The MSA had a 2020 census population of 9,618,502, part of the fourth-largest combined statistical area in the United States, spanning 19 counties with a population of nearly 10 million. The Chicagoland is the third-largest metropolitan statistical area in the United States, the fourth-largest in North America (after Mexico City, New York City, and Los Angeles), and the largest in the Great Lakes megalopolis. Its urban area is the 50th-largest in the world.

According to the 2020 census, Chicagoland's population is approaching 10 million. In recent decades, the metropolitan area has seen a substantial increase of Latin American residents on top of its already large Latino population, and the Asian American population also increased. The metro area has a large number of White, Black, Latino, Asian, and Arab American residents, and also has Native American residents. The Chicago metropolitan area has about 3 percent of the U.S. population.

Chicagoland has one of the world's largest and most diversified economies. With more than six million full and part-time employees, the Chicagoland area is a key factor of the Illinois economy. The state has an annual GDP of over $1 trillion, and the Chicago metropolitan area generated an annual gross regional product (GRP) of approximately $700 billion in 2018. The region is home to more than 400 major corporate headquarters, including 31 in the Fortune 500, such as McDonald's, United, and Blue Cross Blue Shield. With many companies having project engagements in Chicago, the area ranked as the nation's top metropolitan area for corporation relocations and expansions for nine consecutive years, the most consecutive years for any region in the country. This metric however only measures project engagements, not real GDP or job growth, areas in which Chicago has substantially underperformed many other major metropolitan areas throughout the country over the past decade. Numerous high-profile companies have departed the city in recent years, including Fortune 500 firms such as Boeing, Caterpillar, TTX, Citadel Securities and Tyson, primarily due to unfavorable tax and regulatory conditions, as well as concerns at the time related to crime and overall quality of life. According to McDonald's CEO Chris Kempczinski these factors had significantly hindered the company's ability to recruit talent for corporate roles at its Chicago headquarters.

The Chicago area is home to a number of the nation's leading research universities, including the University of Chicago, Northwestern University, the University of Illinois at Chicago, DePaul University, Loyola University, and the Illinois Institute of Technology (IIT). The University of Chicago and Northwestern University are consistently ranked as two of the world's best universities.

The Chicago area is a major transportation hub in North America for various modes such as air, bus, road, rail, and marine. O'Hare International Airport (ORD) is ranked as one of the busiest airports in the world, being a major hub for American Airlines and United Airlines, while Midway International Airport (MDW) serves as a major operating base for Southwest Airlines. Eight mainline interstate highways and four auxiliary interstates serve the region. Some interstates are toll roads such as those that belong to the Illinois Tollway and the Indiana Toll Road. The Northern Illinois Transit Authority (NITA) coordinates the operation of three transit service boards serving much of the Illinois portion of the Chicagoland area: the Chicago Transit Authority (CTA), Metra commuter rail, and Pace Suburban Bus. One Metra line extends into Kenosha, Wisconsin. The Northern Indiana Commuter Transportation District (NICTD) operates the South Shore Line interurban service between downtown Chicago and the Northwest Indiana portion of the metropolitan area. Chicago Union Station (which also hosts Metra trains) is a major hub for Amtrak passenger trains and the main base for the Amtrak Midwest corridor services. All six Class I freight railroads meet in the Chicago area. The Port of Chicago allows for the passage of maritime shipping between the Great Lakes and Mississippi River basin.

== Definitions ==
=== Chicago Metropolitan statistical area ===
The Chicago–Naperville, IL–IN–WI Combined Statistical Area as defined by the U.S. Census Bureau: Chicago–Naperville–Elgin, IL–IN–WI MSA Michigan City–La Porte, IN MSA Kankakee, IL MSA Ottawa, IL MSA

The Chicago metropolitan statistical area (MSA) was originally designated by the United States Census Bureau in 1950. It comprised the Illinois counties of Cook, DuPage, Kane, Lake and Will, along with Lake County in Indiana. As surrounding counties saw an increase in their population densities and the number of their residents employed within Cook County, they met Census criteria to be added to the MSA. The Chicago MSA, now defined by the U.S. Census Bureau as the Chicago–Naperville–Elgin, IL–IN–WI Metropolitan Statistical Area, is the third-largest MSA by population in the United States. The 2022 census estimate for the population of the MSA was 9,441,957.

The Chicago MSA is further subdivided into four metropolitan divisions. A breakdown of the county constituents and 2021 estimated populations of the four metropolitan divisions of the MSA are as follows:

Chicago–Naperville–Elgin, IL–IN–WI Metropolitan Statistical Area (9,509,934)

- Chicago–Naperville–Schaumburg, IL Metropolitan Division (7,159,394)
  - Cook County, Illinois (5,173,146)
  - DuPage County, Illinois (924,885)
  - Grundy County, Illinois (52,989)
  - McHenry County, Illinois (311,122)
  - Will County, Illinois (697,252)
- Elgin, IL Metropolitan Division (750,869)
  - DeKalb County, Illinois (100,414)
  - Kane County, Illinois (515,588)
  - Kendall County, Illinois (134,867)
- Lake County, IL Metropolitan Division (711,239)
  - Lake County, Illinois (711,239)
- Lake County–Porter County–Jasper County, IN Metropolitan Division (719,700)
  - Jasper County, Indiana (33,091)
  - Lake County, Indiana (498,558)
  - Newton County, Indiana (13,808)
  - Porter County, Indiana (174,243)

=== Combined statistical area ===
The Census Bureau also defines a slightly larger region as a combined statistical area (CSA). The Chicago–Naperville, IL–IN–WI Combined Statistical Area combines the following core-based statistical areas, listed with their 2021 estimated populations. The combined statistical area as a whole had a population of 9,806,184 as of 2022.

- Chicago–Naperville–Elgin, IL–IN–WI metropolitan statistical area (9,509,934)
- Kankakee, IL metropolitan statistical area (106,601)
  - Kankakee County, Illinois (106,601)
- Michigan City–La Porte, IN metropolitan statistical area (112,390)
  - LaPorte County, Indiana (112,390)
- Kenosha, WI metropolitan statistical area
  - Kenosha County, Wisconsin
- Ottawa, IL micropolitan statistical area (147,414)
  - Bureau County, Illinois (32,883)
  - LaSalle County, Illinois (108,965)
  - Putnam County, Illinois (5,566)

=== United Nations' Chicago urban agglomeration ===
The Chicago urban agglomeration, according to the United Nations World Urbanization Prospects report (2023 revision), lists a population of 8,937,000. The term "urban agglomeration" refers to the population contained within the contours of a contiguous territory inhabited at urban density levels. It usually incorporates the population in a city, plus that in the contiguous urban, or built-up area.

=== Chicagoland ===
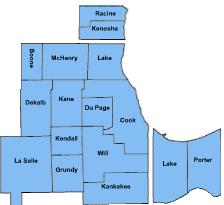
Chicagoland by county and state as defined by the Construction Data Company

A map of Chicagoland in relation to the states of Wisconsin, Illinois, and Indiana

Chicagoland is an informal name for the Chicago metropolitan area. The term Chicagoland has no official definition, and the region is often considered to include areas beyond the corresponding MSA, as well as portions of the greater CSA.

Colonel Robert R. McCormick, editor and publisher of the Chicago Tribune, usually gets credit for placing the term in common use. McCormick's conception of Chicagoland stretched all the way to nearby parts of four states (Indiana, Wisconsin, Michigan, and Iowa). The first usage was in the Tribune's July 27, 1926, front page headline, "Chicagoland's Shrines: A Tour of Discoveries", for an article by reporter James O'Donnell Bennett. He stated that Chicagoland comprised everything in a 200-mile (320 km) radius in every direction and reported on many different places in the area. The Tribune was the dominant newspaper in a vast area stretching to the west of the city, and that hinterland was closely tied to the metropolis by rail lines and commercial links.

Today, the Chicago Tribune's usage includes the city of Chicago, the rest of Cook County, eight nearby Illinois counties (Lake, McHenry, DuPage, Kane, Kendall, Grundy, Will, and Kankakee), and the two Indiana counties of Lake and Porter. Illinois Department of Tourism literature uses Chicagoland for suburbs in Cook, Lake, DuPage, Kane, and Will counties, treating the city separately. The Chicagoland Chamber of Commerce defines it as all of Cook, DuPage, Kane, Lake, McHenry, and Will counties.

In addition, company marketing programs such as Construction Data Company's "Chicago and Vicinity" region and the Chicago Automobile Trade Association's "Chicagoland and Northwest Indiana" advertising campaign are directed at the MSA itself, as well as LaSalle, Winnebago (Rockford), Boone, and Ogle counties in Illinois, in addition to Jasper, Newton, and La Porte counties in Indiana and Kenosha, Racine, and Walworth counties in Wisconsin, and even as far northeast as Berrien County, Michigan. The region is part of the Great Lakes Megalopolis, containing an estimated 55 million people.

=== Collar counties ===
The term "collar counties" is a colloquialism for the five counties (DuPage, Kane, Lake, McHenry, and Will) of Illinois that border Chicago's Cook County. After Cook County, they are also the next five most populous counties in the state. According to the Encyclopedia of Chicago, there is no specifically known origin of the phrase, but it has been commonly used among policy makers, urban planners, and in the media. However, it also notes that as growth has spread beyond these counties, it may have lost some of its usefulness.

=== Chicago Metropolitan Agency for Planning ===
The Chicago Metropolitan Agency for Planning (CMAP) is an Illinois state agency that serves as the federally-mandated metropolitan planning organization (MPO) for the Illinois portion of the region. It is responsible for transportation planning, land use planning, infrastructure, and long-term economic development planning for the areas under its jurisdiction within Illinois. The metropolitan planning area (MPA) has a population of over 8 million, which includes the following locations in Illinois:

- Cook County
- DuPage County
- Kane County
- Kendall County
- Lake County
- McHenry County
- Will County

The Northwestern Indiana Regional Planning Commission (NIRPC) and the Milwaukee-based Southeastern Wisconsin Regional Planning Commission (SEWRPC) serve as the MPOs for the Indiana and Wisconsin portions of the region, respectively. DeKalb County and Kankakee County, although in Illinois, have their own respective MPOs and are not part of CMAP.

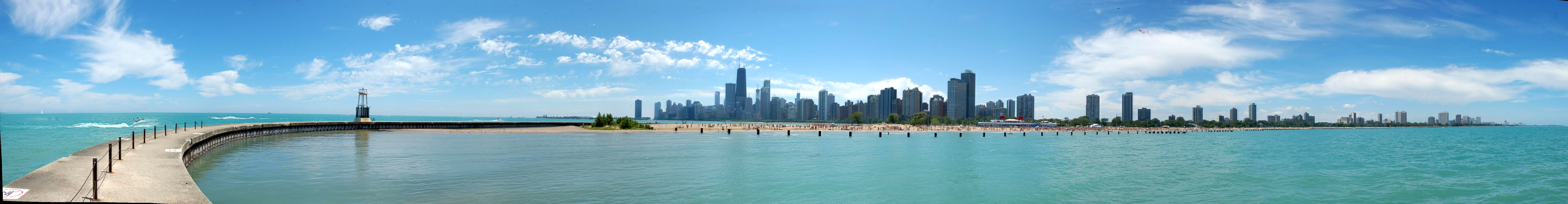
Panorama of North Avenue Beach

== Geography and environment ==
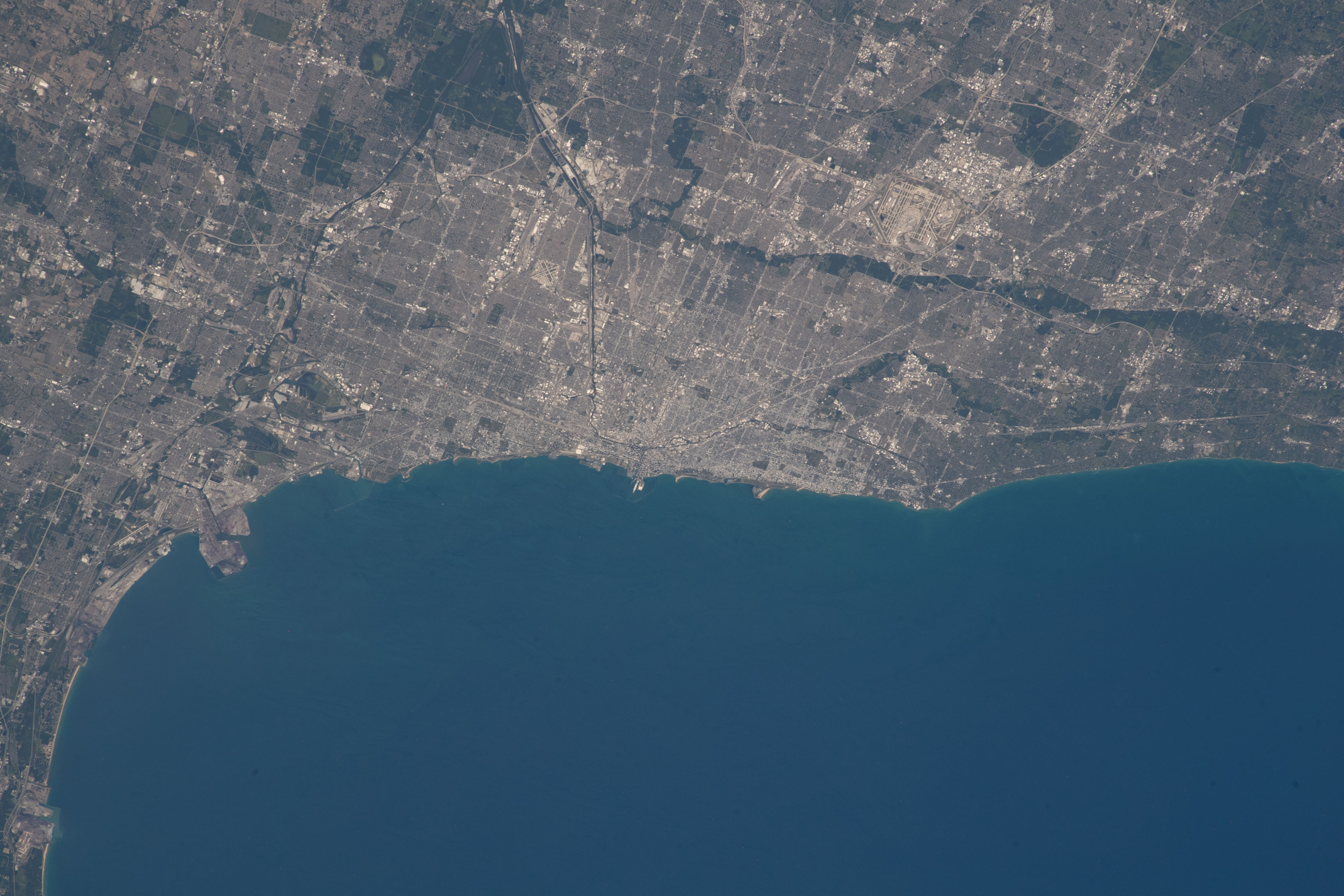
Taken from the ISS on June 23, 2022; downtown Chicago is at the center by the lake.

The city of Chicago lies in the Chicago Plain, a flat and broad area characterized by little topographical relief. The few low hills are sand ridges. North of the Chicago Plain, steep bluffs and ravines run alongside Lake Michigan.

Along the southern shore of the Chicago Plain, sand dunes run alongside the lake. The tallest dunes reach up to near 200 feet (61 m) and are found in Indiana Dunes National Park. Surrounding the low plain are bands of moraines in the south and west suburbs. These areas are higher and hillier than the Chicago Plain. A continental divide, separating the Mississippi River watershed from that of the Great Lakes and Saint Lawrence River, runs through the Chicago area.

A 2012 survey of the urban trees and forests in the seven county Illinois section of the Chicago area found that 21% of the land is covered by the tree and shrub canopy, made up of about 157,142,000 trees. The five most common tree species are buckthorn, green ash, boxelder, black cherry, and American elm. These resources perform important functions in carbon storage, water recycling, and energy saving.

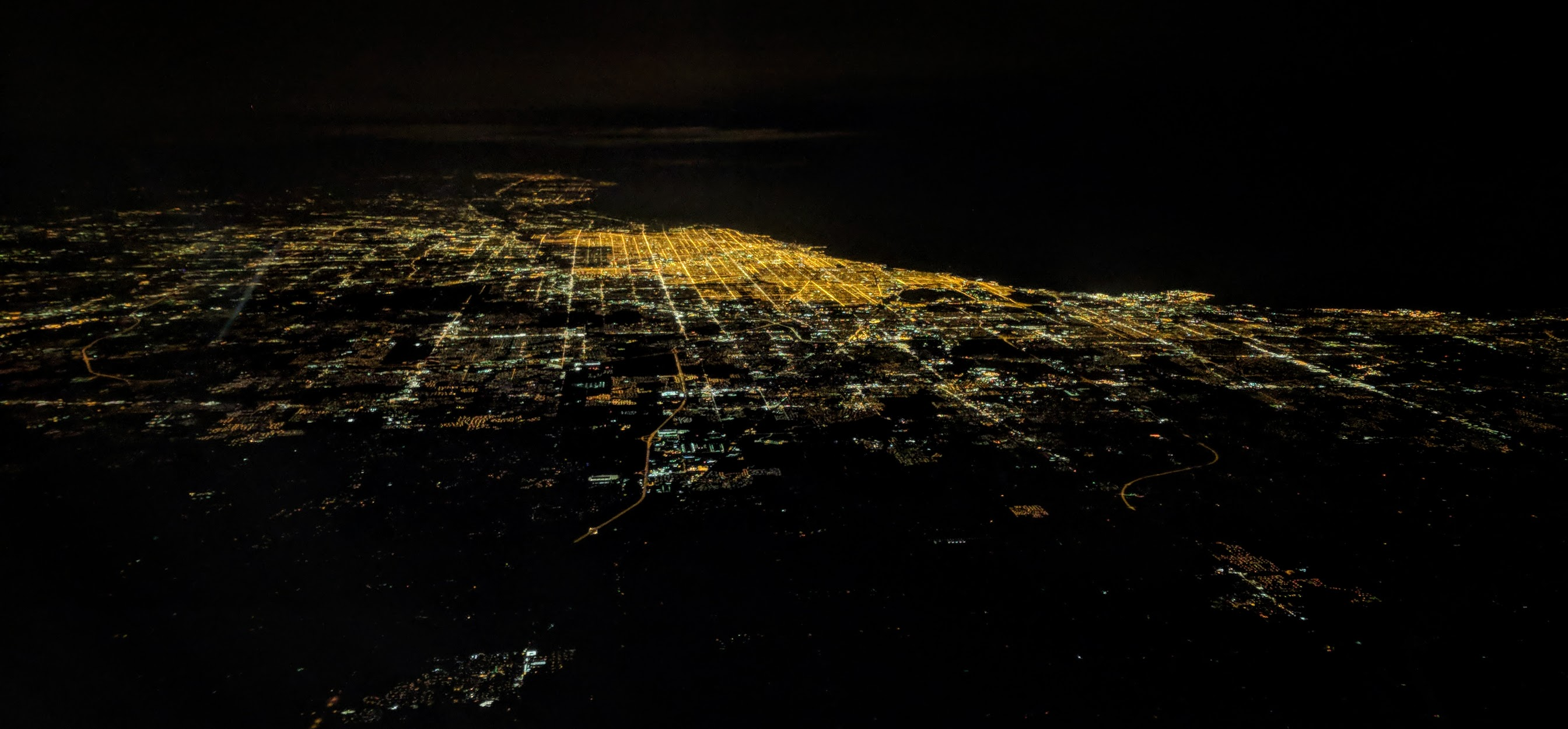
Night aerial view of Chicago and vicinity

== Demographics ==
=== Racial and ethnic composition ===
Chicagoland – Racial and ethnic composition Note: the US Census treats Hispanic/Latino as an ethnic category. This table excludes Latinos from the racial categories and assigns them to a separate category. Hispanics/Latinos may be of any race.
Race / Ethnicity (NH = Non-Hispanic)	Pop 2020	% 2020
White alone (NH)	4,825,000	50.16%
Black or African American alone (NH)	1,545,811	16.07%
Native American or Alaska Native alone (NH)	10,670	0.11%
Asian alone (NH)	678,669	7.06%
Native Hawaiian or Pacific Islander alone (NH)	2,014	0.02%
Other race alone (NH)	35,395	0.37%
Mixed race or Multiracial (NH)	281,567	2.93%
Hispanic or Latino (any race)	2,239,376	23.28%
Total	9,618,502	100.00%

Population density in the Chicago urban area

=== Race and ethnicity ===
As of 2022, the metropolitan area had a population of 9,442,159. The population density was 1,312.3 per square mile. The racial makeup was 50.1% Non-Hispanic White, 23.4% were Hispanic, 15.5% were Non-Hispanic African Americans, 7.2% were Asian, 0.1% were Non-Hispanic Native American, 0.4% identified as “some other race,” and 3.2% were non-Hispanic multiracial.

=== Ancestry ===
According to 2023 estimates from the American Community Survey, the largest ancestries in the Chicago metro area were Mexican (18.3%), African (17.7%), German (12.6%), Irish (9.9%), Polish (7.8%), Italian (6.2%), English (4.8%), Indian (2.7%), Puerto Rican (2.2%), Filipino (1.7%), Swedish (1.5%), and Chinese (1.5%).

Ancestry	Number in 2023 (Alone)	Number as of 2023 (Alone or in any combination)	% Total
Mexican	—	1,702,582	18.4%
Black or African American (Including Afro-Caribbean & Sub-Saharan African)	1,454,774	1,640,932	17.7%
German	258,719	1,171,467	12.6%
Irish	228,668	920,413	9.9%
Polish	308,727	721,538	7.8%
Italian	171,860	573,170	6.2%
English	111,705	448,481	4.8%
Indian	233,793	248,606	2.7%
American (Mostly old-stock white Americans of British descent)	160,656	224,204	2.4%
Puerto Rican	—	206,682	2.2%
Filipino	121,749	157,730	1.7%
Swedish	26,644	143,476	1.5%
Chinese	113,354	137,286	1.5%
French	10,665	106,879	1.2%
Dutch	28,209	96,060	1.0%
Arab	66,215	94,913	1.0%
Scottish	16,268	89,240	1.0%
Greek	37,976	85,501	0.9%
Norwegian	21,289	85,404	0.9%
Russian	28,348	78,252	0.8%
Czech	19,212	72,058	0.8%
Ukrainian	47,806	69,266	0.7%
Indigenous Latin American	38,200	64,863	0.7%
Korean	49,779	62,325	0.7%
Lithuanian	24,763	59,359	0.6%
Pakistani	41,457	47,078	0.5%
Nigerian	31,833	41,263	0.4%
Guatemalan	—	40,847	0.4%
Ecuadorian	—	38,590	0.4%
Hungarian	10,626	37,658	0.4%
Colombian	—	37,451	0.4%
Croatian	11,316	36,601	0.4%
Scotch-Irish	8,216	32,606	0.4%
Romanian	20,218	31,904	0.3%
Japanese	14,823	31,055	0.3%
Vietnamese	24,447	31,007	0.3%

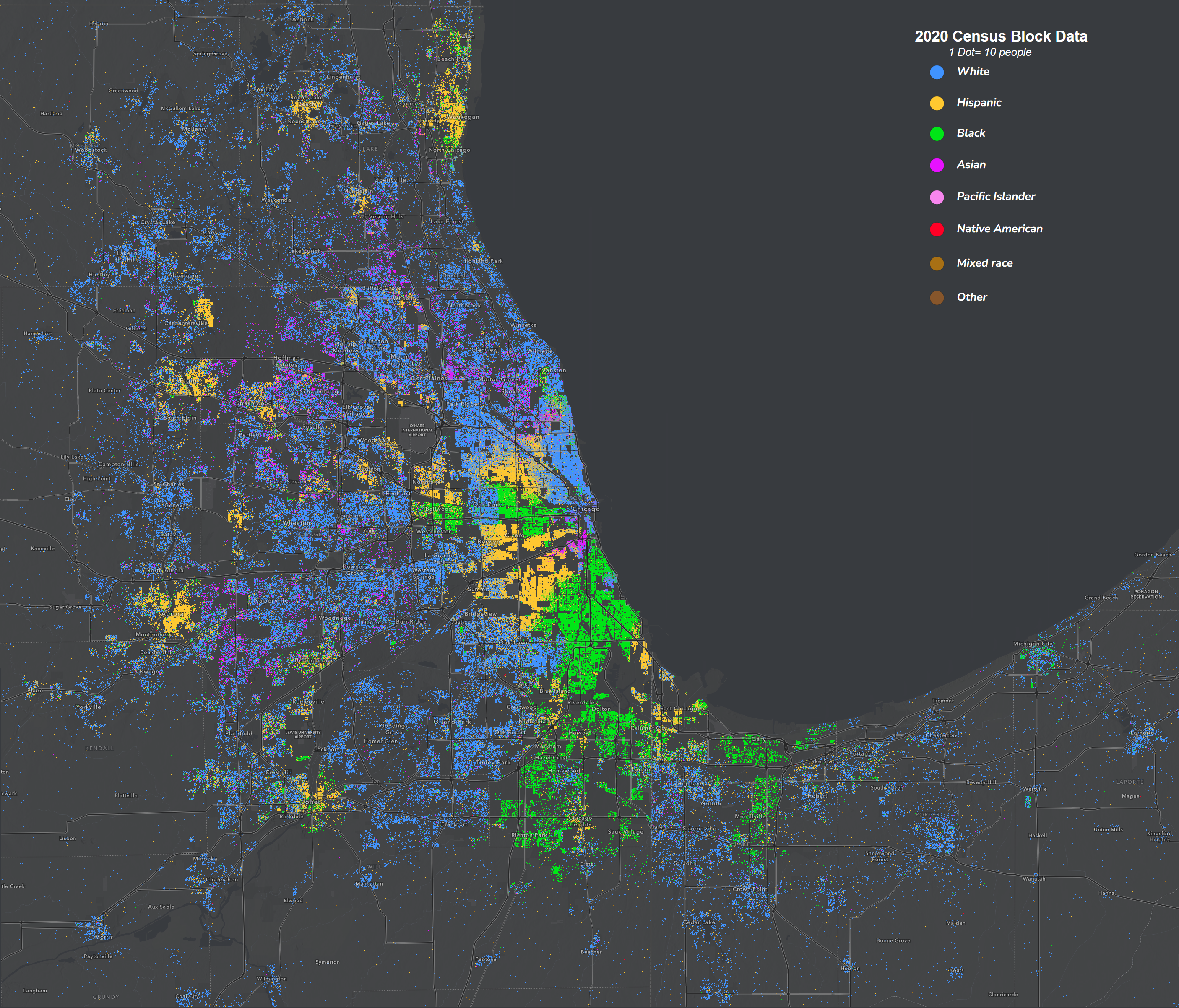
A dot distribution map showing the ethnic and racial demographics of the Chicago area according to the 2020 Census

=== Urban growth ===
The suburbs, surrounded by easily annexed flat ground, have been expanding at a tremendous rate since the early 1960s. Aurora, Elgin, Joliet, and Naperville are noteworthy for being four of the few boomburbs outside the Sun Belt, West Coast and Mountain States regions, and exurban Kendall County ranked as the fastest-growing county (among counties with a population greater than 10,000) in the United States between 2000 and 2007.

=== Income ===
Settlement patterns in the Chicago metropolitan area tend to follow those in the city proper: the northern and northwestern suburbs are generally affluent and upper-middle class, while the southern suburbs (sometimes known as Chicago Southland) have somewhat lower median incomes and a cost of living, with the exception being the southwest suburbs which contain many upper-middle class areas. Another exception to this is the West Side, which has a somewhat lower median income, but the western suburbs contain many affluent and upper-middle class areas. According to the 2000 Census, DuPage County as a whole had the highest median household income of any county in the Midwestern United States, although there are individual cities and towns in other surrounding counties in the metro that have even higher median incomes.

According to 2022 estimates from the U.S. Census, poverty rates of the largest counties from least poverty to most are as follows: McHenry 4.0%, Dupage 6.7%, Will 6.9%, Kane 7.8%, Lake 8.0%, and Cook 13.6%. However, Cook County, which contains luxury high rises and expensive houses in sections of the city and expensive houses along the waterfront in the North Shore area, would also have the highest percentage of expensive homes in the region.

In an in-depth historical analysis, Keating (2004, 2005) examined the origins of 233 settlements that by 1900 had become suburbs or city neighborhoods of the Chicago metropolitan area. The settlements began as farm centers (41%), industrial towns (30%), residential railroad suburbs (15%), and recreational/institutional centers (13%). Although relations between the different settlement types were at times contentious, there also was cooperation in such undertakings as the construction of high schools.

== Population ==
As the Chicago metropolitan area has grown, more counties have been partly or totally assimilated with the taking of each decennial census.

Census Area	Area Type	2020 census	2010 census	2000 census	1990 census	1980 Census	1970 census	1960 census	1950 census
Chicago-Naperville-Joliet, IL-IN-WI	Metropolitan	9,618,502	9,461,105	9,098,316	8,065,633	7,869,542	7,612,314	6,794,461	5,495,364
Cook County, Illinois	Metropolitan	5,275,541	5,194,675	5,376,741	5,105,067	5,253,655	5,492,369	5,129,725	4,508,792
DeKalb County, Illinois	Metropolitan	100,420	105,160	88,969	77,932	74,624	71,654	51,714	40,781
DuPage County, Illinois	Metropolitan	932,877	916,924	904,161	781,666	658,835	491,882	313,459	154,599
Grundy County, Illinois	Metropolitan	52,533	50,063	37,535	32,337	30,582	26,535	22,350	19,217
Kane County, Illinois	Metropolitan	516,522	515,269	404,119	317,471	278,405	251,005	208,246	150,388
Kendall County, Illinois	Metropolitan	131,869	114,736	54,544	39,413	37,202	26,374	17,540	12,115
McHenry County, Illinois	Metropolitan	310,229	308,760	260,077	183,241	147,897	111,555	84,210	50,656
Will County, Illinois	Metropolitan	696,355	677,560	502,266	357,313	324,460	249,498	191,617	134,336
Jasper County, Indiana	Metropolitan	32,918	33,478	30,043	24,960	26,138	20,429	18,842	17,031
Lake County, Indiana	Metropolitan	498,700	496,005	484,564	475,594	522,965	546,253	513,269	368,152
Newton County, Indiana	Metropolitan	13,830	14,244	14,566	13,551	14,844	11,606	11,502	11,006
Porter County, Indiana	Metropolitan	173,215	164,343	146,798	128,932	119,816	87,114	60,279	40,076
Lake County, Illinois	Metropolitan	714,342	703,462	644,356	516,418	440,372	382,638	293,656	179,097
Kenosha County, Wisconsin	Metropolitan	169,151	166,426	149,577	128,181	123,137	117,917	100,615	75,238
Kankakee County, Illinois	Combined	107,502	113,449	103,833	96,255	102,926	97,250	92,063	73,524
LaSalle County, Illinois	Combined	109,658	113,924	111,509	106,913	112,003	111,409	110,800	100,610
Bureau County, Illinois	Combined	33,244	34,978	35,503	35,688	39,114	38,541	37,594	37,711
Putnam County, Illinois	Combined	5,637	6,006	6,086	5,730	6,085	5,007	4,570	4,746
LaPorte County, Indiana	Combined	112,417	111,467	110,106	107,066	108,632	105,342	95,111	76,808
Chicago-Naperville-Joliet, IL-IN-WI	Combined	9,986,960	9,686,021	9,312,255	8,385,397	8,264,490	8,089,421	7,204,198	5,911,816

Counties highlighted in gray were not included in the MSA for that census. The CSA totals in blue are the totals of all the counties listed above, regardless of whether they were included in the Chicago Combined Statistical Area at the time.

=== Principal municipalities ===
==== Over 1,000,000 population ====
- Chicago (2,746,388)

==== Over 100,000 population ====
- Aurora, Illinois (180,542)
- Joliet, Illinois (150,362)
- Naperville, Illinois (149,540)
- Elgin, Illinois (114,797)

==== Over 50,000 population ====
- Kenosha, Wisconsin (99,986)
- Waukegan, Illinois (89,321)
- Cicero, Illinois (85,268)
- Schaumburg, Illinois (78,723)
- Evanston, Illinois (78,110)
- Hammond, Indiana (77,879)
- Arlington Heights, Illinois (77,676)
- Bolingbrook, Illinois (73,922)
- Gary, Indiana (69,093)
- Palatine, Illinois (67,908)
- Skokie, Illinois (67,824)
- Des Plaines, Illinois (60,675)
- Orland Park, Illinois (58,703)
- Oak Lawn, Illinois (58,362)
- Berwyn, Illinois (57,250)
- Mount Prospect, Illinois (56,852)
- Tinley Park, Illinois (55,971)
- Oak Park, Illinois (54,583)
- Wheaton, Illinois (53,970)
- Downers Grove, Illinois (50,247)
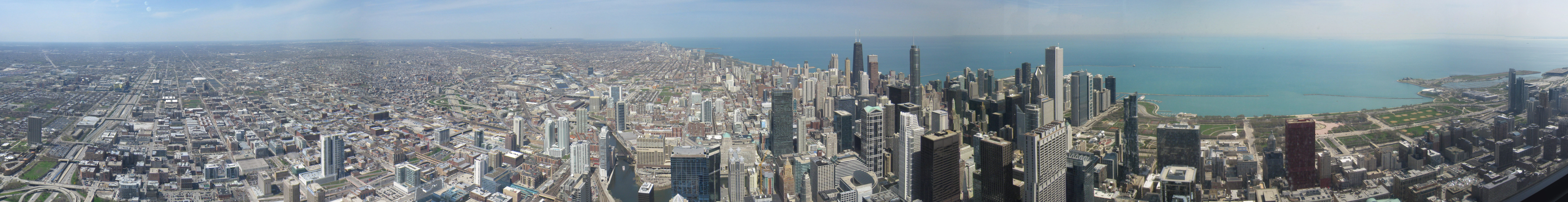
View of Chicago greater metropolitan region and the North branch of the Chicago River from the Willis Tower

=== Urban areas within ===
Within the boundary of the 16-county Chicago Combined Statistical Area lies the Chicago urban area, as well as 26 smaller urban areas. Some of the urban areas below may partially cross into other statistical areas. Only those situated primarily within the Chicago combined statistical area are listed here.

Urban areas contained within the Chicago combined statistical area as of the 2020 census: Urban areas Counties in the Chicago MSA Counties in the Chicago CSA but not the MSA

Urban area	Population (2020 census)	Land area (sq mi)	Land area (km^{2})	Density (population / sq mi)	Density (population / km^{2})
Chicago, IL–IN	8,671,746	2,337.89	6,055.09	3,709.2	1,432.1
Round Lake Beach–McHenry–Grayslake, IL–WI	261,835	127.61	330.52	2,051.8	792.2
Kenosha, WI	125,865	56.17	145.48	2,240.8	865.2
Michigan City–La Porte, IN–MI	71,367	49.16	127.32	1,451.7	560.5
Kankakee, IL	66,530	31.66	82.00	2,101.4	811.3
DeKalb, IL	64,736	25.63	66.39	2,525.6	975.1
Valparaiso–Shorewood Forest, IN	51,867	33.64	87.12	1,542.0	595.4
Peru–LaSalle, IL	29,763	21.45	55.56	1,387.4	535.7
Woodstock, IL	25,298	9.31	24.10	2,718.7	1,049.7
Ottawa, IL	20,122	9.99	25.87	2,014.2	777.7
Streator, IL	16,209	8.12	21.04	1,995.3	770.4
Coal City–Braidwood, IL	15,837	10.29	26.65	1,539.4	594.4
Morris, IL	15,740	8.64	22.37	1,822.2	703.5
Lowell, IN	10,747	5.28	13.66	2,037.2	786.6
Manteno, IL	10,437	6.01	15.56	1,736.8	670.6
Harvard, IL	9,376	4.36	11.30	2,148.7	829.6
Princeton, IL	7,979	6.20	16.06	1,287.1	497.0
Marengo, IL	7,509	3.81	9.86	1,971.5	761.2
Lake Holiday, IL	7,313	4.30	11.14	1,700.5	656.6
Mendota, IL	6,918	2.85	7.38	2,426.2	936.8
Wilmington, IL	6,388	3.95	10.23	1,617.3	624.5
McHenry Northwest–Wonder Lake, IL	5,758	2.35	6.08	2,453.6	947.4
Hampshire, IL	5,699	2.72	7.06	2,091.4	807.5
Rensselaer, IN	5,509	3.23	8.37	1,703.9	657.9
Genoa, IL	5,484	2.20	5.69	2,498.0	964.5
Westville, IN	5,189	2.10	5.45	2,466.0	952.1
Marseilles, IL	4,660	2.39	6.19	1,948.4	752.3

== Economy ==
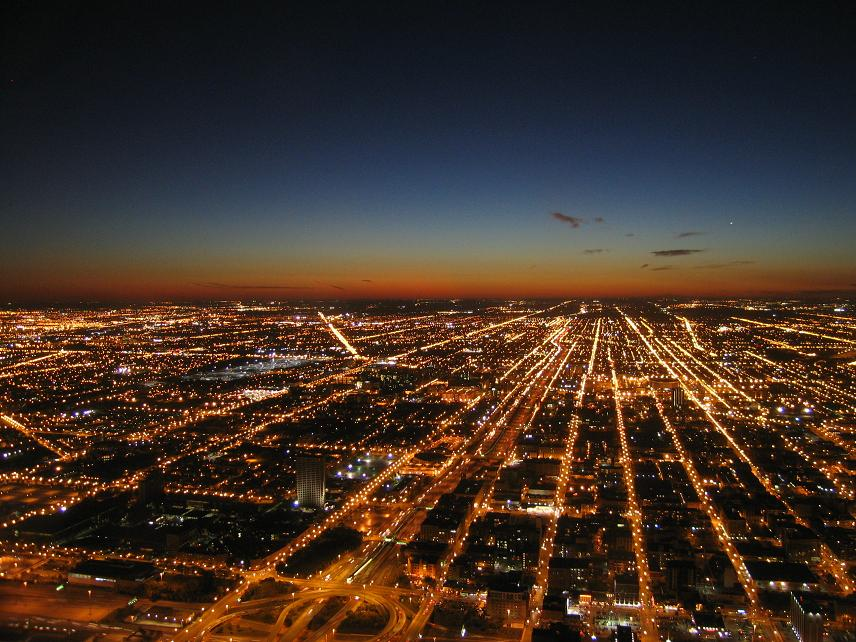
Westward view from the Willis Tower in Chicago

Trading floor in the Chicago Board of Trade Building

The Chicago metropolitan area is home to the corporate headquarters of 57 Fortune 1000 companies, including AbbVie Inc., Allstate, Archer Daniels Midland, Exelon, GE Healthcare, Kraft Heinz, McDonald's, Mondelez International, Motorola, United Airlines, Walgreens, and more. The Chicago area also headquarters a wide variety of global financial institutions including Morningstar, Inc. and CNA Financial. Chicago is home to the largest futures exchange in the world, the Chicago Mercantile Exchange. In March 2008, the Chicago Mercantile Exchange announced its acquisition of NYMEX Holdings Inc, the parent company of the New York Mercantile Exchange and Commodity Exchange. CME'S acquisition of NYMEX was completed in August 2008 to form CME Group. Until 2022, the Chicago area was home to corporate headquarters of Boeing, Caterpillar, Citadel LLC, and Tyson Foods.

A key piece of infrastructure for several generations was the Union Stock Yards of Chicago, which from 1865 until 1971 penned and slaughtered millions of cattle and hogs into standardized cuts of beef and pork. This prompted poet Carl Sandburg to describe Chicago as the "Hog Butcher for the World".

The Chicago area, meanwhile, began to produce significant quantities of telecommunications gear, electronics, steel, crude oil derivatives, automobiles, and industrial capital goods.

By the early 2000s, Illinois' economy had moved toward a dependence on high-value-added services, such as financial trading, higher education, logistics, and health care. In some cases, these services clustered around institutions that hearkened back to Illinois's earlier economies. For example, the Chicago Mercantile Exchange, a trading exchange for global derivatives, had begun its life as an agricultural futures market.

In 2007, the area ranked first among U.S. metro areas in the number of new and expanded corporate facilities. It ranked third in 2008, behind the Houston–Sugar Land–Baytown and Dallas–Fort Worth metropolitan areas, and ranked second behind the New York metropolitan area in 2009.

The Wall Street Journal summarized the Chicago area's economy in November 2006 with the comment that "Chicago has survived by repeatedly reinventing itself."

== Transportation ==
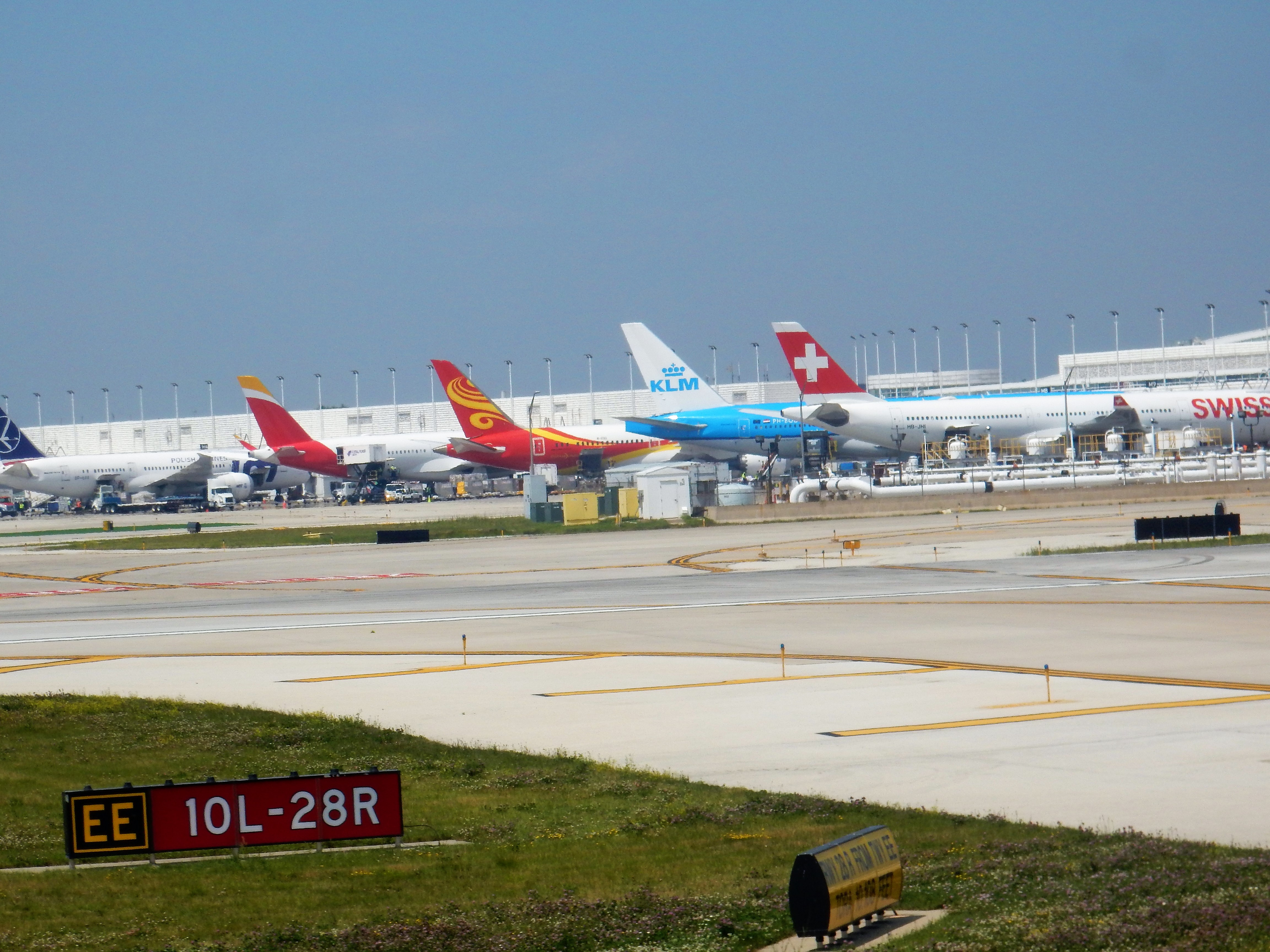
O'Hare International Airport

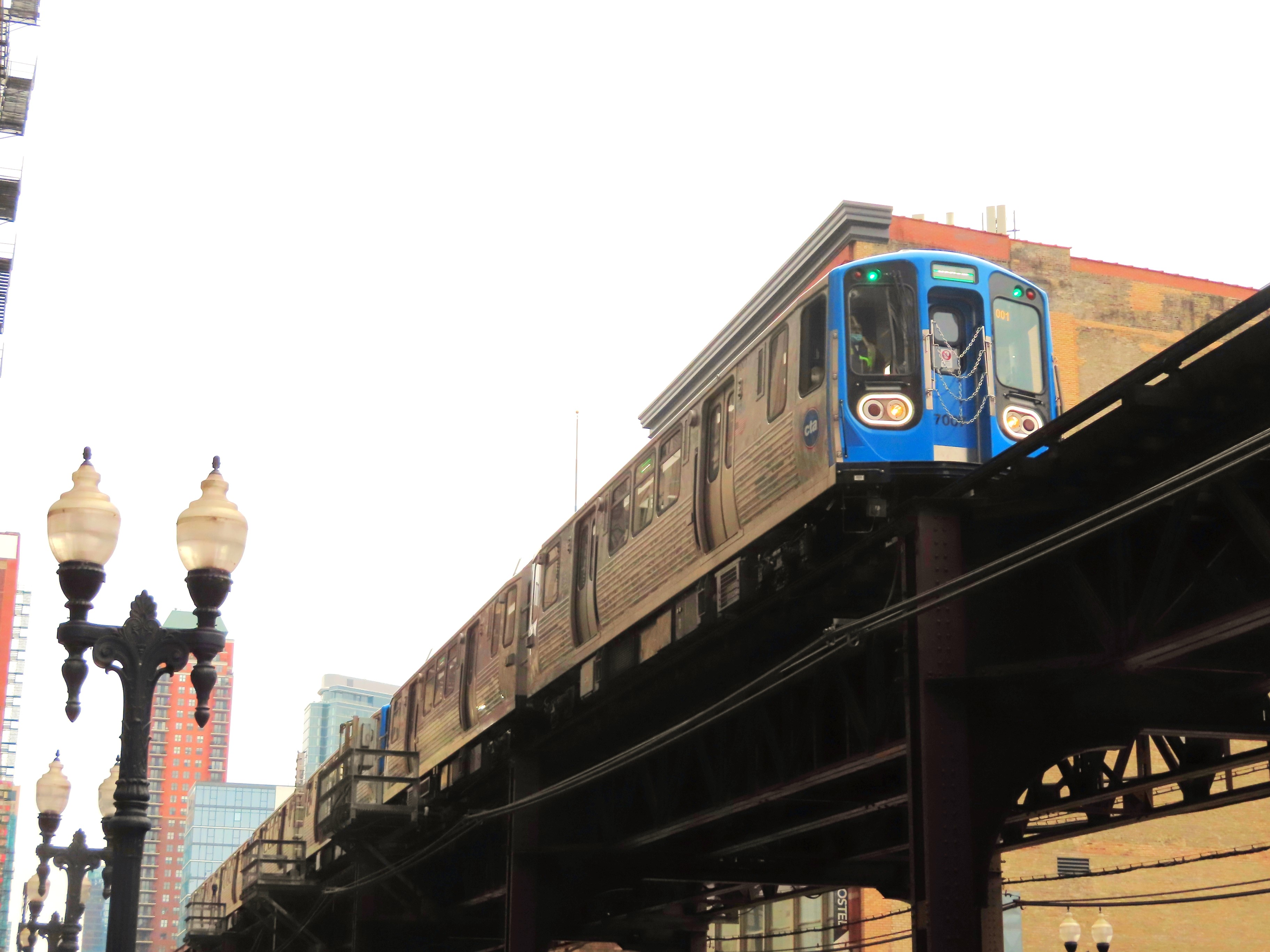
Chicago 'L' in the Loop

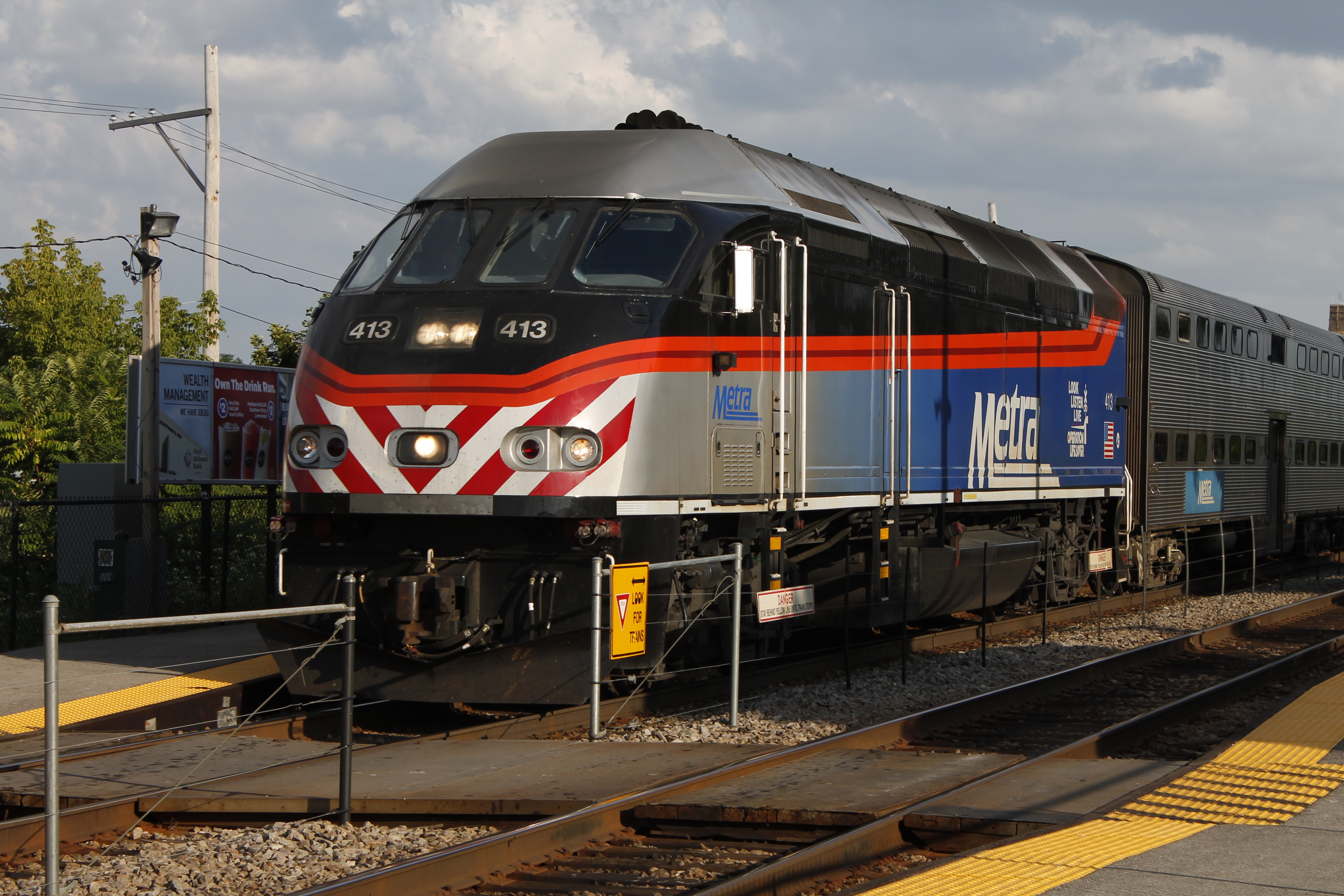
Metra commuter rail

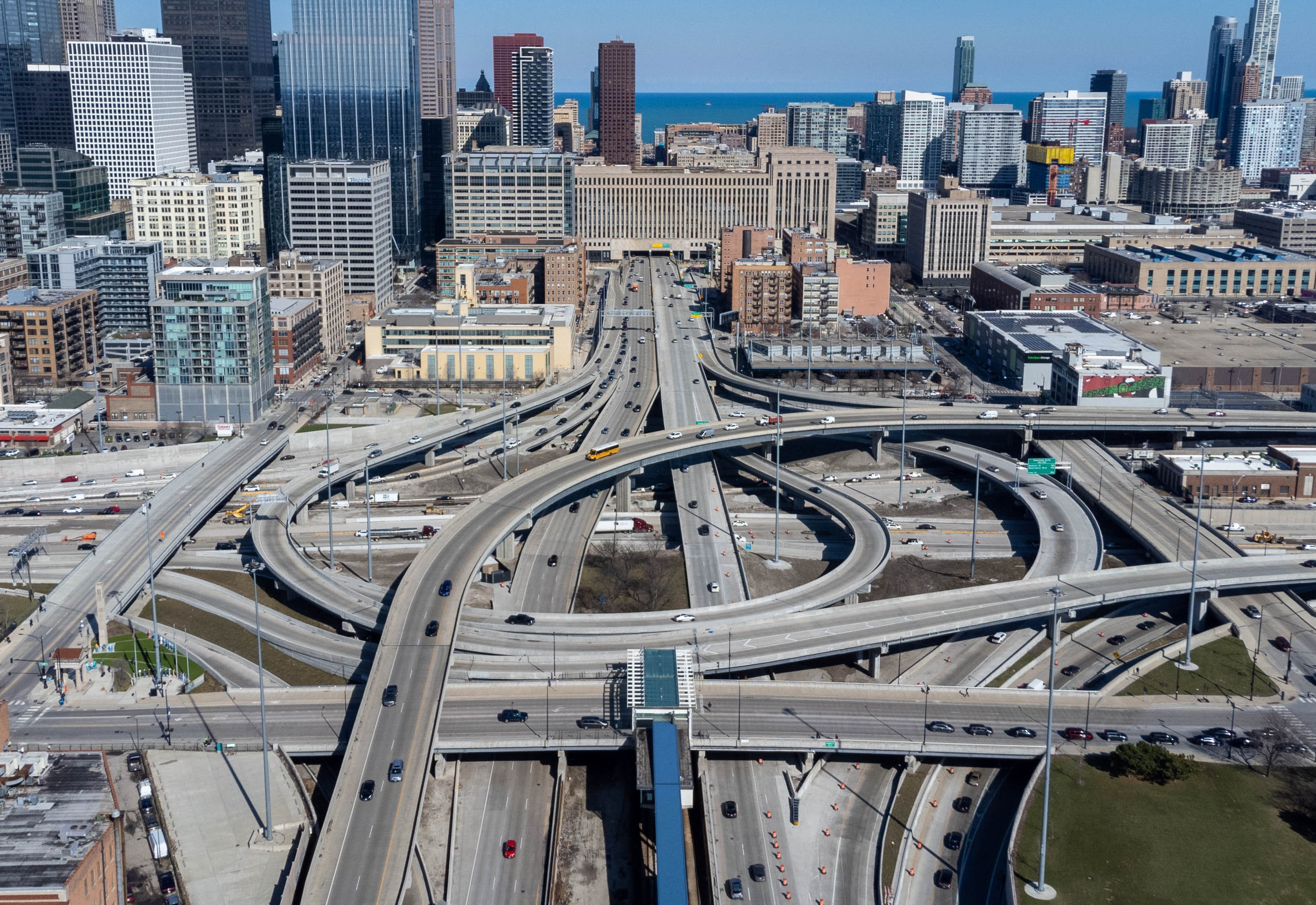
Jane Byrne Interchange

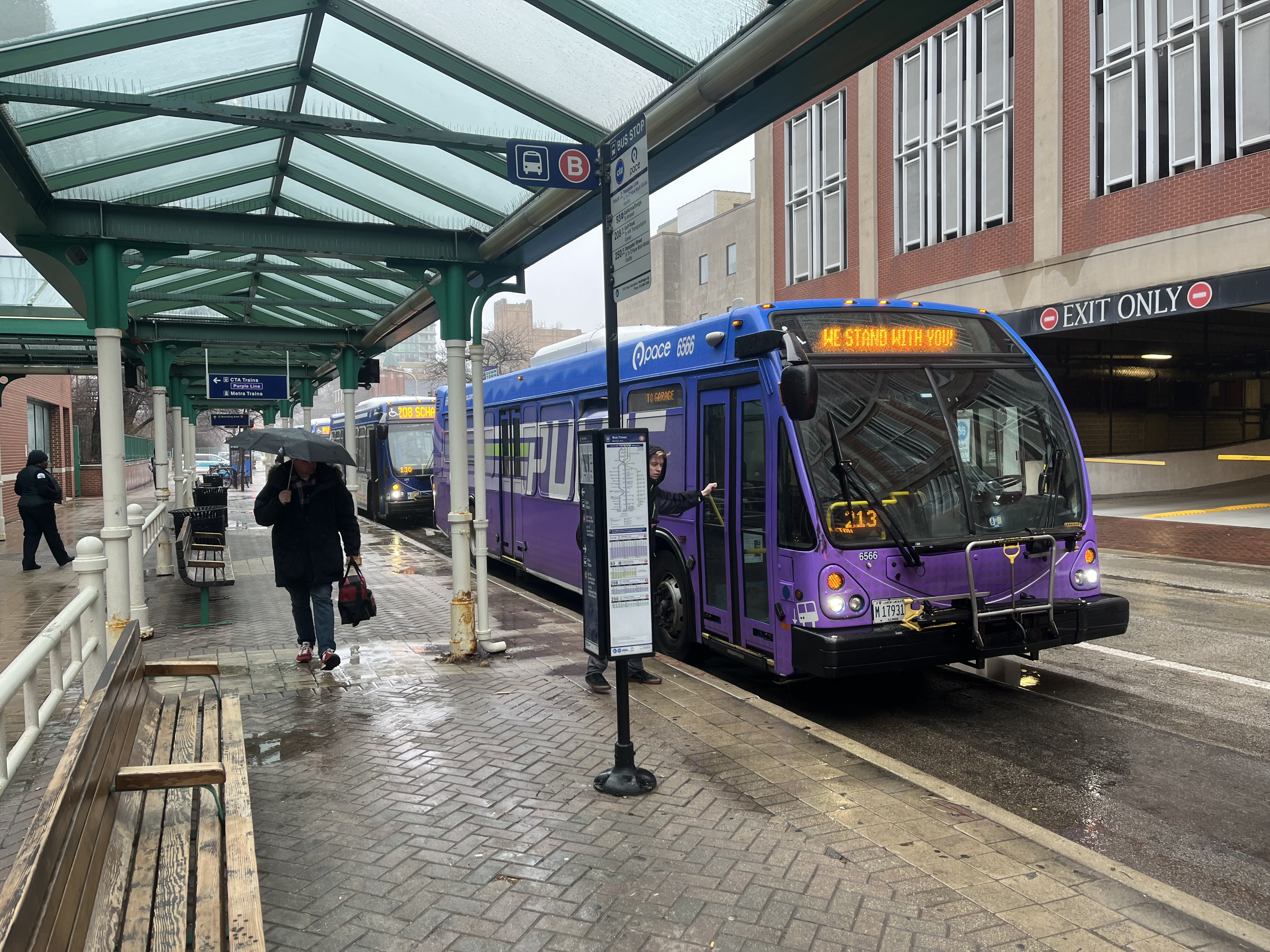
Pace Suburban Bus

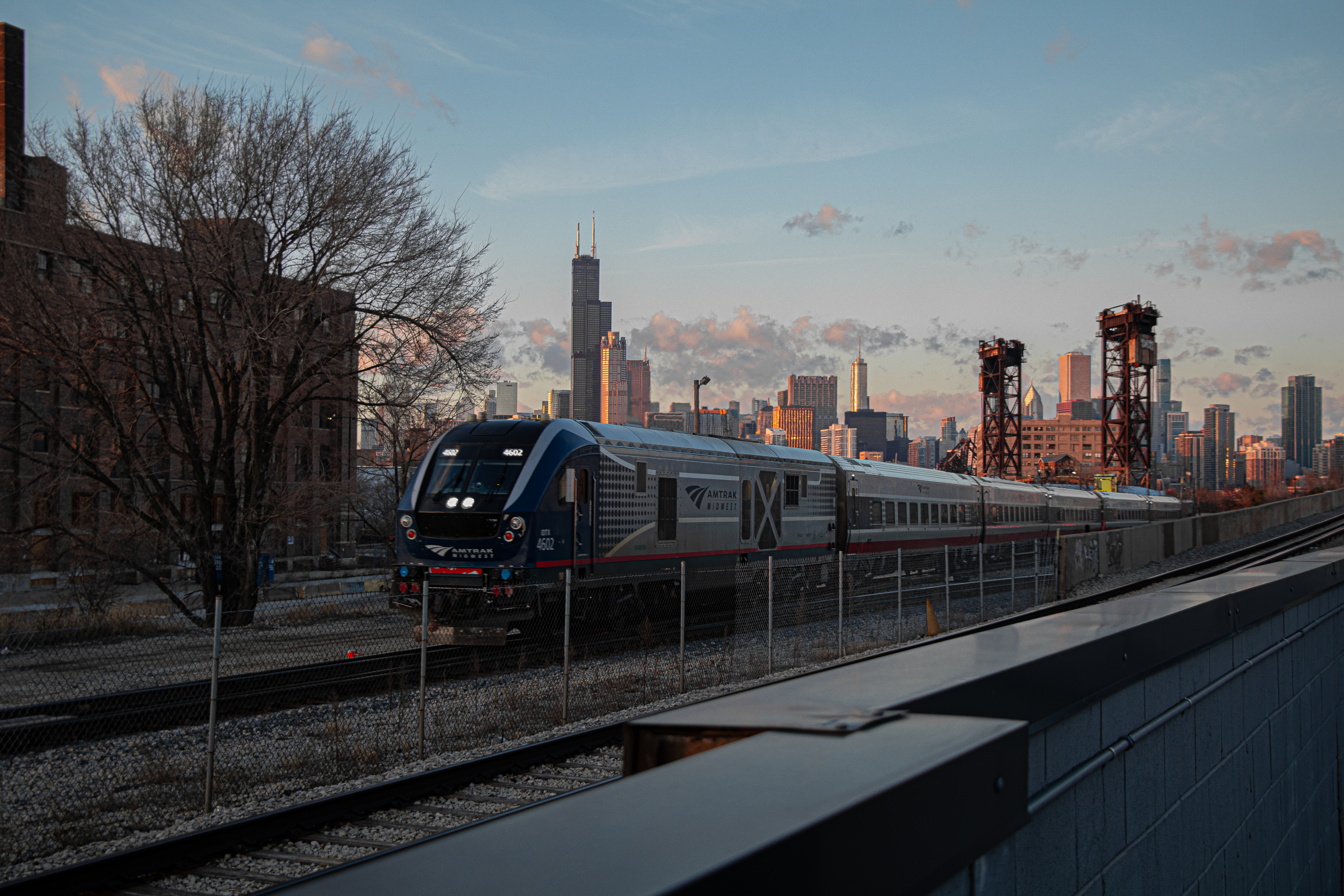
Amtrak inter-city rail

=== Major airports ===
- Chicago O'Hare International Airport (ORD)
- Chicago Midway International Airport (MDW)
- Milwaukee Mitchell International Airport (MKE) (located in the adjacent Milwaukee metropolitan area)
- Chicago Rockford International Airport (RFD) (located in the adjacent Rockford metropolitan area)
- Gary/Chicago International Airport (GYY)

=== Ports and harbors ===
- North Point Marina (Winthrop Harbor)
- Port of Chicago
- Port of Indiana-Burns Harbor
- Waukegan Harbor
- Wilmette Harbor

=== Commercial freight ===
Chicago has been at the center of the United States' railroad network since the 19th century. Almost all Class I railroads serve the area, the most in North America.

The CenterPoint Intermodal Center in Elwood, near Joliet, is considered to be the largest inland port in North America.

=== Public Transit ===
The Northern Illinois Transit Authority (NITA) coordinates and supports the operation of three transit service boards serving Cook, DuPage, Lake, Will, Kane, and McHenry Counties in Illinois, with one commuter rail line also serving Kenosha County, Wisconsin.

- Chicago Transit Authority (CTA) operates the Chicago "L" rapid transit system and numerous bus routes in the City of Chicago and some surrounding suburbs.
- Pace (NITA's Suburban Bus Division) operates regular suburban fixed-route bus services, an arterial rapid transit service known as Pulse, express buses on I-55 and I-90, regional vanpool, paratransit, and demand-response services in the Chicagoland region.
- Metra (NITA's Commuter Rail Division) operates commuter rail service between Chicago and numerous suburbs:
  - 4 lines serving southern Cook County and Will County
  - 3 lines serving western Cook County, DuPage County, and Kane County
  - 2 lines serving northern Cook County and Lake County
  - 1 line serving northern Cook County, Lake County, and Kenosha County
  - 1 line serving northwestern Cook County and McHenry County

The Northern Indiana Commuter Transportation District (NICTD) operates the South Shore Line, which provides commuter rail service from downtown Chicago (at Millennium Station) to Northwest Indiana. Since March 2026 it consists of two routes:

- Lakeshore Corridor to South Bend Airport via Lake (IN), Porter, LaPorte, and St. Joseph counties
- Monon Corridor to Munster/Dyer via Lake County, IN

Several other public transit systems serve counties not within the NITA region such as Kenosha Area Transit, Kenosha streetcar, DeKalb Public Transit, River Valley Metro MTD, SHOW BUS, East Chicago Transit, Gary Public Transportation Corporation, V-Line, ChicaGO Dash, and Michigan City Transit.

=== Passenger Rail ===
Chicago Union Station serves as the national and Midwest hub for Amtrak, the national passenger rail operator of the United States. The routes that serve Union Station include the Blue Water, Borealis, California Zephyr, Cardinal, City of New Orleans, Empire Builder, Floridian, Hiawatha Service, Illini/Saluki, Illinois Zephyr/Carl Sandburg, Lake Shore Limited, Lincoln Service, Pere Marquette, Southwest Chief, Texas Eagle, and Wolverine. There are also other Amtrak stations in Chicagoland:

- Glenview, IL - Hiawatha Service, Borealis, and Empire Builder
- Naperville, IL - Illinois Zephyr/Carl Sandburg, California Zephyr, and Southwest Chief
- LaGrange, IL - Illinois Zephyr/Carl Sandburg
- Summit, IL - Lincoln Service
- Joliet, IL - Lincoln Service and Texas Eagle
- Homewood, IL - Illini/Saluki and City of New Orleans
- Hammond-Whiting, IN - Wolverine
- Dyer, IN - Cardinal

=== Major highways ===
==== Interstates ====
- I-41 runs concurrently with I-94 from the northern terminus of the Tri-State Tollway to Milwaukee.
- I-55 is the Adlai Stevenson Expressway.
- I-57 is unofficially the "West Leg" of the Dan Ryan Expressway.
- I-65 has no name, whether official or unofficial.
- I-80 is officially called the Borman Expressway (cosigned with I-94), Kingery Expressway (cosigned with I-94 for 3 miles), Tri-State Tollway (cosigned with I-294 for 4 miles) and is unofficially called the Moline Expressway west of I-294.
- I-88 is the Ronald Reagan Memorial Tollway (formerly East-West Tollway)
- I-90 is locally known as Jane Addams Tollway (formerly Northwest Tollway), John F. Kennedy Expressway (cosigned with I-94), Dan Ryan Expressway (cosigned with I-94), and Chicago Skyway Toll Bridge.
- I-94 is the Tri-State Tollway in Lake County, Edens Spur, Edens Expy, John F. Kennedy Expy (cosigned with I-90), Dan Ryan Expy (cosigned with I-90), Bishop Ford Freeway (formerly Calumet Expressway), Kingery Expy (cosigned with I-80) and Borman Expy (cosigned with I-80).
- I-190 is the John F. Kennedy Expressway spur heading into Chicago-O'Hare Int'l Airport.
- I-290 is the Dwight D. Eisenhower Expressway.
- I-294 is the Tri-State Tollway.
- I-355 is the Veterans Memorial Tollway (formerly North-South Tollway).
- I-490 is the O'Hare West Bypass, a toll road currently under construction with a scheduled opening date of 2027.

==== Other main highways ====
- US Routes in the Illinois part of the area include: US 6, US 12, US 14, US 20, US 30, US 34, US 41, US 45, and US 52.
- Illinois Route 53, an arterial north–south state highway running through Grundy, Will, DuPage, Cook and Lake counties
- Illinois Route 137, also known as the Amstutz Expressway, in Lake County, Illinois
- Illinois Route 390, also known as the Elgin-O'Hare Tollway, in Cook and DuPage counties
- Illinois Route 394, also known as the Calumet Expressway, in Cook and Will counties
- Indiana State Road 912, also known as Cline Avenue, a freeway in Lake County, Indiana
- Historic US Route 66's eastern terminus is in Chicago.

==== Major corridors ====
In addition to the Chicago Loop, the metro area is home to a few important subregional corridors of commercial activities. Among them are:

- Golden Corridor, along the Jane Addams Memorial Tollway (I-90)
- Illinois Technology and Research Corridor, along the Ronald Reagan Memorial Tollway (I-88)
- Lakeshore Corridor, along the Edens Expressway and Tri-State Tollway (both I-94)

== Politics ==
The Chicagoland metro has long been a Democratic stronghold due to the Democratic strength concentrated in Cook County, more specifically in the city of Chicago and its many diverse suburbs. The Collar counties that border Cook County have historically leaned towards the Republican Party, but in recent election cycles they have increasingly shifted to the left.

McHenry County is the reddest collar county, as it is the only county out of the five collar counties that has continued to routinely elect Republicans statewide, having voted for the Republican candidate for president in the last four out of five United States presidential elections. Dekalb County, which is the westernmost county in the metro, is a Democratic leaning county, especially because of the demographically diverse city of Dekalb being home to NIU. Kankakee County and Grundy County, which are located to the south and southwest of Will County respectively, are the most Republican counties included in metro, particularly due to being more exurban and rural.

Chicagoland Presidential election results
Year	Democratic	Republican	Third parties
2024	61.9% 2,325,189	36.5% 1,336,204	2.5% 93,943
2020	66.1% 2,691,170	32.1% 1,306,077	1.8% 72,586
2016	64.4% 2,400,444	29.5% 1,099,170	6.1% 226,879
2012	64.0% 2,139,672	34.6% 1,156,797	1.4% 48,478
2008	67.6% 2,460,746	31.1% 1,134,317	1.3% 47,069
2004	60.3% 2,055,714	39.0% 1,331,401	0.7% 23,076
2000	59.2% 1,789,820	38.1% 1,151,288	2.7% 83,554

2000 Presidential Election by Township

2008 Presidential Election by Township

2012 Presidential Election by Township

2016 Presidential Election by Township

2020 Presidential Election by Township

2024 Presidential Election by Township

== Culture ==
=== Sports ===
Listing of the professional sports teams in the Chicago metropolitan area

Major league professional teams:

- Major League Baseball (MLB)
  - Chicago Cubs
  - Chicago White Sox
- National Football League (NFL)
  - Chicago Bears
- National Basketball Association (NBA)
  - Chicago Bulls
- National Hockey League (NHL)
  - Chicago Blackhawks
- Major League Soccer (MLS)
  - Chicago Fire FC
- Women's National Basketball Association (WNBA)
  - Chicago Sky
- National Women's Soccer League (NWSL)
  - Chicago Stars FC

Other professional teams:

- American Association of Professional Baseball (AA)
  - Chicago Dogs
  - Kane County Cougars
  - Gary SouthShore RailCats
- American Hockey League (AHL)
  - Chicago Wolves
- NBA G League (NBAGL)
  - Windy City Bulls
- Major League Rugby (MLR)
  - Chicago Hounds

The Chicagoland Speedway oval track has hosted NASCAR Cup Series and IndyCar Series races. The Chicago Marathon is one of the World Marathon Majors. The Western Open and BMW Championship are PGA Tour tournaments that have been held primarily at golf courses near Chicago.

NCAA Division I College Sports Teams:

- Atlantic 10 Conference
  - Loyola University Chicago Ramblers
- Big East Conference
  - DePaul University Blue Demons
- Big Ten Conference
  - Northwestern University Wildcats (Evanston)
- Mid-American Conference
  - Northern Illinois University Huskies (DeKalb)
- Missouri Valley Conference
  - University of Illinois Chicago Flames
  - Valparaiso University Beacons (Valparaiso, IN)
- Northeast Conference
  - Chicago State University Cougars

=== Cuisine ===
- Chicago-style hot dog
- Chicago-style pizza
- Italian beef
- Caramel popcorn
- Maxwell Street Polish
- Cake Shake
- Chicago Tavern Style Pizza
- Chicago Deep Dish Pizza

=== Media ===
The two main newspapers are the Chicago Tribune and the Chicago Sun-Times. Local television channels broadcasting to the Chicago market include WBBM-TV 2 (CBS), WMAQ-TV 5 (NBC), WLS-TV 7 (ABC), WGN-TV 9 (CW), WTTW 11 (PBS), MeTV 23, WCIU 26 (Ind), WFLD 32 (FOX), WCPX-TV 38 (Ion), WSNS-TV 44 (Telemundo), WPWR-TV 50 (MyNetworkTV), and WJYS-TV 62 (The Way). Radio stations serving the area include: WBBM (AM), WBEZ, WGN (AM), WMBI, WLS (AM), and WSCR.

== Education ==
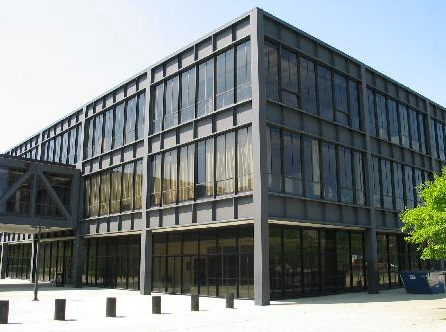
Whitney M. Young Magnet High School in Chicago

Elementary and secondary education within the Chicago metropolitan area is provided by dozens of different school districts, of which by far the largest is the Chicago Public Schools with 400,000 students. Numerous private and religious school systems are also found in the region, as well as a growing number of charter schools. Racial inequalities in education in the region remain widespread, often breaking along district boundaries; for instance, educational prospects vary widely for students in the Chicago Public Schools compared to those in some neighboring suburban schools.

Historically, the Chicago metropolitan area has been at the center of a number of national educational movements, from the free-flowing Winnetka Plan to the regimented Taylorism of the Gary Plan. In higher education, University of Chicago founder William Rainey Harper was a leading early advocate of the junior college movement; Joliet Junior College is the nation's oldest continuously operating junior college today. Later U of C president Robert Maynard Hutchins was central to the Great Books movement, and programs of dialogic education arising from that legacy can be found today at the U of C, at Shimer College, and in the City Colleges of Chicago and Oakton College in the Northwest suburbs.

== Area codes ==
From 1947 until 1988, the Illinois portion of the Chicago metro area was served by a single area code, 312, which abutted the 815 area code. In 1988 the 708 area code was introduced and the 312 area code became exclusive to the city of Chicago.

It became common to call suburbanites "708'ers", in reference to their area code.

The 708 area code was partitioned in 1996 into three area codes, serving different portions of the metro area: 630, 708, and 847.

At the same time that the 708 area code was running out of phone numbers, the 312 area code in Chicago was also exhausting its supply of available numbers. As a result, the city of Chicago was divided into two area codes, 312 and 773. Rather than divide the city by a north–south area code, the central business district retained the 312 area code, while the remainder of the city took the new 773 code.

In 2002, the 847 area code was supplemented with the overlay area code 224. In February 2007, the 815 area code (serving outlying portions of the metro area) was supplemented with the overlay area code 779. In October 2007, the overlay area code 331 was implemented to supplement the 630 area with additional numbers.

Plans are in place for overlay codes in the 708, 773, and 312 regions as those area codes become exhausted in the future.

- 312 Chicago - City (The Loop and central neighborhoods, e.g. the Near North Side, Near West Side, Near South Side)
- 773 Chicago - City (Everywhere else within the city limits, excluding central area)
- 872 Chicago - City (overlay for 312 & 773, effective November 7, 2009)
- 847/224 (North and Northwest Suburbs)
- 630/331 (Outer Western Suburbs)
- 708 (South and Near West Suburbs)
- 815/779 (Rockford & Joliet: Far Northwest/Southwest Suburbs)
- 219 (Northwest Indiana)
- 574 (North-central Indiana)
- 262 (Southeast Wisconsin surrounding Milwaukee County)

=== Proposed overlays ===
- 464 overlay for 708 (January 21, 2022, rollout)

== See also ==
- Index of Illinois-related articles
