= Gretchen Whitmer kidnapping plot =

2020 plot to kidnap the Governor of Michigan

- Part of Domestic terrorism in the United States
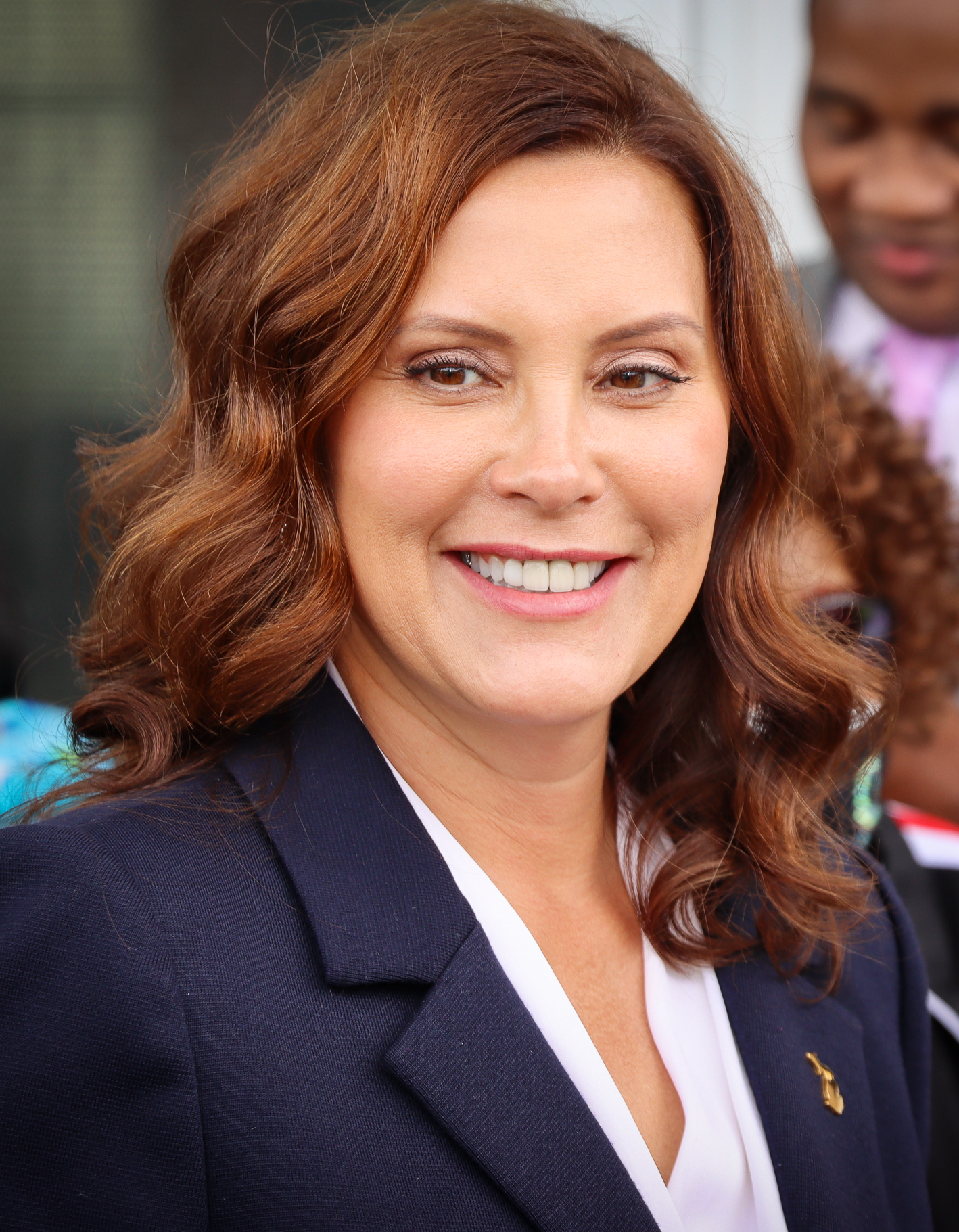
- Governor of Michigan Gretchen Whitmer in 2021
- Type: Kidnapping plot, conspiracy
- Motive: Retaliation for Whitmer's handling of the COVID-19 pandemic in Michigan
- Target: Gretchen Esther Whitmer
- Accused: Daniel Harris; Brandon Caserta; Eric Molitor; Michael Null; William Null; Joseph M. Morrison; Paul Bellar; Pete Musico
- Convicted: Ty Garbin; Kaleb Franks; Adam Fox; Barry Croft; Brian Higgins; Shawn Fix
- Charges: Federal: Fox, Garbin, Croft, Franks, Harris, Caserta: Conspiring to commit kidnapping Fox, Croft, Harris: Conspiracy to use weapons of mass destruction State: Musico, Morrison, Fix, Molitor, Michael and William Null, Bellar, Higgins: Providing material support for terrorist acts Fix, Molitor, Michael and William Null: Firearms offenses Musico, Morrison, Bellar: Gang membership
- Verdict: Federal: Garbin, Franks: Pleaded guilty Caserta, Harris: Not guilty Fox, Croft: Hung jury (first trial); Guilty (second trial); State: Fix, Higgins: Pleaded guilty Bellar, Morrison, Musico: Guilty, verdict overturned on appeal Michael and William Null, Molitor: Not guilty
- Convictions: Federal: Garbin, Franks: Conspiracy to commit kidnapping Fox, Croft: Conspiracy to use weapons of mass destruction State: Bellar, Morrison, Musico (overturned on appeal), Fix: Providing material support for terrorist acts Bellar, Morrison, Musico (overturned on appeal): Gang membership Higgins: Attempting to provide material support for terrorist acts
- Sentence: Federal: Garbin: 2 1/2 years in prison plus a $2,500 fine Franks: 4 years in prison Fox: 16 years in prison Croft: 19 years and 7 months in prison

On October 8, 2020, the U.S. Federal Bureau of Investigation (FBI) announced the arrests of 13 men suspected of orchestrating a domestic terror plot to kidnap Gretchen Whitmer, the governor of Michigan, and otherwise using violence to overthrow the state government. Some have labeled the attempt as an example of stochastic terrorism, where violent rhetoric by prominent figures inspired the plot. Half of the suspects were tied to a paramilitary militia group that called themselves the Wolverine Watchmen. Six of the suspects were charged in federal court, while the other seven were charged with state crimes. A week later, a fourteenth suspect was arrested and charged in state court.

Two men pleaded guilty and offered to testify on behalf of the prosecution as part of a favorable plea deal, while two men were acquitted at trial. Two other men, who had received a hung jury at the first trial, were later convicted of kidnapping conspiracy and conspiracy to possess weapons of mass destruction. One of those men was also convicted of another explosives charge.

Three other men were later convicted of felony counts of gang membership, providing material support to terrorism, and illegal weapons possession in the first state trial stemming from the case. However, the convictions of these men were later overturned on appeal in 2026. Two more defendants pleaded guilty at a later trial to providing or attempting to provide material support, whereas three others were acquitted. The defense has argued that this is a case of entrapment, claiming to have identified twelve FBI informants. They contend that the entire plot was fabricated by federal agents.

== Background ==
=== Prior concerns about militia and far-right groups ===
Preceding the 2020 United States elections, law enforcement officials, members of Congress, and groups tracking extremism in the country warned about the increasing threat potential from militia and far-right groups. The Anti-Defamation League identified Michigan as a state where the modern militia movement found its roots and where a number of militia groups remain active. However, Jon Lewis, a research fellow at the Program on Extremism at George Washington University, said the Wolverine Watchmen group, which the suspects were members of, "flew under the radar", adding, "This is simply not a big group that we'd ever heard of."

The Wolverine Watchmen group was reportedly an offshoot of the Michigan Militia. The day after the suspects were arrested, the Michigan Militia issued a statement disavowing the group. Other Michigan-based militia groups also distanced themselves from the plotters' actions and intentions. The Michigan Home Guard, a militia that one of the suspects had once been a member of before being kicked out in 2020, released a statement condemning the Wolverine Watchmen's actions.

The plot to kidnap Governor Gretchen Whitmer developed from June through September. Within the week preceding the Wolverine Watchmen arrests, there were at least three other state and federal arrest operations linked to the boogaloo movement, to which the Wolverine Watchmen group's ideology closely aligned.

=== COVID-19 pandemic and mitigation measures in Michigan ===
Whitmer, the main target of the plot, had seen her political profile elevated over the preceding months due to her early response to the outbreak of COVID-19 in Michigan, in which she enacted strict statewide mitigation measures such as a lockdown of the state. A Democrat, Gov. Whitmer garnered national attention for what some advocacy groups and experts called overly restrictive stay-at-home and social distancing orders. She also became a target of certain local militia groups, while multiple advocacy groups organized protests against lockdowns throughout April and May. President Donald Trump offered his support for the protests, calling Whitmer anti-business and by the moniker, "that woman from Michigan" and tweeting on April 17: "LIBERATE MICHIGAN!" (Note: The FBI later said the plot was hatched before that tweet was posted.) Two weeks later, on April 30, armed protestors entered the Michigan State Capitol.

Ultimately, on October 2, 2020, the Michigan Supreme Court made two rulings in response to the executive branch’s approach to shutdown, as the power to exact significant shutdown specifics, e.g. in emergency scenarios, were in contest by interested members representing districts within Michigan’s legislative bodies. The first was a 4–3 ruling that declared a 1945 law—which Whitmer had attempted using—unconstitutional. The second was a unanimous ruling that declared a 1976 act did not give Whitmer the power to enact the measures without legislative approval. Administrative officials in the Michigan Department of Health and Human Services – and later, the Michigan Occupational Safety and Health Administration – disagreed with the legislature and circumvented the Supreme Court’s ruling and Legislature by ordering similar measures as Whitmer.

== Participants in the plot ==
The suspected participants were tied to a paramilitary militia group that called themselves the Wolverine Watchmen. The group was co-founded by Pete Musico and Joseph Morrison; the latter is considered the group's "commander". An NBC News investigation into the suspects' social media profiles found links between their ideologies and those of the broader boogaloo movement. The Wolverine Watchmen group recruited members on Facebook from November 2019 until June 2020, when Facebook purged all boogaloo-related material.

The suspects named in the federal indictment, charged with conspiracy to commit kidnapping, were Adam Fox, Ty Garbin, Barry Croft, Kaleb Franks, Daniel Harris, and Brandon Caserta. Five of the men were Michigan residents, while the sixth, Croft, was from Delaware. Adam Fox and Barry Croft were accused of being the ringleaders of the plot. The suspects charged with state crimes, including providing material support for terrorist acts, firearm crimes, and gang membership, were Wolverine Watchmen founders Musico and Morrison, along with Shawn Fix, Eric Molitor, Michael Null, William Null, and Paul Bellar. At least four of the 13 suspects had attended prior rallies at the Michigan State Capitol. On October 15, a fourteenth suspect, Brian Higgins of Wisconsin, was charged at the state level with material support of an act of terrorism. Garbin pleaded guilty on January 27, 2021, and agreed to testify against his five alleged co-conspirators.

Summary table
Participant	Charges	Verdict	Sentence	Incarcerated at
Adam Fox	Kidnapping conspiracy and conspiracy to use a weapon of mass destruction	Guilty	16 years	United States Penitentiary, Florence High
Joseph M. Morrison	Materially aiding a terrorist and membership in a gang	Guilty	10 to 20 years	Federal Correctional Institution, Pekin (until June 20, 2024)
Ty Garbin	Conspiracy to commit kidnapping	Pleaded guilty	6 years and 3 months, later reduced to 2 years and 6 months	Van Buren County Jail
Barry Croft	Kidnapping conspiracy, conspiracy to use a weapon of mass destruction, and possessing an unregistered destructive device	Guilty	19 years and 7 months	ADX Florence
Kaleb Franks	Conspiracy to commit kidnapping	Pleaded guilty	4 years	Federal Correctional Institution, Terre Haute (until March 29, 2024)
Daniel Harris	Conspiracy to commit kidnapping	Not guilty	Acquitted	—N/a
Brandon Caserta	Conspiracy to commit kidnapping	Not guilty	Acquitted	—N/a
Pete Musico	Materially aiding a terrorist and membership in a gang	Guilty	12 to 20 years	Federal Correctional Institution, Gilmer (until December 12, 2024)
Shawn Fix	Providing material support for terrorist acts; a gun crime	Pleaded guilty	3 to 20 years	Charles Egeler Reception and Guidance Center
Eric Molitor	Providing material support for terrorist acts; a gun crime	Not guilty	Acquitted	—N/a
Michael Null	Providing material support for terrorist acts; a gun crime	Not guilty	Acquitted	—N/a
William Null	Providing material support for terrorist acts; a gun crime	Not guilty	Acquitted	—N/a
Paul Bellar	Materially aiding a terrorist and gang membership	Guilty	7 to 20 years	Federal Correctional Institution, Schuylkill (until July 9, 2024)
Brian Higgins	Material support of an act of terrorism	Pleaded guilty	3 years of probation	—N/a

=== Adam Fox ===
Adam Fox was considered the mastermind of the plot. He was born Adam Dean Waggoner but changed his last name to his mother's maiden name in 2014. He was living in the basement of his former employer, a vacuum cleaner repair shop in Grand Rapids. Fox received permission for that living arrangement from the shop's owner who felt empathy towards Fox, as Fox was homeless and had pet dogs. The basement was used to hold multiple meetings discussing the plot.

Fox posted a YouTube video in June, mentioning Whitmer's handling of the pandemic as one of his motives for the plot. According to his employer, Fox espoused anti-police and anti-government views, along with support for the boogaloo movement, and had recently become worried about the U.S. becoming a communist country and Democratic politicians taking away his guns. Fox had previously been a member of another militia group called the Michigan Home Guard, but he was kicked out due to "rage issues" and threatening other members on social media.

While under surveillance, Fox was recorded by the FBI as saying "Snatch and grab, man. Grab the fuckin' governor. Just grab the bitch. Because at that point, we do that... it's over" and "I want to have the governor hog-tied, laid out on a table, while we all pose around like we just made the world's biggest goddamn drug bust, bro." Fox was convicted in federal court for kidnapping conspiracy and conspiracy to use a weapon of mass destruction. He faced a maximum sentence of life in prison. On December 27, 2022, he was sentenced to 16 years.

=== Joseph M. Morrison ===
Joseph M. Morrison is considered the leader of the Wolverine Watchmen. His home in Munith, which he shared with Musico, was used as a training site. Photographs of the home show a Confederate battle flag and a variation of the U.S. flag with alternating, vertical red and white stripes and a circle of stars surrounding the words "Liberty or Death". Morrison's neighbors told The Daily Beast that the home's residents were "disrespectful" and said large groups regularly gathered there on weekends, whereupon gunfire would be heard. His online alias was "Boogaloo Bunyan".

Morrison had served in the U.S. Marine Corps since 2015, most recently with the 4th Marine Logistics Group in Battle Creek, Michigan, with the rank of lance corporal; he was discharged from the Marine Corps Reserve on October 8, the same day as his arrest, for reasons unrelated to the criminal charges. Morrison is the son-in-law of co-defendant Pete Musico. In October 2022, Morrison was convicted in Michigan state court of materially aiding a terrorist and being a member of a gang. On December 15, 2022, he was sentenced to 10 to 20 years in prison.

Morrison's conviction was overturned by the Michigan Court of Appeals in June 2026. The court found that jurors had been told to consider kidnapping as an underlying violent felony which could support a terrorism conviction when it was not defined as such by state law, which tainted Morrison's conviction. Prosecutors vowed to appeal to the Michigan Supreme Court.

=== Ty Garbin ===
Ty Garbin was raised in Wyandotte but was living in a manufactured home park in eastern Livingston County at the time of his arrest. His father is an Army veteran. Garbin was a licensed aircraft mechanic and had previously worked for SkyWest Airlines. He met Fox at a Second Amendment rally in Lansing. Garbin cased the governor's vacation home at night, texted about blowing up a bridge to slow police down, offered to paint his boat for "night fishing" as part of the kidnapping mission on the lake, and had the ability to manufacture guns. His lawyer mentioned he had no criminal record. Although convicted on federal charges, Garbin was held at Van Buren County jail rather than in federal prison due to the potential danger he faced from extremists and prison gangs. After pleading guilty, Garbin was sentenced in August 2021 to 75 months in prison. Due to his cooperation with investigators, and the subsequent convictions of Fox and Croft, a judge reduced his sentence to 30 months in September 2022.

=== Barry Croft Jr. ===
Barry Croft Jr. regularly posted violent messages on his social media accounts. These accounts depicted him wearing a tricorne and a sweatshirt with an insignia associated with the Three Percenters militia group; he was later identified as the second-in-command of its Wisconsin branch. The FBI identified him as a national leader of the organization in January 2021. He expressed support for the Russia investigation origins conspiracy theory and opposition to the country's current immigration policy, and he believed the investigations into President Trump constituted an "uprising". He also included Trump's name in a grievance-filled hit-list of politicians that he wanted to hang, which he posted on Facebook in late June. He was living in Bear, Delaware, at the time of his arrest.

Croft was arrested multiple times from 1994 to 1996 for assault and burglary. He was convicted in 1997 for possessing a gun in the commission of a felony and spent three years in prison. In April 2019, Croft was pardoned for the conviction, as well as the prior assault and burglary charges, by Delaware Governor John Carney. According to recordings of the plotters, Croft claimed he was granted permission from God to commit murder. Croft was convicted in federal court for kidnapping conspiracy, conspiracy to use a weapon of mass destruction, and possessing an unregistered destructive device. In December 2022 he was sentenced to 19 years and seven months in federal prison.

=== Kaleb Franks ===
Kaleb Franks had spent $4,000 on the equipment during the planning, including a helmet and night-vision goggles. He also brought a rifle with a suppressor to one of the training exercises. According to his LinkedIn profile, he studied psychology at Washtenaw Community College and was employed as a peer recovery coach at an addiction treatment center in Waterford. He had battled an addiction to heroin but had been sober since 2013, according to his lawyer. He was convicted in 2011 for cocaine possession, and for second-degree home invasion in 2013. He served nine months in jail and two years under the jurisdiction of drug courts. He testified that he was motivated by a desire to die: Because much of his family had died, he "didn't want to live anymore" and secretly hoped to be killed by police in a shootout. Franks pleaded guilty to kidnapping conspiracy and was sentenced to four years in prison by a federal judge.

=== Daniel Harris ===
Daniel Harris served in the U.S. Marine Corps as a rifleman from 2014 to June 2019; most recently at Marine Corps Base Camp Lejeune in Jacksonville, North Carolina. Harris deployed to Japan, where he reached the rank of corporal. He was awarded the Humanitarian Service Medal, the Marine Corps Good Conduct Medal, and the Global War on Terrorism Service Medal. He worked as a security guard at two different companies after being discharged. In June, he attended a Black Lives Matter rally in his hometown of Lake Orion. In an interview for a local newspaper, he said he was "upset about the killing of George Floyd and police violence."

Eight of the suspected conspirators met at Harris's home on August 23 to discuss the plot. While under surveillance, Harris was recorded by the FBI as saying, "Have one person go to her (Whitmer's) house. Knock on the door, and when she answers it just cap her... at this point. Fuck it." Harris was the only defendant to take the stand in his own defense in the first federal trial. In April 2022, Harris was acquitted of all charges.

=== Brandon Caserta ===
Brandon Caserta, a Canton resident, was shown wearing a Hawaiian-style shirt associated with the boogaloo movement in a TikTok video, and, on Facebook, he praised Kyle Rittenhouse, a teenager who shot three individuals (killing two of them) during the Kenosha unrest in August. Caserta was also a COVID-19 denier and supported the QAnon conspiracy theory; however, in one video, he criticized President Trump and called him a tyrant. His belief system apparently became more extreme following Whitmer's implementation of a statewide lockdown to reduce SARS-CoV-2 transmission. His social media activity originally consisted of posts about comedy shows and podcasts, motivational quotes, and selfies, but, following the lockdown, he began "liking" posts about conspiracy theories regarding Bill Gates, as well as memes about hogtying police officers.

While under surveillance, Caserta was recorded by the FBI saying, "When the time comes, there will be no need to try and strike fear through presence. The fear will be manifested through bullets," and, "If this whole thing starts to happen. I'm telling you what, dude, I'm taking out as many of those motherfuckers as I can. Every single one, dude. Every single one." In April 2022, Caserta was acquitted by a jury of all charges relating to the plot.

=== Pete Musico ===
Pete Musico was active on YouTube, where he posted videos against taxes, gun control, and the so-called deep state. A video posted in 2019, entitled "Gretchen Whitmer Interview", depicted him railing against her policies around automobile ownership and promised he would interview Whitmer in person in a later video. Musico was also active on Gab, where he promoted the unfounded claim that there is an ongoing campaign to kill white people in South Africa. He also followed the accounts of Proud Boys organizer Joe Biggs and InfoWars personality Owen Shroyer. On Twitter, he expressed support for Trump and conspiracy theories regarding Bill and Hillary Clinton and the high presence of mercury in vaccines. Musico's attorney said he was eventually kicked out of the Wolverine Watchmen because he was too "soft" and would not commit to violence. Musico is the father-in-law of co-defendant Joseph Morrison. In October 2022, Musico was convicted in Michigan state court of materially aiding a terrorist and being a member of a gang. On December 15, 2022, he was sentenced to 12 to 20 years in prison.

Musico and Bellar's convictions were overturned by the Michigan Court of Appeals on July 20, 2026, a month after the same court overturned the conviction of Joseph Morrison. The court stated that kidnapping was not an underlying violent felony under Michigan state law and could not be used to support a terrorism conviction. Attorney General Dana Nessel called the decision "linguistic gymnastics" and vowed to appeal all three decisions to the Michigan Supreme Court.

=== Shawn Fix ===
Shawn Fix hosted Wolverine Watchmen meetings at his home in Belleville to discuss the plot. The house's yard had Donald Trump presidential campaign signs and a Gadsden flag. He was working as a truck driver, and had more than a dozen driving infractions from 2007 to 2018. Fix was charged with assault and battery and aggravated assault in 2012, but the victim dropped the charges in 2013. Fix was one of five suspects turned over for trial on December 7, 2022. They were accused of providing material support for terrorist acts as well as a gun crime. Fix pleaded guilty to the terrorism charge on June 7, 2023, as part of a deal that included the weapons charge being dismissed, and on December 7 he was sentenced to between three and twenty years of imprisonment.

=== Eric Molitor ===
Eric Molitor, a Cadillac resident, had posted support of the boogaloo movement on his Facebook profile. He also spoke positively about Kyle Rittenhouse and the St. Louis gun-toting controversy, along with an anti-government sentiment. He had worked for a company that provides respiratory and ballistic protection to the military and first responders. In January 2020, he gave the Wexford County Commission a proposal to make it a Second Amendment sanctuary county, which passed unanimously the next month. Molitor was one of five suspects turned over for trial on December 7, 2022. They were accused of providing material support for terrorist acts as well as a gun crime. Molitor's trial opened in August 2023, and on September 15 he was acquitted of all charges.

=== The Null brothers ===
Michael and William Null, twin brothers, allegedly helped conduct surveillance on Whitmer's vacation home. They were also former members of another militia group called Michigan Liberty Militia. They were photographed at a protest held by Michigan United for Liberty, a right-wing group protesting against Whitmer's COVID-19 lockdown orders, at the Michigan State Capitol on April 30. William also attended another anti-lockdown rally in May, as well as Black Lives Matter rallies in Grand Rapids and Flint, according to Barry County Sheriff Dar Leaf, though Leaf also said William vented about the movement. William was also photographed at a February 2017 protest against President Trump's Executive Order 13769, held by the Equality Caucus of Genesee County in Flint. He and members of the Michigan Liberty Militia were counter-protesting while wearing military fatigues, carrying firearms, and waving a Gadsden flag. William also allegedly made threats against the protesters on Facebook. According to William, both he and his brother attended gun drills and helped to scout Governor Whitmer's home, but refused to take part in the plot once Fox suggested getting explosives. The brothers were two of the five suspects turned over for trial on December 7, 2022. They were accused of providing material support for terrorist acts as well as a gun crime. Their trial opened in August 2023 alongside Molitor, and on September 15 they were acquitted of all charges.

=== Paul Bellar ===
Paul Bellar, who was arrested in Columbia, South Carolina, where he had moved from Milford over the summer after an eviction, was responsible for designing the tactical training exercises used by the Wolverine Watchmen, which included the use of firearms, medical treatment, and other tasks. Bellar's former neighbor in Milford said the pandemic caused Bellar to lose his job and called him a "very angry person" and said he threatened her with a gun after a run-in with him. According to Bellar's father, he trained for the U.S. Army at Fort Jackson for a year before being discharged in 2019 with a diagnosis of post-traumatic stress disorder. Bellar was convicted in October 2022 in Michigan state court of providing "material support" for a terrorist act, membership in a gang, and a gun crime. On December 15, 2022, he was sentenced to seven to 20 years in prison.

Musico and Bellar's convictions were overturned by the Michigan Court of Appeals on July 20, 2026, a month after the same court overturned the conviction of Joseph Morrison. The court stated that kidnapping was not an underlying violent felony under Michigan state law and could not be used to support a terrorism conviction. Attorney General Dana Nessel called the decision "linguistic gymnastics" and vowed to appeal all three decisions to the Michigan Supreme Court.

=== Brian Higgins ===
Brian Higgins was a resident of Wisconsin Dells, Wisconsin, when he was arrested on October 15. He was alleged to have provided his night-vision goggles and dashcam to help conduct surveillance on Whitmer's home. Higgins was one of five suspects turned over for trial on December 7, 2022. He was charged with providing material support for terrorist acts. On March 15, 2023, Higgins pleaded guilty to attempting to provide material support for an act of terrorism and agreed to cooperate with prosecutors against the other four defendants at trial, set for August 2023. As part of his plea, Higgins admitted that he had scouted Whitmer's home with a camera attached to his truck and apologised to her and her family. On December 7 he was sentenced to three years of probation.

== FBI informants and agents ==
Defense attorneys have argued that at least twelve informants and/or undercover agents for the FBI were embedded among the suspected planners. The FBI has acknowledged using three informants and two undercover agents in their investigation. The investigation was overseen by Steven D'Antuono, Special Agent in Charge of the FBI's Detroit Field Office.

=== Informants ===
- Dan Chappel (born c. 1987), nicknamed "Big Dan", an Army veteran who served in the Iraq War. He has stated that he joined the Wolverine Watchmen in 2020 after finding them on Facebook, wanting to keep up his firearms skills, but contacted law enforcement after seeing the group's radicalization. After becoming an informant, Chappel became the group's "XO", or executive officer, the second-highest rank in the group, and then its highest-ranked officer after Morrison departed the group due to marital problems. Chappel taught the group tactical skills he had learned in the U.S. Army, offered the group use of a credit card (paid for by the FBI) to buy ammunition and supplies, and in summer 2020 spent hours on the phone with Fox planning the kidnapping.
- Steve Robeson, a convicted felon whose previous crimes include theft, insurance fraud, and sex with a minor. He attended five of the group's meetings. Various defense attorneys have stated that he paid for room and lodging for some of the group's meetings using government funds, including the June 2020 meeting in Ohio where the kidnap plot was hatched.
- Jenny Plunk, who knew Robeson before becoming an informant, and who attended many of the same meetings as Robeson. She was entrusted by the FBI with, among other things, keeping Croft within the group's good graces after some members of the group became frustrated with him.

=== Agents ===
- Mark Schweers, an FBI Special Agent who went by the name Mark Woods while undercover. He made secret audio recordings of both Fox and Croft.
- Timothy Bates, an FBI Special Agent who went by the name "Red" while undercover. He pretended to have access to bomb-making materials.

== Timeline of events ==
=== Initial investigations ===
The Federal Bureau of Investigation (FBI) reported that they became aware of group chats on social media in early 2020 threatening to conduct the violent overthrow of state governments and law enforcement. A U.S. Army veteran, Dan Chappel, had joined the group but became concerned about their use of a hunting app that could be used to track the addresses of police officers. He informed a friend and a local officer from an unidentified police department in Michigan, who then relayed the concerns to the FBI. During the initial investigation of social media chats, the FBI said that they encountered Barry Croft and Adam Fox. The FBI then interviewed Chappel, who agreed to become a confidential source after they raised concerns that there were plans to kill officers.

According to many of the plotters, as detailed in a report by BuzzFeed News, their first meetings were arranged by someone who turned out to be a longtime government informant from Wisconsin, who paid for hotel rooms and food as incentives. On March 30, Pete Musico, a co-founder of the Wolverine Watchmen, made a comment about placing Whitmer under citizen's arrest and numerous other statements on tape that prosecutors later said had indicated "a violent intent".

Intentions by the group to obtain Whitmer's address reportedly went as far back as April 19, according to court records. That same month, the Wolverine Watchmen built a fake house with PVC tubing, referred to as a "kill house", and Chappel showed them how to push inside the building and clear the rooms; according to Chappel, Musico would circle the fake house and pretend to wait for Whitmer so he could "catch that bitch as she came out the emergency exit." On April 30, all members of the group attended an armed protest at the Michigan State Capitol, which prosecutors said was the beginning of opportunities to conduct surveillance. Chappel reportedly heard "whispers" about storming the State Capitol during this time, but this did not happen when Michigan State Police officers stood down and granted the protesters access to the building.

On May 8, the FBI obtained a federal search warrant to review Croft's Facebook account. Agents found messages "plotting potential acts of violence", including a May 3 post referencing a male individual who "may be first" and was wanted "in custody"; the FBI claims this individual was South Carolina Governor Henry McMaster. The plot was reportedly hatched in an official capacity on June 6, among a group of about a dozen individuals meeting in Dublin, Ohio, a suburb located northwest of Columbus. A confidential source at the meeting reported that the group primarily sought to establish a new, self-reliant society that adhered to the U.S. Bill of Rights. Participants reportedly discussed peaceful and violent actions of achieving this goal, with talks shifting to how state governments were allegedly violating the U.S. Constitution, how "tyrants" should be killed, and that those present should return home to recruit neighbors.

The FBI subsequently began infiltrating the group online and in person with additional informants in June, according to a criminal complaint. A total of twelve informants were ultimately involved in the investigation, according to a federal court filing obtained by BuzzFeed News. Starting at that point, the FBI began compiling photographs, video footage, telephone calls, and encrypted messages made by the suspects and storing them as evidence on a USB flash drive. The content, said to consist of "hundreds of hours of undercover audio recordings and more than 13,000 pages of encrypted text messages", was released by the U.S. District Court for the Western District of Michigan on October 16.

=== Recruitment ===
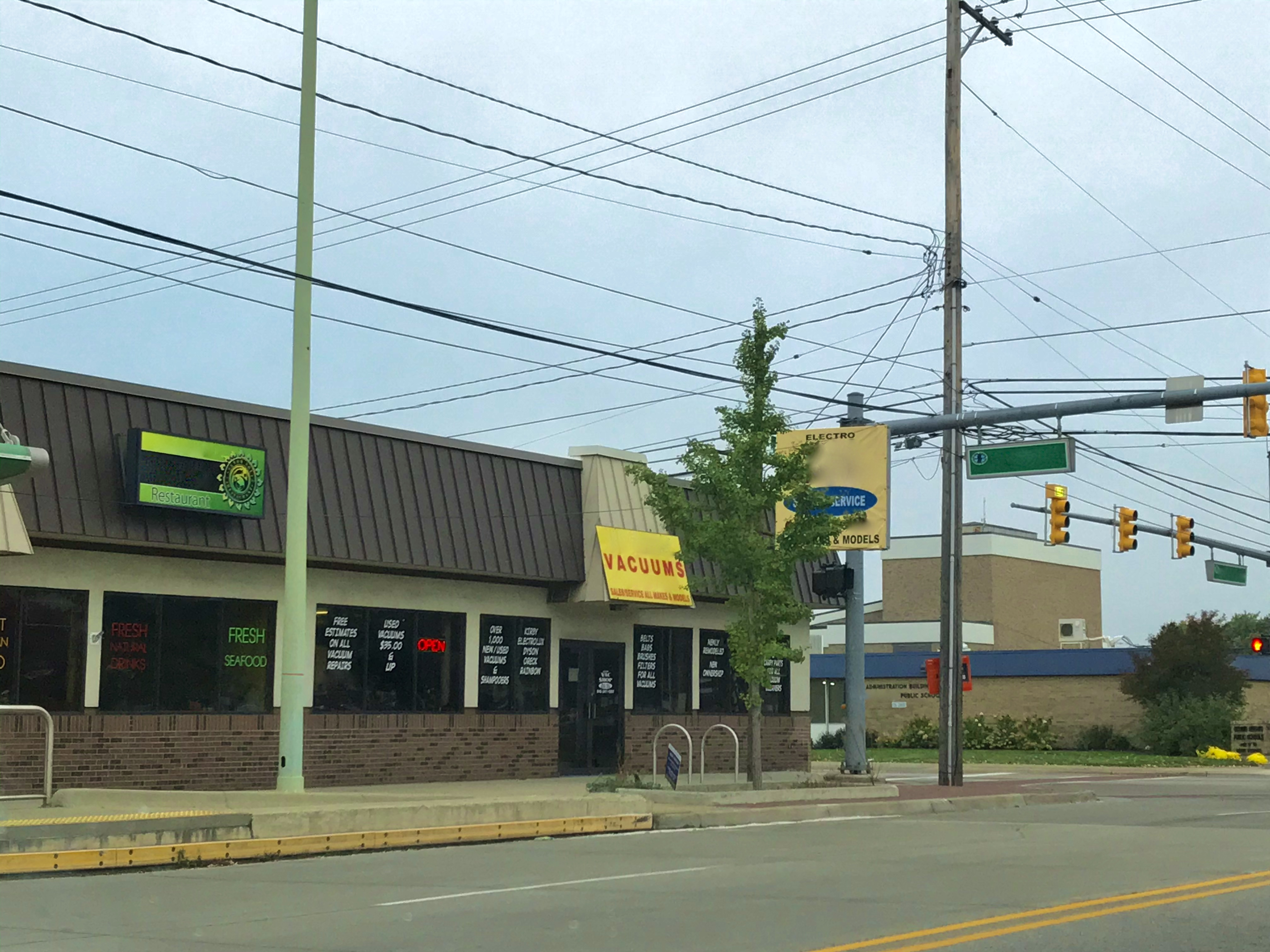
A building in Grand Rapids that was a meeting place for the plotters

After the Ohio meeting, Fox contacted the militia – already being investigated by the FBI – seeking assistance for the plot. On June 14, the militia held a field training exercise. That day, Fox contacted one confidential source in a recorded phone call, detailing the Ohio meeting, and he requested "200 men" to attack the State Capitol in order to take Whitmer and others as hostages and to hold a "trial" for the governor, accusing her of treason. During the call, Fox reportedly said to the source that the operation had to occur prior to the 2020 United States presidential election.

During a Second Amendment event at the State Capitol on June 18, Fox was recorded by a confidential source attempting to recruit militia group leaders to unite in an effort to attack the State Capitol. Two days later on June 20, Fox invited individuals, including one confidential source, to where he was employed in Grand Rapids. According to the source, Fox collected cellphones to prevent recordings and led participants through a trapdoor from the main floor, though the source wore a concealed recording device unknown to those gathered. Audio from the meeting provided to the FBI contained discussions of an assault on the Capitol, how to counterattack first responders, and the use of Molotov cocktails to destroy law enforcement vehicles. It was concluded that the group would meet on the first weekend of July, where they would discuss plans and perform training exercises.

In a June 25 Facebook video captured by the FBI, Fox held a livestream criticizing the justice system, the Government of Michigan and the state's order closing gyms, calling Whitmer a "tyrant bitch" and stating to viewers, "I don't know, boys, we gotta do something. You guys link with me on our other location system, give me some ideas of what we can do".

=== Training and planning ===
==== Initial assault plan ====
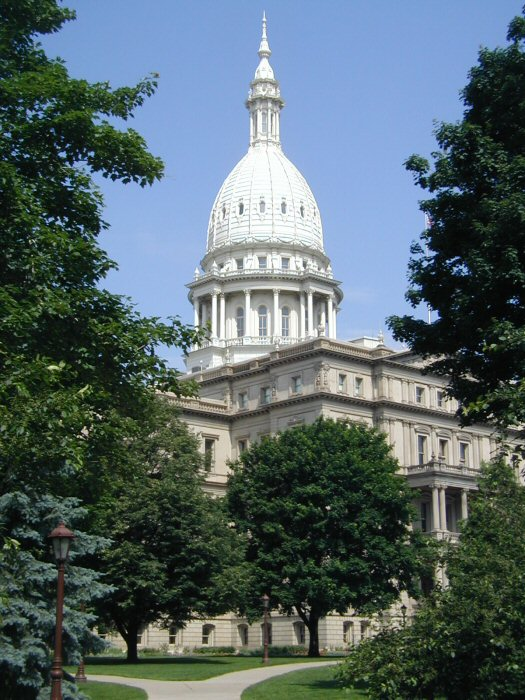
The Michigan State Capitol, where the group originally planned an assault

Training first occurred on June 28 in Munith, Michigan at a militia member's property, with Fox, his girlfriend, Ty Garbin, Kaleb Franks, Caserta, and a confidential source participating in the exercises. Participants were told to leave if they felt uncomfortable with attacking the government and participating in kidnapping. According to Musico's defense attorney, Fox started making comments about storming the State Capitol during this training session, but there was no agreement from the other members, and Musico expressed concern about the plan's tactical viability, saying, "It's a fishbowl." Court documents released on November 13 alleged that in addition to storming the State Capitol, there were plans of executing hostages and televising them over the course of a week, or locking people inside the building, while the Legislature was in session, and setting it on fire with the intention of leaving no survivors.

According to Musico's attorney, from that day to October 1, there was no activity from the Wolverine Watchmen due to a fight between Fox and Musico and Musico's eventual departure from the group. However, the FBI's confidential source for the investigation said that participants met for weapons exercises in Cambria, Wisconsin, between July 10 and 12, with Croft, Garbin, and a militia member attempting to make an improvised explosive device (IED) on July 11, though the device was defective. Franks also brought a rifle equipped with a suppressor, firing it at the time.

At a second meeting in Ohio held on July 18, audio collected by a confidential source revealed discussions of attacking a Michigan State Police station, though Garbin rejected plans of an assault on the Capitol building, instead suggesting to attack Whitmer's family vacation home on Birch Lake in Elk Rapids. In a July 14 call recorded by a source, Fox said he researched the governor's office, concluding that Whitmer would not be present there and was heard saying, "In all honesty right now ... I just wanna make the world glow, dude. I'm not even fuckin' kidding. I just wanna make it all glow dude. I don't fuckin' care anymore, I'm just so sick of it. That's what it's gonna take for us to take it back, we're just gonna have to everything's gonna have to be annihilated, man. We're gonna topple it all, dude. It's what great frickin' conquerors, man, we're just gonna conquer every fuckin' thing man." In a July 26 call with a confidential source, Fox said "Maybe we should just make a bunch of cupcakes and send them out", with the source interpreting this as Fox seeking to initiate a "widespread bombing campaign", according to the FBI.

==== Whitmer vacation home plans ====
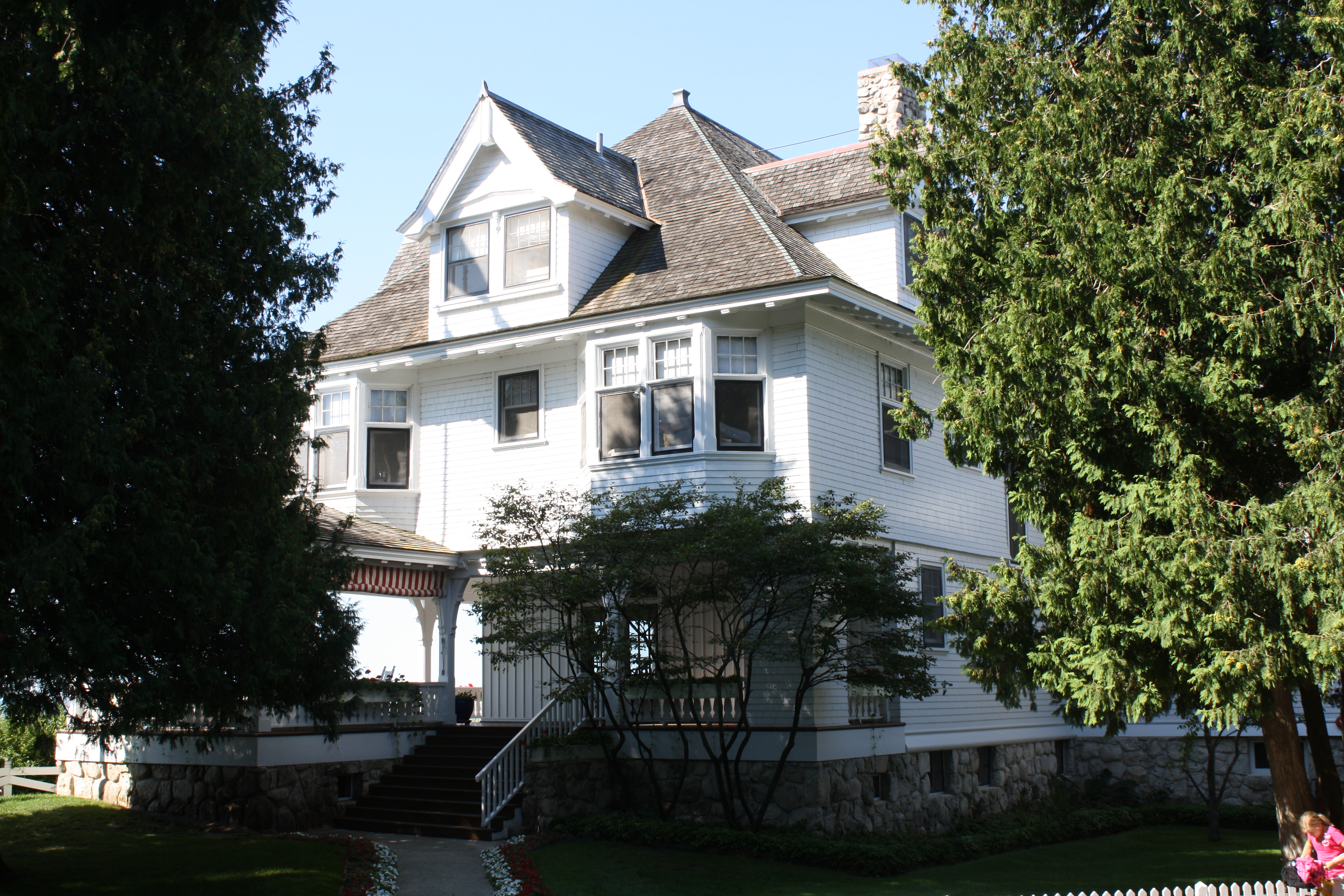
The Michigan Governor's Summer Residence on Mackinac Island, a site considered for the kidnapping

Fox invited participants to his Grand Rapids location on July 27, where a confidential source provided recordings of discussions that shifted to kidnapping Whitmer when she was arriving at, or leaving, either her personal vacation home or the Michigan Governor's Summer Residence on Mackinac Island. According to the FBI, in sourced audio, Fox could be heard saying, "Snatch and grab, man. Grab the fuckin' Governor. Just grab the bitch. Because at that point, we do that, dude -- it's over." Fox was also heard in the recording suggesting that the group hire a realtor to find Whitmer's exact residence, collecting information on the surrounding area and recruiting individuals skilled with information technology and demolitions.

Participants met in Munith a second time for training on August 9, and afterwards, they communicated via group calls and chats monitored by a confidential source. In these communications, Fox suggested researching the governor's residence in Lansing and destroying Whitmer's boat. Harris said in a chat, "Have one person go to her house. Knock on the door and when she answers it just cap her ... at this point. Fuck it. ... I mean ... fuck, catch her walking into the building and act like a passers-by and fixing [sic] dome her then yourself." During further chats on August 18, participants concentrated on finding the Whitmer family's vacation home and planned on how to escape the area by boat.

==== Surveillance begins ====
On August 23, participants met at Harris' home in Lake Orion, where a secret recording was captured of the group discussing surveillance of the vacation home and Franks shared that he spent nearly $4,000 on night vision goggles and a helmet. A source captured audio of an August 29 surveillance operation, where Fox drove by the Whitmer family's vacation home, took photographs, and discussed response times of police in the area. On the recorded audio, Fox was heard saying, "We ain't gonna let 'em burn our fuckin' state down. I don't give a fuck if there's only 20 or 30 of us, dude, we'll go out there and use deadly force." The next day on August 30, the FBI said screen captures of the group chat showed Garbin suggesting the demolition of a bridge over the Elk River, near the vacation home, to slow and distract police.

Due to recommendation of the Michigan State Police and the Michigan Department of Technology, Management and Budget, the construction of a $1.1 million barrier and electric fence at the Michigan Governor's Mansion in Lansing was announced on September 4 after weeks of construction, with spokeswoman Tiffany Brown saying "perimeter security and other safety upgrades" were being performed. Regarding the security upgrades, The Detroit News wrote "Whitmer, a Democrat who was first elected in 2018, has been the subject of menacing messages at Capitol demonstrations against her past COVID-19 stay-at-home orders", with the newspaper also citing other threats against Whitmer.

While driving in three vehicles–with an undercover FBI agent and confidential source present–from a group camp in Luther towards the vacation home on September 12 and early September 13, Croft suggested that the group attempt to kidnap Whitmer that night, though the idea was dismissed. According to the FBI, Croft and Fox, who were in the first vehicle, planned on detonating a bomb on a bridge of U.S. Route 31 in Elk Rapids, photographing the underside of the bridge, and deciding where to place explosives. The group in the first vehicle then drove to a boat launch across the lake from the vacation home, waiting for a second vehicle to conduct surveillance on the location. The third vehicle, which was also occupied by an undercover agent, was tasked with monitoring for any followers or suspicious activity in the area. On the way back to Garbin's property, the group discussed abandoning the kidnapping plan and instead destroying the vacation home entirely.

==== Plans finalize ====
At a discussion recorded at Garbin's property on September 13, Fox said the plan would strictly be a kidnapping, with the end result reportedly being either the abandonment of Whitmer on a boat in Lake Michigan or her being subjected to a trial as a "tyrant" in Wisconsin. When a plan to destroy the bridge leading to the lake in order to slow down responding security and police officers was raised, an undercover agent told Fox that the explosives necessary for destroying the bridge would cost about $4,000. The group decided that a final training exercise would be conducted later in October, though Fox pushed for an earlier date the following day. Fox ordered the explosives from the undercover agent that same day. Also on that day, Croft and Harris detonated an IED containing shrapnel near human silhouette targets to test its effectiveness. On October 2, Fox told a confidential source that he purchased an 800,000-volt taser to be used for the kidnapping. That same month, he reportedly contacted Musico, who advocated for a nonviolent approach. Fox, Garbin, Harris, and Franks planned to meet with an undercover FBI agent to purchase explosives on October 7, though Caserta did not attend due to work obligations, while Croft returned to Delaware prior to the meeting. The prosecution was hampered in that an abduction date was never determined and the plot's details varied among the witnesses.

=== Arrests ===
All of the members involved were arrested on the night of October 7, and charges were filed against them the next day. Search warrants and arrests were executed all across Michigan. The arrests were reportedly part of a planned effort between federal and state authorities, launched after evidence was discovered indicating the suspects wanted to kidnap Whitmer before the 2020 election. At least seven FBI field offices, along with the operational divisions at the J. Edgar Hoover Building in Washington, D.C., were reportedly involved in coordinating the arrests. A week later, a fourteenth suspect was arrested and charged in state court. The investigation also involved people from Baltimore to Kansas City. Several weapons and other items were seized, including at least 1,916 rounds of pistol, rifle, and shotgun ammunition; hundreds of firearms; extended magazines; various suppressors; speedloaders; and bomb-making equipment.

== Legal proceedings ==
=== Federal ===
Criminal complaint of the United States District Court for the Western District of Michigan regarding the incident

Six people (Adam Fox, Ty Garbin, Barry Croft, Kaleb Franks, Daniel Harris, and Brandon Caserta) were charged in the United States District Court for the Western District of Michigan for conspiring to commit kidnapping. The federal charges carry a potential sentence of life imprisonment if convictions are obtained. A federal judge said the federal government had probable cause in the cases against five of the defendants and declared they could move forward to trial, while also denying bond to four of them.

During a court hearing on October 13, an FBI agent testified that the conspirators had considered leaving Whitmer in a boat in the middle of Lake Michigan and disabling its motor. He also testified that the group had discussed, during early stages of the planning, kidnapping Virginia Governor Ralph Northam, who had also imposed strict lockdown orders in response to the COVID-19 pandemic. This prompted the FBI to notify members of Northam's security staff about the potential threat.

On October 26, federal prosecutors announced the FBI had found "explosive device components" and privately made firearms and are considering adding federal terrorism charges after they are analyzed by experts. On October 28, an unsealed search warrant revealed that some of the defendants had discussed South Carolina Governor Henry McMaster as another possible target during the early stages of planning in March. The warrant also revealed that, in late June, Croft had posted on Facebook a hit-list of politicians that he said he wanted to hang. The list included the names of McMaster, President Trump, former Presidents Barack Obama and Bill Clinton, former U.S. State Secretary Hillary Clinton, New York Representative Alexandria Ocasio-Cortez, other Democratic and Republican elected officials, liberals, Muslims, and "all anti-Americans".

On October 30, Franks' attorney requested a judge to reconsider her decision to keep him imprisoned, saying he is diabetic and fears contracting COVID-19 in jail. On December 16, all six federal defendants were indicted by a grand jury. On January 1, 2021, Croft, who remains jailed in a Philadelphia federal prison, asked to be released while he awaited his court hearings, due to the constant delays in a prisoner transfer and the subsequently slow progress of the case against him. Federal prosecutors argued against releasing him, describing Croft as a "violent extremist" and saying such a decision would be "unreasonable". On January 15, 2021, a judge ordered all six defendants to stand trial on March 23. The trial date was later postponed to October 12. Croft, Fox, Harris, Franks, and Caserta pleaded not guilty to the charges. On January 27, 2021, Garbin pleaded guilty to conspiring to commit kidnapping. His sentencing was scheduled for July 8. As part of a plea bargain, he agreed to testify against his co-defendants in exchange for no additional charges being filed against him by prosecutors. On August 26, 2021, Garbin was sentenced to six years in prison and fined $2,500.

On April 28, 2021, federal prosecutors charged Fox, Croft, and Harris with conspiracy to use weapons of mass destruction, in relation to the explosives that Fox ordered from the undercover agent on September 13, 2020. In December 2021, the five remaining defendants (Adam Fox, Barry Croft, Kaleb Franks, Daniel Harris, and Brandon Caserta) – who were then still in custody – filed a motion to have the charges against them dismissed on the grounds of entrapment. Robert Jonker, the Chief federal district court judge assigned to the case rejected the defense's motion to dismiss on January 26, 2022. Though Jonker is allowing the defense to argue entrapment to the jury, he stated, "at this pretrial stage, the Court concludes the defense has not demonstrated as a matter of law that Defendants' wills were overcome by the actions of the government." After Franks pleaded guilty in February, the trial of the remaining four defendants was scheduled to commence March 8, 2022. The trial was delayed by a participant's positive COVID-19 test, and the court was scheduled to re-convene on March 17, 2022.

On March 8, 2022, trial began for Fox, Croft, Harris and Caserta in the United States District Court with Judge Jonker presiding. On April 8, 2022, after five days of deliberation, Caserta was acquitted of the only charge he faced and Harris was found not guilty on all charges, while Fox and Croft received a hung jury. The judge declared a mistrial and ordered Fox and Croft remain in jail until re-trial. On August 10, 2022, the retrial of Fox and Croft began. On August 23, 2022, Fox and Croft were found guilty of kidnapping conspiracy and conspiracy to possess weapons of mass destruction at their retrial. Croft was also convicted of another explosives charge. On October 6, 2022, Franks was sentenced to four years in prison. On December 27, 2022, Fox was sentenced to serve sixteen years in federal prison followed by five years of supervision. On December 28, 2022, Croft was sentenced to serve more than nineteen years and seven months in federal prison.

=== State ===
Michigan Attorney General Dana Nessel charged seven other men (Pete Musico, Joseph Morrison, Shawn Fix, Eric Molitor, Michael Null, William Null, and Paul Bellar) with state crimes, including providing material support for terrorist acts, firearm crimes, and gang membership. Two of the defendants were each set a bond of $10 million, with preliminary examinations scheduled for October 21. Musico's bond was later reduced to $100,000 after his attorney convinced the judge his role in the plot was overstated. On October 20, Bellar was charged with state crimes and was extradited from his home state of South Carolina for a formal trial. On November 10, Fix was released on a $250,000 bond. Three days later, bond was reduced for Morrison, Musico, and Bellar. Bellar was released on a $75,000 bond on November 13.

On October 15, Brian Higgins from Wisconsin was charged by Nessel with material support of an act of terrorism, which carries a 20-year sentence. On October 19, Higgins was released on bail, with one of the imposed restrictions being that he not try to make contact with the other 13 defendants. On November 18, his attorney announced his client's plans to challenge his extradition from Wisconsin to Michigan. The basis of the challenge was that the extradition paperwork was signed by Whitmer, the target of the plot, thus creating a conflict of interest. On December 15, a judge in Columbia County, Wisconsin ruled there was enough probable cause for the transfer to occur. His extradition was delayed after his attorney filed an appeal on the ruling.

On December 4, twin brothers Michael and William Null were released on bond. On December 18, a Jackson County judge denied a bond reduction request for Morrison, saying he could still pose a threat to the public. On January 14, 2021, Molitor was released on bond. On March 29, 2021, Morrison, Musico, and Bellar were bound over for trial after a three-day-long preliminary hearing. At the same hearing, threat of terrorism charges were dismissed against Morrison and Musico; Bellar did not face that charge. On April 14, 2021, a judge lifted Michael and William Null's curfew and house arrest restrictions, but they were still required to wear GPS tethers.

On June 7, 2021, Musico called for his case to be dismissed, arguing entrapment by federal authorities and the confidential informant and claiming he would not have associated himself with Fox without police interference. He also claimed the informant led the training sessions for the Wolverine Watchmen; an FBI agent said in March that he instructed the informant to take on a leadership role during those sessions to prevent suspects from getting injured and thus requiring a law enforcement response while the Wolverine Watchmen were armed. Attorneys for Morrison and Bellar later similarly called for the case's dismissal due to entrapment. However, on March 1, 2022, a Jackson County judge denied the motion to dismiss.

On October 26, 2022, Bellar, Morrison, and Musico were convicted of materially aiding a terrorist and being a member of a gang as part of a plot to kidnap Gov. Whitmer. Bellar was sentenced to 20 years in prison with a minimum of seven to serve; Morrison to 20 years with a minimum of 10 to serve; and Musico to 20 years with a minimum of 12 to serve. The last five defendants (the Null brothers, Shawn Fix, Higgins and Molitor) were turned over for trial on December 7, 2022. Ahead of trial, Higgins pled guilty to attempting to provide material support for terrorist acts. On June 7, 2023, Fix also pled guilty. Molitor and the Nulls maintained their innocence; their trial began on August 23, 2023. All three men were acquitted.

On June 9, 2026, Morrison's conviction was overturned by the Michigan Court of Appeals. The ruling was made on technical grounds, with the court holding that kidnapping was not "an underlying violent felony" as defined by the state's terrorism laws and therefore could not support a conviction for terrorist offenses. Nessel vowed to appeal the verdict. On July 20, 2026, Musico and Bellar's convictions were also overturned.

== Reactions ==
=== Whitmer's response ===
Whitmer spoke out during a livestream held after the thwarted plot was revealed by the FBI. She thanked the law enforcement agencies involved in the investigation, called the plotters "sick and depraved men", and cast blame on President Trump for refusing to explicitly condemn far-right groups and for his handling of the COVID-19 pandemic. Whitmer later urged in a tweet that the suspects be called domestic terrorists and not members of any militia organization. In an October 11 interview with Face the Nation, she said security threats against her still existed and that extremists like the Wolverine Watchmen are "finding comfort and support in the rhetoric coming out of Republican leadership from the White House to our state House." Whitmer wrote about the plot in an opinion piece in The Atlantic on October 27, where she continued to blame Trump's rhetoric for causing divisiveness in the country.

=== Other political responses ===
Michigan Attorney General Dana Nessel called the plot "one of the largest cases in recent history" and labeled the case as "rather unprecedented" in nature. State Senator Mike Shirkey, Michigan House Speaker Lee Chatfield, and Ohio Governor Mike DeWine condemned the plot. Chatfield later criticized Whitmer for not warning state lawmakers in advance about the plotters' original intent to storm the Michigan State Capitol building. Delaware Governor John Carney, who pardoned one of the suspects in 2019, called the federal charges "disturbing" and said, "This is also another warning sign about the growing threat of violence and radicalization in our politics." Virginia Governor Ralph Northam, who had also been discussed by the plotters as a potential target, declined to comment about the details of the plot but said he and his family felt safe with the protection of the Virginia State Police.

==== President Trump's responses ====
In an October 8 interview, President Trump criticized Whitmer for her rebuke of him in response to the kidnapping plot, saying he condemned all forms of "extreme violence" and calling for her to reopen her state.

During that interview, Trump falsely claimed that Michigan's schools and churches were closed under Whitmer's orders. In response to Trump's remarks, Whitmer said it "tells you everything you need to know" about the difference between him and Democratic presidential candidate Joe Biden. Biden also reacted to Trump's remarks on October 16, saying the "failure to condemn these folks is stunning."

Trump continued to attack Whitmer for her COVID-19 mitigation measures at a rally in Muskegon on October 17, which was matched with chants of "Lock her up!", to which he replied, "Lock 'em all up." Trump's daughter-in-law Lara, a campaign surrogate, later insisted he was merely "having fun" at the rally. In a subsequent interview with NBC's Meet the Press, Whitmer called Trump's rhetoric "incredibly disturbing" and said it is "inspiring and incentivizing and inciting this kind of domestic terrorism". She also countered Trump's claims at the rally that she should relax the statewide COVID-19 restrictions, saying Michigan has not had a stay-at-home order since spring. At an October 27 rally in Lansing, Trump downplayed the domestic terror aspect of the plot and continued the verbal attacks on Whitmer, which were also met with chants of "Lock her up!".

=== Law enforcement responses ===
Since the kidnapping plot at one point involved an intended attack on police, state law enforcement agencies were put on high alert in response.

==== Statements by Barry County Sheriff ====
Dar Leaf, the elected sheriff of Barry County, Michigan, appeared to defend two of the suspects in an October 8, 2020 interview, saying that "a lot of people are angry with the governor, and they want her arrested. So are they trying to arrest or was it a kidnap attempt? Because you can still in Michigan if it's a felony, make a felony arrest." Citing the state's citizen's arrest statute, he continued, "It doesn't say if you are an elected office that you're exempt from that arrest. I have to look at it from that angle and I'm hoping that's more what it is, in fact, these guys are innocent till proven guilty so I'm not even sure if they had any part of it."

The interview went viral on the internet, along with the revelation that Leaf had shared the stage with one of the suspects at a May 18 anti-lockdown protest. Attorney General Nessel condemned the remarks as "dangerous", while a number of other Michigan sheriffs expressed their outrage as well. Law experts disagreed with the notion that the Wolverine Watchmen were simply planning to conduct a legal citizen's arrest on Whitmer, saying it was far-fetched. Leaf later clarified his comments, claiming he simply wanted a fair trial for the accused and did not agree with their actions, which he called "horrible". His earlier comments and his ties with one of the suspects during the anti-lockdown protest have spurred calls for him to resign. On October 13, Leaf acknowledged the criticism but said he would not resign.

=== Michigan State Capitol security concerns ===
Democrats in the Michigan Legislature renewed calls for a ban on guns in the State Capitol building in response to news of the plot, following an unsuccessful September proposal drafted in response to armed anti-lockdown protesters storming the building in April.

On December 14, the day that Michigan's electors to the Electoral College were set to meet at the capital, authorities closed the Michigan State Capitol to the public and shuttered state legislators' offices, after "credible threats of violence" were received. The building was left open only to those needed for the Electoral College. Earlier that day, State Representative Gary Eisen claimed there would be a "Hail Mary" effort regarding a plan to prevent electors from casting a vote. When asked if he can assure the public that it will be a safe day in Lansing, and that nobody would get hurt, Eisen replied, "No. I don't know. Because what we're doing today is uncharted." Shortly after the interview, Chatfield and Speaker-Elect Jason Wentworth released a statement disavowing any threat of violence or intimidation and announcing Eisen would be removed from his committee assignments for the rest of the term.

On January 11, 2021, Michigan banned the open carry of firearms on the State Capitol, citing the kidnapping plot and the storming of the United States Capitol. The ban was supported by both Democratic and Republican state lawmakers. On January 15, 2021, the Michigan National Guard was requested, and heavy fencing was put up around the State Capitol, in preparation for an armed protest two days later, on January 17.

=== Other responses ===
A spokesperson for Facebook, which had been used by the suspects in plotting Whitmer's kidnapping, said the company would be cooperating with the FBI's investigation. A scheduled October 13 campaign stop by Eric Trump at a Lyon Township gun store was moved to a banquet center in Novi after it was discovered one of the suspects had worked there for three weeks before being fired. Some users on social media falsely asserted that the Wolverine Watchmen were anarchists affiliated with the antifa and Black Lives Matter movements. Some posts promoting these theories were flagged by Facebook as part of its anti-misinformation campaign, while PolitiFact rated the posts as "Mostly False", noting that only one of the suspects, Daniel Harris, is known to have attended a BLM protest.

== See also ==
- 2020 boogaloo murders – political attacks in California by suspects with a similar affiliation
- Michael Kretschmer – Premier of Saxony, target of COVID-related assassination plot
- October Crisis – political kidnapping and subsequent crisis in Quebec in 1970
- Stochastic terrorism
