= 2020 Michigan State Capitol storming =

2020 attempt to stop COVID-19 regulations in Michigan, U.S.

April 30 storming of the Michigan State Capitol
- "American Patriot Rally"; Part of domestic terrorism in the United States and COVID-19 protests in the United States
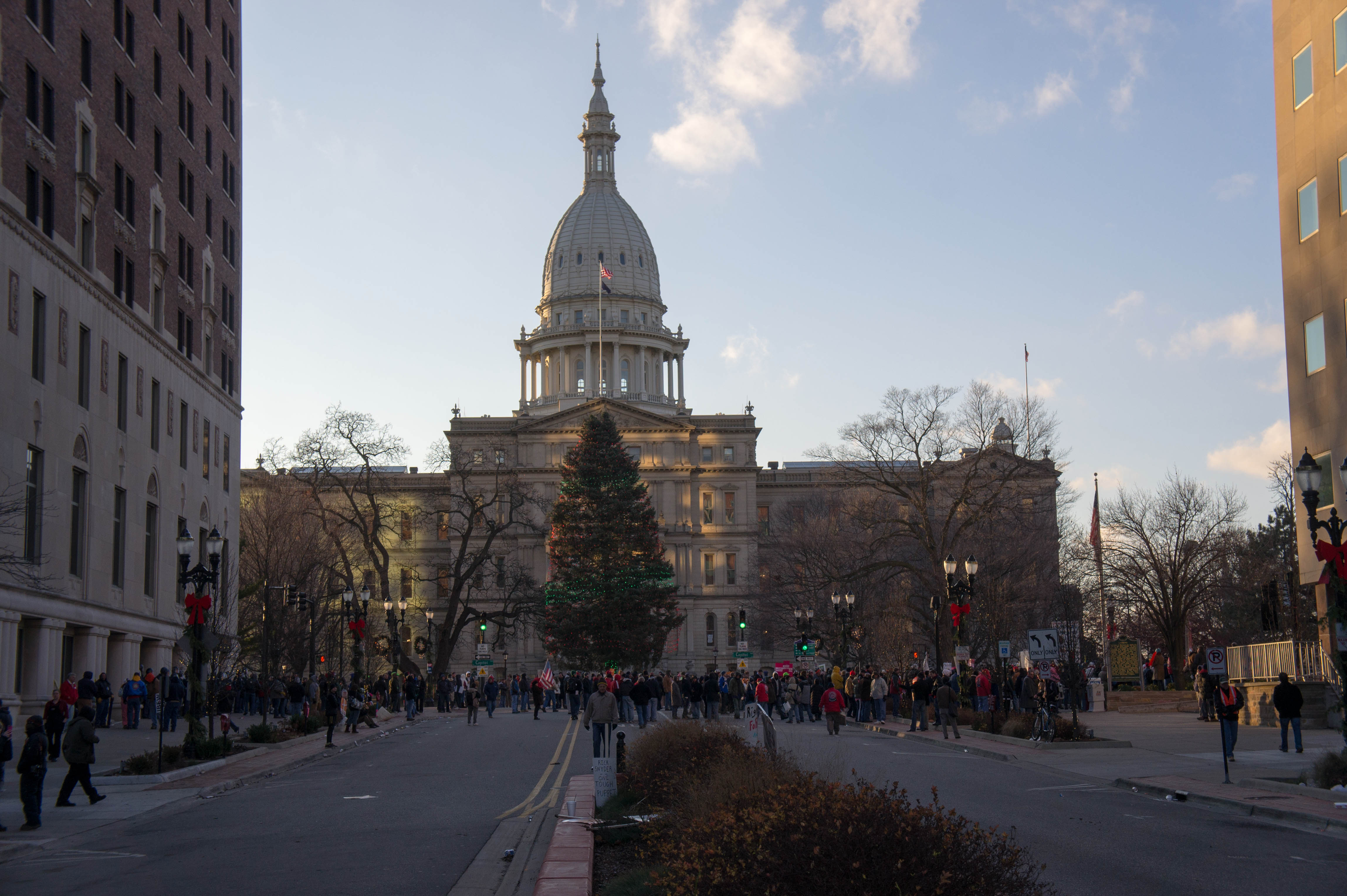
- Date: April 30, 2020 (GMT-4)
- Location: Michigan State Capitol, Lansing; 42.7336° N, -84.5554° W
- Caused by: Government-imposed lockdown
- Goals: End of stay-at-home order in the State of Michigan
- Methods: Far-right terrorism; Civil disorder; Political subversion
- Result: Attack unsuccessful: Further protests on May 28; Extension of stay-at-home orders; Extension of state of emergency

Parties
Right-wing and far-right protesters: Michigan Liberty Militia	State Government of Michigan: Michigan State Police; Lansing Police Department

Lead figures
Michigan United for Liberty; Michigan Conservative Coalition	Governor Gretchen Whitmer

Number
Est. 800-1,000 protesters	Unknown

Casualties
- Arrested: 1

On April 30, 2020, right-wing protesters stormed the Michigan State Capitol in Lansing as part of larger nationwide protests against COVID-19 restrictions.

== Background ==
On March 23, 2020, the first lockdown and stay-at-home orders were placed by the Democratic governor Gretchen Whitmer, in an attempt to curb the COVID-19 pandemic in the State of Michigan. The first confirmed cases were reported on March 10. By late March, there had been over 7,000 confirmed cases and around 300 deaths due to the virus.

Supporters of then-President Donald Trump were commonly found to believe in misinformation related to COVID-19, QAnon, the Jewish Deep State, and other right-wing conspiracy theories.

=== April 15 demonstration ===
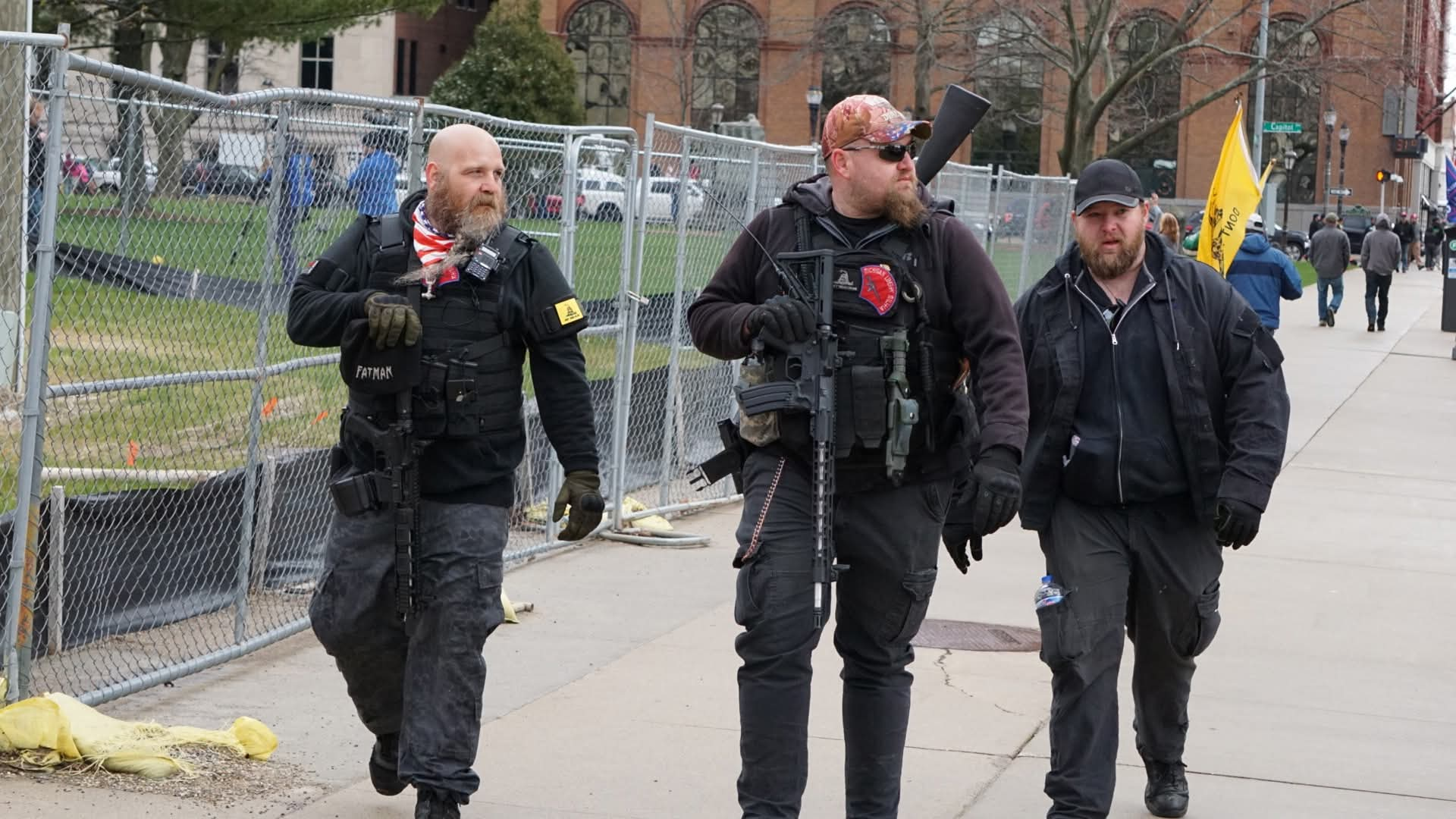
Members of the Michigan Liberty Militia carry long guns in Operation Gridlock protest. Lansing, MI. April 15th, 2020.

On April 15, thousands of protesters gathered outside the capitol to protest the regulations. The rally was dubbed "Operation Gridlock," as it stopped the city's roadways for nearly eight hours. The protesters called for the reopening of small businesses so "people could get back to work." Organizers with the Michigan Conservative Coalition told protesters to remain in their cars, but some instead chose to rally outside the steps of the State Capitol. Some wore masks, but most refused to remain 6 feet apart, as per COVID regulations. Members of the Michigan Liberty Militia walked up and down the sidewalk carrying rifles to "make sure everybody [had] the right to assemble peacefully."

Governor Whitmer told the protesters that another rally would "come at cost to people's health." She said that she respected their right to protest, but questioned their lack of regard for COVID-19 regulations.

== Demonstration ==
=== Protest ===
Fewer people attended the protest compared to the one on April 15, but this time many of them did not remain in their vehicles. A majority of the protesters also were not wearing masks, and more were carrying firearms. The crowd was filled with American flags and protest signs. Many protesters donned red "Make America Great Again" hats popularized by President Trump.

Inside the Capitol, legislators were passing bills and other works of legislation. The Republican-controlled legislature repeatedly refused Governor Whitmer's request to extend the emergency orders designed to prevent the spread of COVID-19.

=== Storming of Capitol ===
The gun-carrying protesters brandishing American flags began making their way off the grounds and towards the Capitol building. The crowd was filled with chants of "let us in," with one protester complaining that "this is the people's house, you cannot lock us out."

It is legal in Michigan to carry firearms inside the statehouse, and several armed demonstrators made their way inside. Their temperatures were checked by police before allowing them through security. The protesters demanded entry into the floor of the Senate chamber, but were stopped by members of the Michigan State Police.

A group of protesters in camouflage clothing, carrying semi-automatic rifles, made their way to the gallery above the Senate chamber. They watched as members of the legislature did their work and gave angry speeches about those looking down on them. They yelled and attempted to harass the legislators.

The House of Representatives allowed Speaker Lee Chatfield to file suit against Whitmer over her use of emergency powers. The Senate was also scheduled to vote on a similar measure, but that vote did not occur.

All of the protestors had left the Capitol by 5 PM. There were no reported injuries or deaths. However, the Michigan State Police said that there was one arrest involving a "highly intoxicated person" who attempted to rip a flag out of someone else's hands.

== Aftermath ==
Governor Whitmer signed an executive order to extend both the stay-at-home orders and the state of emergency through May 28.

=== Reactions ===
President Donald Trump tweeted his apparent support for the protestors, saying:

This is the scene on the Michigan Capitol lawn right now where protesters affiliated with a myriad of groups are staging a protest partly against the stay at home order, partly against Governor Whitmer on the day her emergency declaration is set to expire. 200-300 ppl our here.

Earlier, he had made another tweet:

LIBERATE MICHIGAN

The Michigan Senate Majority Leader, Mike Shirkey, condemned the protestors, calling them “a bunch of jackasses” who “used intimidation and the threat of physical harm to stir up fear and feed rancor.”

=== Plot to kidnap Governor Whitmer ===
Four attendees of the rally were later accused charged with various crimes in connection to a plot to kidnap Governor Whitmer and bomb the Capitol. Brothers William and Michael Null were part of a group called the Wolverine Watchmen, aiding in physical surveillance of Whitmer's personal vacation home. The men were reported to have been training and preparing for the kidnapping for several months before they were caught.

=== May 28 demonstration ===
More protesters, some armed, gathered at the Capitol again on May 28. One of the organizing groups, Michigan United for Liberty, called the day "judgement day," a familiar theme in alt-right and neo-Nazi rhetoric. Ahead of the protest, comments were made on Facebook threatening violence upon Whitmer and other legislators.

=== June 3 demonstration ===
A black organization, Legally Armed in Detroit, attended a rally on June 3 in protest of brutality around the February shooting of Ahmaud Arbery and the murder of George Floyd on Memorial Day. Most of the attendees from Legally Armed were openly carrying firearms. The organizers claimed the event wasn't in response to the previous demonstrations, but rather simply in support of their rights.

=== January 6 riot ===
The April 30 event was called a dress rehearsal for the January 6 attack on the United States Capitol. Several people, including Michigan state senator Erika Geiss, said that the event filled her with the same dread as the one on April 30. She said that “it was the same energy that was present at the Capitol in Michigan. It was just palpable coming through the television screen.”

Another Michigan state senator, Sylvia Santana, was stunned but not surprised by the riots. She said that “Michigan was the precursor for what happened,” on January 6. She wore a bulletproof vest during the April 30 incident, and she said that she wore the same one on January 6.
