= COVID-19 protests in the United States =

Rallies against restrictions due to the COVID-19 pandemic

- Part of the COVID-19 pandemic and COVID-19 misinformation and COVID-19 misinformation by governments and COVID-19 protests
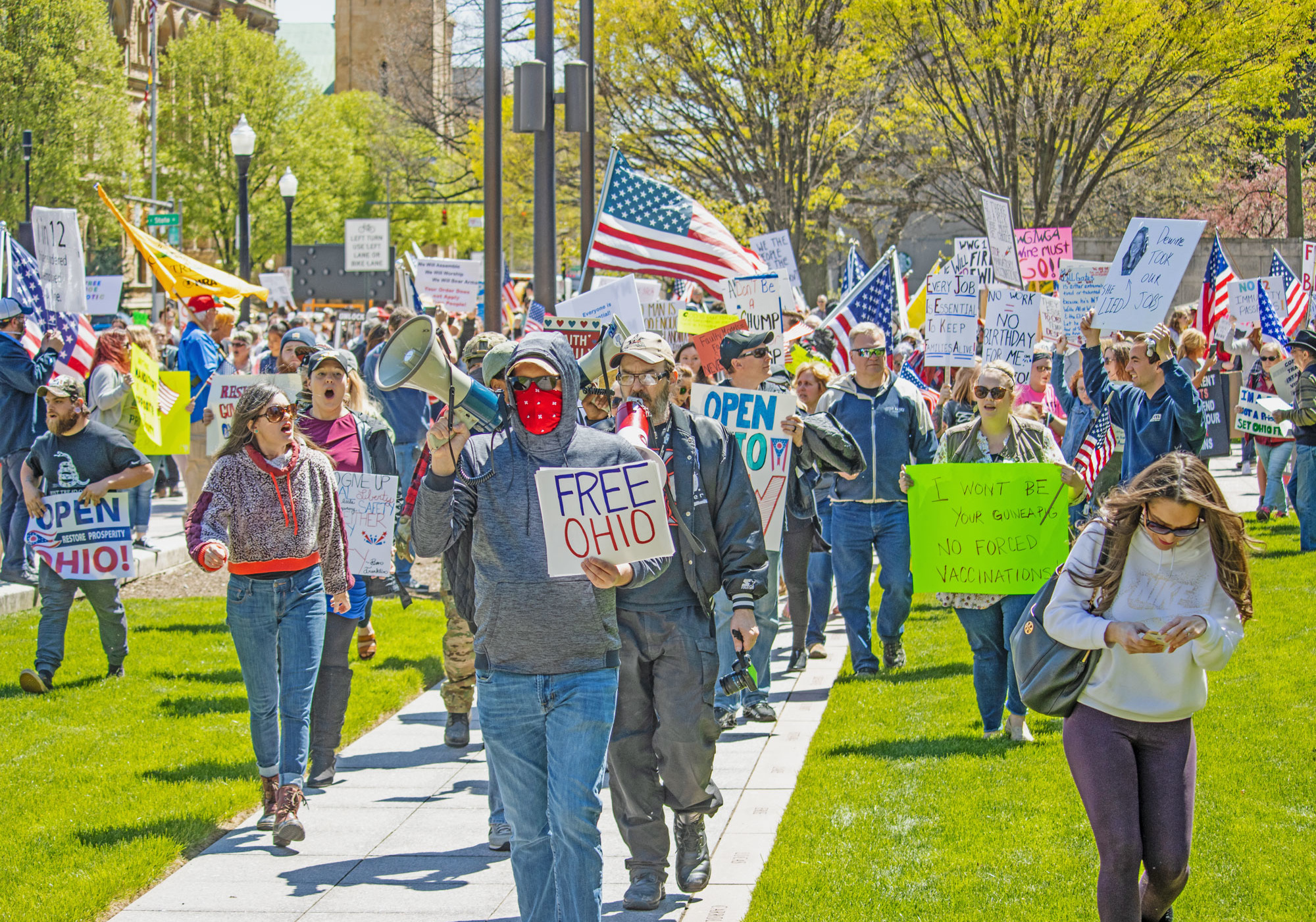
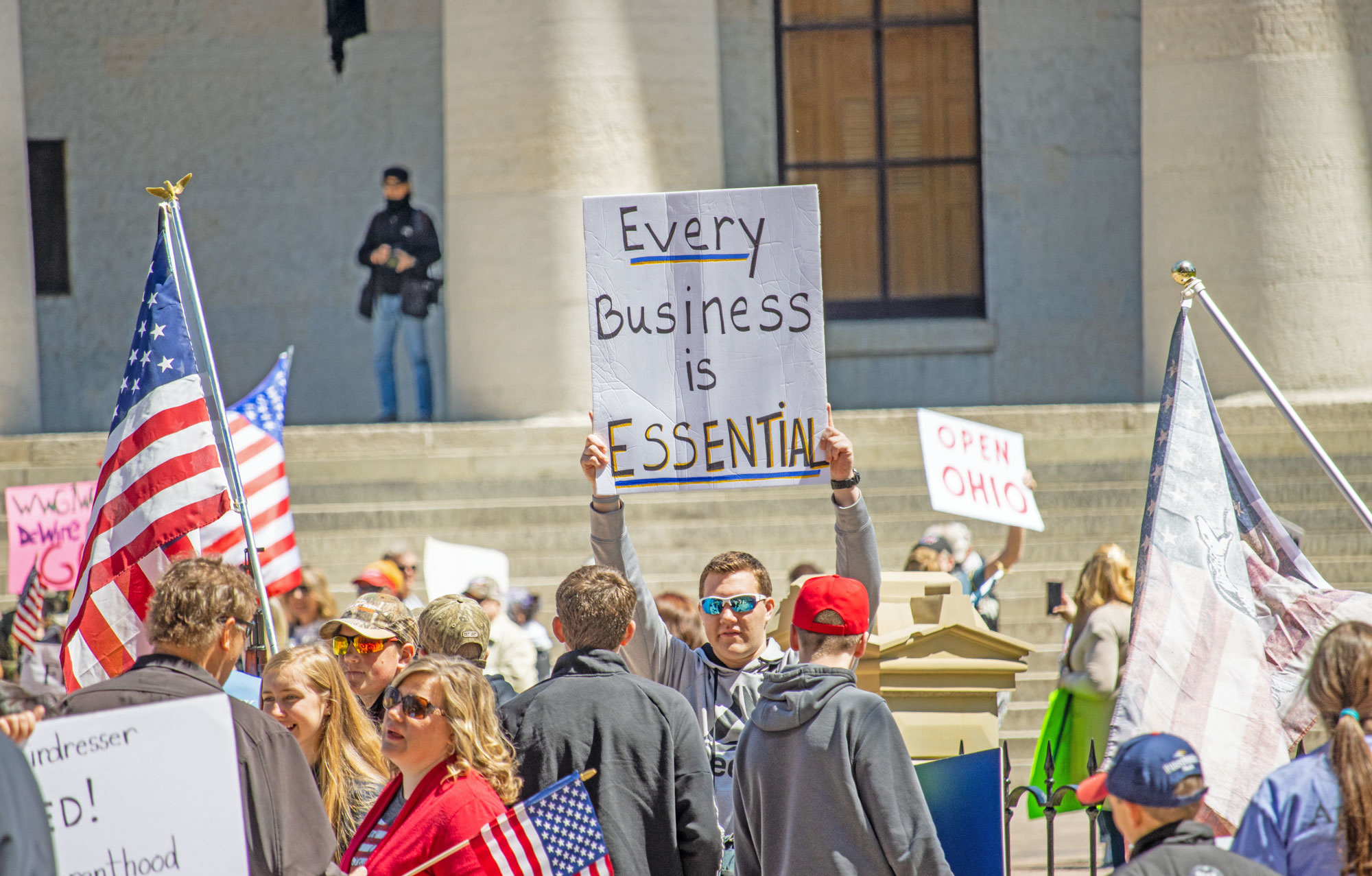
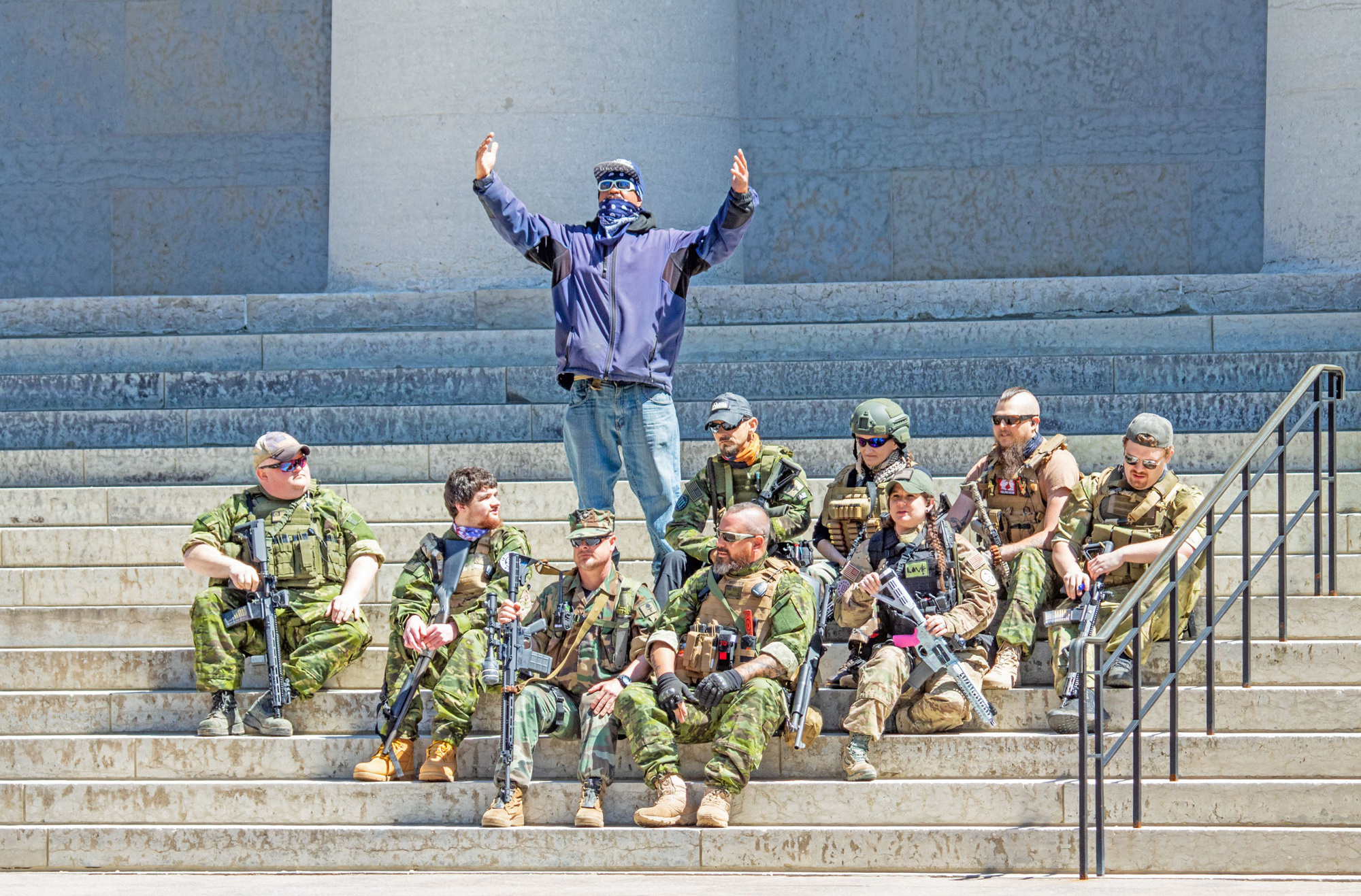
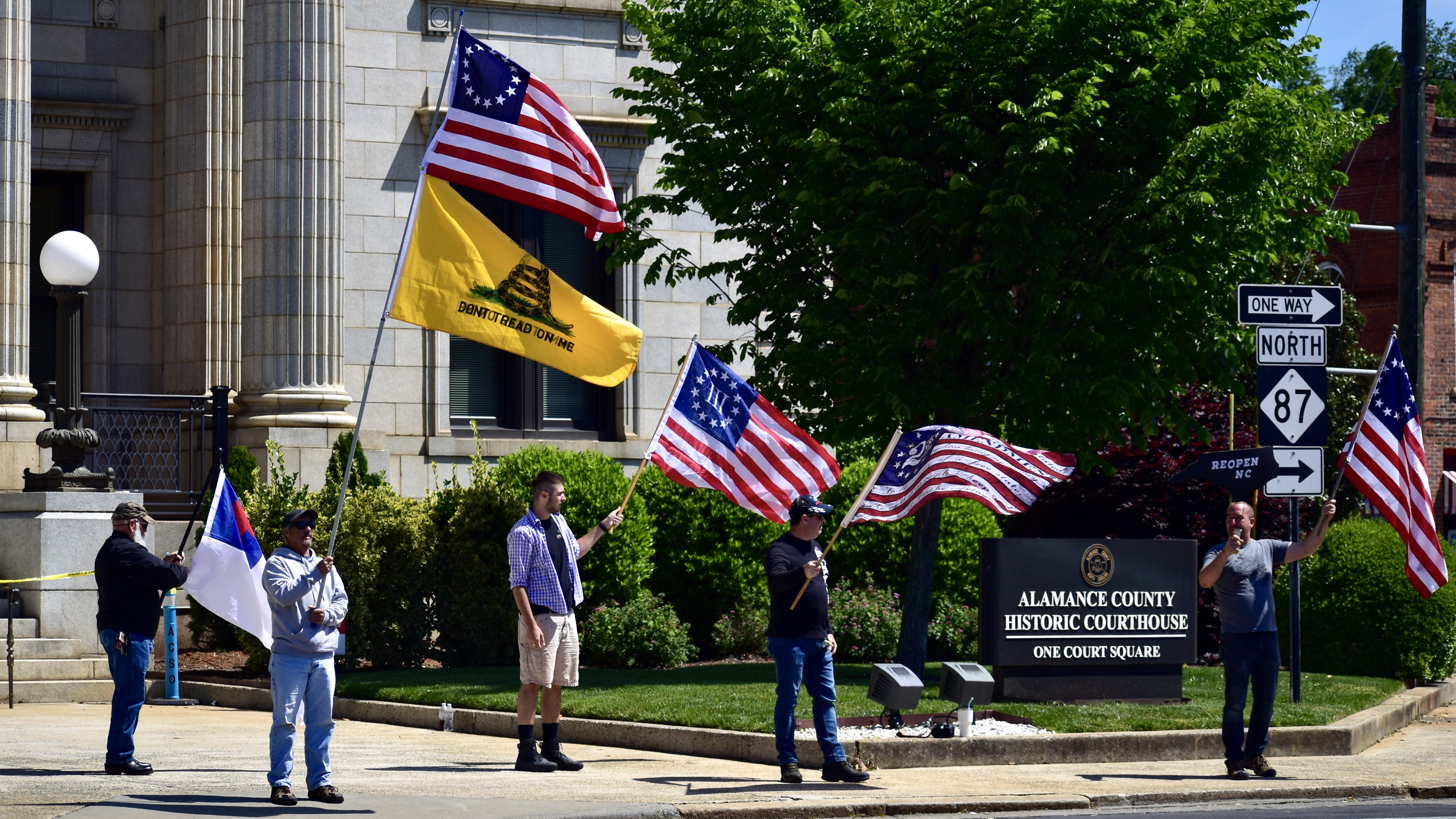
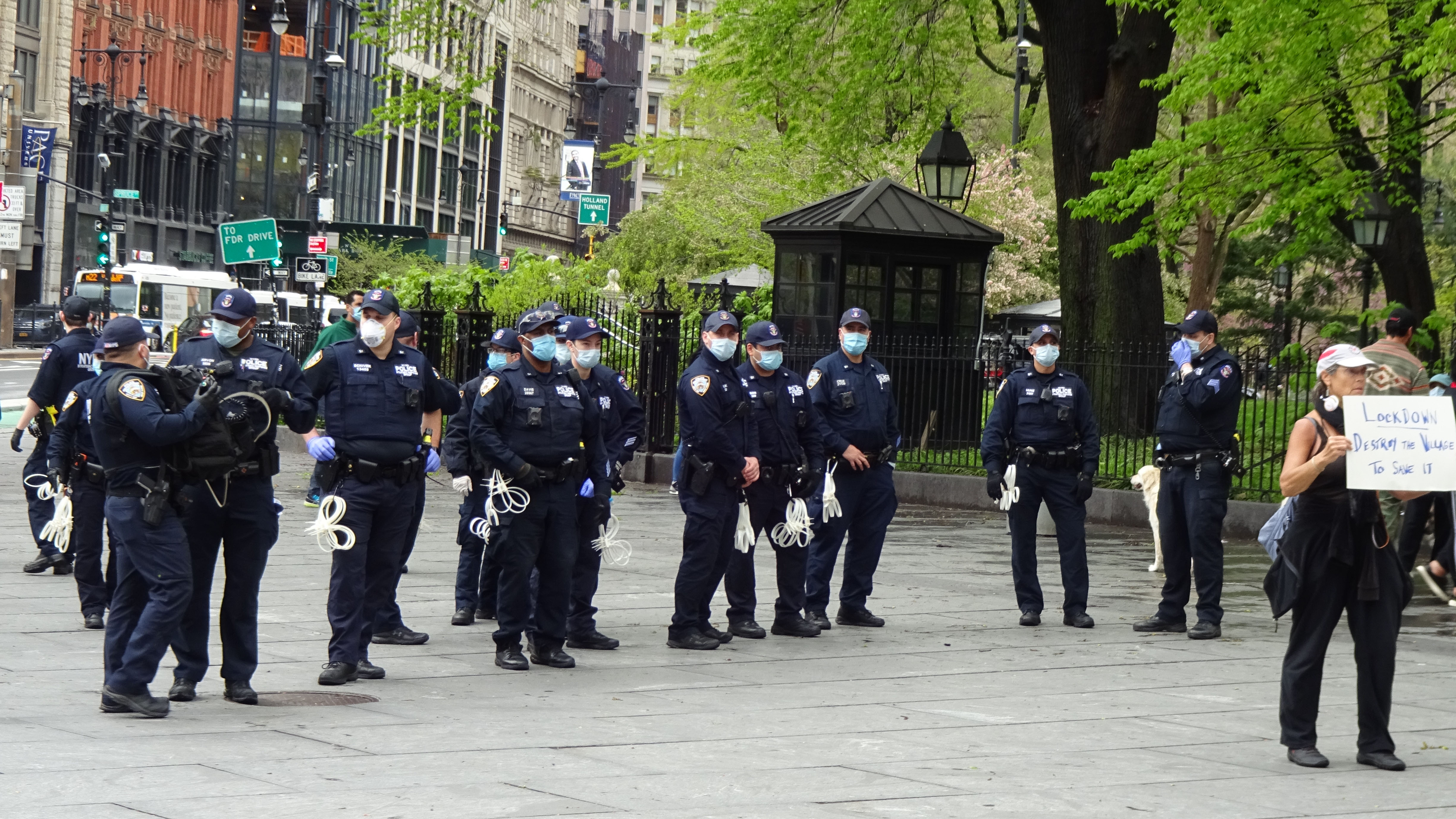
- Montage of anti-lockdown protests
- Date: April 15, 2020 – December 25, 2021 (1 year, 8 months, 1 week and 4 days)
- Location: United States
- Caused by: Government-imposed lockdowns
- Methods: Protests, demonstrations
- Status: Concluded

Parties
Several (mostly Democratic) state governments Law enforcement in the United States; Political Support: Federal government of the United States (under Biden, from Jan 2021) (United Nations) WHO	Anti-vax protesters Qanon/COVID-19 conspiracy theorists Far-right movements Political Support: Federal government of the United States (under Trump, until Jan 2021) Several (mostly Republican) state governments

Lead figures
(United States) Joe Biden (United States) Anthony Fauci (United Nations) Tedros Adhanom Ghebreyesus	(United States) Donald Trump

Beginning in early April 2020, there were protests in several U.S. states against government-imposed lockdowns in response to the COVID-19 pandemic in the United States. The protests, mostly organized by conservative groups and individuals, decried the economic and social impact of stay-at-home orders, business closures, and restricted personal movement and association, and demanded that their respective states be "re-opened" for normal business and personal activity.

The protests made international news and were widely condemned as unsafe and ill-advised, although some political figures expressed support for the protests. They ranged in size from a few hundred people to a few thousand, and spread on social media with encouragement from U.S. President Donald Trump.

By May 1, 2020, there had been demonstrations in more than half of the states; many governors began to take steps to lift the restrictions as daily new infections began decreasing due to social distancing measures.

== Background ==
The anti-lockdown protests were first spawned with a nationwide call in mid-March by an online Facebook page by the name of "American Revolution 2.0" and a meme that went viral. The page quickly grew to over 100,000 users in less than a week and then was removed from Facebook for violations of terms of service. The group then set up 53 Facebook groups named "AR2" to run protests at the capitol of every state (as well as Los Angeles and Chicago). This page and the many groups were led by Naperville, Illinois native Josh Ellis. On April 30, 2020, at 11:00 p.m. CST all 53 groups were deleted simultaneously from Facebook for violating terms and conditions. Due to the widespread notoriety and media coverage of the May 1 planned protest, many other groups started smaller protests prior to the date.

One of the first protests to take place was in Michigan on April 15, 2020. It was organized via a Facebook group called "Operation Gridlock", which was created by the Michigan Conservative Coalition. A spokesman for the Michigan Conservative Coalition encouraged groups in other states to copy the Operation Gridlock wording and templates. Protesters in numerous other states said they were inspired by Michigan, and they used Michigan's material on their own websites, Facebook groups, and Reddit pages to promote their protests. Michigan Governor Gretchen Whitmer falsely claimed that the Michigan Freedom Fund was a party to this event and that it was funded in part by the DeVos family, but a spokesman said the family had nothing to do with the protests.

The Trump campaign declined to answer whether it was directly involved with organizing the protest in Michigan, but key protest organizers who did identify themselves were Meshawn Maddock, the wife of Republican state representative Matt Maddock and a member of the national advisory board for Women for Trump, and Marian Sheridan, who serves as a vice chair on the Michigan Republican Party, both founding members of Michigan Conservative Coalition. The protest in Washington State was organized by a county Republican Party, and speakers included three Republican state legislators. FreedomWorks, a conservative advocacy group associated with the Tea Party movement, published a "#ReOpenAmerica Planning Guide".

Protesters opposed the shelter-in-place orders in their states for various reasons. Many said they wanted businesses reopened so they could go back to work. Many others displayed pro-Trump banners, signs, and MAGA hats. Still others insisted the lockdowns were a violation of their constitutional rights. One militia leader told a reporter, "Re-open my state or we will re-open it ourselves." The anger driving the protests was called "both real and manufactured", with conservative groups engaging in astroturfing via centralized organization backed by anonymous donors.

The reopen protests were generally small, with protester numbers ranging from a few dozen to the low hundreds; the first protest in Michigan drew twenty thousand protestors, as estimated by the state police. Protesters included mainstream Republicans, but also far-right groups including Proud Boys and armed militia movement supporters. A large number of "anti-vax" advocates have attended, and some have been the organizers of local protests. Ben, Chris and Aaron Dorr, three guns-rights activist brothers, are the organizers of protests in several Midwestern states.

Historians have noted that the protests are similar to those who grew tired of restrictions from the 1918 pandemic.

The ReAwaken America Tour began in the spring of 2021 as Health and Freedom rallies to protest COVID-19 restrictions. The events would later be renamed and sponsored by Charismatic Christian magazine Charisma News and expand to include themes of COVID-19 misinformation, QAnon, election denialism, and spiritual warfare. As of 2024, dozens of events have been held around the country.

After the murder of George Floyd on May 25, many of the Facebook groups created to organize protests over COVID-19 expanded their focus to attack the protests organized by Black Lives Matter.

== By state ==
=== Midwest ===
==== Illinois ====
On May 1, thousands of anti-lockdown protesters displaying the Confederate Flag, a sign written in German that read "work will set you free", Nazi symbols and signs with slogans like "Give me liberty or give me COVID-19" gathered for a Re-open Illinois rally in Springfield organized by American Revolution 2.0. Protesters and counter-protesters met in Chicago and Springfield where two arrests were made for disorderly conduct.

==== Indiana ====
Approximately 250 people gathered in front of the Governor's Mansion in Indianapolis on April 18, 2020, to protest Governor Eric Holcomb's stay-at-home order. The protesters did not follow social distancing guidelines, although some wore face masks. The protesters called for the governor to appear and explain himself, and said they were willing to be arrested if necessary.

==== Michigan ====
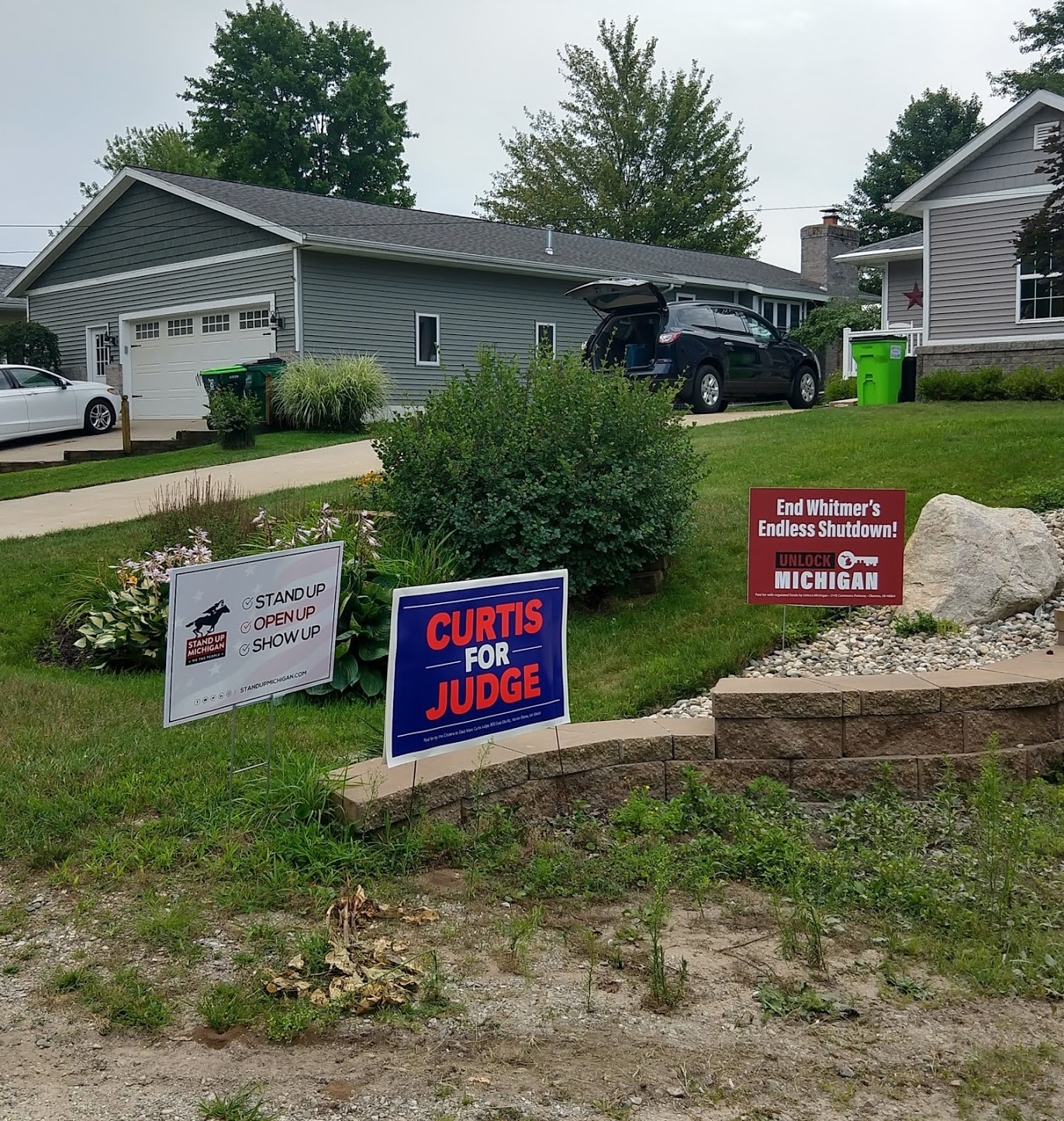
Yard signs for anti-lockdown organization Stand Up Michigan and its petition drive, Unlock Michigan, in Twin Lake, Michigan, on August 1, 2020

Michigan was the site of the largest of the "re-open" protests. The first confirmed case of coronavirus was recognized in Michigan on March 10, 2020. On April 15, the day of the protest, Michigan had at least 28,059 confirmed cases—the third highest number of cases in the United States—and 1,921 deaths had been attributed to the disease in the state. Metropolitan Detroit had been pronounced a "hot spot". Initial state actions to limit spread of the virus included closure of all K-12 schools, closure of bars, restaurants, and entertainment venues, and a ban on gatherings of more than 50 people. On March 24 a statewide stay-at-home order was issued which limited non-essential travel and ordered all non-essential business services and operations to close. The order was extended in early April with additional restrictions included.

On April 15, 2020, as estimated by the state police, 20,000 people took part in a protest they called Operation Gridlock in the area surrounding the Michigan State Capitol in Lansing. Most protestors remained in their vehicles, jamming the streets around the capitol building, although around 150 protested on the capitol lawn. The protest lasted eight hours. The protest caused delays during a shift change at Sparrow Hospital. Police described the protesters as respectful, with most trying to maintain social distancing; no arrests were made.

Protesters complained of loss of work and other economic hardship caused by the state government's coronavirus response. Some felt that if they were not sick, that they should have the freedom to continue with their normal routine. Others claimed violation of their civil liberties or expressed opposition to Governor Gretchen Whitmer's administration. Some protesters lived in more rural areas of Michigan that had not seen as many coronavirus cases as the cities of Detroit or Flint.

On April 30, a second protest organized as part of the American Revolution 2.0 national protest occurred when hundreds of protesters, many carrying firearms, gathered at the Michigan Capitol. Many protesters were able to enter the building. The demonstration had assistance organizing locally by the conservative group American Patriot Council. The protest was much smaller than the one on April 15, but the show of firearms and the violent tone of some of the signs indicated that things were changing. Some protesters compared the Governor to Adolf Hitler while children danced in masks of Donald Trump and Barack Obama on the steps of the Capitol. Governor Whitmer extended the state of emergency regardless.

On May 14, more armed protesters, organized by the group Michigan United for Liberty, gathered outside the Michigan State Capitol. The organization's Facebook group was deleted over death threats against Governor Whitmer and a fight broke out over a doll tied to a noose at the protest. The Michigan Legislature closed its scheduled session to avoid the possibility of another armed confrontation inside the chamber.

On May 20, seven hairdressers were ticketed for cutting hair on the steps of the Michigan State Capitol, for allegedly violating their licenses. The charges were later dropped.

A peaceful demonstration of prayers organized by the religious non-profit Transformation Michigan was performed on the Capitol lawn on May 28.

==== Minnesota ====
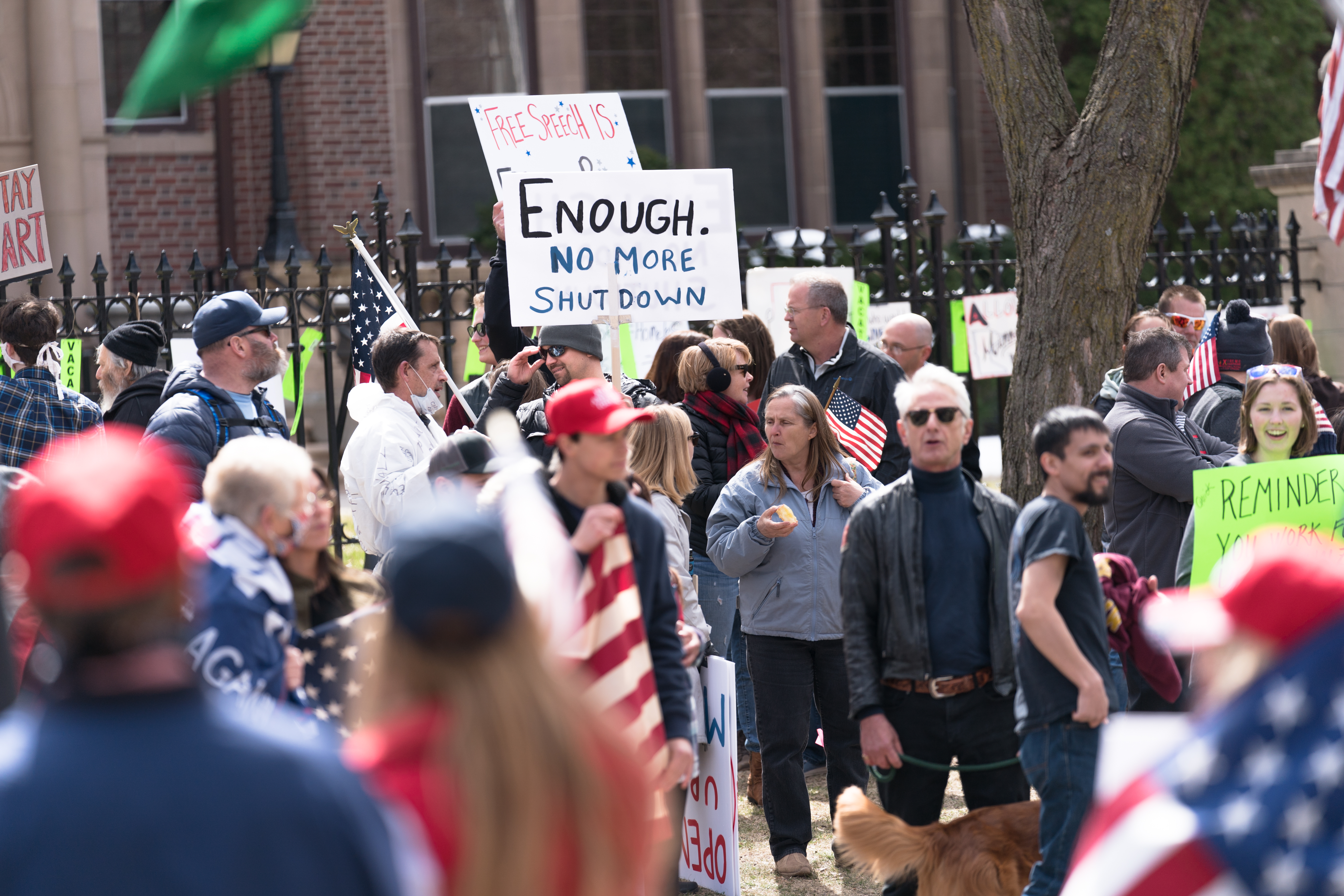
About 800 protesters gathered outside the Minnesota Governor's Residence for the "Liberate Minnesota" rally on April 17.

On April 17, about 800 protesters gathered outside the Governor's Mansion in St. Paul for a Liberate Minnesota protest encouraged by President Trump's tweets.

On April 19, Sven Sundgaard, a meteorologist at NBC affiliate KARE11, reposted a quote from a Rabbi Michael Latz accusing the right-wing protesters of being "white nationalist Nazi sympathizer gun fetishist miscreants" on his personal Facebook page. Sundgaard was subsequently fired for "ethics violations".

On May 11, a few dozen people gathered outside Albert Lea City Hall for a "prayer protest" in response to the pandemic lockdown.

On May 23, more than 200 attended what was supposed to be the reopening of a tavern in Albany. After attorneys obtained an injunction to prevent the reopening, the crowd became a protest. Attendees harassed a reporter for wearing a mask and intentionally coughed in public while not wearing masks.

On June 25, a couple wore Nazi flags in lieu of masks on their faces while shopping at a grocery store in Marshall.

==== North Dakota ====
Even though Governor Doug Burgum did not issue a stay-at-home order, about 150 protesters gathered outside the North Dakota State Capitol in Bismarck to demand the state government reopen concert venues, movie theaters, gyms, nail salons, massage parlors and barber shops.

==== Ohio ====
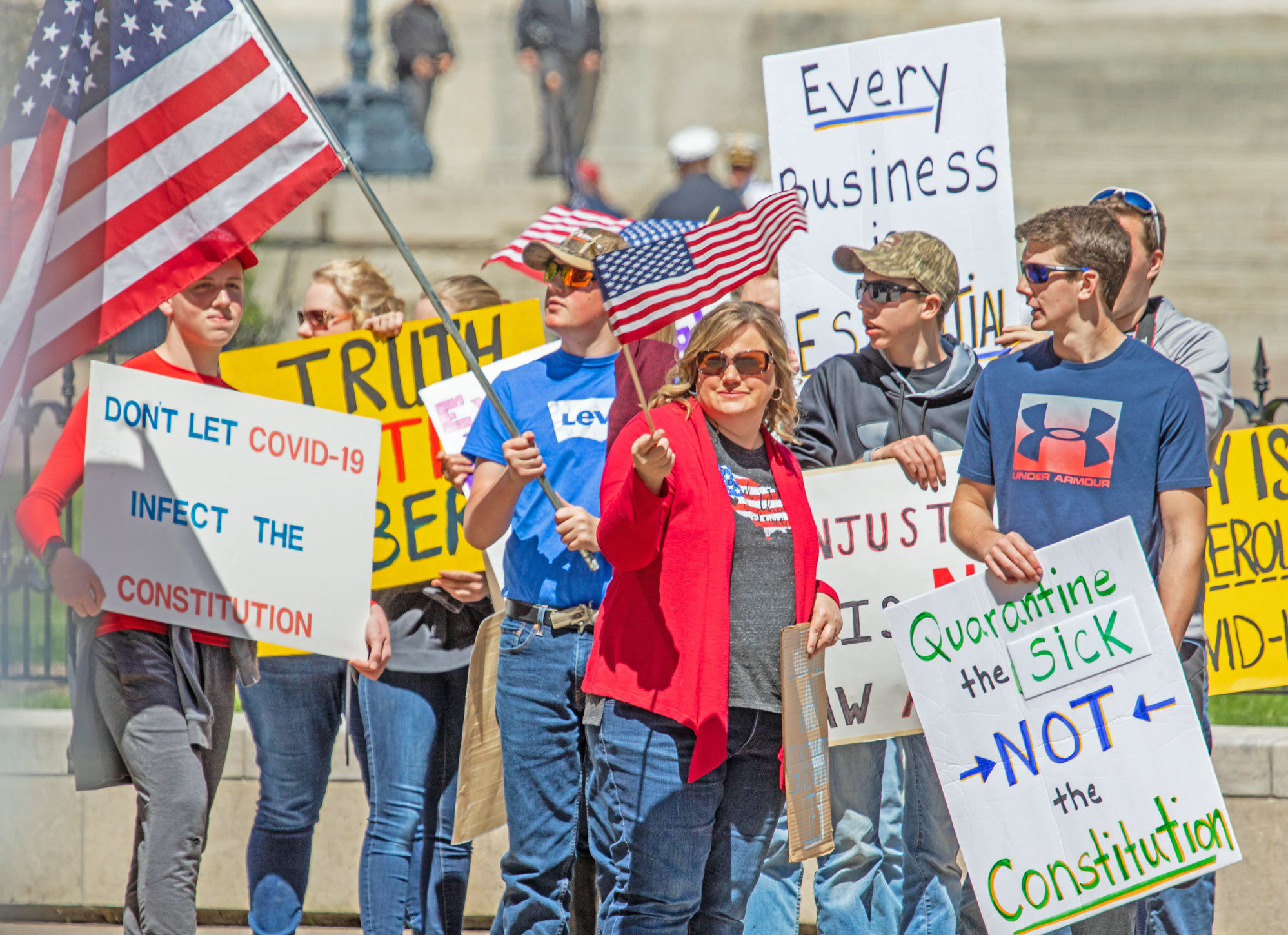
Several hundred anti-lockdown protesters rallied at the Ohio Statehouse on April 20.

Protests began in Ohio on April 9, with about 75 gathering outside of the Ohio Statehouse to protest Governor Mike DeWine's stay-at-home order. A second protest on April 13 grew to a group of 200–300 people.

The following weekend, protests began on April 17, with dozens protesting outside the east side of the Statehouse. The next day, April 18, the protests grew to hundreds. Protesters carried signs with slogans lamenting the loss of liberties for the sake of safety, as well as signs critical of state officials, and demanded that the state be immediately reopened.

The governor said that he would not interfere with the protests, provided they adhered to social distancing guidelines. Photographs from the protests on April 18 indicated that not all protesters had been honoring those guidelines; however, many of them stayed in cars.

On May 2, a small group of anti-lockdown protesters in Bexley patrolled the streets outside the private residence of Ohio Department of Health Director Dr. Amy Acton. The Bexley City Council briefly considered a local ordinance banning protests outside Acton's home, but ultimately decided against the measure.

==== Wisconsin ====
Several thousand people gathered at the state capitol in Madison on April 24 to protest the state's "Safer at Home" rules requiring social distancing and the closure of nonessential businesses. On that day the state health department announced 304 new positive tests—the most new cases most since the pandemic began.

On May 8, Wisconsin DHS reported that over 72 individuals who tested positive for COVID-19 had recently attended a "large event."

=== Northeast ===
==== Connecticut ====
Hundreds of protesters paraded through Hartford at the CT Liberty Rally on April 20 demanding that businesses closed by Governor Ned Lamont's coronavirus legislation be reopened. The Libertarian Party of Connecticut organized the event.

==== Massachusetts ====
About a dozen protesters gathered outside Governor Charlie Baker's home in Swampscott on April 23. Supporters made laps up and down the street in vehicles with MAGA flags, while medical workers tried to convince them to disperse. On April 26, protesters met outside a Bristol County government building in Fall River.

On May 4, hundreds gathered outside the Massachusetts State House for a Liberty Rally promoted by conservative radio show host Jeffrey Kuhner and by Super Happy Fun America, the organizers of the controversial 2019 Boston Straight Pride Parade. The rally crowd was "tightly packed", largely ignored social distancing protocols, and many in the group refused to wear masks.

==== New Hampshire ====
Hundreds, including libertarian talk show host Ian Freeman, protested at the New Hampshire State House on April 17 calling on Governor Chris Sununu to reopen the state.

==== New Jersey ====
On April 17, an anti-lockdown protest occurred in Trenton. Days later, charges were brought against the organizer of the rally for violating social-distancing guidelines. A smaller group of protesters also demonstrated in a Walmart parking lot in Hamilton that same day.

On May 20, hundreds of hairdressers and barbers organized by the NJ Salon And Spa Coalition gathered in Verona Park dressed in black to plead for the state to reopen their businesses.

On November 28, a pro-Trump Stop the Steal caravan protest traveled around New Jersey for several hours starting near the Trump Golf Course in Bedminster and ending near Governor Murphy's home in Middletown, where the focus shifted to criticizing the statewide lockdown restrictions.

==== New York ====
On April 22, scores of cars and trucks blared their horns near Albany's Capitol Park in a protest called Operation Gridlock: Reopen NY.

On May 1, hundreds protested in Commack, Long Island. Most protesters ignored social-distancing protocols, but no arrests were made, according to Suffolk County police.

==== Pennsylvania ====
On Patriots' Day, April 20, hundreds of protesters marched on Pennsylvania's state capitol building during a Monday morning Operation Gridlock Pennsylvania event in Harrisburg. The protest was organized by three groups, Re-open Pennsylvania, End the Lockdown Pennsylvania and Pennsylvania Against Excessive Quarantine, led in part by an Ohio-based Second Amendment rights activist named Chris Dorr.

==== Rhode Island ====
Anti-lockdown protesters clashed with a line of healthcare worker counter-protesters outside the Rhode Island State House on April 25.

==== Vermont ====
According to the VTDigger, 7 to 10 anti-lockdown protesters gathered in Montpelier on April 20.

=== South ===
==== Alabama ====
Approximately 60 anti-lockdown protesters marched near the Alabama State Capitol at a Reopen Alabama rally in Montgomery on April 21.

==== Florida ====
Anti-lockdown protesters marched from the Governor's Mansion to the Old Capitol Building in Tallahassee to demand that the state allow businesses to go back to work.

On May 11, a group of 20 to 30 protesters did squats and sit-up exercises outside the courthouse in Clearwater to call for the reopening of gyms.

==== Kentucky ====
Dozens of people gathered on the lawn of the state capitol in Frankfort in the afternoon of Wednesday, April 15, 2020, to protest Governor Andy Beshear's anti-coronavirus measures. They could also be heard inside the capitol building. Throughout Governor Beshear's one-hour press briefing, the protesters chanted continuously and occasionally blew a horn. The principal demand was that businesses in the state be reopened.

On May 25, a group of protesters organized by Take Back Kentucky, angry about the Second Amendment and coronavirus restrictions, hung the governor in effigy in front of the Kentucky statehouse. A sign reading "sic semper tyrannis" was attached to the hanging doll.

==== Louisiana ====
On July 14, a man was arrested after being asked by a police officer to wear a mask inside a Walmart in West Monroe. The man allegedly struck the officer twice with his car.

==== Maryland ====
On Saturday, April 18, ReOpen Maryland and Marylanders Against Excessive Quarantine held a driving protest in the state capital, Annapolis, against state restrictions continuing beyond May 1, drawing a claimed "at least 200 cars full of people." On Saturday, May 2, ReOpen Maryland organized another driving protest between rallies in Frederick, Chester, and Salisbury, a span of 155 miles. Republican Representative Andy Harris addressed the rally in Salisbury, comparing Maryland to North Korea, saying, "I didn't wake up in Communist China and I didn't wake up in North Korea...and tomorrow morning, I should be able to go to the church of my choice and worship the way I choose." ReOpen Maryland protested in Annapolis without cars on Friday, May 15, and again on Saturday, May 30. Another rally was held in Westminster on Saturday, June 6.

Reopen Baltimore County held a rally in the county seat of Towson on Friday, May 22. Reopen Howard County held a rally at the Howard County courthouse in the county seat of Ellicott City on Tuesday, May 26.

In late June, the chair and co-founder of ReOpen Maryland said that he had tested positive for coronavirus but he would not help with contact tracing efforts. He said that got coronavirus "because Satan deemed to get it. Because he wanted to quiet my work." He said later that he and his family contracted COVID-19 and that he developed pneumonia because of it, but he still does not believe that the state needs to be shut down.

On September 18, 2020, Reopen Maryland and Return2Learn Maryland Schools organized a protest march in downtown Annapolis urging the governor to reopen all Maryland businesses and schools. Attendance was described as "hundreds of people" or "nearly a hundred Marylanders, most without masks".

==== Mississippi ====
Dozens of protesters carrying Trump campaign merchandise and Confederate Flags rallied to "Open Up Mississippi" in Jackson on April 25.

==== North Carolina ====
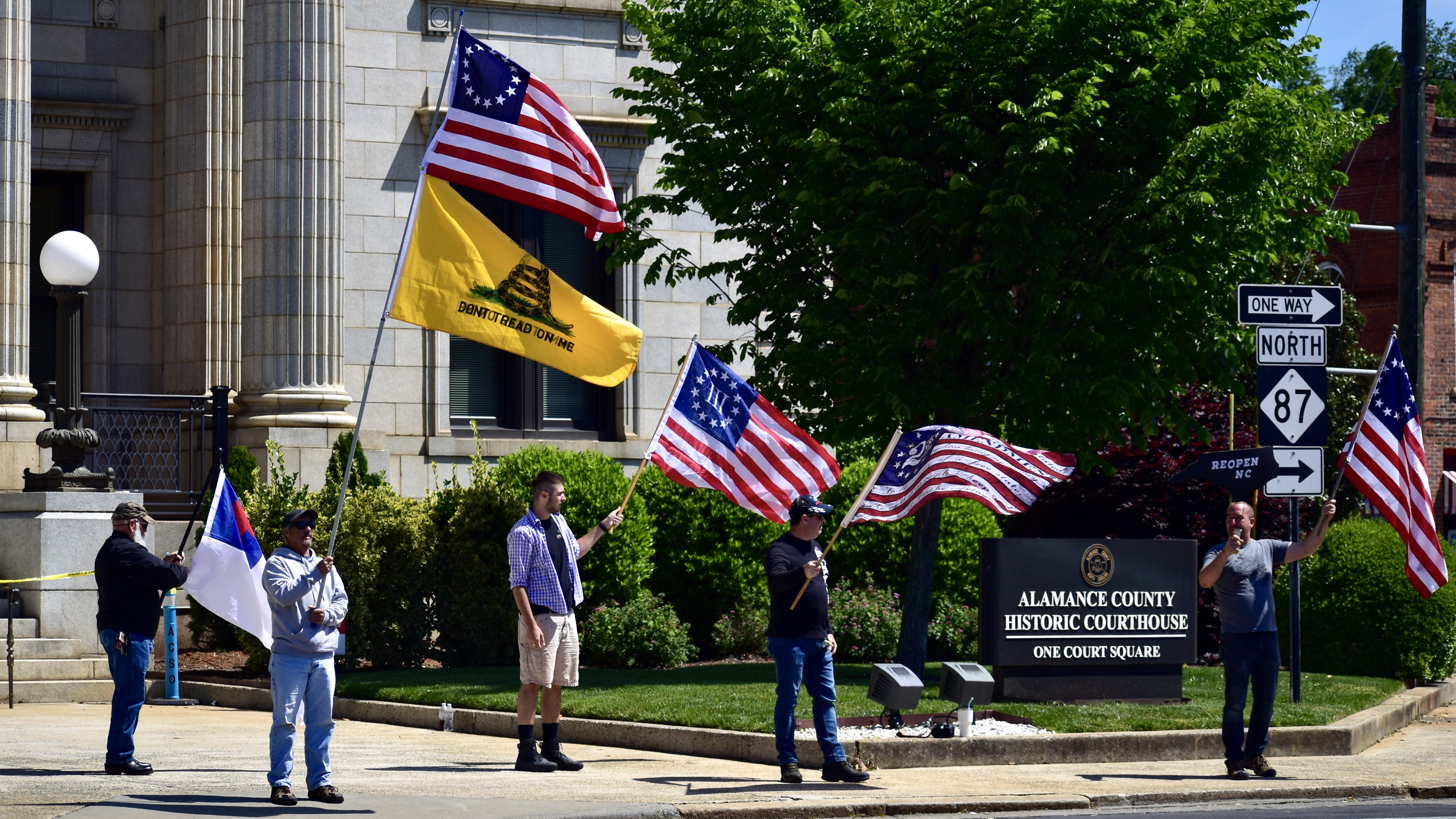
An anti-lockdown protest in Graham, North Carolina, on May 7

In Raleigh, about 100 people protested outside the capitol building on April 14. One woman was arrested for violating the governor's order and refusing to leave the parking lot. A second ReOpen NC protest of about 300 people was held on April 21—a day on which the state's coronavirus death toll increased by 34 to a total of 213. A leader of the ReOpen NC group revealed in a Facebook post that she tested positive for COVID-19. She described herself as an "asymptomatic COVID19 positive patient." After her antibody test came back negative but her COVID-19 test result was positive, she was given a quarantine order. She has alleged that this violated her civil rights.

In North Carolina some anti-lockdown protesters were known to be carrying massive amounts of weapons, including an AT-4 Anti-Tank Rocket Launcher.

==== Texas ====
On Saturday, April 18, hundreds protested at the statehouse in Austin, Texas, at a You Can't Close America rally organized by InfoWars' Alex Jones.

On May 12, hair salon owner Shelley Luther was found guilty of civil and criminal contempt in Dallas for ignoring a temporary restraining order. After earning the support from Sean Hannity and Ted Cruz for her alleged civil disobedience and half a million dollars in GoFundMe money, she admitted to receiving $18,000 in stimulus money designed to help her business while it remained closed.

On May 23, a few dozen protesters gathered outside the Texas State Capitol in Austin for a Texas Freedom Rally sponsored by the Texas Freedom Coalition. Shelly Luther was a speaker.

On July 4, 2020, an event called The Freedom Rally was held in front of the Tom Green County Courthouse in San Angelo to protest masks, lockdowns, the science behind COVID-19 and "liberal media." In August 2021, rally organizer Caleb Wallace died of COVID-19, leaving behind three daughters and a pregnant wife.

=== West ===
==== Alaska ====
On April 23, a caravan of vehicles paraded through downtown Anchorage honking horns, waving flags and displaying signs that read "Open Alaska", "Don't Tread on Me" and "Shrink government, open business." The protesters primarily opposed Democratic mayor Ethan Berkowitz for being too slow in ending the lockdown. Protesters expressed that they were on the same side as the state's Republican governor on the issue.

==== California ====
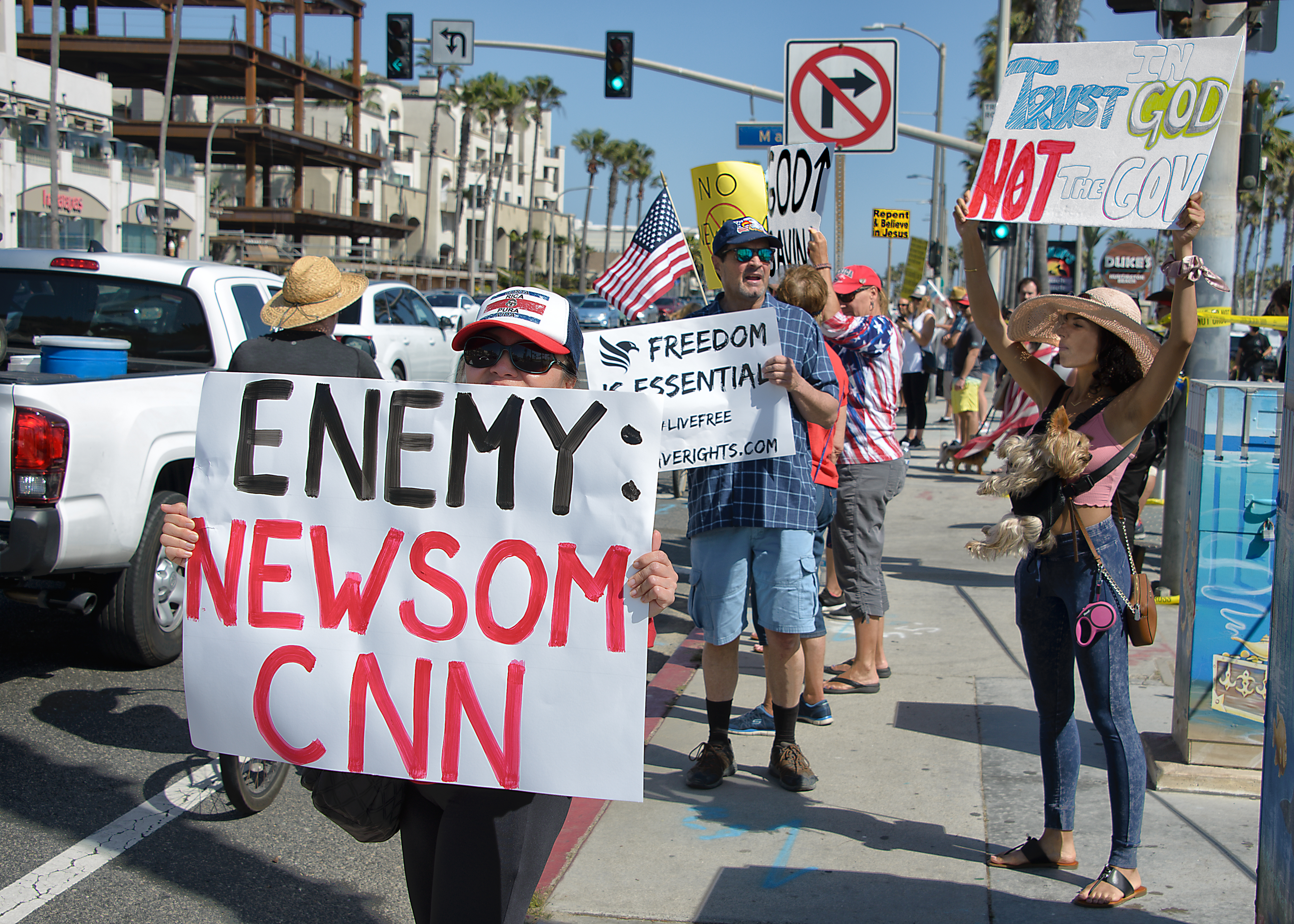
Protest against COVID-19 closure in Huntington Beach, California, on May 3. The city has been a hotbed of anti-lockdown protests throughout 2020.

On April 17, a group of more than 200 protested against the stay-at-home rules in Huntington Beach. The protesters demanded the reopening of California's economy. A 36-year-old attorney was arrested for pulling a knife on a television crew, forcing them into their van and ordering them to delete any footage they had filmed of him. He held the crew in the van against their will before being stopped and arrested by police.

On April 18, several hundred people protested in downtown San Diego, saying they wanted businesses and beaches reopened. Another protest occurred April 19 in Encinitas. On April 20, hundreds of protesters marched or drove around the California State Capitol in Sacramento. The rally was organized by the Freedom Angels, a group best known for its opposition to mandatory vaccination. Following this protest, the California Highway Patrol announced that it will no longer issue permits for any events on state properties.

On April 25, at least three protesters were arrested for violating the stay-at-home order and refusing to leave a closed beach in Encinitas.

On April 25, at least 200 people protested at A Day of Liberty San Diego Freedom Rally on Pacific Beach, organized by the same people who organized the previous week's downtown rally. The rally was strongly condemned by community leaders, but arrests were not reported.

On April 26, protesters carrying signs that said "SM BIZ MATTERS" and "My constitutional rights are essential" gathered in Palm Springs.

On May 1, a series of simultaneous protests all over California were planned for Friday but only three attracted large crowds. Hundreds gathered and 32 were arrested in Sacramento. Two-and-a-half thousand to 3,000 people gathered in Huntington Beach to protest the Governor's new order to re-close beaches in Orange County.

On May 1, 1,000 anti-lockdown protesters rallied in Ventura. The event was described as a "nonpolitical peaceful protest to fully reopen California." Ventura Police Department officials said they estimated the size at about 1,000 people.

On May 1, about 100 cars draped in American flags and signs reading "Open Our Country" and "Remember the Constitution" jammed De la Guerra Plaza in Santa Barbara on Friday afternoon.

On May 2, 100-plus anti-lockdown protesters rallied in Laguna Beach, California. An MSNBC reporter was attacked mid-broadcast by a protester who got in his personal space and yelled at him to "take off that damn mask."

On May 2, a lone man protested face-mask requirements by openly wearing a Ku Klux Klan hood at Vons supermarket in Santee. Less than a week later, a couple pushing a stroller shopped at a Food 4 Less in Santee with Nazi swastikas on their masks.

On May 3, about 300 protesters rallied in Rancho Cucamonga, ignored social-distancing rules, held Trump banners and chanted "Four more years."

On May 21, the leader of a stay-at-home order protest was arrested in San Clemente for refusing to comply with a dispersal order.

On May 23, over 2000 protesters joined the LibertyFest anti-lockdown rally next to the California State Capitol in Sacramento.

On July 14, gyms in Riverside and University Heights, San Diego remained open despite Governor Newsom's renewed statewide closings.

On July 15, a grocery store employee in Los Angeles used pepper spray against a customer who allegedly assaulted a woman after being asked to wear a mask.

On July 28, about five dozen hairstylists gathered in front of San Diego City Hall to protest county rules prohibiting salons from providing services indoors.

On November 30, hundreds, including former UFC champion Tito Ortiz, gathered at a pier in Huntington Beach for a "curfew breaker" protest against COVID-19 restrictions.

On January 24, 2021, a church group protested San Diego County's purple-tier restrictions at a Let Us Worship event in El Cajon. Mayor William Wells led prayers while hundreds of mostly maskless protesters ignored social-distancing protocols.

On April 13, 2021, anti-mask protesters stormed a grocery store in Carmel Valley, San Diego, taking an emotional toll on staff.

In November 2021, a protest against government-mandated COVID-19 vaccinations led to a chain-reaction crash at the entrance to the Golden Gate Bridge. During the demonstration, a vehicle collision occurred involving two California Highway Patrol officers and three Golden Gate Bridge employees.

On April 10, 2022, thousands gathered for a Defeat the Mandates rally in Grand Park in front of Los Angeles City Hall. Truckers from the People's Convoy and protesters from as far away as New York listened to speakers and musical performers opposed to several COVID-19-related bills in the state legislature.

==== Colorado ====
A Facebook event was created for a gathering called Operation Gridlock Denver for April 19, with more than 550 people stating they were going to the event. The operation plan was to "drive to the capitol in Denver and gridlock the roads in protest to the mandatory lockdowns and violation of constitutional rights ..." Footage from the counter-protest went viral after counter-protestors dressed as nurses silently stood in front of cars participating in the Operation Gridlock protest, while wearing their scrubs and N95 face masks. One nurse who participated in the counter-protest stated the protest felt like "a slap in the face to medical workers". The counter-protestors claimed to be nurses from a local hospital but declined to identify themselves or their employer.

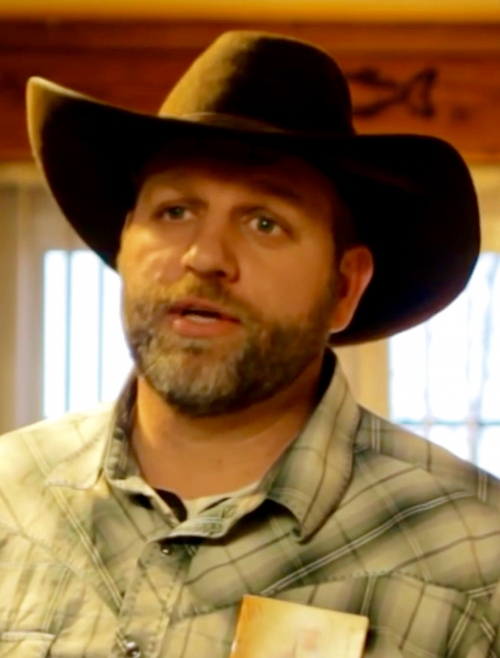
Ammon Bundy, an anti-government militant and activist, primarily active in the Pacific Northwest, most notably in Oregon and Idaho

==== Idaho ====
Several hundred protesters assembled at the Idaho State Capitol building in Boise under the slogan "Disobey Idaho" on April 17. The protest was organized by three conservative groups—the Idaho Freedom Foundation, Idaho Second Amendment Alliance and Health Freedom Idaho—and emceed by Republican state representative Tammy Nichols.

On August 25, activist Ammon Bundy was arrested twice in two days for trespassing at the Idaho State Capitol. Dozens more pushed past police and were allowed to sit in the gallery overlooking the Idaho House of Representatives without masks. Speaker Scott Bedke ultimately allowed them to fill every seat despite social-distancing rules.

On March 6, 2021, more than a hundred protesters gathered outside the Idaho State Capitol for a "burn the mask" event organized by the husband of Idaho state representative Dorothy Moon and others.

==== Nevada ====
Hundreds of protesters gathered on April 18 in Carson City at the Nevada State Capitol and on Carson Street chanting "End the shutdown", "One nation under God", and "Recall Sisolak".

==== New Mexico ====
A small group of anti-lockdown protesters gathered at Civic Plaza in Albuquerque for an Operation Gridlock event on April 24. Small protests also took place in Santa Fe and Farmington.

==== Oregon ====
Dozens of protesters circled the Oregon State Capitol in Salem in their vehicles on April 17, 2020. 200 people gathered outside City Hall in Redmond. The Re-Open Oregon rally was held on May 1 and 2. On December 21, during an anti-lockdown protest, about 300 demonstrators attempted to storm the Oregon State Capitol, but they were warded off by responding officers with the Oregon State Police. At the time, the State Capitol was hosting a special legislative session closed to the public. The group included members of far-right groups such as Proud Boys and Patriot Prayer.

==== Utah ====
Hundreds protested on the lawn at Salt Lake City's Washington Square on Saturday, April 18. The day before the protest, according to a police affidavit, Mayor Erin Mendenhall was threatened by a man who stated, "The mayor needs to open up the city. If she doesn't, she'll be forcibly removed from office. There's a protest tomorrow and if things don't change, a civil war is coming, and the police can't stop me." The man was arrested and booked for making a terroristic threat and electronic communication harassment.

==== Washington ====
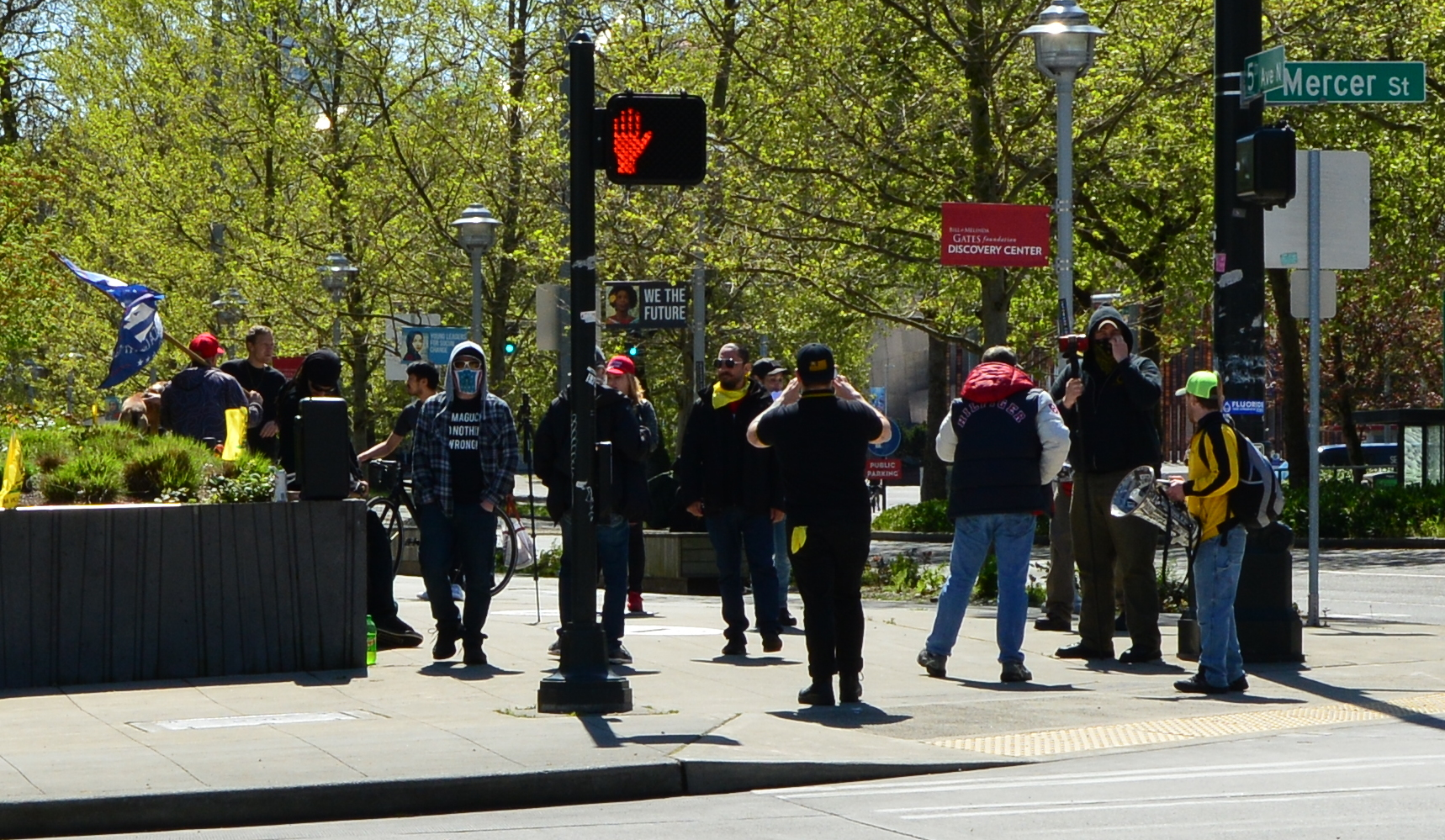
Protest against COVID-19 closures in Seattle on April 25

The Kitsap County Republican Party coordinated an event, Hazardous Liberty! Defend the Constitution!, in Olympia on April 19. The Olympia event was attended by more than two thousand people. Speakers included three Republican state legislators.

On April 26, dozens of boaters in Lake Union protested the state ban on recreational fishing that was part of Governor Jay Inslee's "Stay at Home, Stay Healthy" order.

==== Wyoming ====
On April 9, about 20 people protested what they called "government overreach" at Pioneer Park in Casper.

Republican Governor Mark Gordon appeared at a protest outside the Wyoming State Capitol in Cheyenne on April 20.

On April 24, about 35 people attended a "Rally for Choice to Work" in downtown Casper.

== Response ==
On April 16, President Donald Trump issued guidelines for how to phase out restrictions, saying that governors would decide how to reopen their own states and suggesting a cautious three-phase approach. The next day he reacted to the protests against social restrictions by encouraging the protests, tweeting "LIBERATE MICHIGAN!" and "LIBERATE MINNESOTA!" Trump has continued to defend the protesters by saying; "They seem very responsible to me" and "These are people expressing their views." Stephen Moore, a right-wing member of his economic council, was criticized for comparing the protesters to Rosa Parks. Maia Niguel Hoskin of Vox claimed that "ignorance, privilege, and anti-black racism" was a main factor behind the protests.

On April 20, 2020, Facebook announced that it was blocking events and messages from anti-quarantine protest groups "when gatherings do not follow the health parameters established by the government and are therefore unlawful". The governors of New Jersey and Nebraska say they have not asked Facebook to take down the posts. Despite Facebook apparently acting on its own volition, Donald Trump Jr. claimed Facebook was "colluding with state governments to quash free speech".

=== State governments ===
Governor Jay Inslee (D-WA) accused the president of "fomenting domestic rebellion" with his "LIBERATE!" tweets, saying, "The president's statements this morning encourage illegal and dangerous acts. He is putting millions of people in danger of contracting COVID-19." On This Week two days later, Inslee said the president's call to ignore his own team's guidelines was "schizophrenic".

When asked if there is a fundamental right to go to work, New York Governor Andrew Cuomo encouraged protesters to get an essential job.

North Carolina Governor Roy Cooper responded to the first protest in his state, saying, "Some people want to completely obliterate these restrictions. It would be a catastrophe. The numbers are very clear that the interventions that we've entered into—social gatherings, limitations on bars and restaurants, the stay at home order—those kinds of things are working."

=== General public ===
On April 16, Pew Research polls indicated that 32% of Americans worried state governments would take too long to re-allow public activities, while 66% feared the state restrictions would be lifted too quickly.

Many lawmakers and other public figures have condemned the protests as unsafe and ill-advised. Republican Mike Shirkey, the Majority Leader of the Michigan Senate, called the protesters in his state "a bunch of jackasses."

Healthcare workers in multiple states held demonstrations calling for better protective equipment, safer working conditions, and a stronger government pandemic response.

== See also ==
- Protests against responses to the COVID-19 pandemic
- Political impact of the COVID-19 pandemic
- Strikes during the COVID-19 pandemic
- U.S. state and local government responses to the COVID-19 pandemic
- Operation Warp Speed
- Open the States
- Antiscience
