= Health Freedom Idaho =

State-level anti-vaccination group

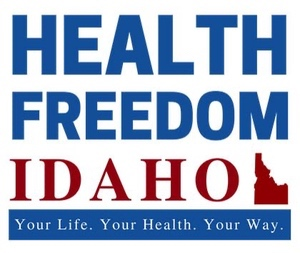
- HFI logo
- Abbreviation: HFI
- Formation: 2016
- Purpose: Anti-vaccination group
- Region served: Idaho
- Official language: English
- Executive Director: Miste Gardner-Karlfeldt
- Co-director: Sarah Clendenon

Health Freedom Idaho is an anti-vaccine group that also opposes health regulations, such as mask requirements and restrictions on the operation of businesses due to the COVID-19 pandemic. Founded sometime shortly before October 2016, the organization describes its mission as including "preserv[ing] our freedoms in regard to the health care of our choice." While the group's activities have mainly taken place in the Boise area, the organization has a northern chapter.

The organization has worked with the Idaho Second Amendment Alliance, the Idaho Freedom Foundation, and supporters of Ammon Bundy on protests of public health measures in response to the COVID-19 pandemic. The group has also expressed opposition to the construction of 5G transmitters based on the belief they could harm health and has opposed changes in Idaho state laws that exempt parents from the requirement to seek emergency medical care for a child if they instead perform faith healing on the child. The group's website includes promotion of alternative medicine.

== Leadership ==
As of 2020, the organization was headed by executive director Miste Gardner Karlfelde. Sarah Clendenon formerly served as co-executive director, and Sarah Walton Brady previously served as an executive committee member.

== Faith healing ==
In 2016, Health Freedom Idaho opposed proposals to remove a "faith healing" exception from Idaho state law; under the exception, parents and guardians who invoke a belief in faith healing can refuse to seek medical treatment (including emergency medical treatment) for ill children. Several Health Freedom Idaho members attended a meeting of the Children at Risk of Faith Healing working group to provide testimony against changing the laws under discussion. The working group included state legislators and was formed at the request of then-governor Butch Otter to examine the Idaho laws. In the five years prior to the hearing, there were several cases of children dying in such circumstances. The working group ultimately opted not to submit a recommendation to the Idaho Legislature on whether or not to change the laws.

== Anti-vaccination activism ==
Heath Freedom Idaho engaged in anti-vaccination activism and has anti-vaccination materials on their website, although they have stated that they are not an anti-vaccination group.

In November 2016, the group falsely claimed in a blog post that the flu shot increases risk of fetal death. This post would go on to circulate widely on Instagram in 2019.

During Idaho's 2017 legislative session, Health Freedom Idaho advocated a bill at the state level that would allow parents to provide a letter written by the parent to exempt their child from vaccination requirements rather than using a school-provided form to do so. Some anti-vaccination activists, including Health Freedom Idaho's Sarah Walton-Brady, opposed the use of school forms that included a field for parents to acknowledge that "I am aware that my child may contract a vaccine-preventable disease." The bill died without receiving a hearing in the Senate. In January 2018, an Idaho Senate panel introduced a bill similar to the 2017 bill with the support of Health Freedom Idaho, which never received a hearing.

In 2019, Heath Freedom Idaho opposed a new state administrative rule requiring students entering 12th grade to get a meningitis booster shot. The rule was ultimately adopted.

== COVID-19 related protests ==
Health Freedom Idaho has organized, co-organized, and participated in several protests of health measures taken by the Idaho state government and the City of Boise in response to the COVID-19 pandemic. These have included protests of the stay-home order issued by governor Brad Little in April 2020, of mask orders issued by the City of Boise, and of emergency legislation considered by the state legislature related to mail-in voting and protection from COVID-19 related liability for businesses and government bodies. They also organized a demonstration at a hospital in protest of the hospital's decision to require staff to be vaccinated against COVID-19.

They co-organized these protests with a range of other organizations including the Idaho Freedom Foundation, the Idaho Second Amendment Alliance, Ammon Bundy and his supporters, and the John Birch Society. These events featured speakers including Washington State Representative Matt Shea, Idaho State Representative Heather Scott, and Ammon Bundy.

Some protests included demonstrations outside the homes of officials, such as those of governor Brad Little, the health officials participating in a Central District Health meeting, and a police officer who arrested former Health Freedom Idaho member Sarah Walton Brady for refusing to leave a park that was closed due to the pandemic. Other locations of demonstrations included the Idaho State Capitol, outside the Boise City Hall, and a park.

Some demonstrations included setting a fire in which masks were burned, and the open carrying of firearms was noted at some protests.

One of the more distinctive demonstrations was a self-styled special legislative session called by Health Freedom Idaho and other organizers in opposition to the governor's response to the pandemic.

Another notable protest occurred on August 24, 2020, at the Idaho State Capitol. The demonstration garnered national media attention after participants broke a glass door and entered an area of the House Gallery reserved for legislators with health concerns. Health Freedom Idaho members heckled legislators and several were arrested. Some participants carried weapons while participating in this protest of a special legislative session to consider bills on early voting and shielding businesses and government bodies from legal liability related to COVID-19.

Health Freedom Idaho's executive director also urged group members to participate in a protest of Biden's visit to the National Interagency Fire Center in Boise on September 13, 2021, a demonstration was on behalf of several causes, including opposition to the vaccine mandate announced by President Biden the previous week.

== See also ==
- Herd immunity
- Science Moms
- Vaccination policy
- Vaccine hesitancy
- Face masks during the COVID-19 pandemic in the United States
- Faith healing
