= Radhika =

Radhika may refer to:

- Radha, a Hindu goddess and eternal consort of Krishna
- Radhika (given name), an Indian given name
  - Radhika (Malayalam actress), Indian actress in Malayalam cinema
  - Radhika (choreographer), in South Indian films
  - Kalamandalam Radhika, Indian dancer and choreographer, and actor in Malayalam films and television
  - Radhika Sarathkumar, Indian actress in Tamil and Telugu cinema
- Radhika (TV series), Kannada language series on Udaya TV
- Radhika, the main character of the Zee TV serial Choti Bahu
- Radhika Menon, a fictional character portrayed by Pallavi Joshi in the 2022 Indian film The Kashmir Files, based on Nivedita Menon

== See also ==
- Radika, a river in Europe
- Radha (disambiguation)
