= Climate change in Michigan =

Climate change in the US state of Michigan

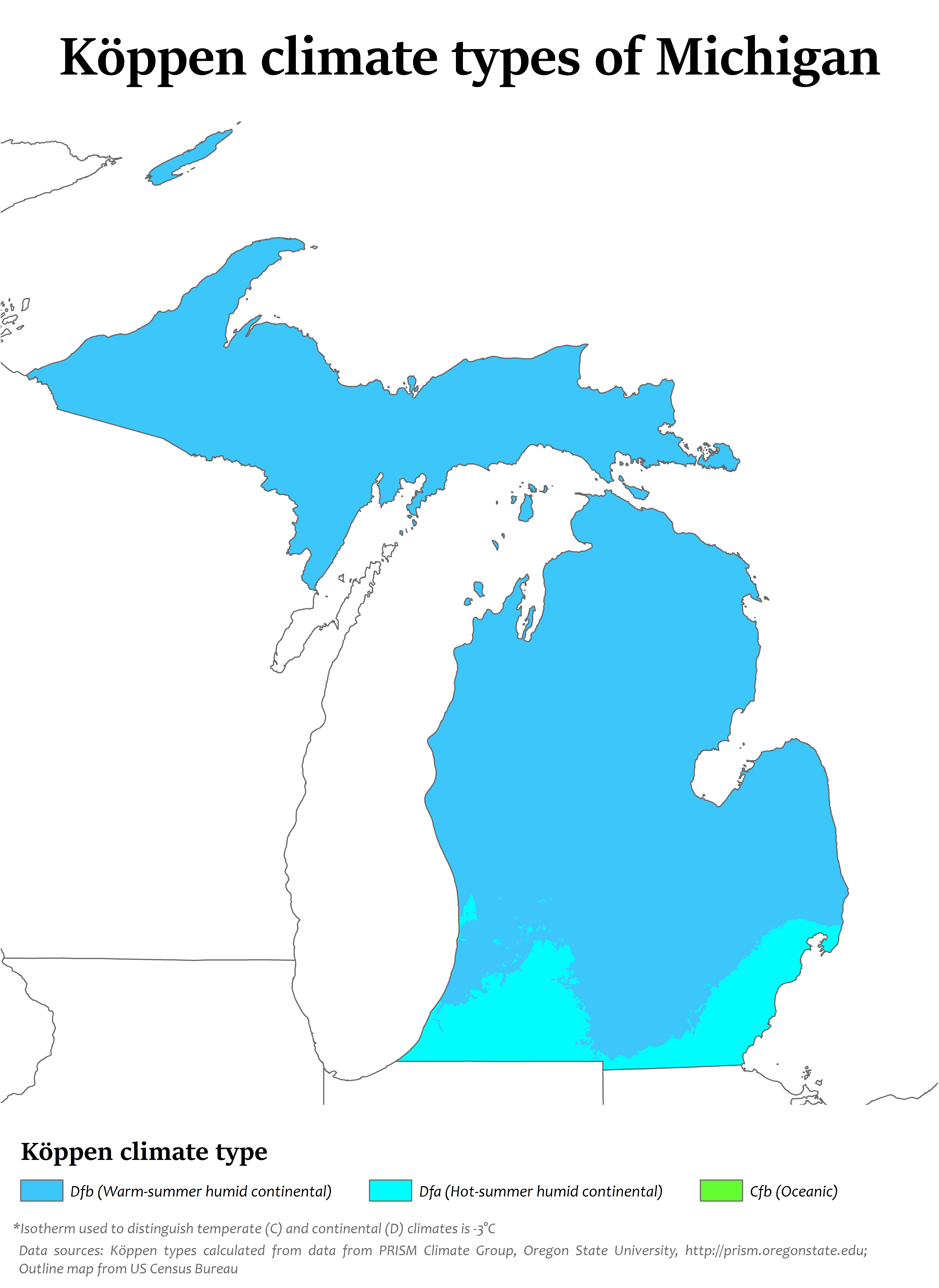
Köppen climate types in Michigan, showing most of the state to be warm-summer humid continental, with some hot-summer humid continental portions.

Climate change in Michigan encompasses the effects of climate change, attributed to man-made increases in atmospheric greenhouse gases, in the U.S. state of Michigan.

The Michigan Department of Environment, Great Lakes, and Energy, formerly the Michigan Department of Environmental Quality, in 2015 reported:

Michigan's climate is changing. Most of the state has warmed two to three degrees (F) in the last century. Severe thunderstorms and tornadoes are becoming more frequent, and ice cover on the Great Lakes is forming later or melting sooner. In the coming decades, the state will have more extremely hot days, which may harm public health in urban areas and corn harvests in rural areas.

Humans have increased the amount of carbon dioxide in the Earth's atmosphere by 40% since the 1700s, causing the atmosphere to warm, allowing more evaporation, and prompting more rain. Heavy storms have increased in frequency and now account for 31% more precipitation than 50 years ago. The increase in heavy rainfall contributes to widespread flooding across most of the state, especially in the downstate and Detroit areas. Flooding has allowed land pollutants, such as Escherichia coli, nitrates, and phosphates, to flow into Michigan’s freshwater sources. In 2014, the government of Toledo, Ohio, had to shut down its Great Lake water supply due to contamination from bacteria and algae. The rising temperatures have resulted in more and more people experiencing heat-related injuries and illnesses, and in some cases, death. Michigan has the MI Healthy Climate Plan, which intends to reach 100% carbon neutrality by 2050. The plan aims to provide good-paying jobs and a healthier, more sustainable environment for Michiganders and avoid the worst impacts of the climate crisis.

The overall effects of climate change are expected to be widespread, mixed, and net-negative. The 2014 National Climate Assessment of the Great Lakes region, led by University of Michigan scholars, stated that climate change would have mixed but net-negative effects in the region by 2050. Specifically, longer growing seasons and higher carbon dioxide levels were predicted to increase crop yield, but heat waves, droughts, and floods were also forecast to increase. The report predicted declines in ice cover on the Great Lakes that would lengthen the commercial shipping season. However, the regions would also suffer from invasive species and harmful algal blooms. The negative scenario described in the study used a 3.8 to 4.9 °F (2.1 to 2.7 °C) range for 2000 to 2050 warming, compared with the 1 °F (0.56 °C) of historical warming for 1950 to 2000.

== Climate change impacts ==
=== Heavy precipitation and flooding ===
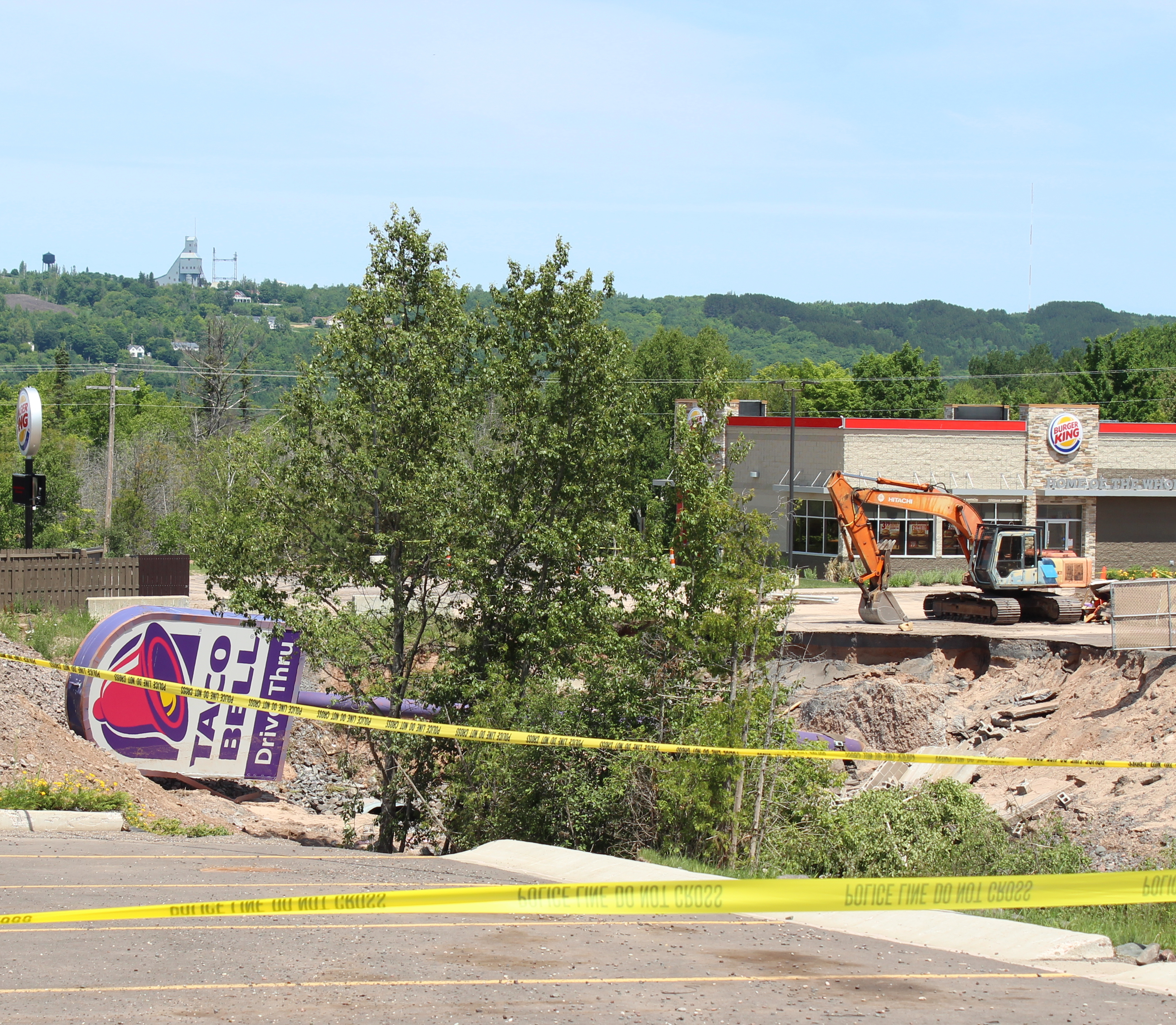
Flood damage in Houghton, 2018

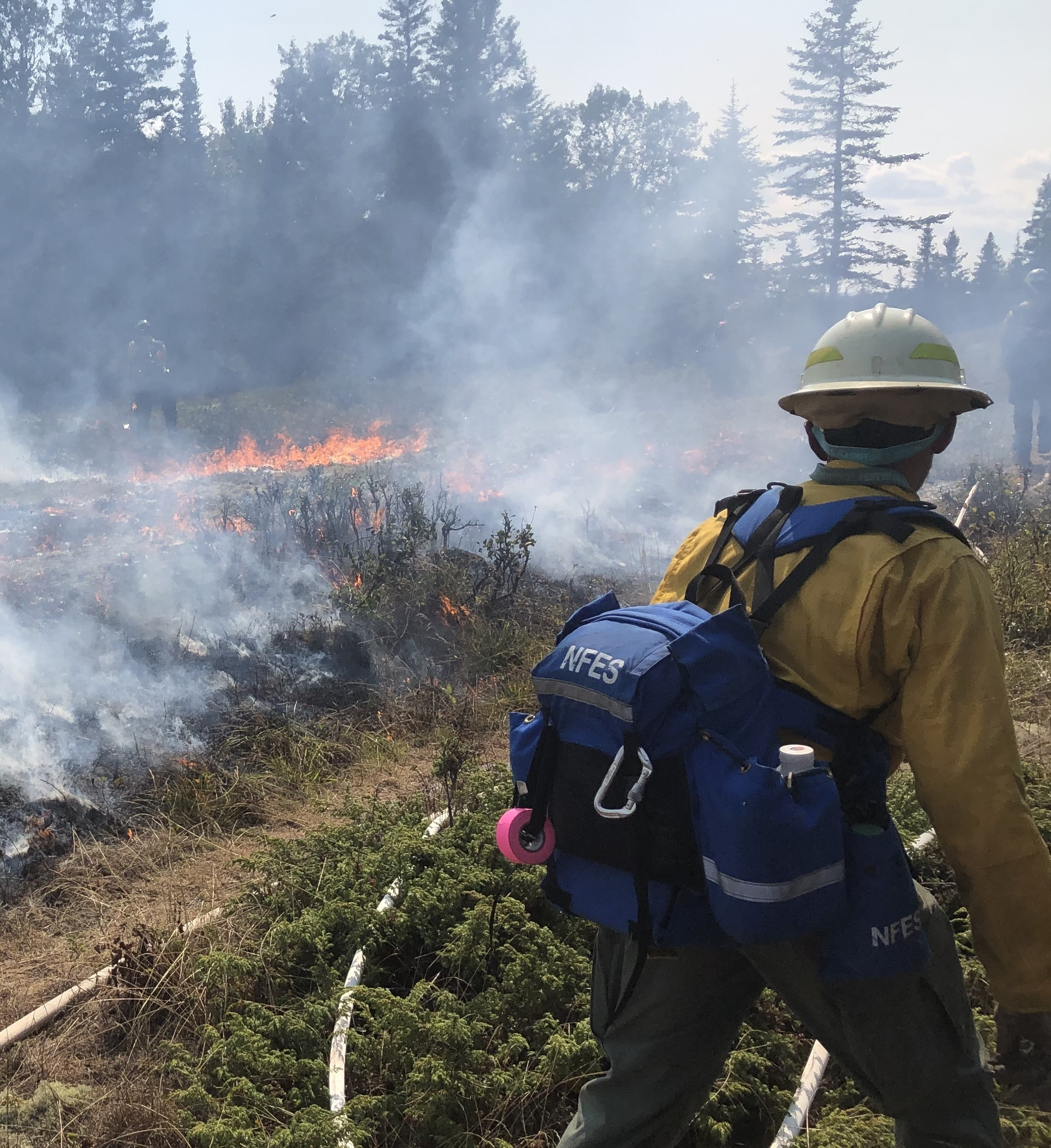
Wildfire fighting, Isle Royale, 2021

In the state of Michigan there are over 11,000 lakes that are 5 acres or larger. With this much water in the state, Michigan is more susceptible to flooding.

"Changing the climate is likely to increase the frequency of floods in Michigan. Over the last half century, average annual precipitation in most of the Midwest has increased by 5 to 10 percent. But rainfall during the four wettest days of the year has increased about 35 percent. During the next century, spring rainfall and annual precipitation are likely to increase, and severe rainstorms are likely to intensify. Each of these factors will tend to further increase the risk of flooding".

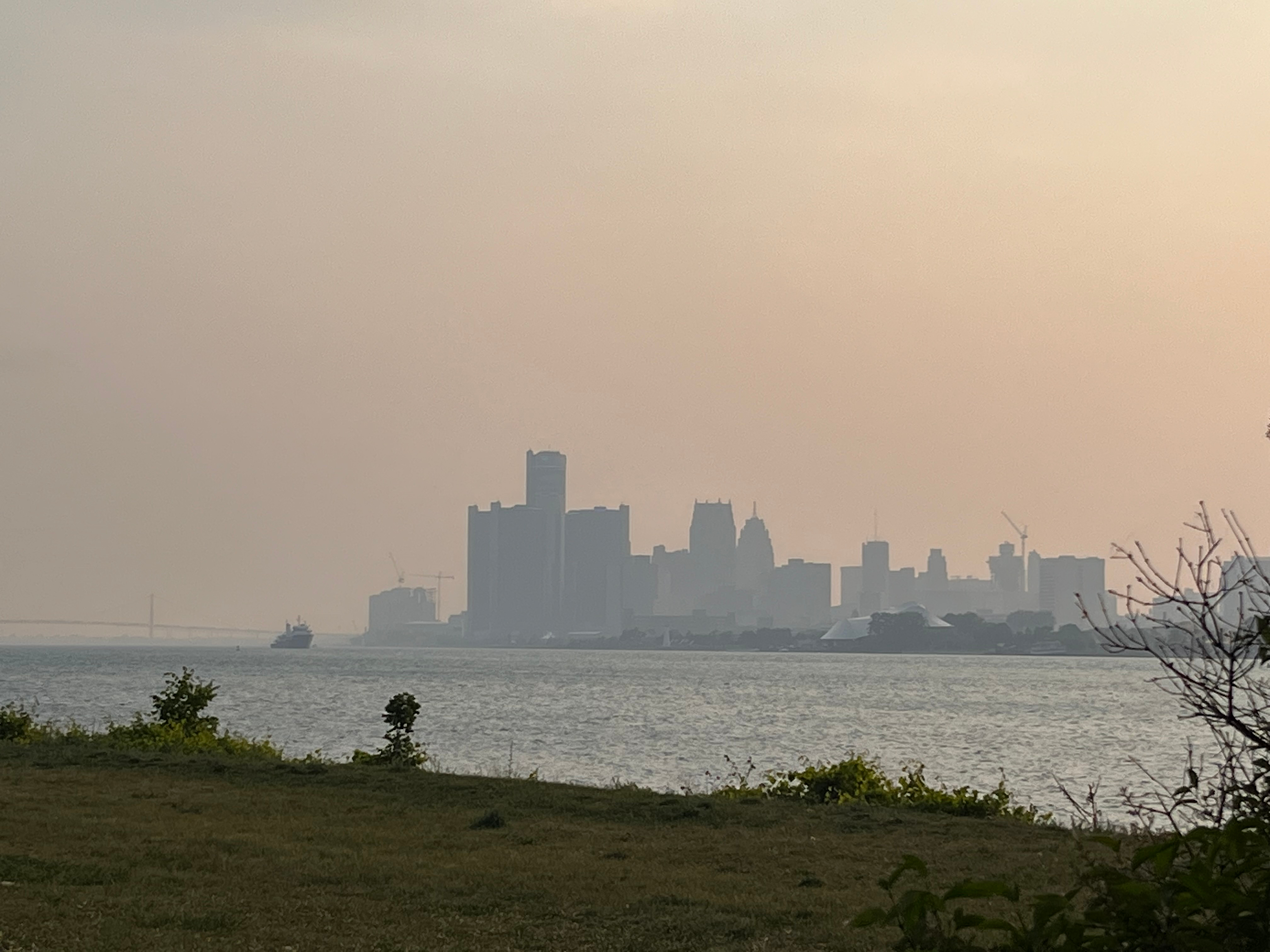
Wildfire smoke covering Detroit, 2023 wildfire season

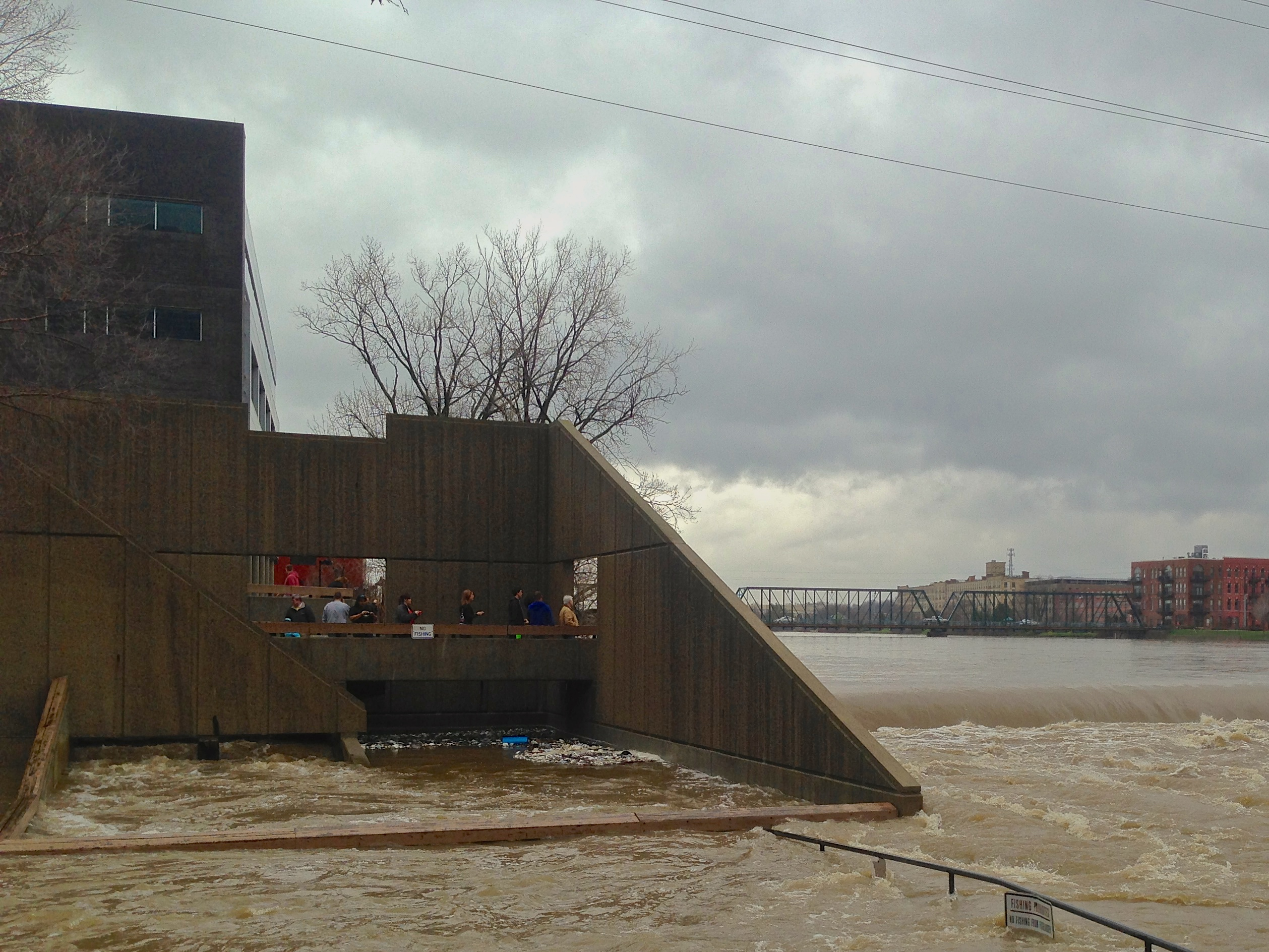
Flooding in Grand Rapids, 2013

Michigan recorded an annual average of two or more inches of rain during a period of just over one day. This is significant as it is more rain days per year than when record-keeping began in 1900. Climate change could potentially increase the occurrence of 100-year floods. This is significant because 100-year floods are major floods that have a 1 percent chance of occurring in any given year. Michigan's Upper and Lower Peninsula could see an increase of 25 to 500 percent increase of 100- year floods from 2040 to 2060 compared to those seen from 1950 to 2000.

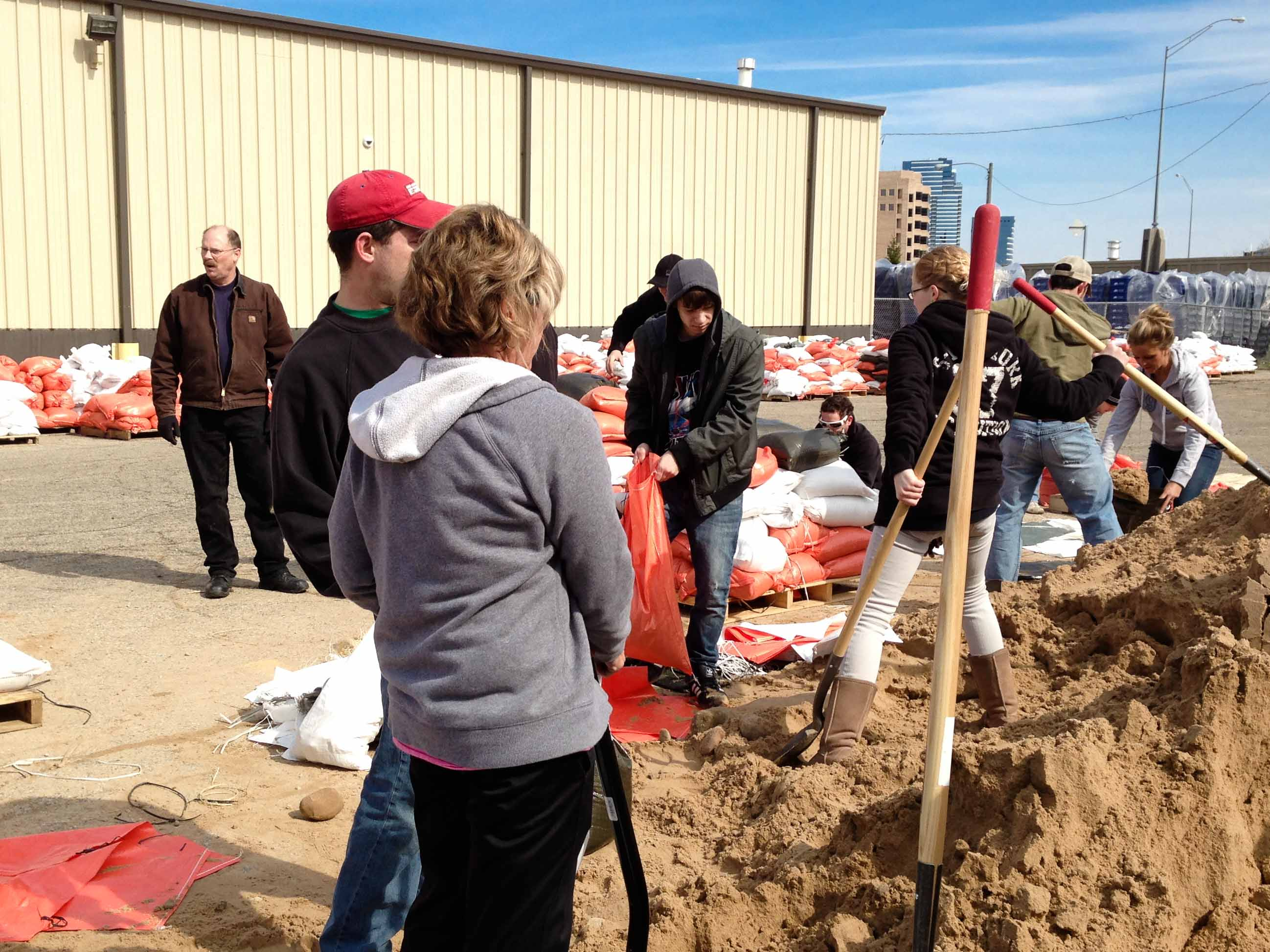
Filling sandbags, 2013 Grand Rapids floods

2.6 million people in Michigan get their drinking water from private wells located at their household. These types of wells are not regulated to maximum standards. Extreme rainfall can affect these private wells, which threatens the safety of many individuals’ drinking water. When private wells experience heavy rain, they can trigger extensive runoff. Extensive runoff can lead to bacterial contamination which are not normally treated. It is generally the responsibility of the home owner to be aware of contamination. With the potential of more floods, it is posing a threat to Michigan's agricultural industry resulting in loss of crop production and delaying when farmers can plant their fields.

=== Great Lakes ===
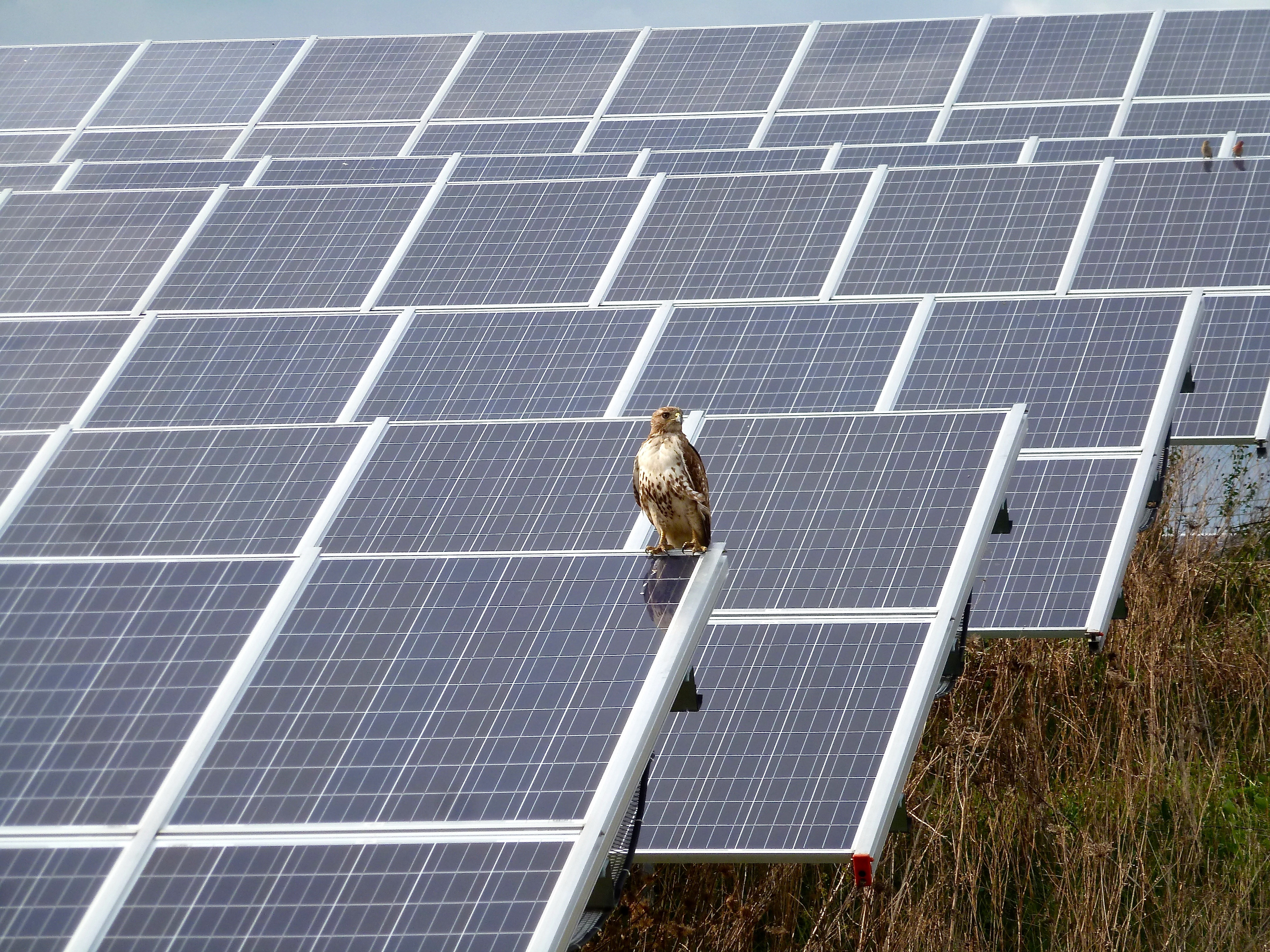
Solar arrays, Ann Arbor

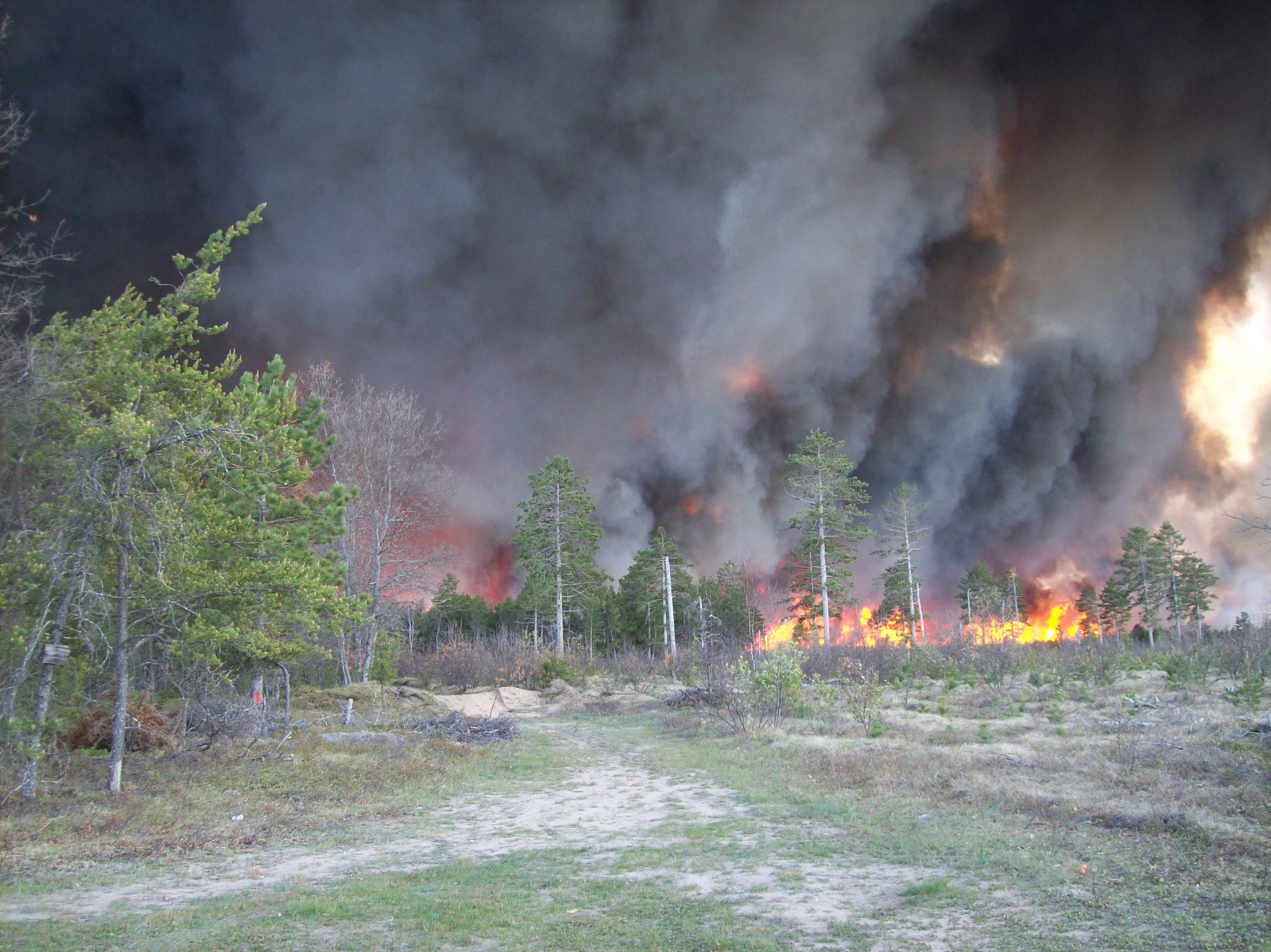
Wildfire, Huron-Manistee National Forest, 2010

"Changing the climate is likely to harm water quality in Lake Erie and Lake Michigan. Warmer water tends to cause more algal blooms, which can be unsightly, harm fish, and degrade water quality. During August 2014, an algal bloom in Lake Erie prompted the Monroe County Health Department to advise residents in four townships to avoid using tap water for cooking and drinking. Severe storms increase the amount of pollutants that run off from land to water, so the risk of algal blooms will be greater if storms become more severe. Severe rainstorms can also cause sewers to overflow into lakes and rivers, which can threaten beach safety and drinking water supplies. For example, heavy rains in August 2014 led to nearly 10 billion gallons of sewer overflows in southeastern Michigan, much of which ended up in Lake St. Clair and eventually Lake Erie. More severe rainstorms could also cause sewers in Milwaukee and Chicago to overflow into Lake Michigan more often, which could pollute beaches in Michigan".

"One advantage of climate change is that warmer winters reduce the number of days that ice prevents navigation. Between 1994 and 2011, the decline in ice cover lengthened the shipping season on the Great Lakes by eight days. The lakes are likely to warm another 3° to 7°F in the next 70 years, which will further extend the shipping season".

=== Winter recreation ===
"Warmer winters are likely to shorten the season for recreational activities like ice fishing, snowmobiling, snowboarding, and skiing, which could harm the local economies that depend on them. Small lakes are freezing later and thawing earlier than a century ago, which shortens the season for ice fishing and ice skating and can cause those to become impossible or unsafe due to thin and unreliable ice coverage upon lakes especially in the extreme south of the state. Since the early 1970s, winter ice coverage in the Great Lakes has decreased by 63 percent. Warmer temperatures are likely to shorten the season when the ground is covered by snow, and thereby shorten the season for activities that take place on snow. Nevertheless, annual snowfall has increased in much of the Great Lakes region, which could benefit winter recreation at certain times and locations".

=== Ecosystem changes ===
"The ranges of plants and animals are likely to as the climate changes. For example, warmer weather could change the composition of Michigan’s forests. As the climate warms, the population of paper birch, quaking aspen, balsam fir, and black spruce may decline in the Upper Peninsula and northern Lower Peninsula, while oak, hickory, and pine trees may become more numerous. Climate change will also transform fish habitat. Rising water temperatures will increase the available habitat for warmwater fish such as bass, while shrinking the available habitat for coldwater fish such as trout. Declining ice cover and increasingly severe storms would harm both types of fish habitat through erosion and flooding. Warming could also harm ecosystems by changing the timing of natural processes such as migration, reproduction, and flower blooming".

"Migratory birds are arriving in the Midwest earlier in spring today than 40 years ago. Along with range shifts, changes in timing can disrupt the intricate web of relationships between animals and their food sources and between plants and pollinators. Because not all species adjust to climate change in the same way, the food that one species eats may no longer be available when that species needs it (for example, when migrating birds arrive). Some types of animals may no longer be able to find enough food".

=== Agriculture ===
"Changing the climate will have both beneficial and harmful effects on farming. Higher concentrations of atmospheric carbon dioxide and longer frost-free growing seasons would increase yields of wheat during an average year. But increasingly hot summers are likely to reduce yields of corn and possibly soybeans. Seventy years from now, Michigan’s Lower Peninsula is likely to have 5 to 15 more days per year with temperatures above 95°F than it has today. More severe droughts or floods would also hurt crop yields".

Warmer winters imply fewer blizzards that blanket the soil and protect soil moisture and, especially for the later ones, yield moisture timed well for germinating crops. This will be especially so in the southern part of the state that will be the first part of the state to enter the Cfa (humid subtropical climate) zone, which may happen by late in the 21st century. Winter rains will largely replace snow and typically flow away through rivers instead of recharging the groundwater.

== Climate justice ==
The impacts of climate change cause costly flooding, poor air quality, and deadly extreme heat. Climate justice focuses on the inequalities of climate impacts in relation to a community's contribution to the problem. Specifically, in Detroit, Michigan, many communities of color face the significant harm due to the impacts of climate change.

Many people of color historically live in older aging homes. In the event of a heat wave, people in older homes with no central air conditioning will face much higher indoor temperatures compared to someone living in a higher income neighborhood.

The Michigan Environmental Justice Coalition fights for equal access to renewable, affordable, and community-controlled energy, regardless of their race, social status, or politics. The organization works to end the inequalities may communities of color face in Michigan. They believe the main roots of climate change are racism, capitalism, and the hetero-patriarchy. They also believe the impact of these oppressive systems falls on low-income communities or communities of color.

== See also ==
- Plug-in electric vehicles in Michigan
