= Radha (disambiguation) =

Radha (or Radhika) is a Hindu goddess and eternal consort of Krishna.

Radha may also refer to:

- Radha Krishna, deity forms of Radha and Krishna worshiped in Vaishnavism
- Radha (novel), a 2005 novel by Krishna Dharabasi
- Radha (Mahabharata), the foster mother of Karna in the ancient Indian epic Mahabharata
- Radha (1973 film), a 1973 Indian film
- Radha (2017 film), a 2017 Indian film
- Radha (ballet) – a modern dance work by Ruth Saint Denis, music by Leo Delibes
- Radha, a 2019 Indian short animated film by Bimla Poddar, winner of the National Film Award for Best Non-Feature Animation Film
- Radha (Sholay), a fictional character played by Jaya Bhaduri in the classic 1975 Indian film Sholay
- "Radha" (song), a song from the 2012 Indian film Student of the Year
- Raḍha or Rarh, an historical region of India in West Bengal

== People ==
=== Film and television ===
- Radha (actress) (born 1965), Indian film actress
- Radha (Sundhara Travels actress), Indian actress, best known for the Tamil film Sundhara Travels
- Kumari Radha, South Indian film actress, teacher and sister of Kumari Kamala
- Radha Mitchell, Australian film actress
- Radha Bharadwaj, Indian filmmaker, producer and screenwriter

=== Politics ===
- Radha Poonoosamy (1924–2008), Mauritian politician, first women cabinet minister, and feminist activist
- Radha Raghavan (born 1961), Indian National Congress politician

=== Music ===
- Radha Cuadrado, Filipina singer
- Radha Jayalakshmi, Indian carnatic vocalist and playback singer

=== Others ===
- Radha Stirling, British-Indian activist and lawyer
- Radha Kessar, Indian mathematician
- Radha Vembu (born 1972/1973), Indian billionaire businesswoman, majority owner of Zoho Corporation

== See also ==
- Radhe (disambiguation)
- Radhe radhe (disambiguation)
- Radhika (disambiguation)
