= Radhika (given name) =

Radhika is an Indian female given name from the alternative name of Radha, Hindu goddess and eternal consort of Krishna.

== People ==
=== Film and television ===
- Radhika Sarathkumar, Indian actress, producer and entrepreneur
- Radhika Pandit, Indian film actress
- Radhika Chaudhari, Indian actress and director
- Radhika Rao, Indian film director
- Radhika Kumaraswamy, widely credited as Kutty Radhika, Indian film actress
- Radhika Apte (b. 1985), Indian film actress
- Radhika Madan (b. 1995), actress in Hindi films and television
- Radhika Narayan, actress in Kannada films and theatre
- Radhika (Malayalam actress), Indian film actress
- Radhika Sadanah better known by her stage name Roshini, actress in South Indian films
- Radhika Thilak (1969-2015), singer in Malayalam films
- Radhika (choreographer), choreographer in South Indian films
- Kalamandalam Radhika, Indian dancer and choreographer, and actor in Malayalam films and television
- Radikaa Sarathkumar, Indian actress

=== Politics ===
- V. Radhika Selvi (b. 1976), former Minister of State for home affairs and Member of 14th Lok Sabha from Tiruchendur
- Radhika Ranjan Gupta (died 1988), Chief Minister of Tripura, India
- Radhika Fox, American government official
- Radhika Vemula, Indian Dalit activist
- Radhika Balakrishnan, Indian-American women's right activist
- Radhika Coomaraswamy, Sri Lankan activist
- Radhika Tamang, Nepalese politician

=== Writing and journalism ===
- Radhika Herzberger (née Jayakar; b. 1938), Indian writer, educationist and Sanskrit scholar
- Radhika Jones (b. 1973), American magazine editor
- Radhika Menon, Indian publisher
- Radhika Sanghani, writer and journalist
- Radhika Iyengar, writer and journalist
- Radhika Gajjala (b. 1960), author, editor and professor
- Radhika Jha (b. 1970), Indian novelist

=== Business and industry ===
- Radhika Roy, Indian media baron
- Radhika Piramal, Indian business executive
- Radhika Aggarwal, internet entrepreneur

=== Sports ===
- A. Radhika Suresh, table-tennis player and Olympian
- Radhika Tulpule (b. 1982), former Indian tennis player
- Radhika Prasad, Fijian lawn bowler
- Radhika Hettiarachchi (b. 1977), Sri Lankan rugby union player and coach

=== Others ===
- Radhika Mohan Maitra (1917–1981), Indian sarod player
- Radhika Ramana Dasa, Vaishnava scholar
- Radhika Kulkarni (b. 1956), Indian American researcher
- Radhika Nagpal, Indian-American computer scientist and researcher
- Radhika Khanna (1974-2022), Indian-born American fashion designer, entrepreneur and author
- Radhika Vaz (b. 1973), Indian comedian and writer
- Radhika Menon (merchant navy officer)
- Radhika and Dudhika Nayak, conjoined twins

== See also ==
- Radhika Nair (disambiguation), several people
- Radka, female given name
