= Clean Water Rule =

2015 EPA regulation

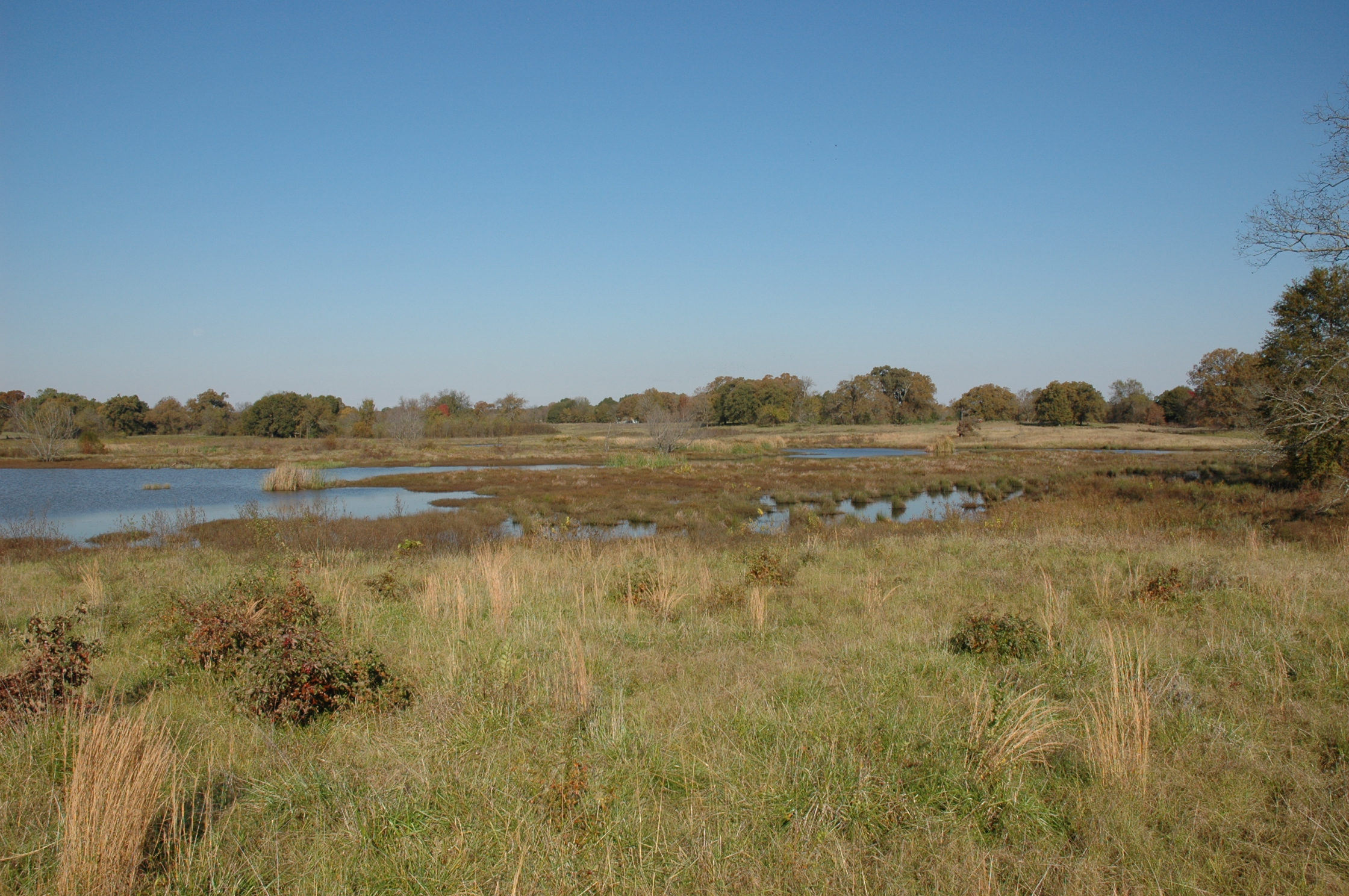
Protection of wetlands and small streams is a major focus of the Clean Water Rule

The Clean Water Rule is a 2015 regulation published by the United States Environmental Protection Agency (EPA) and the United States Army Corps of Engineers (USACE) to clarify water resource management in the United States under a provision of the Clean Water Act of 1972 (CWA). The regulation defined the scope of federal water protection in a more consistent manner, particularly over streams and wetlands which have a significant hydrological and ecological connection to traditional navigable waters, interstate waters, and territorial seas. It is also referred to as the Waters of the United States (WOTUS) rule, which defines all bodies of water that fall under U.S. federal jurisdiction. The rule was published in response to concerns about lack of clarity over the act's scope from legislators at multiple levels, industry members, researchers and other science professionals, activists, and citizens.

The rule was contested in litigation. In 2017 the Trump administration announced its intent to review and rescind or revise the rule. A Supreme Court ruling on January 22, 2018 returned the rule's nationwide authority after a lower court decided that the rule was illegal. It gave back jurisdiction previously complicated by decisions from the circuit courts of appeals. Two weeks later, the Trump administration formally suspended the rule until February 6, 2020. The Trump administration formally repealed the WOTUS rule on September 12, 2019 and published a replacement rule on April 21, 2020. On August 30, 2021, the United States District Court for the District of Arizona threw out the 2020 replacement rule.

USACE and EPA published a revised definition of WOTUS on January 18, 2023, restoring the pre-2015 regulations on the scope of federal jurisdiction over waterways, effective March 20, 2023. On May 25, 2023, the Supreme Court narrowed the scope of the rule in Sackett v. Environmental Protection Agency.

== Key provisions of the rescinded 2015 rule ==
The 2015 rule ensured that CWA programs were more precisely defined, with the intent of saving time and avoiding costs and confusion in future implementation of the act. The objective was to make it easier for interested parties to predict what action(s) would be taken by the EPA and what processes companies and other stakeholders would have to undergo for their projects and for permit issuance. There were no direct changes to the law under the Clean Water Rule. After analysis, the EPA and Department of the Army found that higher instance of water coverage would produce a 2:1 ratio of benefits to costs in implementation after the final rule. Implementation of the rule was to include the discerning of any implications for environmental justice communities. EPA and USACE had stated that "meaningful involvement from minority, low-income, and indigenous populations, as well as other stakeholders, has been a cornerstone of development of the final rule."

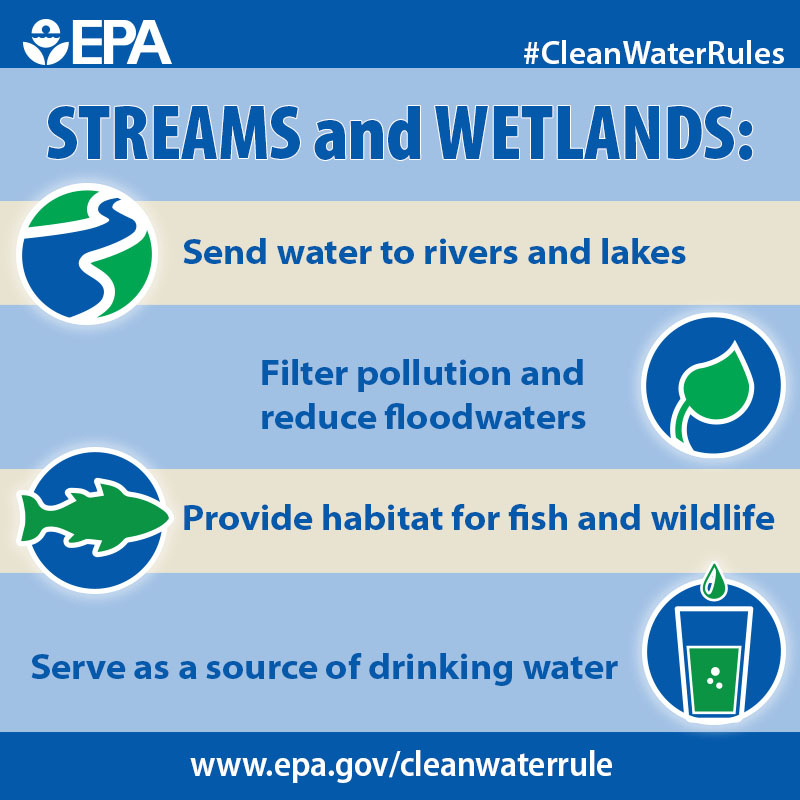
Infographic from the EPA, outlining the importance of extending coverage to wetlands and streams under the Clean Water Act.

Specific details that were clarified by the 2015 rule are outlined below.

- Defines more clearly the tributaries and adjacent waters that are under federal jurisdiction and explains how they are covered. A tributary, or upstream water, must show physical features of flowing water – a bed, bank, and ordinary high water mark – to warrant protection. The rule provides protection for headwaters that have these features and have a significant connection to downstream waters. Adjacent waters are defined by three qualifying circumstances established by the rule. These can include wetlands, ponds, impoundments, and lakes which can impact the chemical, biological or physical integrity of neighboring waters.
- Carries over existing exclusions from the Clean Water Act. All existing exclusions from longstanding agency practices are officially established for the first time. Waters used in normal agricultural, ranching, or silvicultural activities, as well as certain defined ditches, prior converted cropland, and waste treatment systems continue to be excluded.
- Reduces categories of waters which are subject to case-by-case analysis. Before the rule, almost any water could be put through an analysis that remained case-specific, even if it would not be covered under the CWA. The rule limits use of case-specific analysis by providing certainty and clarity of protected vs non-protected water. Ultimately the rule saves time and avoids further evaluation and the need to take the case to court.
- Protects US "regional water treasures." Specific watersheds have been shown to impact downstream water health. The rule protects Texas coastal prairie wetlands, coastal depressions called Carolina Bays and the related seasonal Delmarva bays, western vernal pools in California, pocosins, and other prairie potholes, when impacting downstream waterways.

== Defining "Waters of the United States" ==
The Clean Water Act is the primary federal law regulating water pollution in the United States. The language of the act describes itself as pertaining to "Waters of the United States". The act defines these waters as "navigable waterways", which connects the act to constitutional authority to regulate interstate commerce. Two Supreme Court decisions, in 2001 and 2006, interpreted the law to include waters not presently navigable, that were formerly navigable and that might be readily dredged to be restored to navigation, or be made available for navigation. The scope of these decisions cast into doubt lower court decisions interpreting the act's authority to extend regulatory authority to streams, wetlands, and small bodies of water not navigable in the sense of the interstate commerce clause. These decisions highlighted a need for the EPA and USACE to more precisely define and justify an implicit regulatory authority over tributaries flowing into the navigable waterways for which a clear statutory authority is provided.

=== Solid Waste Agency of Northern Cook County (SWANCC) v. U.S. Army Corps of Engineers ===
The Solid Waste Agency of Northern Cook County (SWANCC), Illinois, was denied federal permits to develop an old gravel mine site into a landfill because migratory bird ponds had developed in abandoned excavation trenches on the property. The Supreme Court ruled in 2001 that the authority granted by CWA did not extend to abandoned gravel pits with seasonal ponds.

=== Rapanos v. United States ===
In 1989, land developer John Rapanos filled twenty-two acres (nine hectares) on his property some 10–20 miles from the nearest navigable waters that his environmental consultant had classified as wetlands without a permit from the Michigan Department of Environmental Quality. Rapanos v. United States resulted in a 2006 Supreme Court decision with five justices concurring to vacate rulings against the defendants, but issuing three distinctly differing opinions, leaving uncertain which of the described tests defined the limit of the federal authority to regulate wetlands. The resulting ambiguity became a part of the stated rationale for EPA rulemaking activity that resulted in the 2015 WOTUS rule.

== Development ==
Following the SWANCC ruling, the EPA (then under the George W. Bush administration) issued guidelines in 2003 restricting regulatory review of some 20 million acres of isolated wetlands and gave advance notice of proposed rulemaking which would substantially narrow the scope of WOTUS and weaken CWA protections. After strong opposition from Congress the planned legislation was abandoned, to the relief of environmental advocates and disappointment of land development groups who sought a reduction in federal wetlands protection.

The lack of a majority opinion in the 2006 Rapanos case prompted a second set of EPA guidelines directing the agency to determine wetlands protection on a case-by-case basis. This contributed to an uptick in lawsuits for the next 8 years challenging the EPA's regulatory authority over streams and wetlands. Seeking to reduce confusion and to restore the original scope of WOTUS to pre-SWANCC levels, repeated unsuccessful attempts were made to pass a bill called the "Clean Water Authority Restoration Act" in each Congress from 2002 to 2010.

In April 2011, the EPA, under the Barack Obama administration, proposed a new set of guidelines to replace the two issued under the Bush administration. These guidelines formed the basis of what became the Clean Water Rule. In contrast to the manner in which the 2003 and 2007 guidelines were issued, the EPA and the USACE conducted peer-reviewed hydrological studies, interagency reviews, and economic analyses before publishing a formal proposed rule on April 21, 2014.

On May 27, 2015, after a public comment period and numerous meetings with state entities, public and private stakeholders, then-EPA Administrator Gina McCarthy along with Assistant Army Secretary Jo-Ellen Darcy signed the Clean Water Rule, set to become effective in August of that year.

== Implications for stakeholders ==
EPA had stated that the 2015 rule created no additional burden for stakeholders working in agriculture since there was no change to the exemptions for activities necessary to forestry, ranching, or farming. The rule provided clearer protection of many waters of the U.S. that, if polluted, could have detrimental effects on drinking water, habitats, and flood-prone areas. One U.S. water news organization stressed that, while the rule was an update to the CWA, there is still a need for more regulation since more than half of the nation's streams and rivers do not meet standards and most pollution issues come from nonpoint sources, such as agricultural runoff. Many people, 117 million according to EPA, rely on drinking water, in addition to many others who subside on fishing, from sources protected under the implementation of the rule.

Low-income communities and communities of color are more often at risk of being affected by pollution. It has also been evidenced that, "states conduct fewer regulatory enforcement actions in counties with higher levels of poverty." The Environmental Justice Coalition for Water expressed, in its comment on the rule, the need to "strengthen the categorical protections" to wetlands, to minimize flooding and support pollution remediation.

While there are no direct implications for indigenous peoples, tribal communities were consulted during the process of finalizing the Clean Water Rule. A separate, revised interpretive rule under CWA section 518 stated that tribal lands should be treated as states and was made effective in May 2016. This amendment is important for giving people living on reservations access to EPA regulation and federal grants; tribes no longer need to "demonstrate inherent authority to regulate" their waters.

The regulation at the state level is determined by the strength of federal coverage and some stakeholders consider the rule to be overreach by the government. There is concern from private landowners, including small business owners and farmers, that this "rule will lead to radical environmental groups suing homeowners and small businesses," and, ultimately, "increased regulatory costs, less economic development, fewer jobs."

== Legal challenges and opposition ==
=== Partisan and industry opposition ===
Government regulation and protection of fresh water supplies and watershed health is frequently perceived on the political right as a burden on economic growth and an infringement of landowner rights. The Clean Water Rule was part of a larger mobilization by the Obama administration to ingrain the presidency with an environmental legacy, which Republicans have viewed as an “over-reach” of executive power.

The pushback against the Clean Water Rule also include some Democrats from so-called "farm and energy states". Some state and local governments also consider the Clean Water Rule an unconstitutional over-reach violating federalism principles and due process provisions outlined in the 10th and 14th amendments respectively. Legal objections could also be raised on the principle that the Clean Water Act itself violates the Commerce Clause of the Constitution.

On February 22, 2017, the Business Roundtable provided a list of federal regulations to the Trump administration which it wished to have reviewed for repeal or major reform; the Clean Water Rule was among the "wishlist" of sixteen. The roundtable is a consortium of large corporations including J.P. Morgan Chase, Honeywell, Lockheed Martin, and Dow Chemical Company.

=== Federal stay ===
After thirteen states sued to block the rule, U.S. Chief District Judge for North Dakota Ralph R. Erickson issued a preliminary injunction in 2015, hours before the rule was to take effect, blocking regulation in those states. In a separate case, the Sixth Circuit Court temporarily halted implementation of the 2015 Rule by issuing a nationwide stay on October 9, 2015, which was the day before the rule was supposed to come into effect. The Sixth Circuit's decision was overturned on January 22, 2018 when the Supreme Court issued a unanimous decision that the appeals courts do not have original jurisdiction to review challenges to the CWA and, therefore, lack the authority to issue a stay. Rather, challenges to the 2015 rule must be filed in United States district courts.

== Trump administration ==
Donald Trump, as part of his 2016 presidential campaign had set a goal of repealing or weakening the WOTUS rule, and once in office, began to act on that pledge, stating that the rule was a "massive power grab" by the government on farmers, home owners, and land commissioners, stalling economic growth. On February 28, 2017 Trump signed an executive order directing EPA to review the Clean Water Rule for conflicts with his economic growth agenda. On March 6, 2017 the Trump administration announced its intent to review and rescind or revise the rule. The Trump administration's choice for the EPA water chief, David Ross, had represented the state of Wyoming in 2015 in a lawsuit against EPA's interpretation of WOTUS.

On February 16, 2017 Trump signed a law disapproving and vacating the Stream Protection Rule. The rule, published by the Office of Surface Mining Reclamation and Enforcement on December 20, 2016 with just 31 days left in the Obama Administration's term of office, regulated mountaintop removal mining sites. In January 2018 EPA formally suspended the 2015 WOTUS regulation and announced plans to issue a new version later in 2018. Fifteen states, two cities and several environmental organizations have challenged EPA's suspension in several lawsuits.

EPA and USACE published a proposed rule on February 14, 2019 that would revise the WOTUS definition. The Trump administration formally announced that the WOTUS rule had been repealed on September 12, 2019, to take effect within weeks. A replacement rule for the Clean Water Rule was issued by the Trump administration on January 23, 2020 (published April 21, 2020), which further rolled back protection on certain wetlands and streams and eliminated requirements for landowners to get EPA approval for certain modification of their own lands. The Natural Resources Defense Council and other environmental groups sued to block the new rule.

On August 30, 2021, the United States District Court for the District of Arizona threw out the 2020 replacement rule in Pasqua Yaqui Tribe et al v. EPA. The court stated that EPA made serious procedural errors in its issuance of the 2020 rule and that implementation of the rule would lead to "serious environmental harm."

== Biden administration ==
In June 2021 the administration of President Joe Biden described "significant environmental degradation" from hundreds of recently-initiated development projects that were not subject to regulatory approval because of the 2019 repeal. In an announcement EPA said it planned initiate a new rulemaking to reverse the 2019/2020 rule and restore the 2015 regulation widening the scope of federal jurisdiction over waterways. USACE and EPA published a new definition of WOTUS, returning to the definition in the pre-2015 regulations, on January 18, 2023. The rule took effect on March 20, 2023. On May 25, 2023 the Supreme Court rolled back the restored policy in Sackett v. Environmental Protection Agency, ruling that only wetlands and permanent bodies of water with a "continuous surface connection" to "traditional interstate navigable waters" are covered by the Clean Water Act.

== Updated definition ==
EPA and the Army published a proposed rule, which would implement the 2023 Sackett decision, on November 20, 2025.

== See also ==
- Environmental policy of the United States
- Indigenous rights to land along rivers
- Inland waterways of the United States
