= David Ross (lawyer) =

American lawyer

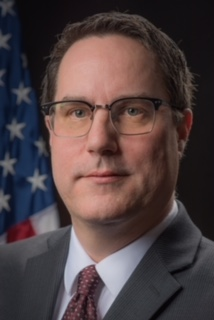
- Official portrait, 2018

Assistant Administrator of the Environmental Protection Agency for the Office of Water
- In office January 22, 2018 – January 20, 2021
- President: Donald Trump
- Preceded by: Joel Beauvais
- Succeeded by: Radhika Fox

Personal details
- Education: Vermont Law School (BA); University of Wisconsin-Madison (MA, JD)

David Patrick Ross is an American environmental and land-use lawyer who served as the Assistant Administrator of the Environmental Protection Agency (Office of Water) from 2018 to 2021. Prior to his EPA role, he was a Wisconsin assistant attorney general and director of the state's environmental-protection judicial unit.

== Career ==
Ross began his career as an environmental consultant. He returned to law school, after which he was employed by a series of Washington D.C.–based law firms before moving to public service in Wyoming in 2014 and Wisconsin in 2016.

Ross represented the state of Wyoming in a lawsuit against the Environmental Protection Agency in 2015. At issue was the definition of Waters of the United States, which determines whether the federal agency or the state would set rules for waters in the various states. The states won an injunction. The Sixth Circuit Court of Appeals reversed the injunction, finding for the EPA and the Army Corps of Engineers in 2016. The case, now styled National Association of Manufacturers v. Department of Defense, was heard by the Supreme Court in October 2017.

Ross was nominated for the post of Assistant Administrator of the Environmental Protection Agency (Office of Water) on September 2, 2017. Ross' nomination was received in the Senate and referred to the Committee on Environment and Public Works on September 5, 2017. John Barrasso (R-WY) is chairman of the committee. His hearing before the Environment and Public Works committee took place October 4, 2017. The United States Senate Committee on Environment and Public Works was scheduled to vote on his confirmation on October 18, 2017, but that vote was postponed until October 24. The committee voted to advance his nomination 11–10, split along party lines. Ross was confirmed by a voice vote of the full U.S. Senate on December 14, 2017.
