= Radhe =

Radhe is the vocative case of Radha, a Hindu goddess who is the consort of Krishna.

It may also refer to:

- Radhe family, a Swedish family
- Radhe (2017 film), a Nepalese film
- Radhe (2021 film), an Indian Hindi film
- Radhe (upcoming film), an Indian Bhojpuri film

== See also ==
- Radhe Radhe (disambiguation)
- Radha (disambiguation)
