= Stream Protection Rule =

Repealed United States federal regulation

The Stream Protection Rule was a United States federal regulation issued by the Office of Surface Mining Reclamation and Enforcement that went into effect on January 19, 2017. These regulations implement Title V of the 1977 Surface Mining Control and Reclamation Act (SMCRA). The original regulations had been issued in 1979 and were updated in 1983. Litigation over mountaintop removal mining required changes to the regulations, which were issued in 2008. These regulations were in turn struck down by a judge after litigation by environmental groups. The new regulations, the Stream Protection Rule, were issued in January 2017.

They were a topic in the 2016 elections, with Republican candidates for federal office saying that they would strike the regulations down if they would be elected. In February 2017, the Republican-controlled Congress, through the Congressional Review Act, passed a bill (a "resolution of disapproval") to revoke the rule. President Donald Trump signed the legislation, repealing the rule. This left the status of regulations implementing the SMCRA unclear.

== History ==
The Stream Protection Rule updated the regulations issued by the Office of Surface Mining Reclamation and Enforcement (OSMRE) to implement Title V of the 1977 Surface Mining Control and Reclamation Act (SMCRA), the focus of which were the conditions for issuing permits to begin a mining operation. The regulations had been issued in 1979, updated in 1983, and litigation over mountaintop removal mining required changes to the regulations, which were issued in 2008. Environmental groups challenged the new rules in court and in 2014 a federal court struck them down, and the Obama administration began working on new rules.

In a joint hearing in December 2015, by the House Committee on Oversight and Government Reform and Subcommittee on the Interior, U.S. Representative Brenda Lawrence stated in the reasoning to the Stream Protection Rule that previous rules were not developed with current science and have failed to prevent environmental harm. Current evidence has linked coal mining with loss in stream water quality and ecosystem health. State regulatory agencies have rarely enacted policy to regulate impact on streams outside of mining sites.

In July 2015 as part of the development of the new rules, OSMRE published a draft Environmental Impact Statement about the new rules. Pursuant to Executive Order 12898 issued by Bill Clinton, which required federal agencies to take environmental justice (EJ) concerns into consideration when taking regulatory and other actions, and pursuant to the EPA's own guidelines for implementing that order finalized in 1998, the impact statement had a section addressing EJ concerns. The EPA studied the demographics of 286 coal-producing counties and identified 44 that had significant minority or low-income populations; half of those were in Appalachia. The statement predicted that the rules would probably lead to a decrease in coal production, which would lead to a loss of jobs and with respect to minority-owned coal producers (e.g. Native American tribes) this would be a negative socio-economic effect. The Statement also offered predictions on the likely effects on public health and safety; biological resources, water resources, and air quality; topography and land use; and recreation in minority and low-income counties, and found that there were likely to be negligible to very beneficial effects in each of those aspects. The statement also addressed protections for cemeteries and sacred lands on tribal lands.

The revised rules, which became known as the Stream Protection Rule, were published on December 20, 2016 by the Office of Surface Mining Reclamation and Enforcement, of the United States Department of the Interior. and became effective on January 19, 2017.

Part of the work that led to the new rules was a collaboration with the United States Fish and Wildlife Service; the ESA requires federal agencies to consult with the Fish and Wildlife Service to ensure their actions do not jeopardize the continued existence of an endangered or threatened species, or adversely modify critical habitat. The Fish and Wildlife Service published its Programmatic Biological Opinion, and both agencies published a Memorandum of Understanding that described how OSMRE was implementing the findings of the Opinion, on the same day the new rules were published.

== Provisions ==
Following the law being implemented, the Stream Protection Rule aimed to create "balance between environmental protection and the nation's need for coal as a source of energy." To achieve this, the rule included improvements in the protection of water supplies, water quality, streams, fish and other wildlife, and other environmental issues that are harmed by surface coal mining; furthermore, the rule provided mine operators with more regulations that would help avoid water pollution as well as water treatment costs. In addition to these guidelines, the rule also included eradicating water pollution outside of permit areas, requiring thorough data collection for mining operations, protection and restoration of streams, updated guidelines for protecting endangered species, and long-term treatment of unintentional water contamination. Expanding on permits, the rule also guarantees that science and technology are leveraged to analyze the potential harms of mining. It also ensured that lands that are harmed by mining operations can be restored to a condition comparable to its condition before the mining operation was introduced. During the restoration process companies would be required to plant native trees and vegetation. 30% of the rule's provisions were revisions and organizational changes that aimed to help "improve consistency, clarity, accuracy, and ease of use."

Assistant Secretary for Land and Minerals Management, Hon. Janice Schneider testified before a joint House committee hearing stating "Every reclamation practice contained in the proposed rule has been successfully implemented by a mine operator somewhere in the country." and that the rule was based on industry best practice.

The Stream Protection Rule covered waterways near surface coal mining operations in order to avoid pollution of rivers and streams, and also called for the restoration of streams that had been damaged by dangerous, heavy metals like mercury and arsenic. The Rule would have protected an estimated 6,000 miles of streams over the next two decades, by establishing that coal companies were in fact, not allowed to damage the "hydrologic balance" outside their permit area and enforcing a 100-foot buffer around streams to preserve native species. The Interior Department had also said that the rule would protect 52,000 acres of forests as a default of keeping coal mining debris away from nearby waters.

== Expected effects and impacts ==
On January 11, 2017, a report for members and committees of Congress was published by the Congressional Research Service, entitled "The Office of Surface Mining's Stream Protection Rule: An Overview." The report described the history of law, regulation, and litigation that had led to the new rules. The report also summarized a report, Draft Regulatory Impact Analysis of the Stream Protection Rule, that was prepared for the Interior Department's Office of Surface Mining Reclamation and Enforcement. That draft regulatory impact analysis (RIA) outlined the costs of the new rules to the coal mining industry, and provided an overall cost-benefit analysis of the rules. The draft RIA found that "added administrative costs resulting from the rule are expected to be small for industry, adding on average about $0.01 per ton of coal mined", although cost in Appalachia would be expected to be up to $0.04 per ton. Cost for small operators were expected to be higher. The draft RIA cites SMCRA Section 507(c) to assist these operators. The draft RIA expected administrative cost for government to range from $1,830 to $2,546 per mine depending on the region. The draft RIA found that under the proposed rule, coal production would "decrease in aggregate by about 1.9 million tons annually, or approximately 0.2% compared with production expected under the baseline," reflecting mainly substitution of natural gas for coal by U.S. power plants.

The draft RIA also found that the rule would "reduce adverse impacts on the environment and human heath" and that the rule's stream restoration and reforestation provisions would result in an estimated "2,811 acres of forest improved annually and 20 acres of forest preserved annually."

== Challenges and overturning ==
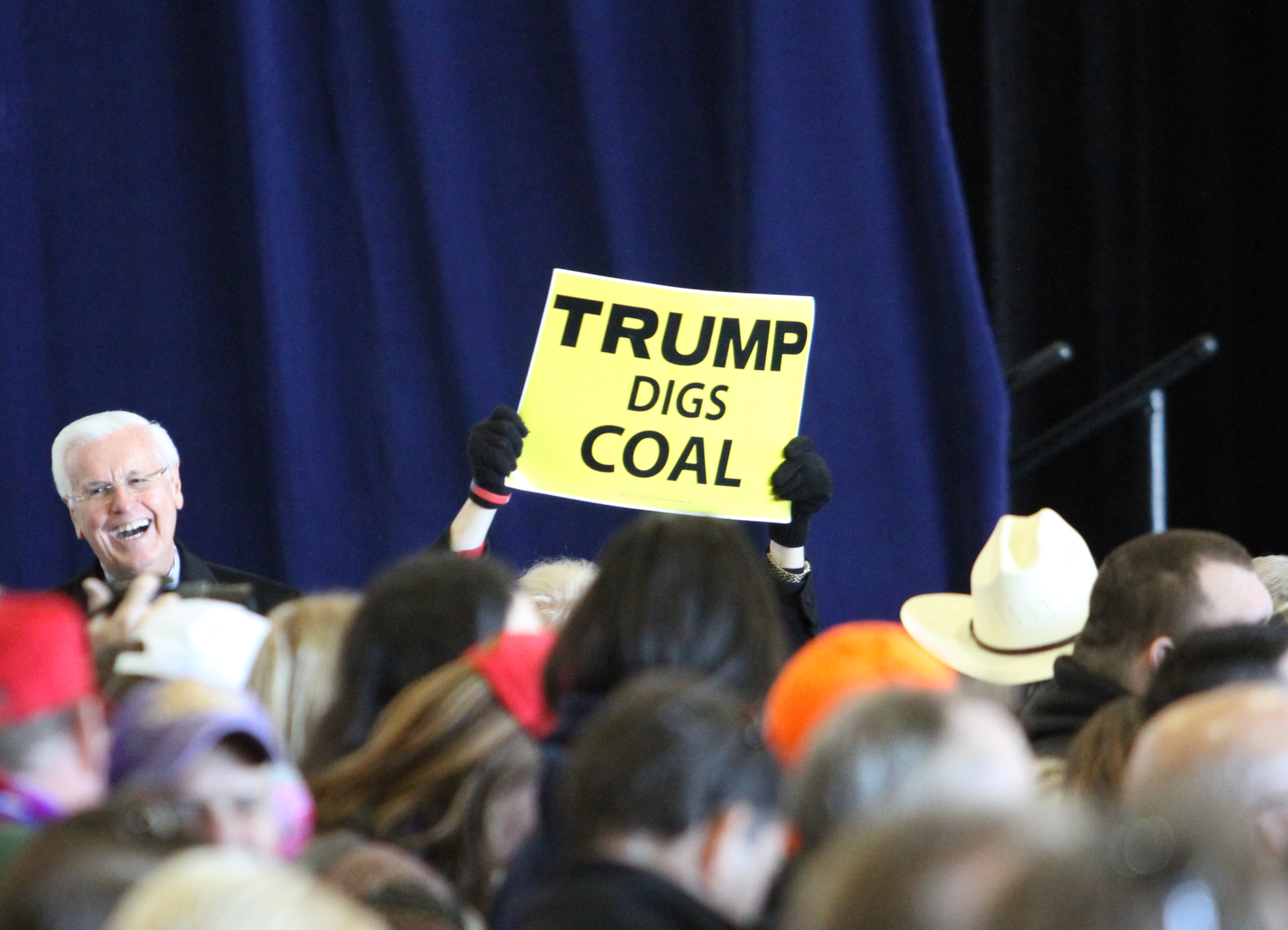
President-elect Trump's pro-coal mining stances promoted during a Republican campaign rally in Louisiana.

Republicans, including Donald Trump, had made reducing regulation, and especially environmental regulation, a key message in their campaigns in 2016, and Paul Ryan had issued a plan called "Better Way" that laid out methods to reduce regulation, including use of the Congressional Review Act, which allows Congress and the President to force federal agencies to retract regulations that they judge go beyond what the law requires. Senate Majority Leader Mitch McConnell had also claimed that the rule would decrease the number of coal-related jobs.

When the Stream Protection Rule was published, it was immediately challenged in court by the Republican state attorneys general of several states, as well as the coal mining company Murray Energy. The states challenging the bill were Alabama, Alaska, Arkansas, Colorado, Indiana, Kentucky, Missouri, Montana, Texas, Utah, West Virginia and Wyoming, all of which are coal-mining states.

When the new Congress met in 2017, controlled by Republicans in both houses, a coalition made up of 124 organizations, including Greenpeace, the National Women's Law Center, the Center for Biological Diversity and the AFL–CIO, sent an open letter urging Congress not to overturn the Rule.

In early February 2017, Congress voted to use the Congressional Review Act to pass a "resolution of disapproval" to revoke the Stream Protection Rule. The resolution to repeal the bill passed in the House by a 228–194 vote and in the Senate by a vote of 54–45, largely on party lines, with Republicans voting in favor and Democrats voting against. According to the Center for American Progress, the 27 representatives that sponsored or co-sponsored the review of the rules received nearly $500 million from mining interests in 2016. Trump signed H.J. Res 38 on February 16, 2017, overturning the Stream Protection Rule.

When he signed the resolution repealing the rule, Trump predicted that striking down the rule would save thousands of U.S. mining-related jobs. Republican Bill Johnson, the U.S. representative for Ohio's 6th congressional district and sponsor for the disapproval measure, stated, "Make no mistake about it, this Obama administration rule is not designed to protect streams. Instead, it was an effort to regulate the coal mining industry right out of business."

== Effects of revocation ==
Subsequent to the revocation of the Stream Protection Rule by the Trump administration, many scientists, when interviewed, said that it would have had an insignificant impact on the activities of coal companies.

Moreover, the US energy industry had generally reduced its use of coal in favor of cheaper natural gas and to a lesser extent renewables, and analysts said that even if the Stream Protection Rule had made coal more expensive for them, it would not have had much of an effect on the industry; its revocation meant little to them as well.

The revocation of these regulations hindered the existence of several endangered or critically limited species, like the hellbender.

== See also ==
- Clean Water Act
- Clean Water Rule
- Plant Protection Act
- Waters of the United States
- Drinking water supply and sanitation in the United States
