= Congressional Review Act =

United States legislation enabling Congress to override federal agency decisions

- Long title: An Act to provide for the review of Federal regulations by the Congress, and for other purposes.
- Enacted by: the 104th United States Congress

Citations
- Public law: Pub. L. 104-121, title II, subtitle E
- Statutes at Large: 110 Stat. 868

Legislative history
- Introduced in the Senate as S. 942 by Kit Bond (R–MO) on June 16, 1995; Signed into law by President Bill Clinton on March 29, 1996

The Congressional Review Act (CRA) is a law that was enacted by the United States Congress as subtitle E of the Contract with America Advancement Act of 1996 and signed into law by President Bill Clinton on March 29, 1996. The law empowers Congress to review, by means of an expedited legislative process, new federal regulations issued by government agencies and, by passage of a joint resolution, to overrule a regulation. Once a rule is thus repealed, the CRA also prohibits the reissuing of the rule in substantially the same form or the issuing of a new rule that is substantially the same "unless the reissued or new rule is specifically authorized by a law enacted after the date of the joint resolution disapproving the original rule." Congress has a window of time lasting 60 session days to disapprove of any given rule by simple-majority vote; otherwise, the rule will go into effect at the end of that period.

Before 2017, Congress successfully invoked the CRA only once to overturn a rule (in 2001). In January 2017, with a new Republican president, Donald Trump, the Republican-controlled 115th Congress began passing a series of disapproval resolutions to overturn a variety of rules issued under the Obama administration. Ultimately, 14 such resolutions repealing Obama administration rules were passed and signed into law; a fifteenth resolution was passed by the House but failed in the Senate. Because of the shortness of legislative sessions during the 114th Congress, the 115th Congress was able to target rules issued by the Obama administration as far back as June 2016.

== Procedure ==
Use of the Congressional Review Act has increased because the Act provides special, fast-track parliamentary procedures that make it easier for Congress to pass a joint resolution of disapproval, particularly in the Senate, where a qualifying joint resolution cannot be filibustered.

The Act requires that before a rule can take effect, the agency promulgating the rule must submit a report (containing the rule, a concise general statement of the rule, and the rule’s proposed effective date) to each House of Congress and the Comptroller General. Each House then sends copies of the report to the Chairs and Ranking Members of committees with jurisdiction and prints notices of the report in the Congressional Record as executive communications.

The Act makes special procedures available for 60 days. In interpreting the starting date for that period, the House of Representatives focuses on the date that it received the report, while the Senate focuses on the date that the notice is published in the Congressional Record and the report is referred to committee. The later of either of those dates or the date on which the rule is published in the Federal Register (if the agency published rule there) then becomes the starting date for a period of 60 session days thereafter during which the Act's special parliamentary procedures apply. If the agency fails to publish the rule in the Federal Register and the Government Accountability Office (GAO) determines that it is nonetheless a rule (as described below), then the starting date is the date on which a Senator publishes the GAO decision in the Congressional Record.

To qualify for expedited consideration in the Senate, a joint resolution of disapproval may not be introduced before the starting date. And a joint resolution of disapproval introduced after the 60 day period ends does not qualify for the Act's special procedures. The 60 day period counts calendar days, "excluding days either House of Congress is adjourned for more than 3 days during a session of Congress."

The joint resolution of disapproval must use only the words, “That Congress disapproves the rule submitted by the ____ relating to ____, and such rule shall have no force or effect,” where the first blank is filled in with the agency and the second blank is filled with the title of the rule and either the Federal Register citation (if the agency published it there) or the Congressional Record citation (if GAO determined it to be a rule).

In the Senate, beginning 21 calendar days after the starting date, Senators can discharge the resolution with a petition signed by 30 Senators (if the committee to which a joint resolution was referred has not already reported the resolution or an identical resolution). The joint resolution is then placed on the calendar. Note that 21 or more days after the starting date, a Senator can submit the joint resolution and discharge it immediately, even before the committee has any opportunity to act.

Once the joint resolution has been placed on the calendar, any Senator can make a nondebatable, unamendable motion to proceed to the joint resolution. A Senator cannot make such a motion, however, if the Senate has invoked cloture or if another privileged motion to proceed is pending or if the Senate is in executive session. But it is in order to proceed to the consideration of a joint resolution of disapproval while a motion to proceed to a non-privileged matter is pending.

Once the Senate agrees to the motion to proceed, the joint resolution remains the Senate’s unfinished business until the Senate disposed of it. The Act limits debate on the joint resolution (and on all motions and appeals) to 10 hours, equally divided equally between those favoring and those opposing the resolution. This ensures that a simple majority vote will decide the matter. Any Senator can make a nondebatable motion to further limit debate. The law does not allow amendments or motions to recommit. By precedent, Senators may raise points of order. The Senate decides appeals from decisions of the Presiding Officer without debate. Immediately after the conclusion of the debate (and a single quorum call if requested), the Senate votes on final passage of the joint resolution.

In the Senate, these special procedures cease after 60 session days after the starting date. The House, however, can act on a joint resolution at any time during the 2-year Congress.

If Congress adjourns for the 2-year Congress within 60 days of session in the Senate or 60 legislative days in the House after Congress receives a rule, then the 60-day period for special procedures begins anew in the next Congress on the 15th day of session in the Senate and the 15th legislative day in the House. Some call this the “lookback” process. As a joint resolution requires Presidential agreement or a veto override to become law, this lookback process is particularly important at the beginning of a Presidency of a different party from the previous President.

== GAO's role ==
The law gives the Government Accountability Office (GAO), headed by the Comptroller General, a role in policing the statute.

- The law requires that "Before a rule can take effect, the Federal agency promulgating such rule shall submit to each House of the Congress and to the Comptroller General a report . . . ."
- The law requires that "On the date of the submission of the report . . . , the Federal agency promulgating the rule shall submit to the Comptroller General” further analysis, accounts of agency actions, and “any other relevant information or requirements under any other Act and any relevant Executive orders."
- The law requires that "The Comptroller General shall provide a report on each major rule to the committees of jurisdiction in each House of the Congress by the end of 15 calendar days after the submission or publication date . . . . The report of the Comptroller General shall include an assessment of the agency’s compliance with procedural steps required . . . ."
- The statute requires that “Federal agencies shall cooperate with the Comptroller General by providing information relevant to the Comptroller General’s report . . . ."

Pursuant to this statutory authorization, since Congress enacted the law in 1996, GAO has regularly evaluated whether administrative actions constitute "rules" under the law. This practice began when, on August 27, 1996, Senator Larry Craig, then Chairman of the Subcommittee on Forests and Public Lands Management of the Committee on Energy and Natural Resources, asked for GAO's views on whether a July 2 memorandum issued by the Secretary of Agriculture concerning the Emergency Salvage Timber Sale Program was a "rule" under the CRA.

When an agency does not submit an action as a rule under the law and GAO then determines that the agency's action is a "rule" under the law, the Senate Parliamentarian gives effect to GAO's position.

Before 2025, when GAO decided that an agency action was not a rule, the Senate did not consider any joint resolution of disapproval of any of those agency actions. In March 2025, the Congressional Research Service reviewed GAO legal opinions regarding the law and related action on joint resolutions of disapproval and found no instances of Congressional action after GAO decided that an agency action was not a rule. Notably, in 2014, Leader Mitch McConnell and 41 cosponsors introduced a joint resolution of disapproval of an Environmental Protection Agency action regarding Electrical Utility Generating Units, but GAO subsequently determined that the agency action was not a rule subject to the CRA. Senator McConnell and his cosponsors apparently deferred to that decision and did not attempt to advance the disapproval.

In 2025, for the first time, GAO found that an action submitted by an agency under the CRA was not a rule. The matter arose out of three waivers of Federal preemption under Clean Air Act section 209. Previously, on February 9, 2023, GAO had found that such waiver decisions were not rules within the meaning of the CRA. The Biden administration Environmental Protection Agency published one of those decisions on April 6, 2023, and two others on January 5, 2025, but "EPA did not submit CRA reports to Congress or GAO for any of the Notices of Decision when they were initially issued." On February 19, 2025, the Trump administration Environmental Protection Agency submitted those three preemption waiver decisions to Congress and the GAO pursuant to the CRA. On February 21, 2025, Senators Sheldon Whitehouse, Alex Padilla, and Adam Schiff wrote the Comptroller General asking GAO for a legal decision as to whether the Environmental Protection Agency's Clean Air Act submissions were rules subject to the Congressional Review Act. Following its 2023 decision, on March 6, 2025, GAO found that the submissions were not rules. On March 27, 2025, the Environmental Protection Agency resubmitted the same three agency actions to Congress. Republican and Democratic staff argued before the Senate Parliamentarian about whether she agreed with GAO’s finding, and on April 4, 2025, she advised that the waivers at issue did not qualify for expedited consideration under the Congressional Review Act. To preserve the ability to use the CRA regarding these waivers, Majority Leader John Thune raised a point of order that "joint resolutions that meet all the requirements of section 802 of the Congressional Review Act or are disapproving of Agency actions which have been determined to be rules subject to the CRA by a legal decision from GAO are entitled to expedited procedures under the Congressional Review Act"—implicitly that the Senate would not honor any GAO decision that an agency action was not a rule under the CRA. The Presiding Officer (Senator Shelley Moore Capito, then Chair of the Environment and Public Works Committee) replied: "In the opinion of the Chair, the Senate has not previously considered this question. Therefore, the Chair, under the provisions of rule XX, submits the question to the Senate for its decision." The Senate voted 51 to 46 to sustain the point of order, creating a Senate precedent that any matter submitted by an agency as a rule under the CRA or determined to be a rule by GAO would be entitled to expedited procedures under the Congressional Review Act. Senate Democrats accused the Republican majority of exercising the nuclear option—overriding a rule with a simple majority—in so doing, but Republican Senators denied the charge.

== Use ==
Despite its passage in 1996, the Congressional Review Act was not used to send any resolutions of disapproval to the President's desk during the remainder of the Clinton administration. President George W. Bush signed the only resolution of disapproval sent to him by Congress. Congress passed five resolutions of disapproval during the presidency of Barack Obama, but he vetoed all of them.

In the first four months of his term, President Donald Trump signed 14 resolutions of disapproval into law. At the White House, Andrew Bremberg, Marc Short, and Rick Dearborn coordinated with aides of Leader Mitch McConnell to use the CRA, creating an Excel spreadsheet of target regulations, eventually being able to eliminate over twice as many as they had anticipated. The later enactment in November 2017 of H.J. Res. 111 was notable for being the first time that a president signed a CRA resolution against a regulation issued during his own administration.

=== Successful uses ===
The following is a complete list of successful uses of the CRA, as of May 9, 2025:

Public Law	Date Enacted	Resolution	Title	Actions
Pub. L. 107–5 (text) (PDF)	March 20, 2001	S.J.Res. 6	Providing for congressional disapproval of the rule submitted by the Department of Labor under chapter 8 of title 5, United States Code, relating to ergonomics	passed Senate 56–44 on March 6, 2001 passed House 223–206 on March 7, 2001 signed by Bush on March 20, 2001
Pub. L. 115–4 (text) (PDF)	February 14, 2017	H.J.Res. 41	Providing for congressional disapproval under chapter 8 of title 5, United States Code, of a rule submitted by the Securities and Exchange Commission relating to "Disclosure of Payments by Resource Extraction Issuers"	passed House 235–187 on February 1, 2017 passed Senate 52–47 on February 3, 2017 signed by Trump on February 14, 2017
Pub. L. 115–5 (text) (PDF)	February 16, 2017	H.J.Res. 38	Disapproving the rule submitted by the Department of the Interior known as the "Stream Protection Rule"	passed House 228–194 on February 1, 2017 passed Senate 54–45 on February 2, 2017 signed by Trump on February 16, 2017
Pub. L. 115–8 (text) (PDF)	February 28, 2017	H.J.Res. 40	Providing for congressional disapproval under chapter 8 of title 5, United States Code, of the rule submitted by the Social Security Administration relating to Implementation of the NICS Improvement Amendments Act of 2007	passed House 235–180 on February 2, 2017 passed Senate 57–43 on February 15, 2017 signed by Trump on February 28, 2017
Pub. L. 115–11 (text) (PDF)	March 27, 2017	H.J.Res. 37	Disapproving the rule submitted by the Department of Defense, the General Services Administration, and the National Aeronautics and Space Administration relating to the Federal Acquisition Regulation	passed House 236–187 on February 2, 2017 passed Senate 49–48 on March 6, 2017 signed by Trump on March 27, 2017
Pub. L. 115–12 (text) (PDF)	March 27, 2017	H.J.Res. 44	Disapproving the rule submitted by the Department of the Interior relating to Bureau of Land Management regulations that establish the procedures used to prepare, revise, or amend land use plans pursuant to the Federal Land Policy and Management Act of 1976	passed House 234–186 on February 7, 2017 passed Senate 51–48 on March 7, 2017 signed by Trump on March 27, 2017
Pub. L. 115–13 (text) (PDF)	March 27, 2017	H.J.Res. 57	Providing for congressional disapproval under chapter 8 of title 5, United States Code, of the rule submitted by the Department of Education relating to accountability and State plans under the Elementary and Secondary Education Act of 1965	passed House 234–190 on February 7, 2017 passed Senate 50–49 on March 9, 2017 signed by Trump on March 27, 2017
Pub. L. 115–14 (text) (PDF)	March 27, 2017	H.J.Res. 58	Providing for congressional disapproval under chapter 8 of title 5, United States Code, of the rule submitted by the Department of Education relating to teacher preparation issues	passed House 240–181 on February 7, 2017 passed Senate 59–40 on March 8, 2017 signed by Trump on March 27, 2017
Pub. L. 115–17 (text) (PDF)	March 31, 2017	H.J.Res. 42	Disapproving the rule submitted by the Department of Labor relating to drug testing of unemployment compensation applicants	passed House 236–189 on February 15, 2017 passed Senate 51–48 on March 14, 2017 signed by Trump on March 31, 2017
Pub. L. 115–20 (text) (PDF)	April 3, 2017	H.J.Res. 69	Providing for congressional disapproval under chapter 8 of title 5, United States Code, of the final rule of the Department of the Interior relating to "Non-Subsistence Take of Wildlife, and Public Participation and Closure Procedures, on National Wildlife Refuges in Alaska"	passed House 225–193 on February 16, 2017 passed Senate 52–47 on March 21, 2017 signed by Trump on April 3, 2017
Pub. L. 115–21 (text) (PDF)	April 3, 2017	H.J.Res. 83	Disapproving the rule submitted by the Department of Labor relating to “Clarification of Employer’s Continuing Obligation to Make and Maintain an Accurate Record of Each Recordable Injury and Illness”	passed House 231–191 on March 1, 2017 passed Senate 50–48 on March 22, 2017 signed by Trump on April 3, 2017
Pub. L. 115–22 (text) (PDF)	April 3, 2017	S.J.Res. 34	Providing for congressional disapproval under chapter 8 of title 5, United States Code, of the rule submitted by the Federal Communications Commission relating to "Protecting the Privacy of Customers of Broadband and Other Telecommunications Services"	passed Senate 50–48 on March 23, 2017 passed House 215–205 on March 28, 2017 signed by Trump on April 3, 2017
Pub. L. 115–23 (text) (PDF)	April 13, 2017	H.J.Res. 43	Providing for congressional disapproval under chapter 8 of title 5, United States Code, of the final rule submitted by Secretary of Health and Human Services relating to compliance with Title X requirements by project recipients in selecting subrecipients	passed House 230–188 on February 16, 2017 passed Senate 51–50 on March 30, 2017 signed by Trump on April 13, 2017
Pub. L. 115–24 (text) (PDF)	April 13, 2017	H.J.Res. 67	Disapproving the rule submitted by the Department of Labor relating to savings arrangements established by qualified State political subdivisions for non-governmental employees	passed House 234–191 on February 15, 2017 passed Senate 50–49 on March 30, 2017 signed by Trump on April 13, 2017
Pub. L. 115–35 (text) (PDF)	May 17, 2017	H.J.Res. 66	Disapproving the rule submitted by the Department of Labor relating to savings arrangements established by States for non-governmental employees	passed House 231–193 on February 15, 2017 passed Senate 50–49 on May 3, 2017 signed by Trump on May 17, 2017
Pub. L. 115–74 (text) (PDF)	November 1, 2017	H.J.Res. 111	Providing for congressional disapproval under chapter 8 of title 5, United States Code, of the rule submitted by Bureau of Consumer Financial Protection relating to "Arbitration Agreements"	passed House 231–190 on July 25, 2017 passed Senate 51–50 on October 24, 2017 signed by Trump on November 1, 2017
Pub. L. 115–172 (text) (PDF)	May 21, 2018	S.J.Res. 57	Providing for congressional disapproval under chapter 8 of title 5, United States Code, of the rule submitted by Bureau of Consumer Financial Protection relating to "Indirect Auto Lending and Compliance with the Equal Credit Opportunity Act"	passed Senate 51–47 on April 18, 2018 passed House 234–175–1 on May 8, 2018 signed by Trump on May 21, 2018
Pub. L. 117–22 (text) (PDF)	June 30, 2021	S.J.Res. 13	Providing for congressional disapproval under chapter 8 of title 5, United States Code, of the rule submitted by the Equal Employment Opportunity Commission relating to "Update of Commission's Conciliation Procedures"	passed Senate 50–48 on May 19, 2021 passed House 219–210 on June 24, 2021 signed by Biden on June 30, 2021
Pub. L. 117–23 (text) (PDF)	June 30, 2021	S.J.Res. 14	Providing for congressional disapproval under chapter 8 of title 5, United States Code, of the rule submitted by the Environmental Protection Agency relating to "Oil and Natural Gas Sector: Emission Standards for New, Reconstructed, and Modified Sources Review"	passed Senate 52–42 on April 28, 2021 passed House 229–191 on June 25, 2021 signed by Biden on June 30, 2021
Pub. L. 117–24 (text) (PDF)	June 30, 2021	S.J.Res. 15	Providing for congressional disapproval under chapter 8 of title 5, United States Code, of the rule submitted by the Office of the Comptroller of Currency relating to "National Banks and Federal Savings Associations as Lenders"	passed Senate 52–47 on May 11, 2021 passed House 218–208 on June 24, 2021 signed by Biden on June 30, 2021
Pub. L. 119–2 (text) (PDF)	March 14, 2025	H.J.Res. 35	Providing for congressional disapproval under chapter 8 of title 5, United States Code, of the rule submitted by the Environmental Protection Agency relating to "Waste Emissions Charge for Petroleum and Natural Gas Systems: Procedures for Facilitating Compliance, Including Netting and Exemptions"	passed House 220–206–1 on February 26, 2025 passed Senate 52–47 on February 27, 2025 signed by Trump on March 14, 2025
Pub. L. 119–3 (text) (PDF)	March 14, 2025	S.J.Res. 11	Providing for congressional disapproval under chapter 8 of title 5, United States Code, of the rule submitted by the Bureau of Ocean Energy Management relating to "Protection of Marine Archaeological Resources"	passed Senate 54–44 on February 25, 2025 passed House 221–202–1 on March 6, 2025 signed by Trump on March 14, 2025
Pub. L. 119–5 (text) (PDF)	April 10, 2025	H.J.Res. 25	Providing for congressional disapproval under chapter 8 of title 5, United States Code, of the rule submitted by the Internal Revenue Service relating to "Gross Proceeds Reporting by Brokers That Regularly Provide Services Effectuating Digital Asset Sales"	passed House 292–132–1 on March 11, 2025 passed Senate 70–28 on March 26, 2025 signed by Trump on April 10, 2025
Pub. L. 119–6 (text) (PDF)	May 9, 2025	H.J.Res. 20	Providing for congressional disapproval under chapter 8 of title 5, United States Code, of the rule submitted by the Department of Energy relating to "Energy Conservation Program: Energy Conservation Standards for Consumer Gas-fired Instantaneous Water Heaters"	passed House 221–198–2 on February 27, 2025 passed Senate 53–44 on April 10, 2025 signed by Trump on May 9, 2025
Pub. L. 119–7 (text) (PDF)	May 9, 2025	H.J.Res. 24	Providing for congressional disapproval under chapter 8 of title 5, United States Code, of the rule submitted by the Department of Energy relating to "Energy Conservation Program: Energy Conservation Standards for Walk-In Coolers and Walk-In Freezers"	passed House 203–182 on March 27, 2025 passed Senate 53–42 on April 3, 2025 signed by Trump on May 9, 2025
Pub. L. 119–8 (text) (PDF)	May 9, 2025	H.J.Res. 42	Providing for congressional disapproval under chapter 8 of title 5, United States Code, of the rule submitted by the Department of Energy relating to "Energy Conservation Program for Appliance Standards: Certification Requirements, Labeling Requirements, and Enforcement Provisions for Certain Consumer Products and Commercial Equipment"	passed House 222–203 on March 5, 2025 passed Senate 52–46 on April 30, 2025 signed by Trump on May 9, 2025
Pub. L. 119–9 (text) (PDF)	May 9, 2025	H.J.Res. 75	Providing for congressional disapproval under chapter 8 of title 5, United States Code, of the rule submitted by the Office of Energy Efficiency and Renewable Energy, Department of Energy relating to "Energy Conservation Program: Energy Conservation Standards for Commercial Refrigerators, Freezers, and Refrigerator-Freezers"	passed House 214–193 on March 27, 2025 passed Senate 52–45 on May 1, 2025 signed by Trump on May 9, 2025
Pub. L. 119–10 (text) (PDF)	May 9, 2025	S.J.Res. 18	Disapproving the rule submitted by the Bureau of Consumer Financial Protection relating to "Overdraft Lending: Very Large Financial Institutions"	passed Senate 52–48 on March 27, 2025 passed House 217–211 on April 9, 2025 signed by Trump on May 9, 2025
Pub. L. 119–11 (text) (PDF)	May 9, 2025	S.J.Res. 28	Disapproving the rule submitted by the Bureau of Consumer Financial Protection relating to "Defining Larger Participants of a Market for General-Use Digital Consumer Payment Applications"	passed Senate 51–47 on March 5, 2025 passed House 219–211 on April 9, 2025 signed by Trump on May 9, 2025
Pub. L. 119–13 (text) (PDF)	May 23, 2025	H.J.Res. 60	Providing for congressional disapproval under chapter 8 of title 5, United States Code, of the rule submitted by the National Park Service relating to "Glen Canyon National Recreation Area: Motor Vehicles"	passed House 219–205 on April 29, 2025 passed Senate 50–43 on May 8, 2025 signed by Trump on May 23, 2025
Pub. L. 119–14 (text) (PDF)	May 23, 2025	H.J.Res. 61	Providing for congressional disapproval under chapter 8 of title 5, United States Code, of the rule submitted by the Environmental Protection Agency relating to "National Emission Standards for Hazardous Air Pollutants: Rubber Tire Manufacturing"	passed House 216–202 on March 5, 2025 passed Senate 55–45 on May 6, 2025 signed by Trump on May 23, 2025
Pub. L. 119–15 (text) (PDF)	June 12, 2025	H.J.Res. 87	Providing congressional disapproval under chapter 8 of title 5, United States Code, of the rule submitted by the Environmental Protection Agency relating to "California State Motor Vehicle and Engine Pollution Control Standards; Heavy-Duty Vehicle and Engine Emission Warranty and Maintenance Provisions; Advanced Clean Trucks; Zero Emission Airport Shuttle; Zero-Emission Power Train Certification; Waiver of Preemption; Notice of Decision"	passed House 231–191 on April 30, 2025 passed Senate 51–45 on May 22, 2025 signed by Trump on June 12, 2025
Pub. L. 119–16 (text) (PDF)	June 12, 2025	H.J.Res. 88	Providing congressional disapproval under chapter 8 of title 5, United States Code, of the rule submitted by the Environmental Protection Agency relating to "California State Motor Vehicle and Engine Pollution Control Standards; Advanced Clean Cars II; Waiver of Preemption; Notice of Decision"	passed House 246–164 on May 1, 2025 passed Senate 51–44 on May 22, 2025 signed by Trump on June 12, 2025
Pub. L. 119–17 (text) (PDF)	June 12, 2025	H.J.Res. 89	Providing congressional disapproval under chapter 8 of title 5, United States Code, of the rule submitted by the Environmental Protection Agency relating to "California State Motor Vehicle and Engine and Nonroad Engine Pollution Control Standards; The 'Omnibus' Low NOX Regulation; Waiver of Preemption; Notice of Decision"	passed House 225–196 on April 30, 2025 passed Senate 49–46 on May 22, 2025 signed by Trump on June 12, 2025
Pub. L. 119–19 (text) (PDF)	June 20, 2025	S.J.Res. 13	Providing for congressional disapproval under chapter 8 of title 5, United States Code, of the rule submitted by the Office of the Comptroller of the Currency relating to "Business Combinations Under the Bank Merger Act"	passed Senate 52–47 on May 7, 2025 passed House 220–207 on May 20, 2025 signed by Trump on June 20, 2025
Pub. L. 119–20 (text) (PDF)	June 20, 2025	S.J.Res. 31	Providing for congressional disapproval under chapter 8 of title 5, United States Code, of the rule submitted by the Environmental Protection Agency relating to "Review of Final Rule Reclassification of Major Sources as Area Sources Under Section 112 of the Clean Air Act"	passed Senate 52–46 on May 1, 2025 passed House 216–212 on May 22, 2025 signed by Trump on June 20, 2025
Pub. L. 119–47 (menu; GPO has not yet published law)	December 5, 2025	S.J.Res. 80	Providing for congressional disapproval under chapter 8 of title 5, United States Code, of the rule submitted by the Bureau of Land Management relating to "National Petroleum Reserve in Alaska Integrated Activity Plan Record of Decision"	passed Senate 52–45 on October 30, 2025 passed House 216–209 on November 18, 2025 signed by Trump on December 5, 2025
Pub. L. 119–48 (menu; GPO has not yet published law)	December 11, 2025	H.J.Res. 104	Providing for congressional disapproval under chapter 8 of title 5, United States Code, of the rule submitted by the Bureau of Land Management relating to "Miles City Field Office Record of Decision and Approved Resource Management Plan Amendment"	passed House 211–208 on September 3, 2025 passed Senate 52–47 on October 8, 2025 signed by Trump on December 11, 2025
Pub. L. 119–49 (menu; GPO has not yet published law)	December 11, 2025	H.J.Res. 105	Providing for congressional disapproval under chapter 8 of title 5, United States Code, of the rule submitted by the Bureau of Land Management relating to "North Dakota Field Office Record of Decision and Approved Resource Management Plan"	signed by Trump on December 11, 2025
Pub. L. 119–50 (menu; GPO has not yet published law)	December 11, 2025	H.J.Res. 106	Providing for congressional disapproval under chapter 8 of title 5, United States Code, of the rule submitted by the Bureau of Land Management relating to "Central Yukon Record of Decision and Approved Resource Management Plan"	signed by Trump on December 11, 2025
Pub. L. 119–51 (menu; GPO has not yet published law)	December 11, 2025	H.J.Res. 130	Providing for congressional disapproval under chapter 8 of title 5, United States Code, of the rule submitted by the Bureau of Land Management relating to "Buffalo Field Office Record of Decision and Approved Resource Management Plan Amendment"	signed by Trump on December 11, 2025
Pub. L. 119–52 (menu; GPO has not yet published law)	December 11, 2025	H.J.Res. 131	Providing for congressional disapproval under chapter 8 of title 5, United States Code, of the rule submitted by the Bureau of Land Management relating to "Coastal Plain Oil and Gas Leasing Program Record of Decision"	signed by Trump on December 11, 2025

==== Awaiting action by the Senate ====
The following joint resolutions have been passed by the House of Representatives in the 119th Congress and are awaiting consideration by the Senate.

Resolution	Title	Actions
H.J.Res. 78	Providing for congressional disapproval under chapter 8 of title 5, United States Code, of the rule submitted by the United States Fish and Wildlife Service relating to "Endangered and Threatened Wildlife and Plants; Endangered Species Status for the San Francisco Bay-Delta Distinct Population Segment of the Longfin Smelt"	passed House 216–195 on May 1, 2025

==== Awaiting action by the House ====
The following joint resolutions have been passed by the Senate in the 119th Congress and are awaiting consideration by the House.

Resolution	Title	Actions
S.J.Res. 7	Providing for congressional disapproval under chapter 8 of title 5, United States Code, of the rule submitted by the Federal Communications Commission relating to "Addressing the Homework Gap Through the E-Rate Program"	passed Senate 50–38 on May 8, 2025
S.J.Res. 55	Providing for congressional disapproval under chapter 8 of title 5, United States Code, of the rule submitted by the National Highway Traffic Safety Administration relating to "Federal Motor Vehicle Safety Standards; Fuel System Integrity of Hydrogen Vehicles; Compressed Hydrogen Storage System Integrity; Incorporation by Reference"	passed Senate 51–46 on May 21, 2025

=== Unsuccessful attempts ===
==== Vetoed by President ====
The following is a complete list of joint resolutions under the Congressional Review Act that were vetoed by the president after having been passed by both houses of Congress and were not able to have the vetos overridden:

Resolution	Congress	Year	Title	Actions
S.J.Res. 8	114th Congress	2015	Providing for congressional disapproval under chapter 8 of title 5, United States Code, of the rule submitted by the National Labor Relations Board relating to representation case procedures	passed Senate 53–46 on March 4, 2015 passed House 232–186 on March 19, 2015 vetoed by Obama on March 31, 2015 motion to table veto message agreed to in Senate 96–3 on May 5, 2015
S.J.Res. 22	114th Congress	2015	Providing for congressional disapproval under chapter 8 of title 5, United States Code, of the rule submitted by the Army Corps of Engineers and the Environmental Protection Agency relating to the definition of "waters of the United States" under the Federal Water Pollution Control Act	passed Senate 53–44 on November 4, 2015 passed House 253–166 on January 13, 2016 vetoed by Obama on January 20, 2016 cloture on veto override not invoked in Senate 52–40 on January 21, 2016
S.J.Res. 23	114th Congress	2015	Providing for congressional disapproval under chapter 8 of title 5, United States Code, of a rule submitted by the Environmental Protection Agency relating to "Standards of Performance for Greenhouse Gas Emissions from New, Modified, and Reconstructed Stationary Sources: Electric Utility Generating Units"	passed Senate 52–46 on November 17, 2015 passed House 235–188 on December 1, 2015 vetoed by Obama on December 18, 2015
S.J.Res. 24	114th Congress	2015	Providing for congressional disapproval under chapter 8 of title 5, United States Code, of a rule submitted by the Environmental Protection Agency relating to "Carbon Pollution Emission Guidelines for Existing Stationary Sources: Electric Utility Generating Units"	passed Senate 52–46 on November 17, 2015 passed House 242–180 on December 1, 2015 vetoed by Obama on December 18, 2015
H.J.Res. 88	114th Congress	2016	Disapproving the rule submitted by the Department of Labor relating to the definition of the term "Fiduciary"	passed House 234–183 on April 28, 2016 passed Senate 56–41 on May 24, 2016 vetoed by Obama on June 8, 2016 override vote in House failed 239–180 on June 22, 2016
H.J.Res. 76	116th Congress	2020	Providing for congressional disapproval under chapter 8 of title 5, United States Code, of the rule submitted by the Department of Education relating to "Borrower Defense Institutional Accountability".	passed House 231–180 on January 16, 2020 passed Senate 53–42 on March 11, 2020 vetoed by Trump on May 29, 2020 override vote in House failed 238–173 on June 26, 2020
H.J.Res. 30	118th Congress	2023	Providing for congressional disapproval under chapter 8 of title 5, United States Code, of the rule submitted by the Department of Labor relating to "Prudence and Loyalty in Selecting Plan Investments and Exercising Shareholder Rights".	passed House 216–204 on February 28, 2023 passed Senate 50–46 on March 1, 2023 vetoed by Biden on March 20, 2023 override vote in House failed 219–200 on March 23, 2023
H.J.Res. 27	118th Congress	2023	Providing for congressional disapproval under chapter 8 of title 5, United States Code, of the rule submitted by the Department of the Army, Army Corps of Engineers, Department of Defense and the Environmental Protection Agency relating to "Revised Definition of 'Waters of the United States'".	passed House 227–198 on March 9, 2023 passed Senate 53–43 on March 29, 2023 vetoed by Biden on April 6, 2023 override vote in House failed 227–196 on April 18, 2023
H.J.Res. 39	118th Congress	2023	Disapproving the rule submitted by the Department of Commerce relating to "Procedures Covering Suspension of Liquidation, Duties and Estimated Duties in Accord With Presidential Proclamation 10414".	passed House 221–202 on April 28, 2023 passed Senate 56–41 on May 3, 2023 vetoed by Biden on May 16, 2023 override vote in House failed 214–205 on May 24, 2023
H.J.Res. 45	118th Congress	2023	Providing for congressional disapproval under chapter 8 of title 5, United States Code, of the rule submitted by the Department of Education relating to "Waivers and Modifications of Federal Student Loans".	passed House 218–203 on May 24, 2023 passed Senate 52–46 on June 1, 2023 vetoed by Biden on June 7, 2023 override vote in House failed 221–206 on June 21, 2023
S.J.Res. 11	118th Congress	2023	Providing for congressional disapproval under chapter 8 of title 5, United States Code, of the rule submitted by the Environmental Protection Agency relating to "Control of Air Pollution From New Motor Vehicles: Heavy-Duty Engine and Vehicle Standards".	passed Senate 50–49 on April 26, 2023 passed House 221–203 on May 23, 2023 vetoed by Biden on June 14, 2023 override vote in Senate failed 50–50 on June 21, 2023
S.J.Res. 9	118th Congress	2023	Providing for congressional disapproval under chapter 8 of title 5, United States Code, of the rule submitted by the United States Fish and Wildlife Service relating to "Endangered and Threatened Wildlife and Plants; Lesser Prairie-Chicken; Threatened Status with Section 4(d) Rule for the Northern Distinct Population Segment and Endangered Status for the Southern Distinct Population Segment".	passed Senate 50–48 on May 3, 2023 passed House 221–206 on July 27, 2023 vetoed by Biden on September 26, 2023 override vote in Senate failed 47–46 on September 28, 2023
S.J.Res. 24	118th Congress	2023	Providing for congressional disapproval under chapter 8 of title 5, United States Code, of the rule submitted by the United States Fish and Wildlife Service relating to "Endangered and Threatened Wildlife and Plants; Endangered Species Status for Northern Long-Eared Bat".	passed Senate 51–49 on May 11, 2023 passed House 220–209 on July 27, 2023 vetoed by Biden on September 26, 2023 override vote in Senate failed 47–45 on September 28, 2023
S.J.Res. 32	118th Congress	2023	Providing for congressional disapproval under chapter 8 of title 5, United States Code, of the rule submitted by the Bureau of Consumer Financial Protection relating to "Small Business Lending Under the Equal Credit Opportunity Act (Regulation B)".	passed Senate 53–44 on October 18, 2023 passed House 221–202–1 on December 1, 2023 vetoed by Biden on December 19, 2023 override vote in Senate failed 54–45 on January 10, 2024
S.J.Res. 38	118th Congress	2023	Providing for congressional disapproval under chapter 8 of title 5, United States Code, of the rule submitted by the Federal Highway Administration relating to "Waiver of Buy America Requirements for Electric Vehicle Chargers".	passed Senate 50–48 on November 8, 2023 passed House 209–198 on January 11, 2024 vetoed by Biden on January 24, 2024 override vote in Senate failed 50–47 on February 29, 2024
H.J.Res. 98	118th Congress	2024	Providing for congressional disapproval under chapter 8 of title 5, United States Code, of the rule submitted by the National Labor Relations Board relating to "Standard for Determining Joint Employer Status".	passed House 206–177 on January 12, 2024 passed Senate 50–48 on April 10, 2024 vetoed by Biden on May 6, 2024 override vote in House failed 214–191 on May 7, 2024
H.J. Res. 109	118th Congress	2024	Providing for congressional disapproval under chapter 8 of title 5, United States Code, of the rule submitted by the Securities and Exchange Commission relating to "Staff Accounting Bulletin No. 121".	passed House 228–182 on May 8, 2024 passed Senate 60–38 on May 16, 2024 vetoed by Biden on May 31, 2024 override vote in House failed 228–184 on July 11, 2024

==== Passed by only one chamber ====
Resolution	Congress	Year	Title	Actions
S.J.Res. 17	108th Congress	2003	Disapproving the rule submitted by the Federal Communications Commission with respect to broadcast media ownership	passed Senate 55–40 on September 16, 2003 not acted on by House
S.J.Res. 4	109th Congress	2005	Providing for congressional disapproval of the rule submitted by the Department of Agriculture under chapter 8 of title 5, United States Code, relating to risk zones for introduction of bovine spongiform encephalopathy	passed Senate 52–46 on March 3, 2005 not acted on by House
S.J.Res. 28	110th Congress	2008	Disapproving the rule submitted by the Federal Communications Commission with respect to broadcast media ownership	passed Senate by voice vote on May 15, 2008 not acted on by House
H.J.Res. 37	112th Congress	2011	Disapproving the rule submitted by the Federal Communications Commission with respect to regulating the Internet and broadband industry practices	passed House 240–179 on August 4, 2011 not acted on by Senate
H.J.Res. 118	112th Congress	2012	Providing for congressional disapproval under chapter 8 of title 5, United States Code, of the rule submitted by the Office of Family Assistance of the Administration for Children and Families of the Department of Health and Human Services relating to waiver and expenditure authority under section 1115 of the Social Security Act (42 U.S.C. 1315) with respect to the Temporary Assistance for Needy Families program	passed House 250–164 on September 20, 2012 not acted on by Senate
S.J.Res. 28	114th Congress	2016	Providing for congressional disapproval under chapter 8 of title 5, United States Code, of the rule submitted by the Secretary of Agriculture relating to inspection of fish of the order Siluriformes	passed Senate 55–43 on May 23, 2016 not acted on by House
H.J.Res. 36	115th Congress	2017	Providing for congressional disapproval under chapter 8 of title 5, United States Code, of the final rule of the Bureau of Land Management relating to "Waste Prevention, Production Subject to Royalties, and Resource Conservation"	passed House 221–191 on February 3, 2017 motion to proceed not agreed to in Senate 49–51 on May 10, 2017
S.J.Res. 52	115th Congress	2018	Providing for congressional disapproval under chapter 8 of title 5, United States Code, of the rule submitted by the Federal Communications Commission relating to "Restoring Internet Freedom"	passed Senate 52–47 on May 16, 2018 not acted on by House
S.J.Res. 64	115th Congress	2018	Providing for congressional disapproval under chapter 8 of title 5, United States Code, of the rule submitted by the Department of the Treasury relating to “Returns by Exempt Organizations and Returns by Certain Non-Exempt Organizations”	passed Senate 50–49 on December 12, 2018 not acted on by House
H.J.Res. 90	116th Congress	2020	Providing for congressional disapproval under chapter 8 of title 5, United States Code, of the rule submitted by the Office of the Comptroller of the Currency relating to Community Reinvestment Act Regulations	passed House 230–179 on June 29, 2020 motion to proceed not agreed to in Senate 43–48 on October 19, 2020
S.J.Res. 29	117th Congress	2021	Providing for congressional disapproval under chapter 8 of title 5, United States Code, of the rule submitted by the Department of Labor relating to "COVID-19 Vaccination and Testing; Emergency Temporary Standard"	passed Senate 52–48 on December 8, 2021 not acted on by House
S.J.Res. 32	117th Congress	2022	Providing for congressional disapproval under chapter 8 of title 5, United States Code, of the rule submitted by the Centers for Medicare & Medicaid Services relating to "Medicare and Medicaid Programs; Omnibus COVID-19 Health Care Staff Vaccination"	passed Senate 49–44 on March 2, 2022 not acted on by House
S.J.Res. 37	117th Congress	2022	Providing for congressional disapproval under chapter 8 of title 5, United States Code, of the rule submitted by Centers for Disease Control and Prevention relating to "Requirement for Persons To Wear Masks While on Conveyances and at Transportation Hubs"	passed Senate 57–40 on March 15, 2022 not acted on by House
S.J.Res. 39	117th Congress	2022	Providing for congressional disapproval under chapter 8 of title 5, United States Code, of the rule submitted by the Department of Health and Human Services relating to "Vaccine and Mask Requirements To Mitigate the Spread of COVID-19 in Head Start Programs"	passed Senate 55–41 on May 3, 2022 not acted on by House
S.J.Res. 55	117th Congress	2022	Providing for congressional disapproval under chapter 8 of title 5, United States Code, of the rule submitted by the Council on Environmental Quality relating to "National Environmental Policy Act Implementing Regulations Revisions"	passed Senate 50–47 on August 4, 2022 not acted on by House
S.J.Res. 23	118th Congress	2023	Providing for congressional disapproval under chapter 8 of title 5, United States Code, of the rule submitted by the National Marine Fisheries Service relating to "Endangered and Threatened Wildlife and Plants; Regulations for Listing Endangered and Threatened Species and Designating Critical Habitat".	passed Senate 51–49 on May 11, 2023 not acted on by House
S.J.Res. 18	118th Congress	2023	Disapproving of the rule submitted by the Department of Homeland Security relating to "Public Charge Ground of Inadmissibility".	passed Senate 50–47 on May 17, 2023 not acted on by House
H.J.Res. 44	118th Congress	2023	Providing for congressional disapproval under chapter 8 of title 5, United States Code, of the rule submitted by the Bureau of Alcohol, Tobacco, Firearms, and Explosives relating to "Factoring Criteria for Firearms with Attached 'Stabilizing Braces'".	passed House 219–210 on June 13, 2023 failed in Senate 49–50 on June 22, 2023
H.J.Res. 88	118th Congress	2023	Providing for congressional disapproval under chapter 8 of title 5, United States Code, of the rule submitted by the Department of Education relating to "Improving Income Driven Repayment for the William D. Ford Federal Direct Loan Program and the Federal Family Education Loan (FFEL) Program".	passed House 210–189 on December 7, 2023 not acted on by Senate
S.J.Res. 62	118th Congress	2024	Providing for congressional disapproval under chapter 8 of title 5, United States Code, of the rule submitted by the Animal and Plant Health Inspection Service relating to "Importation of Fresh Beef From Paraguay".	passed Senate 70–25 on March 21, 2024 not acted on by House
S.J.Res. 61	118th Congress	2024	Providing for congressional disapproval under chapter 8 of title 5, United States Code, of the rule submitted by the Federal Highway Administration relating to "National Performance Management Measures; Assessing Performance of the National Highway System, Greenhouse Gas Emissions Measure".	passed Senate 53–47 on April 10, 2024 not acted on by House
S.J.Res. 58	118th Congress	2024	Providing for congressional disapproval under chapter 8 of title 5, United States Code, of the rule submitted by the Department of Energy relating to "Energy Conservation Program: Energy Conservation Standards for Consumer Furnaces".	passed Senate 50–45 on May 21, 2024 not acted on by House
H.J.Res. 165	118th Congress	2024	Providing for congressional disapproval under chapter 8 of title 5, United States Code, of the rule submitted by the Department of Education relating to "Nondiscrimination on the Basis of Sex in Education Programs or Activities Receiving Federal Financial Assistance".	passed House 210–205 on July 11, 2024 not acted on by Senate
S.J.Res. 3	119th Congress	2025	Providing for congressional disapproval under chapter 8 of title 5, United States Code, of the rule submitted by the Internal Revenue Service relating to "Gross Proceeds Reporting by Brokers That Regularly Provide Services Effectuating Digital Asset Sales".	passed Senate 70–27 on March 4, 2025 returned to Senate on March 11, 2025 (Note: The House returned S.J. Res. 3 to the Senate pursuant to H.Res. 212, which expressed the House's opinion that the bill violated the constitutional requirement that revenue provisions originate in the House. The House passed its own version of the resolution (H.J. Res. 25) on the same day, which later became Pub. L. 119–5 (see above).)

==== Did not pass either chamber ====
Resolution	Congress	Year	Title	Actions
S.J.Res. 60	104th Congress	1996	To disapprove the rule submitted by the Health Care Financing Administration on August 30, 1996, relating to hospital reimbursement under the Medicare program	failed in Senate by unanimous consent on September 17, 1996
S.J.Res. 20	109th Congress	2005	Disapproving a rule promulgated by the Administrator of the Environmental Protection Agency to delist coal and oil-direct utility units from the source category list under the Clean Air Act	failed in Senate 47–51 on September 13, 2005
S.J.Res. 26	111th Congress	2010	Disapproving a rule submitted by the Environmental Protection Agency relating to the endangerment finding and the cause or contribute findings for greenhouse gases under section 202(a) of the Clean Air Act	motion to proceed not agreed to in Senate 47–53 on June 10, 2010
S.J.Res. 30	111th Congress	2010	Providing for congressional disapproval under chapter 8 of title 5, United States Code, of the rule submitted by the National Mediation Board relating to representation election procedures	motion to proceed not agreed to in Senate 43–56 on September 23, 2010
S.J.Res. 39	111th Congress	2010	Providing for congressional disapproval under chapter 8 of title 5, United States Code, of the rule relating to status as a grandfathered health plan under the Patient Protection and Affordable Care Act	motion to proceed not agreed to in Senate 40–59 on September 29, 2010
S.J.Res. 6	112th Congress	2011	Disapproving the rule submitted by the Federal Communications Commission with respect to regulating the Internet and broadband industry practices	motion to proceed not agreed to in Senate 46–52 on November 10, 2011
S.J.Res. 27	112th Congress	2011	Disapproving a rule submitted by the Environmental Protection Agency relating to the mitigation by States of cross-border air pollution under the Clean Air Act	motion to proceed not agreed to in Senate 41–56 on November 10, 2011
S.J.Res. 36	112th Congress	2012	Providing for congressional disapproval under chapter 8 of title 5, United States Code, of the rule submitted by the National Labor Relations Board relating to representation election procedures	motion to proceed not agreed to in Senate 45–54 on April 24, 2012
S.J.Res. 37	112th Congress	2012	To disapprove a rule promulgated by the Administrator of the Environmental Protection Agency relating to emission standards for certain steam generating units	motion to proceed not agreed to in Senate 46–53 on June 20, 2012
S.J.Res. 63	115th Congress	2018	Providing for congressional disapproval under chapter 8 of title 5, United States Code, of the rule submitted by the Secretary of the Treasury, Secretary of Labor, and Secretary of Health and Human Services relating to "Short-Term, Limited Duration Insurance"	failed in Senate 50–50 on October 10, 2018
S.J.Res. 50	116th Congress	2019	Providing for congressional disapproval under chapter 8 of title 5, United States Code, of the rule submitted by the Internal Revenue Service, Department of the Treasury, relating to "Contributions in Exchange for State or Local Tax Credits"	failed in Senate 43–52 on October 23, 2019
S.J.Res. 52	116th Congress	2019	Providing for congressional disapproval under chapter 8 of title 5, United States Code, of the rule submitted by the Secretary of the Treasury and the Secretary of Health and Human Services relating to "State Relief and Empowerment Waivers"	failed in Senate 43–52 on October 30, 2019
S.J.Res. 53	116th Congress	2019	Providing for congressional disapproval under chapter 8 of title 5, United States Code, of the rule submitted by the Environmental Protection Agency relating to "Repeal of the Clean Power Plan; Emission Guidelines for Greenhouse Gas Emissions From Existing Electric Utility Generating Units; Revisions to Emission Guidelines Implementing Regulations"	failed in Senate 41–53 on October 17, 2019
S.J.Res. 41	117th Congress	2022	Providing for congressional disapproval under chapter 8 of title 5, United States Code, of the rule submitted by the Department of Health and Human Services relating to "Ensuring Access to Equitable, Affordable, Client-Centered, Quality Family Planning Services".	motion to proceed not agreed to in Senate 49–49 on April 27, 2022
S.J.Res. 46	117th Congress	2022	Providing for congressional disapproval under chapter 8 of title 5, United States Code, of the rule submitted by the Department of Justice and the Department of Homeland Security relating to "Procedures for Credible Fear Screening and Consideration of Asylum, Withholding of Removal, and CAT Protection Claims by Asylum Officers".	failed in Senate 46–48 on May 26, 2022
S.J.Res. 60	117th Congress	2022	Providing for congressional disapproval under chapter 8 of title 5, United States Code, of the rule submitted by the Department of Education relating to "Final Priorities, Requirements, Definitions, and Selection Criteria-Expanding Opportunity Through Quality Charter Schools Program (CSP)-Grants to State Entities (State Entity Grants); Grants to Charter Management Organizations for the Replication and Expansion of High-Quality Charter Schools (CMO Grants); and Grants to Charter School Developers for the Opening of New Charter Schools and for the Replication and Expansion of High-Quality Charter Schools (Developer Grants)".	failed in Senate 49–49 on December 14, 2022
S.J.Res. 10	118th Congress	2023	Providing for congressional disapproval under chapter 8 of title 5, United States Code, of the rule submitted by the Department of Veterans Affairs relating to "Reproductive Health Services".	motion to proceed not agreed to in Senate 48–51 on April 19, 2023
S.J.Res. 42	118th Congress	2023	Providing for congressional disapproval under chapter 8 of title 5, United States Code, of the rule submitted by the Food and Nutrition Service relating to "Application of Bostock v. Clayton County to Program Discrimination Complaint Processing-Policy Update".	failed in Senate 47–50 on October 26, 2023
S.J.Res. 43	118th Congress	2023	Providing for congressional disapproval under chapter 8 of title 5, United States Code, of the rule submitted by the Department of Education relating to "Improving Income Driven Repayment for the William D. Ford Federal Direct Loan Program and the Federal Family Education Loan (FFEL) Program".	failed in Senate 49–50 on November 15, 2023
S.J.Res. 57	118th Congress	2024	Providing for congressional disapproval under chapter 8 of title 5, United States Code, of the rule submitted by the Department of the Treasury relating to "Coronavirus State and Local Fiscal Recovery Funds".	failed in Senate 46–49 on May 15, 2024

== Expanded possibilities ==
The CRA emerged as an attractive tool in the 115th Congress because it provides one of the few avenues for Senate action that avoids the ordinary 60-vote cloture requirement. As a result, several new theories about how to expand the reach and power of the CRA have been developed.

=== With regard to previously unsubmitted regulations ===
One provision of the CRA is its stipulation that rules do not go into effect until after they have been submitted to Congress. Since many rules over the last 20 years have never been submitted to Congress, some legal scholars have argued that the rules are not actually in effect and may still be eligible to be overturned even if they were passed many years ago. According to arguments made by the Pacific Legal Foundation (PLF), that could be accomplished in one of three ways: (1) a rule could be submitted to Congress now by the White House and then repealed by a joint resolution under the CRA, (2) the White House could publish notice that a rule not in effect is being withdrawn or abandoned, or (3) a rule could be thrown out by a court on the grounds that it was never in effect.

A variation on the idea was pursued later in the 115th Congress by Senator Pat Toomey (R-PA), who was looking for additional deregulatory pathways. Toomey has criticized government regulators for "regulat[ing] by guidance rather than through the process they're supposed to use, which is the Administrative Procedure Act" and has argued that an official determination that a particular piece of guidance "rises to the significance of being a rule" would mean that "from that moment the clock starts on the CRA opportunity". In response to a request from Toomey for a determination on whether a 2013 auto-lending guidance rule issued by the CFPB qualified as a "rule" under the terms of the CRA, GAO issued an opinion on December 5, 2017, saying that it did, thus launching the 60-day CRA window according to the opinion of the Senate parliamentarian. Subsequently, S.J. Res. 57 was introduced on March 22, 2018, to repeal the CFPB rule, an effort that has been described as a "trial balloon" and, if successful, would open the door to a greatly-expanded application of the CRA to various "rules" issued over the last few decades. Other possible applications are also being explored, including a 2016 plan from the Bureau of Land Management, which the GAO confirmed was a rule for CRA purposes in response to a request from Senator Lisa Murkowski (R-AK). On the other hand, the success of S.J. Res. 57 could prove to be a Pandora's box, setting a dangerous precedent and calling into question the legitimacy of many other rules in a way could create a climate of uncertainty and jeopardy for those who have been following or relying on them. S.J. Res. 57 was signed into law on May 21, 2018.

=== With regard to preemptive regulations ===
Another possible avenue for expanding the power of the CRA concerns its prohibition against any regulation being passed if it is "substantially similar" to one already repealed under the CRA without explicit Congressional approval. Some Republicans have therefore suggested that the Trump administration could preemptively introduce liberal regulations with the intention of having them immediately repealed under the CRA and thereby preventing a future Democratic administration from issuing substantially similar regulations.

== REINS Act ==
Regularly since 2009, Members of Congress have introduced in the House and the Senate versions of the Regulations from the Executive in Need of Scrutiny Act—the REINS Act—a fast-track procedure similar to the Congressional Review Act to review regulations. In five separate Congresses, the House of Representatives passed versions of the bill that died in the Senate. In 2017, a Senate committee reported a version of the bill for the first time. The fiscal year 2025 budget resolution contained a policy statement calling for Congress "to enact legislation through reconciliation that strengthens Congress, scales back Federal regulations, limits future bureaucratic red tape, and unleashes economic growth, such as the Regulations from the Executive in Need of Scrutiny (REINS) Act," but the Senate Parliamentarian determined that a version of the REINS Act violated the Senate's Byrd Rule, which limits what Senators can include in budget reconciliation measures.

The REINS Act would establish a congressional approval process for all major rules, so that no proposed major rule could take effect unless Congress affirmatively approved. The bill would define a major rule as a rule that would likely (1) affect the economy by $100 million or more a year; (2) cause a major increase in costs or prices for consumers, industries, government, or regions; or (3) significantly affect competition, employment, investment, productivity, innovation, or the ability of U.S. businesses to compete with foreign competitors.

== Repeal proposal ==
On May 16, 2017, Senators Cory Booker and Tom Udall introduced S. 1140, a bill to repeal the Congressional Review Act; the bill received no action.
