= Radhika Nair =

Radhika Nair may refer to:

- Radhika Nair (model) (born 1991), Indian fashion model
- Radhika Nair (researcher), Indian biological researcher
- Radhika (Malayalam actress) (born 1984), Malayalam film actress
