= Radhika Fox =

American government official

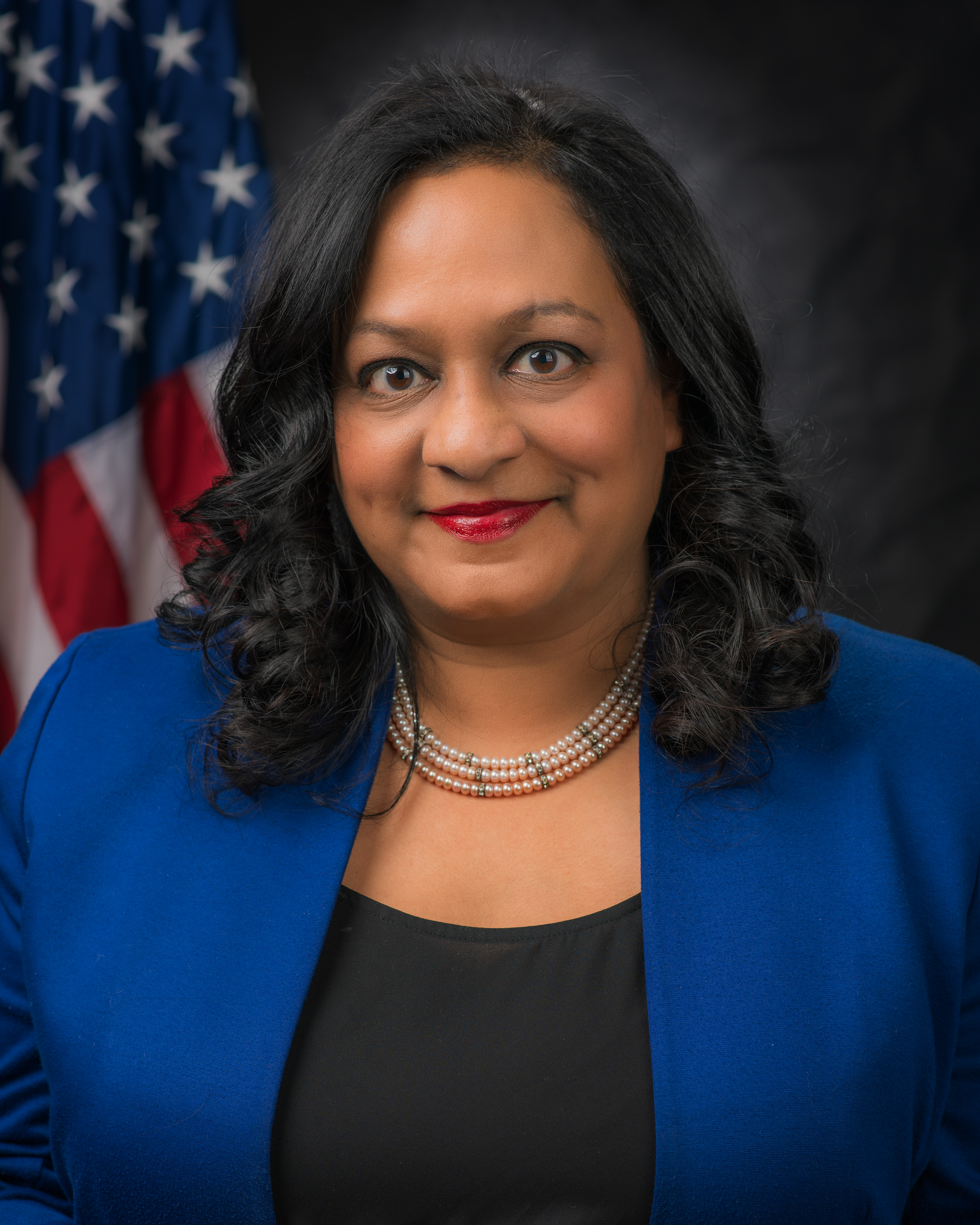

Assistant Administrator of the Environmental Protection Agency for Water
- In office June 23, 2021 – February 2024
- President: Joe Biden
- Preceded by: David Ross

Personal details
- Education: Columbia University (BA); University of California, Berkeley (MA)

Radhika Fox (née Kunamneni) is an American government official who served as the assistant administrator for water at the Environmental Protection Agency from 2021 to 2024.

== Education ==
Fox received her Bachelor of Arts degree from Columbia University in 1995, where she majored in philosophy and religion, and a master's in city and urban planning from the University of California, Berkeley.

== Career ==
She directed policy and government affairs for the San Francisco Public Utilities Commission and served as the federal policy director at PolicyLink before joining the US Water Alliance, where she was CEO from 2015 to 2021. and concurrently worked as the director of the Value of Water Coalition.

=== Biden administration ===
On January 20, 2021, Fox was appointed by President Biden to the position of assistant administrator for water at the Environmental Protection Agency. She was confirmed by the United States Senate on June 16, 2021, by a vote of 55–43.

Fox resigned her position in February 2024.

== Personal life ==
Fox is of Telugu descent. Her grandmother lived in the Guntur district of Andhra Pradesh, where Fox lived while her parents completed training in the United States.
