= Michigan Department of Environment, Great Lakes, and Energy =

Department of the state of Michigan

Department overview
- Formed: 1995
- Preceding agencies: Michigan Department of Environmental Quality (DEQ); Department of Natural Resources and Environment (DNRE)
- Jurisdiction: Michigan
- Headquarters: Deborah A. Stabenow Building, 525 West Allegan St., Lansing, MI 48909
- Annual budget: $502.6 million (2015)
- Department executive: Phil Roos, Director
- Child department: Air Quality Division; Drinking Water and Environmental Health Division; Environmental Support Division; Finance Division; Geologic Resources Management Division; Information Management Division; Materials Management Division; Office of Climate and Energy; Office of Legislative Affairs; Office of Public Information; Office of the Clean Water Public Advocate; Office of the Environmental Justice Public Advocate; Office of the Great Lakes; Remediation and Redevelopment Division; Water Resources Division
- Website: michigan.gov/egle

The Michigan Department of Environment, Great Lakes, and Energy (EGLE), formerly Michigan Department of Environmental Quality (Michigan DEQ, MDEQ, or simply DEQ), is a principal department of the U.S. state of Michigan for environmental issues. The department was created in 1995.

== History ==
=== Environmental Quality ===
In 1995, the Department of Environmental Quality was created by Executive Order No. 1995-18, which transferred environmental regulatory functions from the Michigan Department of Natural Resources (DNR) to the newly created department. This was part of a broader effort by Governor John Engler to "secure more direct oversight over" state environmental policy and reduce the number of state environmental employees through budget cuts."

The DEQ's first director was Russell J. Harding, appointed by Engler. Harding "developed a national reputation for leading opposition to any state intervention on climate change as well as most other policy initiatives proposed by the federal government or by the states and provinces of the Great Lakes Basin." Under Harding, the Michigan DEQ "regularly spurned federal grants to study climate change" and rejected outreach from the U.S. Environmental Protection Agency seeking state engagement. Harding said that he believed that addressing climate change would cause an economic risk to the state.

In 1996, Executive Order No. 1996-1 transferred oversight of environmental health programs "relating to drinking water and radiological protection" from the Michigan Department of Public Health to the DEQ, and Executive Order No. 1996-2 transferred the Low Level Radioactive Waste Authority from the Michigan Department of Commerce to the DEQ.

In 1997, Executive Order No. 1997-2 "transferred the Above Ground Storage Tank Program and the inspection of dry cleaning establishments" from the Department of State Police to the DEQ, and Executive Order No. 1997-3 transferred the Michigan Environmental Science Board and the Environmental Administration Division from the Michigan Department of Management and Budget to the DEQ.

In 1999, the Water Quality Advisory Board was created by Executive Order 1999-10. This body is responsible for advising the DEQ on the "implementation of a comprehensive, long-term water quality monitoring program designed to measure the quality of Michigan's streams, rivers and lakes, and detect areas of the state that need additional water quality control efforts."

In 2009, Governor Jennifer Granholm moved to merge the DNR and the DEQ into a new Department of Natural Resources and Environment (DNRE). The state Senate passed a resolution to stop the merger. However, Granholm's Executive Order No. 2009-45 combined the two over the objections of the Senate.

In early 2010, a new Saginaw Bay District headquarters of the Michigan DNR opened in Bay City; the building was reported to be the most energy-efficient in Michigan. The building was the first governmental office building in Michigan to achieve LEED Platinum certification.

In 2011, Governor Rick Snyder's first-ever executive order, Executive Order 2011-1, split the DNRE, returning DNR and DEQ into separate agencies, which Snyder said would allow each to focus on its core mission. Under a state law enacted in October 2011, the Michigan Geological Survey was transferred from the Michigan DEQ to the Western Michigan University (WMU) Department of Geosciences, making WMU "the designated geoscience agency in Michigan, with responsibility for mapping and assessing the state's geological resources."

=== Flint water crisis ===
In 2015 and 2016, the Michigan DEQ was criticized for its role in the Flint water crisis; agency officials repeatedly dismissed citizens' concerns about water quality in Flint, leading to a delay in addressing lead poisoning in the city's water supply. The DEQ also revised water samples to wrongly indicate that the water was safe, changing the lead-level results from unacceptable to acceptable, delaying action. DEQ Director Dan Wyant acknowledged in October 2015 that the department had failed to follow the relevant federal regulation and had made other errors.

The department also initially dismissed a researcher's reports about rising blood lead levels in Flint children. A December 2015 report by the Flint Water Advisory Task Force found that "primary responsibility" for the Flint water crisis lies with the DEQ and that the department had agency "failed in its responsibility" to ensure safe drinking water. Governor Snyder issued an apology, and DEQ director Wyant and DEQ public information officer Brad Wurfel resigned over the affair.

On April 23, 2019, Status Coup released the documentary Flushing Flint which claimed that the water testing by Michigan Department of Environmental Quality (MDEQ) was manipulated by MDEQ staff taking water samples after flushing running water from taps for several minutes before taking the samples, contrary to normal procedures for water testing for lead and copper, and by MDEQ staff telling residents that they should take water samples after flushing running water from their taps for several minutes. This would clearly contravene the U.S. Environmental Protection Agency (EPA) guidance that samples taken must be "first-draw samples at taps in homes/buildings".

=== Environment, Great Lakes and Energy ===
Gretchen Whitmer's first re-organizational executive order for the department was rejected by the state legislature for eliminating three panels recently created by the legislature. Whitmer signed a second order that retained two of those three panels and changed the department's name to Department of Environment, Great Lakes and Energy. The second order also created an Office of Climate and Energy, Office of the Clean Water Public Advocate and an Interagency Environmental Justice Response Team, and made various other organizational changes. The Office of the Great Lakes was transferred from the Department of Natural Resources. The name change and reorganization took effect on April 22, 2019.

== Administration and budget ==
Sources of DEQ's FY 2015 budget

DEQ's FY 2015 expenditures

The EGLE is headquartered at Constitution Hall in the state capital of Lansing. The DEQ operated ten district and field offices, covering a particular group of counties; these offices are located in the following cities Bay City, Cadillac, Gaylord, Grand Rapids, Kalamazoo, Jackson, Lansing, Marquette, Warren, and Detroit.

Under Michigan Public Act 252 of 2014, the DEQ's budget for fiscal year 2015, which ran from October 1, 2014 to September 30, 2015, was about $502 million. In April 2014, Governor Snyder called for this funding to increase the residential recycling rate in Michigan, which stood then at about 14.5 percent.

== MiCorps ==
MiCorps, the Michigan Clean Water Corps, is a network of volunteer water monitoring programs in Michigan. It was created through an executive order by Governor Jennifer Granholm to assist the Department in collecting and sharing water quality data for use in water resources management and protection programs.

== List of directors ==
- Russell J. Harding (1995–2003) (under Governor John Engler)
- Steven E. Chester (January 2003 – January 2010) (under Governor Jennifer Granholm)
- Dan Wyant (2011 – December 29, 2015) (under Governor Rick Snyder)
- Keith Creagh (December 30, 2015 – July 2016) (interim) (under Governor Rick Snyder)
- Heidi Grether (August 1, 2016 – December 1, 2018) (under Governor Rick Snyder)
- Liesl Clark (2019–2022) (under Governor Gretchen Whitmer)
- Dan Eichinger (December 2, 2022 - April 28, 2023) (interim) (under Governor Gretchen Whitmer)
- Aaron Keatley (April 28, 2023 - June 30, 2023) (interim) (under Governor Gretchen Whitmer)
- Phil Roos (June 30, 2023 – current) (under Governor Gretchen Whitmer)

== See also ==
- Climate change in Michigan
- United States energy law

== Works cited ==
- Barry G. Rabe, Statehouse and Greenhouse: The Emerging Politics of American Climate Change Policy (Washington D.C.: Brookings Institution Press, 2004)
