= Radhika Nair (researcher) =

Indian cancer biology researcher

Radhika Nair is an Indian cancer biology researcher. She currently serves as the Ramanujan Faculty Fellow at the Rajiv Gandhi Centre for Biotechnology, in Trivandrum, India, and senior research officer at Garvan Institute of Medical Research in Darlinghurst, Sydney, New South Wales, Australia. She specializes in understanding the cell intrinsic mechanisms that allow tumor cells to survive, go dormant and then thrive, specifically in breast cancer.

== Education and career ==
After receiving a BSc. in microbiology and biochemistry at St. Xavier's College, Mumbai, in 1996 and an MSc in biochemistry at the Institute of Science, Mumbai in 1998, Nair received a PhD from the National Institute of Immunology, India, at Delhi in 2003. Her PhD work focused on germ cell death. In 2005, she was awarded a post-doctoral Career Development Fellowship in the MRC Cancer Unit at the University of Cambridge, focusing on microbial and eukaryotic genetics.

The UK fellowship was followed by several years as a research scientist at Garvan, working with Alexander Swarbrick, head of the cancer center at the institute. After losing a friend who was suffering from breast cancer. Nair dedicated her life to breast cancer research. At Garvan, she contributed to a collaborative program called ProMis (Prostate Cancer Metastasis). Nair also lectured at St. Vincent's Clinical School at the University of New South Wales in Sydney, Australia.

== Most cited publications ==
- Nair R, Shaha C. Diethylstilbestrol induces rat spermatogenic cell apoptosis in vivo through increased expression of spermatogenic cell Fas/FasL system. Journal of Biological Chemistry. 2003 Feb 21;278(8):6470-81. Cited 130 times according to Google Scholar
- Hochgräfe F, Zhang L, O'Toole SA, Browne BC, Pinese M, Cubas AP, Lehrbach GM, Croucher DR, Rickwood D, Boulghourjian A, Shearer R. Tyrosine phosphorylation profiling reveals the signaling network characteristics of Basal breast cancer cells. Cancer research. 2010 Nov 15;70(22):9391-401. Cited 122 times.
- O'Toole SA, Machalek DA, Shearer RF, Millar EK, Nair R, Schofield P, McLeod D, Cooper CL, McNeil CM, McFarland A, Nguyen A. Hedgehog overexpression is associated with stromal interactions and predicts for poor outcome in breast cancer. Cancer research. 2011 Jun 1;71(11):4002-14. Cited 80 times
