= Radhe Radhe (disambiguation) =

Radhe Radhe may refer to:

- Radhe Radhe, a Hindi expression used as a greeting and salutation
- Radhe Radhe: Rites of Holi, a 2014 album by Vijay Iyer
- "Radhe Radhe", a song by Kula Shaker from the 1999 album Peasants, Pigs & Astronauts
- "Radhe Radhe", a song by Amit Gupta from the 2019 Bollywood movie Dream Girl

== See also ==
- Radhe (disambiguation)
