= Plug-in electric vehicles in Michigan =

As of June 2022, there were 17,460 electric vehicles registered in Michigan.

== Government policy ==
As of April 2022, the state government offers tax rebates of $2,000 for electric vehicle purchases. As of April 2023, the state government charges a 6% sales tax on electric cars.

== Charging stations ==
As of June 2022, there were 1,033 charging station locations in Michigan with 2,322 charging ports.

The Infrastructure Investment and Jobs Act, signed into law in November 2021, allocates US$110 million to charging stations in Michigan.

== Manufacturing ==
Michigan was historically a manufacturing hub for gasoline-powered cars, which has led many electric vehicle manufacturers to establish manufacturing hubs in the state.

== By region ==
=== Detroit ===
As of November 2022, there are plans to outfit sections of road in Detroit with wireless charging infrastructure that charges vehicles while driving with a scheduled completion date sometime in 2024. If completed, it would be the first installation of such technology in the United States.

=== Kalamazoo ===
The first charging station for electric trucks in Michigan opened in Kalamazoo in August 2022.
