= List of Michigan state agencies =

The 1963 Constitution requires that all permanent agencies or commissions, except universities, be assigned to one of a maximum of twenty principal departments. The principal departments are the:

- Department of Agriculture & Rural Development
- Department of Attorney General
- Department of Civil Rights
- Department of Corrections
- Department of Education
- Department of Environment, Great Lakes, and Energy
- Department of Health and Human Services
- Department of Insurance & Financial Services
- Department of Licensing & Regulatory Affairs
- Department of Lifelong Education, Advancement, and Potential (LEAP)
- Department of Military & Veterans Affairs
- Department of Natural Resources
- Department of State (DOS)
- Department of State Police
- Department of Technology, Management & Budget (DTMB)
- Department of Labor and Economic Opportunity (LEO)
- Department of Transportation
- Department of Treasury

Type 1 agencies are under the under administration of the agency but operates independently of the principal department in carrying out its function and in most cases created by a type 1 transfer.

== Current units ==
- State Administrative Board (DTMB)
- Civil Service Commission (DTMB)
- Mackinac Bridge Authority (MDOT)
- Mackinac Island State Park Commission
- Michigan Lottery
- Michigan Railroad Commission
- Michigan Volunteer Defense Force
- Michigan Occupational Safety and Health Administration
- Customer Services Administration (DOS)
- Department Services Administration (DOS)
- Legal and Regulatory Services Administration (DOS)
- Bureau of Branch Office Services (DOS)
- Bureau of Driver and Vehicle Records (DOS)
- Office of Customer Services (DOS)
- Department of State Information Center (DOS)
- Office of Technology and Project Services (DOS)
- Office of Services to the Aging
- Board of State Canvassers
- Center for Educational Performance & Information
- Center for Geographic Information
- Children's Ombudsman
- Community Service Commission
- Economic Development Corporation
- Bureau of Elections
- Gaming Control Board
- Geological Survey
- Office of the Great Seal
- Liquor Control Commission
- Michigan Commission on Law Enforcement Standards
- Michigan Employment Relations Commission
- Michigan State Industries
- Office of Retirement Services
- Public Service Commission
- Racing Commissioner
- Records Management Services
- Renewable Fuels Commission
- State Budget Office (DTMB)
- Office of the State Employer (DTMB)
- State Housing Development Authority
- State Office of Administrative Hearings & Rules
- State Purchasing
- State Transportation Commission
- Tax Tribunal
- Unemployment Insurance Agency
- Women's Commission
- Workers' Compensation Agency
- Archives of Michigan
- Michigan Council for Arts and Cultural Affairs
- Office of Cultural Economic Development
- Library of Michigan
- Mackinac State Historic Parks
- Michigan Film Office
- Michigan Historical Museum
- State Historic Preservation Office
- Veterans Affairs Agency
- Michigan Veterans' Facility Authority
- State Officers Compensation Commission, responsible for setting salaries for Governor, Lieutenant governor, Supreme court justices, and Legislators with the seven Commissioners appointed by the Governor
- Michigan Family Independence Agency, formerly Department of Social Services
- Local Emergency Financial Assistance Loan Board

== Former departments ==
- Michigan Department of Career Development
- Michigan Department of Commerce
- Department of Civil Service
- Department of Community Health
- Michigan Department of History, Arts and Libraries
- Michigan Department of Information Technology
- Michigan Department of Licensing and Regulation, abolished by Governor Engler with most of the department transfer to the Department of Commerce until Commerce was split up with the former L&R powers transferred to the Department of Consumer and Industry Services
- Michigan Department of Labor
- Michigan Department of Mental Health
- Department of the Michigan Jobs Commission
- Michigan Department of Public Health
- Michigan Railroad Commission
- Michigan State Land Office
- Michigan Department of Social Services
