= Michigan History Museum =

Coordinates: 42.7322°N 84.5630°W

- Established: 1989; 37 years ago
- Location: 702 West Kalamazoo Street; Lansing, Michigan, United States
- Type: State museum History museum
- Owner: Michigan Department of Natural Resources
- Website: mi.gov/mhm

The Michigan History Museum (MHM) is the state history museum of the U.S. state of Michigan. Opened in March 1989, it is located in the Michigan Library and Historical Center building in downtown Lansing, two blocks west of the Michigan State Capitol building. The museum is administered by the Michigan History Center under the Michigan Department of Natural Resources.

The museum features the life, land, and people of the state of Michigan. It focuses on the state's social and cultural heritage. Exhibits include displays on Native American life, the history of Euro-American traders and settlement, key industries such as logging and automobiles, and the role of Michigan in World War I and World War II.

== Description ==
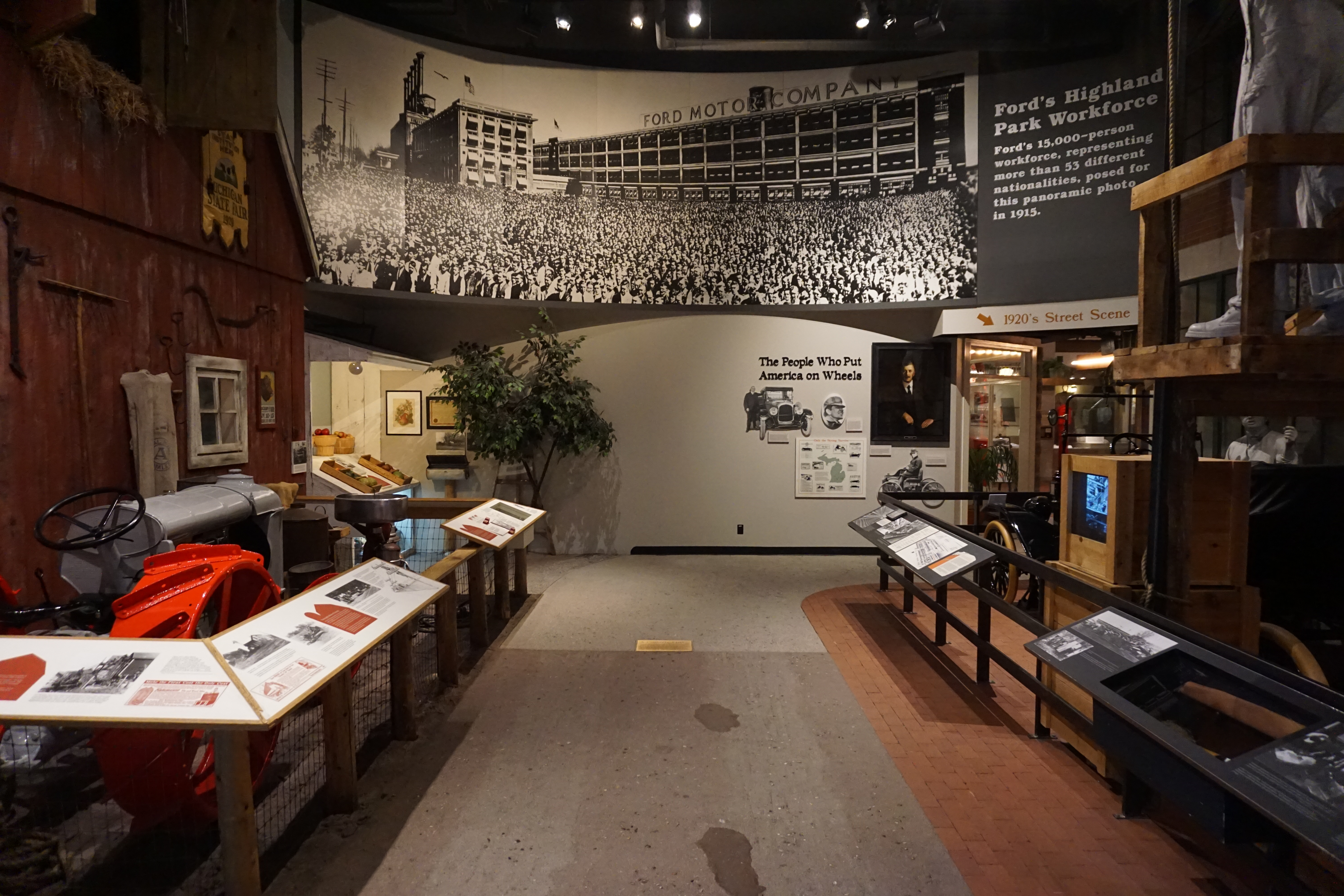
"Michigan in the 20th Century" exhibit in the Michigan History Museum

The Michigan History Museum opened in March 1989 as a constituent element of the Michigan Library and Historical Center. The Library and Historical Center physically consolidates four elements—the History Museum, the Library of Michigan, the Michigan State Archives, and the Michigan Law Library—under one roof with a common parking lot. The center is a part of the overall Michigan Capitol Complex, the group of state-owned buildings that adjoins the Michigan State Capitol. The Michigan History Museum is the flagship facility of the Michigan History Museum System, a 12-site state bureau that operates a variety of publicly interpreted historical museums and locations throughout Michigan.

Following the 2009 elimination of the Michigan Department of History, Arts and Libraries by Michigan governor Jennifer M. Granholm through Executive Order No. 2009-43, the Michigan History Museum and its parent Michigan History Center were transferred to the Michigan Department of Natural Resources for management.

The Michigan History Museum has a press outreach program as of 2024, and actively encourages visitation by state residents and tourists. The museum operates a program of rotating exhibits and visitation events. A parking fee and separate admission fee are charged.
