= Michigan Arts and Culture Council =

Agency overview
- Formed: 1966; 60 years ago
- Preceding agencies: State Council for the Arts; Michigan Council for Arts and Cultural Affairs
- Jurisdiction: Michigan
- Headquarters: Lansing, Michigan
- Parent agency: Michigan Strategic Fund
- Key document: State Council for the Arts Act 48 of 1966
- Website: michiganbusiness.org/macc

The Michigan Arts and Culture Council (MACC), formerly known as the Michigan Council for Arts and Cultural Affairs from 1991 to 2022, is a state government entity that administers arts and culture grants for the state of Michigan, operating independently under the Michigan Strategic Fund. Originally founded in 1966 through the State Council for the Arts Act 48 of 1966, the council is located in Lansing, Michigan.

== History ==
The council was originally founded in 1966 as the State Council for the Arts within the Michigan Department of Administration through the State Council for the Arts Act 48 of 1966.

In 1991, after John Engler assumed Michigan governorship, a renaming of the council was performed: the council was abolished as an agency under the Michigan Department of Administration through gubernatorial Executive Reorganization Order No. 1991-13, and simultaneously recreated as the Michigan Council for Arts and Cultural Affairs within the Michigan Department of Commerce through gubernatorial Executive Reorganization Order No. 1991-18.

Following the 2009 elimination of the Michigan Department of History, Arts and Libraries by Michigan governor Jennifer M. Granholm through Executive Order No. 2009-43, the Michigan Council for Arts and Cultural Affairs was transferred to the Michigan Strategic Fund for management.

In 2022, Michigan governor Gretchen Whitmer announced Michigan Council for Arts and Cultural Affairs changed name to the Michigan Arts and Culture Council through gubernatorial Executive Reorganization Order No. 2022-1. In 2024, the council was authorized to exercise certain authority, powers, duties, functions, and responsibilities independently of the Michigan Strategic Fund under Executive Reorganization Order No. 2024-2, signed by Michigan governor Gretchen Whitmer, effective September 17, 2024.

== Grants ==
In 2025, the Michigan Arts and Culture Council offered approximately 800 grants totaling $10.4 million to arts initiatives throughout the state.

As of 2026, dozens of northern Michigan arts and culture organizations are awaiting confirmation on the continuation of the grant programs.
