= Government of Michigan =

Executive, legislative, and judicial governing bodies of the US state of Michigan

- Great Seal of the State of Michigan
- Part of: United States
- Constitution: Constitution of Michigan

Legislative branch
- Name: Michigan Legislature
- Type: Bicameral
- Meeting place: Michigan State Capitol
- Upper house
- Name: Senate
- Presiding officer: Garlin Gilchrist, President
- Lower house
- Name: House of Representatives
- Presiding officer: Matt Hall, Speaker

Executive branch
- Head of state and government
- Title: Governor
- Currently: Gretchen Whitmer
- Appointer: Election
- Cabinet
- Leader: Governor
- Deputy leader: Lieutenant Governor
- Headquarters: George W. Romney Building

Judicial branch
- Name: Judiciary of Michigan
- Courts: Courts of Michigan
- Michigan Supreme Court
- Chief judge: Megan Cavanagh
- Seat: Lansing

Michigan has a republican form of government with three branches of government: the executive branch consisting of the governor of Michigan and the other independently elected constitutional officers; the legislative branch consisting of the House of Representatives and Senate; and the judicial branch consisting of the one court of justice. The state also allows direct participation of the electorate by initiative, referendum, recall, and ratification.

== Legislative branch ==
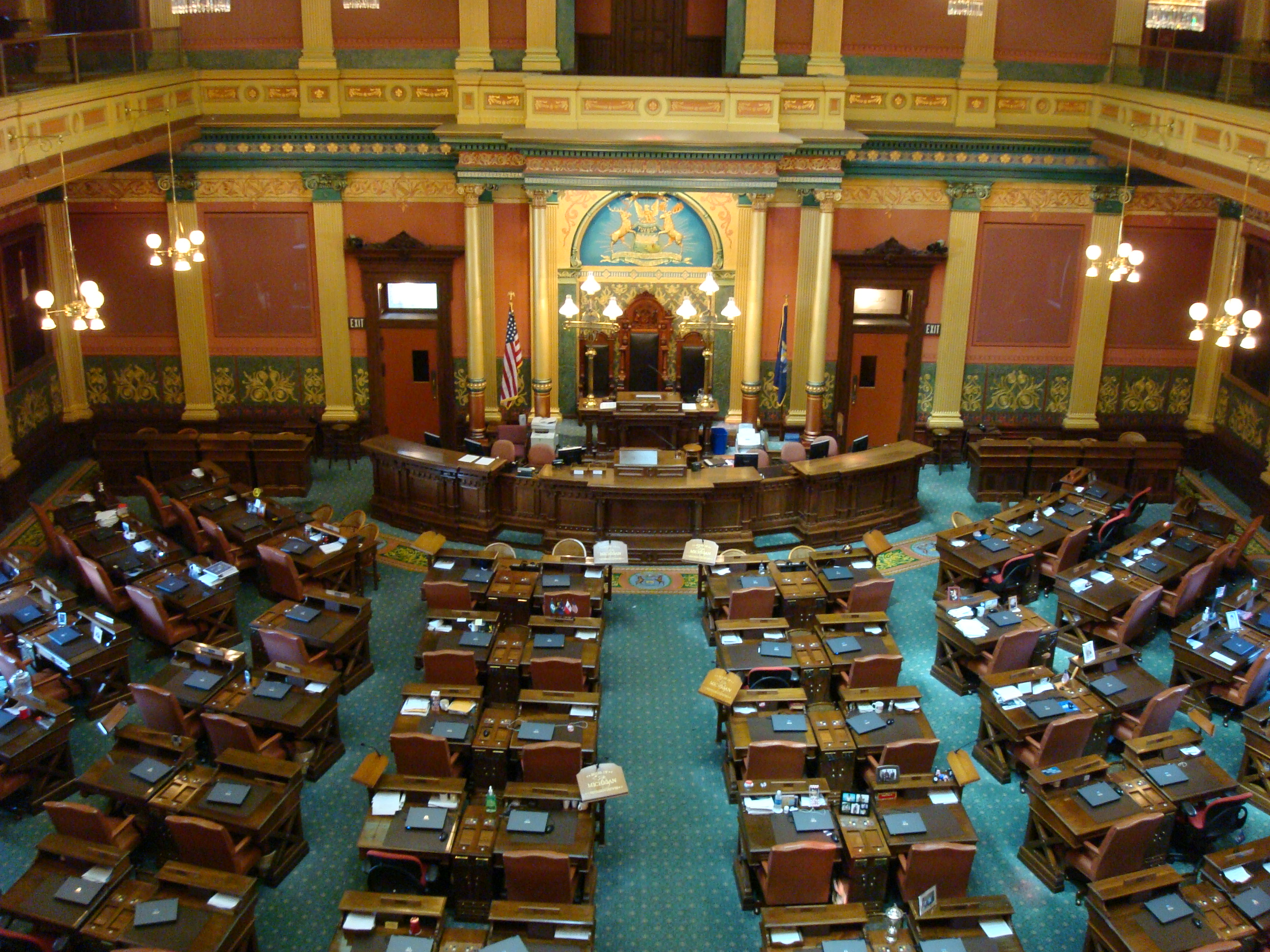
The House Chamber of the Michigan State Capitol in Lansing

The Michigan Legislature is the state legislature of the U.S. state of Michigan. It is organized as a bicameral institution consisting of the Senate, the upper house, and the House of Representatives, the lower house. Article IV of the Michigan Constitution, adopted in 1963, defines the role of the legislature and how it is to be constituted. Legislative acts are published in the official Acts of the Legislature and codified in the Michigan Compiled Laws. The Michigan Legislature meets in the Michigan State Capitol in Lansing, Michigan. Michigan is one of ten states to have a full-time legislature.

- State Officers Compensation Commission

The state officers compensation commission, consisting of seven governor appointed members, exists to set salaries for the governor and other elected officials, unless a two-thirds majority in both legislative chambers turned it down.

- Independent redistricting commission

The independent redistricting commission draws up legislative and congressional districts after each census. The 13 non-office holding members consisting of five independent members, four self-declared Democrats and four self-declared Republicans, would be selected randomly by the secretary of state from submitted applications.

A Commission on legislative apportionment was written into the 1963 state constitution. However, the same state constitution provided for land weighting factors for state senatorial districts. Such weighting factors were found unconstitutional by the United States Supreme Court in Reynolds v Sims (1964) for violating the Equal Protection Clause of the United States Constitution. Because land weighting factors were interdependent and not severable from the commission on legislative apportionment, the commission was also invalidated by the Supreme Court's decision in Reynolds v Sims (1964). This commission was transferred to the Department of State under the Executive Organization Act OF 1965. The state legislature has apportioned districts after census until 2020 as the November 6, 2018 general election proposal 2 created a constitutional independent redistricting commission.

== Executive branch ==
Michigan's elected executive officers are:

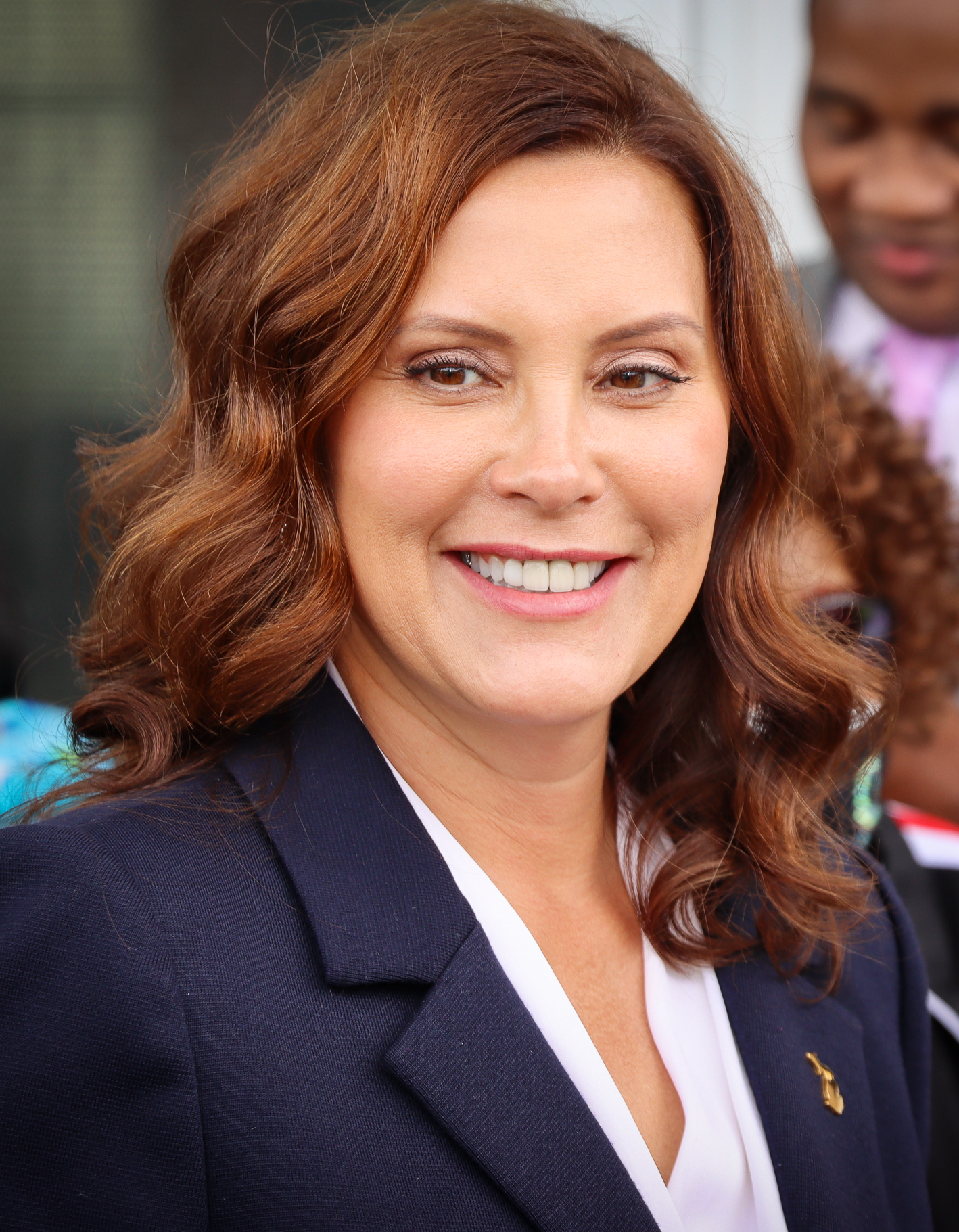
Gretchen Whitmer (D)
Governor

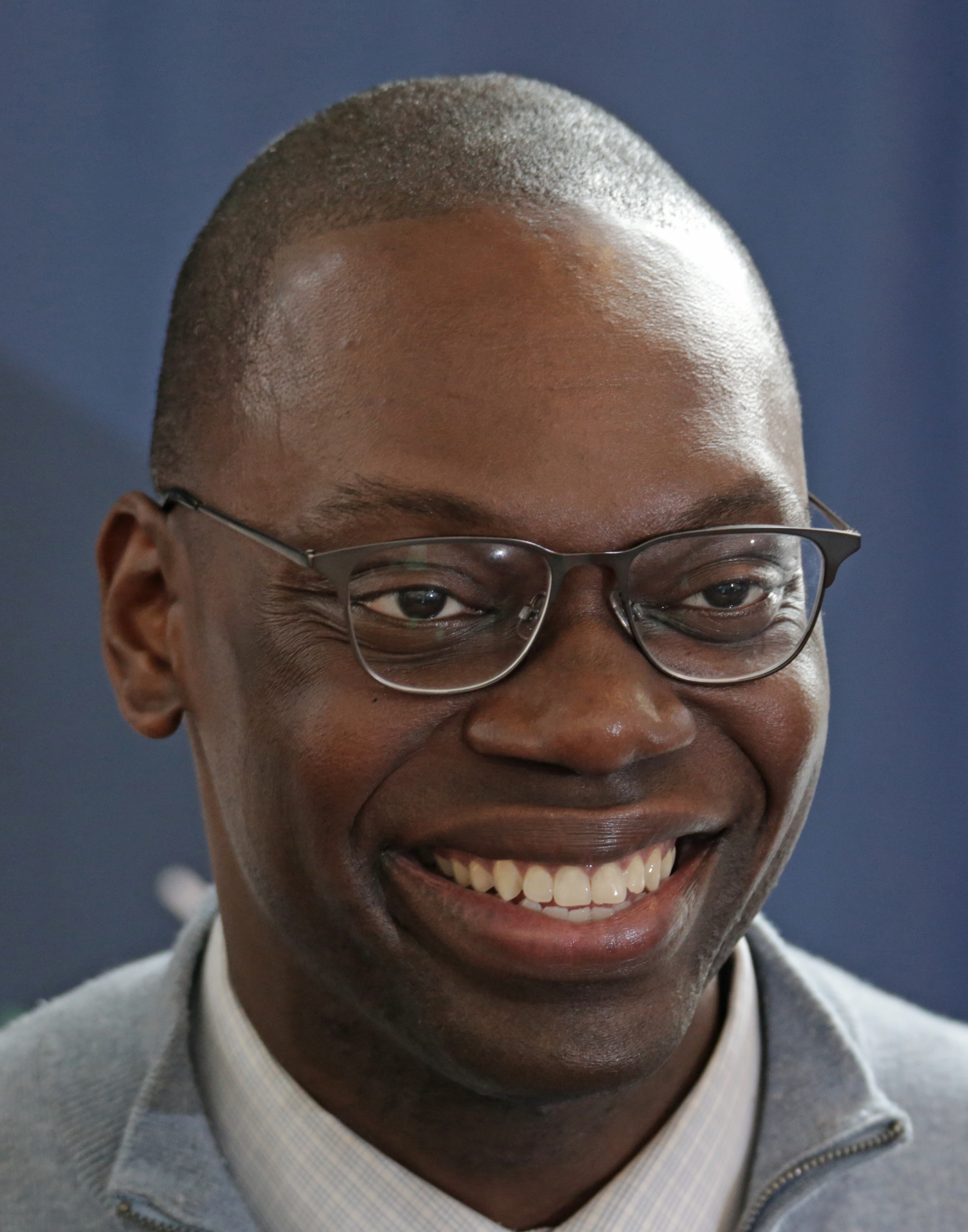
Garlin Gilchrist (D)
Lieutenant Governor

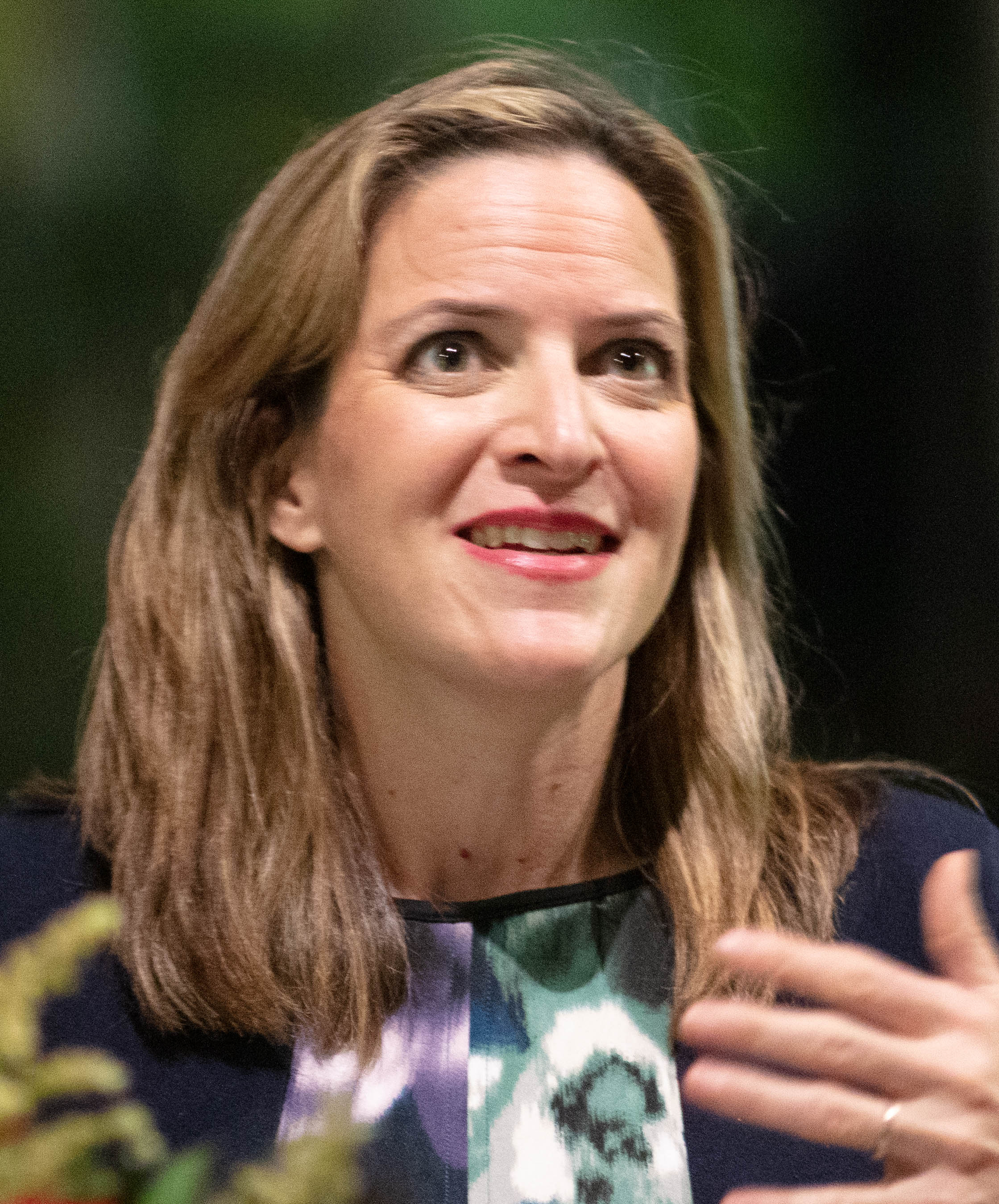
Jocelyn Benson (D)
Secretary of State

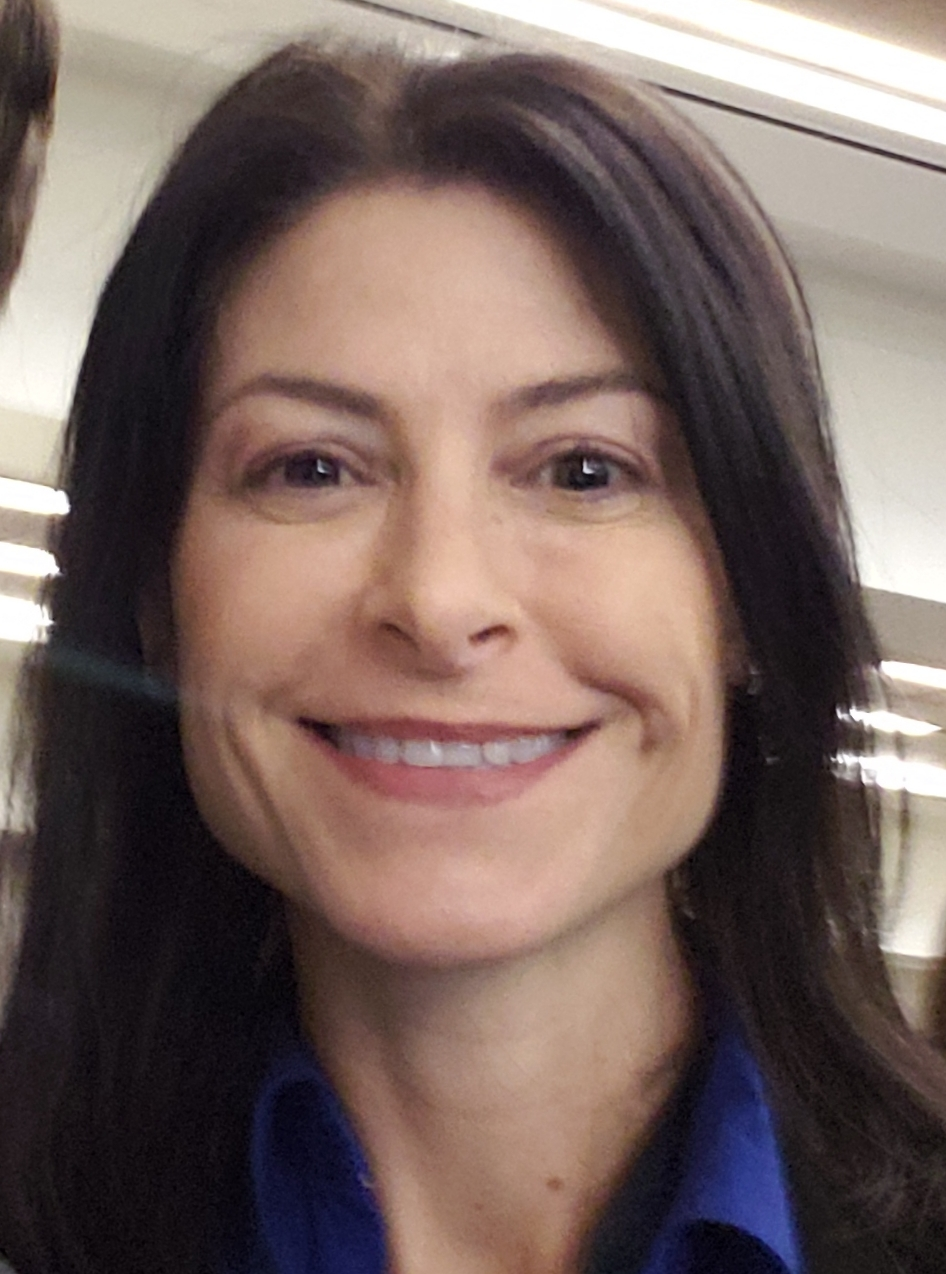
Dana Nessel (D)
Attorney General

For elected single person executives, term limits of two terms were put into place in 1993. Since 1966, the lieutenant governor is elected with the governor on the same ticket. The lieutenant governor is the president of the Michigan Senate and acts as the governor when the governor is unable to execute the office, including whenever the governor leaves the state. The governor is the principal executive officer with the power of veto, appointment, reorganize executive government, budget proposal and other powers.

The two other elected constitutional executives of the state are the secretary of state and attorney general. Both are elected separately for four-year terms concurrently with the governor/lieutenant governor slate. The elected officeholders are second and third in the line of succession respectively and may act as governor during disabilities or absences from the state. The attorney general is the state's chief law enforcement officer, executive agencies legal counsel and leads the Department of the Attorney General. The secretary of state and its department handles automobile-related licensing, elections and record holding.

=== Departments ===
The 1963 Constitution requires that all permanent agencies or commissions, except universities, be assigned to one of a maximum of 20 principal departments. The principal departments are the Department of:

- Agriculture and Rural Development
- Attorney General
- Civil Rights
- Corrections
- Education
- Environment, Great Lakes, and Energy
- Health and Human Services
- Insurance and Financial Services
- Licensing and Regulatory Affairs
- Military and Veterans Affairs
- Natural Resources
- State
- State Police
- Labor and Economic Opportunity
- Lifelong Education, Advancement, and Potential
- Technology, Management and Budget
- Transportation
- Treasury

Type 1 agencies are under the administration of the agency but operate independently of the principal department in carrying out its function and in most cases created by a type 1 transfer. Regulations are published in the Michigan Register (MR) and codified in the Michigan Administrative Code (MAC or AC).

=== Education ===
The state board of Education is a statewide elected board that head the Michigan Department of Education which oversees all education except that of the state universities.

Michigan's state universities are immune from control by the legislature, many aspects of the executive branch, and cities in which they are located; but they are not immune from the authority of the courts. Some degree of political control is exercised as the legislature approves appropriations for the schools. Furthermore, the governor appoints the board of control of most state universities with the advice and consent of the state Senate. Only the board members of the University of Michigan, Michigan State University, and Wayne State University are chosen in general elections.

=== Medical Marijuana ===
In Michigan, medical and recreational cannabis is regulated by the Michigan Cannabis Regulatory Agency, formerly called the Marijuana Regulatory Agency. Initially, when the law was passed, the state ran a Bureau of Marijuana Regulation within the Department of Licensing and Regulatory Affairs.

== Judicial branch ==
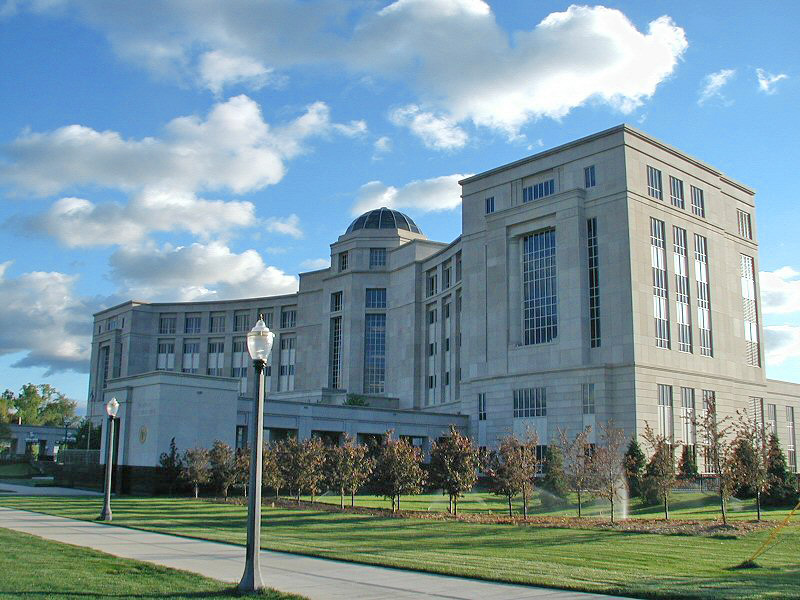
The Michigan Hall of Justice in Lansing

The court system consists of the Michigan Supreme Court, the Michigan Court of Appeals as the intermediate appellate court, the circuit courts and district courts as the two primary trial courts, and several administrative courts and specialized courts. The Supreme Court administers all the courts. The Michigan Supreme Court consists of seven members who are elected on non-partisan ballots for staggered eight-year terms, while state appellate court judges are elected to terms of six years and vacancies are filled by an appointment by the governor, and circuit court and district court judges are elected to terms of six years.

== Local government ==
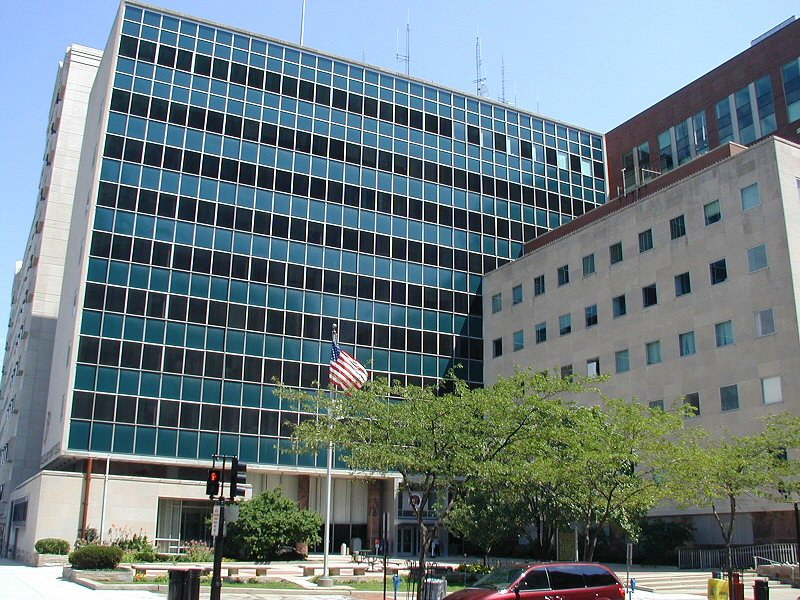
Lansing City Hall

Michigan is largely divided in the same way as many other U.S. states, but is distinct in its usage of charter townships. Michigan ranks 13th among the 50 states in terms of the number of local governmental entities.

The state is divided into 83 counties, and further divided into 1,240 townships, 276 cities, and 257 villages. Additionally, the state consists of 553 school districts, 57 intermediate school districts, 14 planning and development regions, and over 300 special districts and authorities.

=== County government ===
Michigan has home rule for counties, meaning there is flexibility for the organization of county government and number of elected officials.

Some common elected officials include:

- County Commissioners
- County Clerk
- County Treasurer
- Sheriff
- Prosecuting Attorney
- Register of Deeds
- Drain Commissioner

== See also ==
- Politics of Michigan
- Elections in Michigan
- Law of Michigan
