= Sherylyn Briller =

American anthropologist

Sherylyn H. Briller (born September 19, 1968) is an American cultural anthropologist, who specializes in medical anthropology and applied anthropology. Briller is a professor of anthropology, a faculty associate for the Center on Aging and the Life Course (CALC), an affiliated faculty in the Critical Disabilities Studies Program, and an instructor for the Design and Innovation minor at Purdue University. Briller's research focuses on the cross-cultural study of health, aging, disability and end-of-life issues in Mongolia and various parts of the United States. She has completed work as a researcher and consultant for various public and private organizations, including the Michigan Department of Health and Human Services and Cultural Keys, LLC.

Her research studying health and aging has been published in numerous academic journals that focus on health, gerontology, and cultural studies. She has co-authored a book series titled Creating Successful Dementia Care Settings (2001) and co-edited End of Life Stories: Crossing Disciplinary Boundaries (2005). Her most recent co-authored book, Designing An Anthropological Career: Professional Development Exercise (2009), provides a series of exercises to encourage students to identify their career goals.

== Biography ==
Briller received a bachelor's degree in Sociology & Anthropology from Carleton College in 1989. She completed her graduate studies at Case Western Reserve University where she earned a Master of Arts in anthropology (1992), a Center on Aging & Health Graduate Certificate in Gerontology (1993), and a Doctorate of Philosophy in Anthropology (2000). Her doctoral research examined the impact of family and government support on elder-care in Mongolia. She found that retired, rural Mongolians reported high levels of overall life satisfaction when they had familial support and governmental support in the form of pensions.

During the completion of her doctoral work, Briller served as a consultant for numerous gerontological organizations and a lecturer at Wayne State University. Upon completion of her degree, she accepted a faculty position at Wayne State University as an assistant professor in anthropology and faculty associate in the Institute for Gerontology. While a professor at Wayne State University, Briller continued to work as an applied anthropologist studying health and aging.

In 2014, she became a professor of anthropology at Purdue University. Briller has assisted with the development and expansion of the Applied and Practicing Anthropology program. Additionally, she serves as a faculty associate in the Center on Aging & the Life Course (CALC), an affiliated faculty in the Critical Disabilities Studies Program, and an instructor for the Design and Innovation minor at Purdue University.

== Scholarship ==
Briller's research focuses on gerontology, applied and practicing anthropology, and medical anthropology with an emphasis on the interdisciplinary study of aging, disability, human-centered design, and global health. She has published over 20 peer-reviewed articles on her research and co-edited one academic book, End of Life Stories: Crossing Disciplinary Boundaries (2005). She has co-authored five academic volumes, including Creating Successful Dementia Care Settings (2001) series — a four-volume book series on dementia care settings. These volumes are described as providing "useful, implementable advice" in the form of a"rich collection of suggested starting point" to address the connection between dementia care and the physical environment. Her most recent book, Designing An Anthropological Career: Professional Development Exercise (2009), has been described as "a practical, how‐to guide for job‐seeking anthropology majors that does well to present information that will help students think about, and talk their way into, their future careers".

Briller co-founded of the Space for Practice along with her colleagues, Zoe Nyssa, a professor in the department of anthropology at Purdue University, and Elizabeth K. Briody, a consultant from Cultural Keys, LLC and affiliate faculty member of anthropology at Purdue University. The Space for Practice is an applied anthropology lab at Purdue University whose "purpose is to facilitate applied anthropology pedagogy and to provide programming to foster student-practitioner interactions and networking". This lab provides students with hands-on experience working on applied anthropological projects and interaction with professionals and consultants who work in public and practicing anthropology.

== Applied work ==
Briller is an active member of several national organizations, including the Society for Applied Anthropology, the National Association of Practicing Anthropology, the Consortium for Practicing and Applied Anthropology Programs, and the Association for Anthropology, Gerontology, and the Life-Course. In 2018, she was elected as president of Society for Applied Anthropology. She is the former president of the Association for Anthropology, Gerontology, and the Life-Course and chair of the Consortium for Practicing and Applied Anthropology Programs.

In addition to her academic scholarship, Briller is an active practicing anthropologist. In 2014, she co-developed a community-engaged medical anthropology museum exhibit titled "Follow the Lines: Environmental Legacy, Health & Fishing the Detroit River" at the Gordon L. Grosscup Museum of Anthropology (Wayne State University). The exhibit was based on her work studying Detroit urban fishermen and explored the cultural significance of urban fishing along the Detroit River. This work occurred in partnership with the Michigan Department of Community Health, the Centers for Disease Control and Prevention, and the Environmental Protection Agency.

Currently, Briller serves as a professional consultant for Cultural Keys, LLC — a firm that helps companies and non-profit organizations diagnose and solve organizational and cultural issues.

== Publications ==
- Briody, Elizabeth K.; Briller, Sherylyn H. (October 2017). "Pursuing a Desired Future: Continuity and Change in a Long-Term-Care Community". Journal of Applied Gerontology. 36 (10): 1197–1227. doi:10.1177/0733464815608496. PMID 26442522. S2CID 11075918.
- Briller, Sherylyn; Sankar, Andrea (May 2013). "Engaging Opportunities In Urban Revitalization: Practicing Detroit Anthropology". Annals of Anthropological Practice. 37 (1): 156–178. doi:10.1111/napa.12022.
- Briller, Sherylyn; Sankar, Andrea (2011). "The Changing Roles of Ritual in Later Life". Generations: Journal of the American Society on Aging. 35 (3): 6–10. JSTOR 26555787.
- Briller, S. & Goldmacher, A. (2009) Designing An Anthropological Career: Professional Development Exercises. Walnut Creek, CA: AltaMira Press.
- Meert, Kathleen L.; Briller, Sherylyn H.; Myers Schim, Stephanie; Thurston, Celia; Kabel, Allison (19 August 2009). "Examining the Needs of Bereaved Parents in the Pediatric Intensive Care Unit: A Qualitative Study". Death Studies. 33 (8): 712–740. doi:10.1080/07481180903070434. PMID 19697483. S2CID 205584682.
- Meert, Kathleen L.; Briller, Sherylyn H.; Schim, Stephanie Myers; Thurston, Celia S. (November 2008). "Exploring parents' environmental needs at the time of a child's death in the pediatric intensive care unit*". Pediatric Critical Care Medicine. 9 (6): 623–628. doi:10.1097/PCC.0b013e31818d30d5. PMID 18838930. S2CID 27167809.
- Gelfand, D. E., Raspa, R., Briller, S.H. and Schim, S.M., eds. (2005) End-of-Life Stories: Crossing Disciplinary Boundaries. New York: Springer.
- Proffitt, M. and Briller, S. (2002) The Unit's Edge: Exploring the Boundary Between Public and Private Domains in Residential Settings for Older Persons. Milwaukee, WI: University of Wisconsin Milwaukee Center for Architecture & Urban Planning Research Publishers.
- Briller, S. Proffitt, M., Perez, K. and Calkins,.M.P. (2001) Understanding the Environment Through Aging Senses, Vol. 2. In M. P. Calkins, Creating Successful Dementia Care Settings (series). Baltimore, MD: Health Professions Press.
- Briller, S., Proffitt, M., Perez, K. and Calkins, M.P.(2001) Maximizing Cognitive and Functional Abilities, Vol. 3. In M. P. Calkins, Creating Successful Dementia Care Settings (series). Baltimore, MD: Health Professions Press.
- Marsden, J.P, Briller, S., Calkins, M.P. and Proffitt, M. (2001) Enhancing Self and Sense of Home, Vol. 4. In M. P. Calkins, Creating Successful Dementia Care Settings (series). Baltimore, MD: Health Professions Press.
- Briller, S (1997). "Out in the Cold: Mongolia Grapples with its First Generation of Street Children". Natural History. 106 (6): 24–32.
