= Judiciary of Michigan =

Court system of Michigan, USA

The judiciary of Michigan is defined under the Michigan Constitution, law, and regulations as part of the Government of Michigan. The court system consists of the Michigan Supreme Court, the Michigan Court of Appeals as the intermediate appellate court, the circuit courts and district courts as the two primary trial courts, and several administrative courts and specialized courts. The Supreme Court administers all the courts. The Michigan Supreme Court consists of seven members who are elected on non-partisan ballots for staggered eight-year terms, while state appellate court judges are elected to terms of six years and vacancies are filled by an appointment by the governor, and circuit court and district court judges are elected to terms of six years.

== Courts ==
The court system consists of the Michigan Supreme Court, the Michigan Court of Appeals as the intermediate appellate court; the circuit courts, district courts, and probate courts as the primary trial courts; and several administrative courts and specialized courts.

=== Supreme Court ===
The Supreme Court hears appeals from the Court of Appeals and administers all of the courts. The Michigan Supreme Court consists of seven members. The Supreme Court has original jurisdiction only in narrow circumstances, but holds appellate jurisdiction over the entire state judicial system. The state Supreme Court makes decisions via a majority. The court was founded in 1835.

=== Court of Appeals ===
The Court of Appeals hears all appeals from the circuit courts and, in some cases, directly from the probate courts. Although judges are elected by four separate districts, they serve in panels together, and decisions are binding statewide. Cases are heard by the Court of Appeals by panels of three judges, who examine the application of the law and not the facts of the case, unless there has been grievous error pertaining to questions of fact.

=== Circuit courts ===
The circuit courts hear the more serious criminal cases. In addition, they are the appellate court for cases heard in the district courts. There are 57 circuit courts in the State of Michigan, which have original jurisdiction over all civil suits where the amount contended in the case exceeds $25,000 and all criminal cases involving felonies. Circuit courts are also the only trial courts in the State of Michigan which possess the power to issue equitable remedies. Circuit courts have appellate jurisdiction from district and municipal courts, as well as from decisions and decrees of state agencies. Most counties have their own circuit court, but sparsely populated counties often share them.

=== District courts ===
The district courts hears cases involving less serious criminal offenses. District courts are trial courts of limited jurisdiction, handling most traffic violations, small claims, misdemeanors, and civil suits where the amount contended is below $25,000. District courts are often responsible for handling the preliminary examination and for setting bail in felony cases.

=== Probate courts ===
There is a probate court for every county, except for ten counties that are part of five probate court districts.

=== Municipal courts ===
Nearly all cities in the state have ceased operating a municipal court, except for the five Grosse Pointes in Wayne County; each has its own municipal court, except for Grosse Pointe Woods and Grosse Pointe Shores, which operate one jointly.

== Administration ==
The Supreme Court oversees the operations of all state trial courts, with broad superintending control power over all the state courts in Michigan. It is assisted by the Michigan State Court Administrative Office. The court's responsibilities also include a public comment process for changes to court rules, rules of evidence and other administrative matters.

== Personnel ==
=== Judges ===
The Michigan Supreme Court consists of seven members who are elected for staggered eight-year terms. While candidates for, and members of, the Michigan Supreme Court are considered non-partisan, major parties must nominate potential members of the court. State appellate court judges are elected to terms of six years, but vacancies are filled by an appointment by the governor. Circuit court and district court judges are elected to terms of six years.

The Michigan Judicial Tenure Commission is an agency within the judiciary having jurisdiction over allegations of judicial misconduct, misbehavior, and infirmity. The Supreme Court is given original, superintending control power, and appellate jurisdiction over the issue of penalty (up to and including removal of judges from office).

=== Attorneys ===
The Supreme Court hears cases of attorney misconduct.

== History ==
The Court of Chancery was the court with jurisdiction in cases of equity between 1836 and 1847, presided over by a Chancellor. In certain cases, appeal could be made to the Michigan Supreme Court. The law creating the Court of Chancery took effect July 4, 1836 and it was abolished on March 1, 1847, with its jurisdiction given to the circuit courts.

The Recorder's Court was a state court of limited jurisdiction which had, for most of its history, exclusive jurisdiction over traffic and ordinance matters and all felony cases committed in Detroit. Its jurisdiction did not extend to civil suits. It was merged into the Wayne County Circuit Court following the pattern of the rest of the state of Michigan in October 1997.

== See also ==
- Government of Michigan
- Law of Michigan
- Law enforcement in Michigan
