= Beverly Walker-Griffea =

1st Director of the Michigan Department of Lifelong Education, Advancement, and Potential
- Incumbent
- Assumed office June 24, 2024
- Governor: Gretchen Whitmer
- Preceded by: Michelle Richard (interim)

Personal details
- Born: Tulsa, Oklahoma, U.S.
- Education: Oklahoma State University; Virginia State University; Texas Woman's University

Beverly Walker-Griffea is an American public official and academic administrator serving as the director of the Michigan Department of Lifelong Education, Advancement, and Potential since 2024. She is the president emeritus of Mott Community College.

== Life ==
Walker-Griffea was born in Tulsa, Oklahoma and raised in North Tulsa. Her mother was a teacher and her father a pastor. She earned a B.S. degree in radio, television, and film and public affairs at Oklahoma State University. She completed a M.Ed. in guidance and counseling at Virginia State University. Walker-Griffea received a Ph.D. in child development from Texas Woman's University.

Walker-Griffea was an academic counselor at Old Dominion University. She worked as the interim dean of health and environmental sciences at Spokane Community College. She was dean of student development at Houston Community College. In 2006, she became vice president for student affairs at Thomas Nelson Community College. She worked as the senior vice president for student services at Montgomery College from 2011 to 2014. On August 27, 2014, Walker-Griffea became seventh president of Mott Community College, succeeding Richard Shaink. She was the first woman and African American to serve in the role. In 2023, she was named the chief executive officer of the year by the American Association of Community Colleges. She retired on May 24, 2014, and was named president emeritus. In May 2024, Walker-Griffea was named by governor Gretchen Whitmer as the inaugural director of the Michigan Department of Lifelong Education, Advancement, and Potential (MiLEAP), succeeding interim director Michelle Richard. Her appointment begins on June 24, 2024.

== Controversy ==
In 2022 and 2023, while she was president of Mott Community College, Walker-Griffea commuted to campus from a home she owned in Virginia at the college's expense, staying in Michigan hotels and renting cars while she was in the state. That sort of arrangement was basically unheard of in higher education, according to James Finkelstein, an emeritus professor of public policy at George Mason University who studies the recruitment and employment of college presidents. Anne Figueroa, a former member of Mott’s Board of Trustees, defended the arrangement, saying the college had decided to undertake an extensive renovation of the president’s residence and Walker-Griffea had health concerns and was seeing doctors on the East Coast.
