= Library card =

Card to use various functions of a library

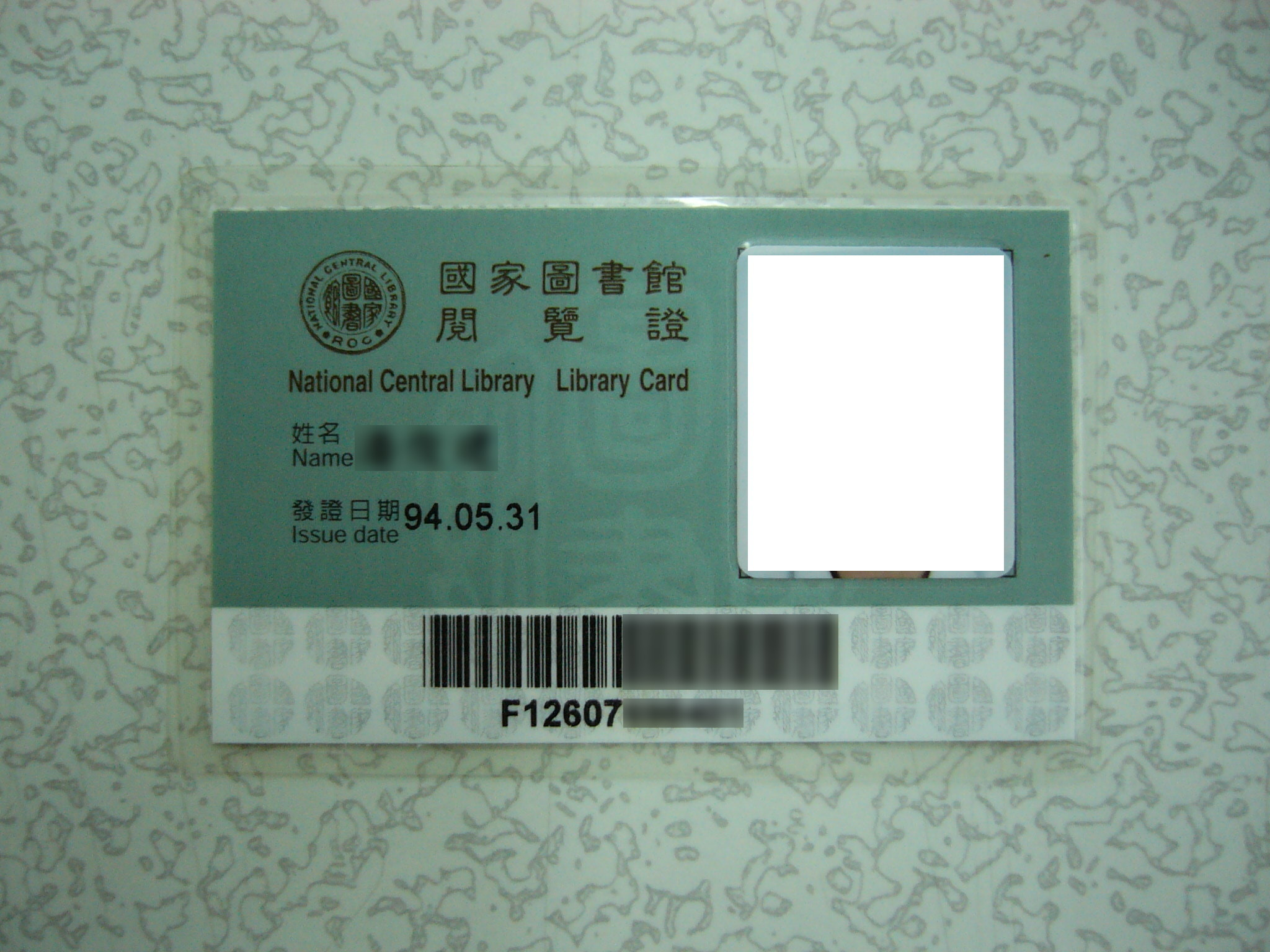
Library card for the National Central Library in Taiwan

A library card is part of an integrated library system which can refer to several cards traditionally used for the management of books and patrons in a library. In its most common use, a library card serves similar functions as a corporate membership card. A person who holds a library card has borrowing or other privileges associated with the issuing library. Library cards can grant the user much more than books such as museum admission, game controllers, DVDs and other media.

The library card also serves as a method of identification. When a person chooses an item to borrow and presents their library card to the library, they take responsibility for the borrowed item and promise to abide by certain rules, usually including a promise to return the item by the due date or face a library fine. If the cardholder violates these responsibilities, their borrowing privileges may be suspended.

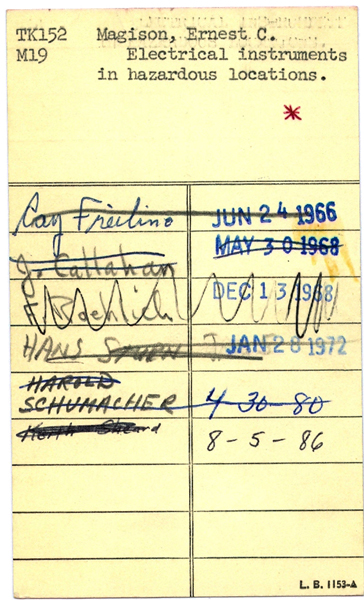
An example of a borrowing card, formerly in common use to track books

== Borrowing cards ==
"Library card" may also refer to the borrowing cards used to record book borrowing before the advent of computer systems. When a library book was prepared for lending, a borrowing card would be inserted into a small pocket in the front or back cover of the book. When a patron borrowed a book, their name and the book's due date would be recorded on the borrowing card, which would be filed under the patron's name or card number. In a manual circulation system, the borrowing card would be replaced with a stamped due date card to inform the patron of the item's due date. The book was then released to the patron. When the book was returned, the patron's name would be crossed off the borrowing card. The borrowing card would be placed back in the book which would then be shelved. In some libraries, this system of borrowing may still be in use.

== History ==
When the free library movement started in the 1840s, it became a more permanent practice to use a card system to keep track of what was being borrowed. In 1928, a patent was filed for one of the first library charging systems by Joseph J. Dickman. In 1932, the first electric book charging machine made by the Gaylord company. Its benefits being relatively low cost and easy to install without disrupting current library routines.

== See also ==
- MichiCard
- Codabar
- Integrated Library Systems
- Public Library
- Lending Library
