= Library of Michigan =

State library of Michigan, United States

Coordinates: 42.73221°N 84.56364°W

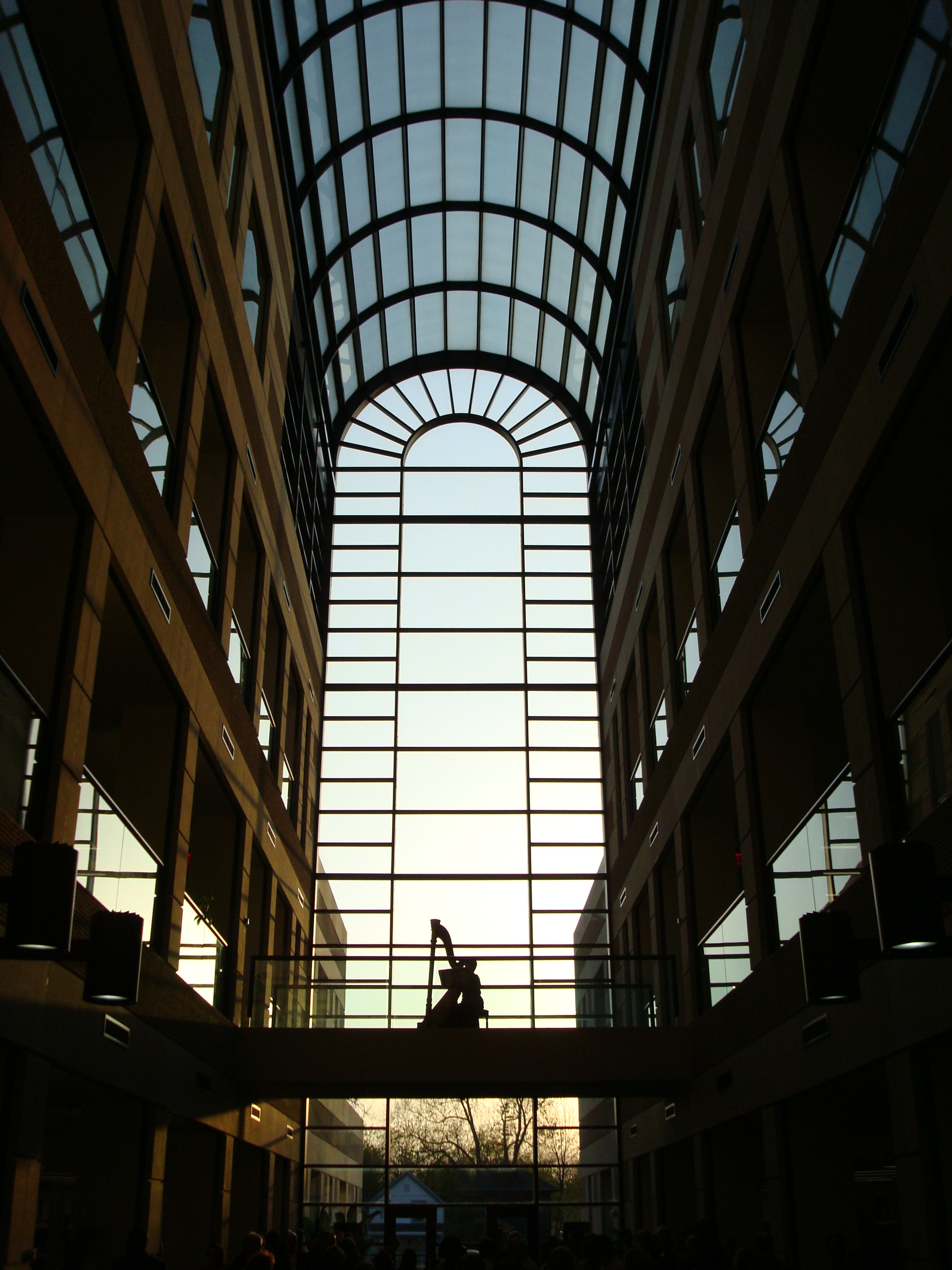
- The atrium of the Library of Michigan
- Location: Lansing, Michigan
- Type: State library
- Established: 1828; 198 years ago
- Reference to legal mandate: Library of Michigan Act of 1982

Other information
- Director: David Votta, Interim
- Employees: 33
- Parent organization: Michigan Department of Education
- Website: mi.gov/library

The Library of Michigan is the state library of the U.S. state of Michigan, located in the state capital, Lansing. Established in 1828, it is now housed in the 5-story Michigan Library and Historical Center building. The library's purpose is to collect and preserve Michigan publications, conduct reference and research, and support libraries statewide.

The Library of Michigan has been a division of the Michigan Department of Education since 2009, following the gubernatorial elimination of the Michigan Department of History, Arts and Libraries. A key service of the Library of Michigan is the Michigan eLibrary (MeL), one of the first online libraries on the Internet. MeL provides full-text articles, books, Michigan history materials, and evaluated web sites to residents of the state of Michigan.

The Michigan Library and Historical Center building also houses the Michigan History Museum, which is now administered by the Michigan History Center of the Michigan Department of Natural Resources. The Michigan History Museum includes permanent and seasonal exhibits on Michigan history, and is open to the public.

== History ==
In 1828, a territorial library was created containing laws and government documents for use by the territorial council, and William B. Hunt was appointed the territorial librarian. Nine years later, the former territorial library became the state library, and Governor Stevens T. Mason appointed Oren Marsh as the first state librarian.

In 1879, the state library moved to the new State Capitol in Lansing. It was originally a two-story room on the second and third floor in the west wing. The space is now the Speaker's Library on the second floor and the House Appropriations Committee room on the third floor.

A fire in the State Office Building where the library was housed in 1951 destroyed 20,000 books and damaged 30,000 more.

Public Act 540 of 1982 created the Library of Michigan and transferred control of the library from the Department of Education to the Legislative Council. Three years later, the Library of Michigan Foundation, which secures funds to support the library's priority programs and projects, was established.

In 1988, the Michigan Library and Historical Center opened, tripling the Library of Michigan's space and merging its full collection of books in one place for the first time since the 1951 fire. In 2001, the library was moved to the new Department of History, Arts and Libraries. After that department's abolition in 2009, the library was moved back to the Department of Education.

Following the 2009 elimination of the Michigan Department of History, Arts and Libraries by Michigan governor Jennifer M. Granholm through Executive Order No. 2009-43, the Library of Michigan and the state librarian were transferred to the Michigan Department of Education for management.

== Building ==
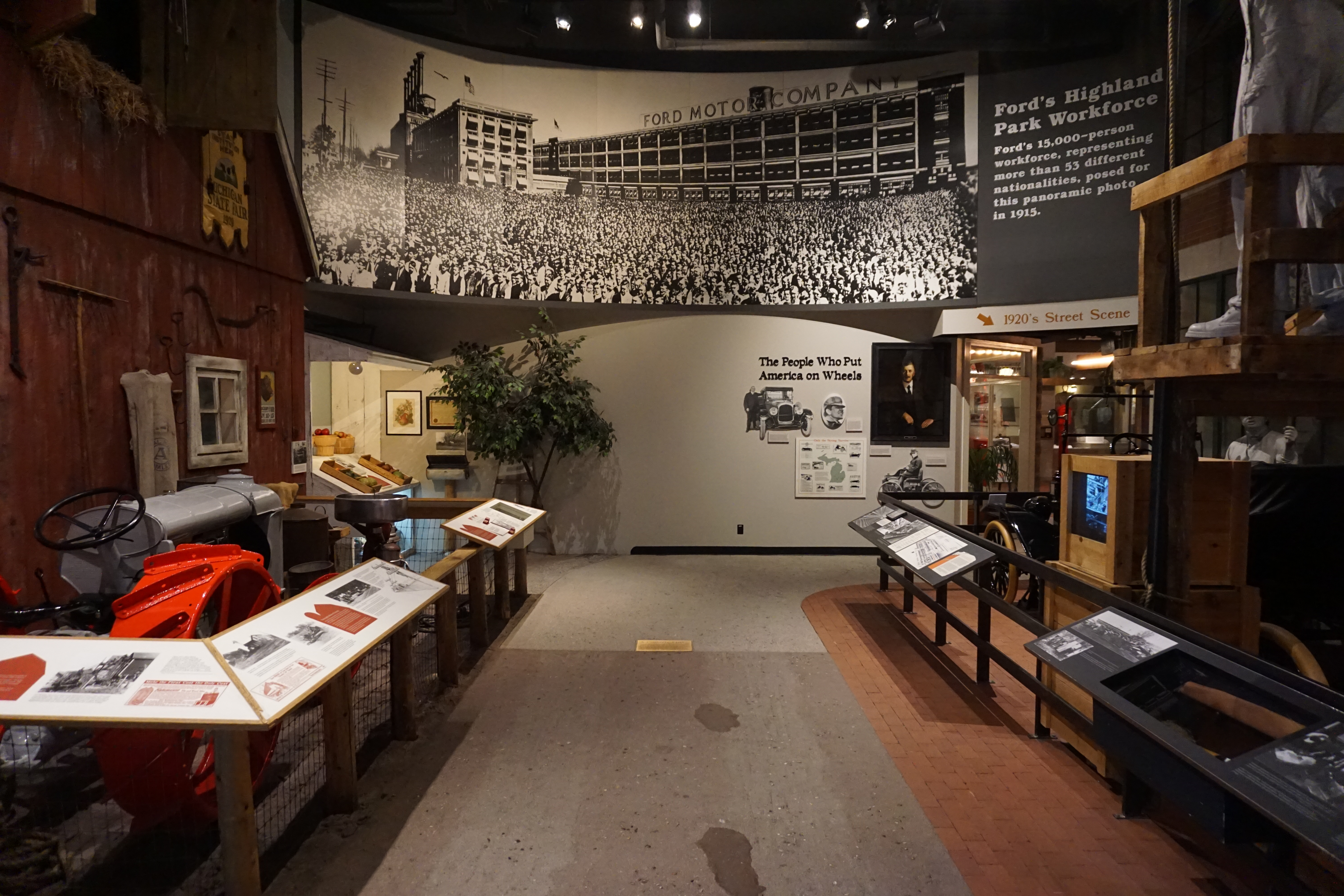
Michigan in the 20th Century exhibit in the Michigan History Museum

The Library of Michigan at 5 stories contains over 3.2 million different items that take up over 27 miles (43 km) of shelves. Opened in 1989, the Library of Michigan building also contains one of the ten largest genealogical collections in the United States. Another feature is a Michigan collection containing legal materials that date back centuries. Other features of the library and historical center include the Michigan History Museum, the Archives of Michigan, and newspapers on microfilm from papers all over the state. The State of Michigan Law Library moved to the building in the summer of 2007.

== Exhibitions and programs ==
The Library of Michigan hosts several exhibits each year that focus on the state's history and culture and are intended to encourage visitors to use the collections and services that the library offers. These exhibits are displayed in the Lake Erie Room and Rare Book Room Exhibit Area.

The institution also sponsors several awards and honors intended to recognize individuals who have made a visible impact in Michigan history and culture, as well as libraries that have gone above and beyond in serving their communities. Other examples of awards include the Michigan Author Award, a lifetime achievement award for significant Michigan authors, the Loleta Fyan Small and Rural Libraries Conference Awards, which recognizes small and rural libraries in Michigan, and the Michigan Notable Books Award (MNBA). Each year the WNBA recognizes the top 20 most notable books written about Michigan or the Great Lakes, by Michigan residents, or set in Michigan or the Great Lakes. Books can include and have historically included poetry, fiction, children's books, cookbooks, biographies, and graphic novels, and short story collections. Winners are decided by a committee of booksellers, librarians, and reviewers from the Library of Michigan.

== Past State Librarians ==
- William B. Hunt, 1828-1834
- Gershom Mott Williams, 1834-1836
- Kintzing Pritchette, 1836
- Calvin Charles Jackson 1837
- Oren Marsh, 1837-1840
- Moses B. Hess, 1847-1850
- Henry Tisdale, 1850-1851
- Charles J. Fox, 1851-1853
- Charles P. Bush, 1853-1854
- John J. Bush, 1854-1855
- Dewitt C. Leach, 1855-1857
- George W. Swift, 1857-1859
- Jesse Eugene Tenney, 1859-1869
- Harriet A. Tenney, 1869-1891
- Margaret Custer Calhoun, 1891-1893
- Mary C. Spencer, 1893-1923
- Mary E. Frankhauser, 1923-1933
- Evelyn S. Mershon, 1933
- Lillian S. Navarre, 1933-1935
- Grace S. McClure, 1935-1941
- Loleta D. Fyan, 1941-1961
- Genevieve M. Casey, 1962-1968
- Francis X. Scannell, 1968-1983
- James Wilson Fry, 1984-1994
- Library Staff (no official State Librarian), 1994-1996
- George M. Needham, 1996-1999
- Christie Pearson Brandau, 2000-2005
- Nancy R. Robertson, 2005-2014
- Randy Riley, 2014-2026
- Michelle Bradley, Interim, Feb. 2026-Jul. 2026
- David Votta, Interim, Jul. 2026-Oct. 2026
- David Votta, Oct. 16, 2026-present

== See also ==
- MichiCard
- List of libraries in the United States
