= American Association of Community Colleges =

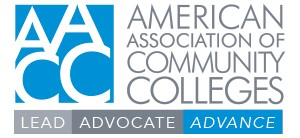
- Founded: 1920
- Headquarters: Washington D.C.
- Key people: Walter G. Bumphus, president
- Revenue: 20,171,308 United States dollar (2022)
- Total assets: 26,587,905 United States dollar (2022)
- Website: www.aacc.nche.edu

The American Association of Community Colleges (AACC), headquartered in the National Center for Higher Education building in Washington, D.C., is the primary advocacy organization for community colleges at the national level and works closely with directors of state offices to inform and affect state policy.

== About ==
In addition, AACC is a member of "The Six" large, presidentially based associations dealing with higher education policy, and it collaborates with a range of organizations within the higher education community to monitor and influence federal policy and to collaborate on issues of common interest. The association has ongoing interaction with key federal departments and agencies including the U.S. departments of Labor, Education, Energy, Homeland Security, and Commerce and the National Science Foundation.

The AACC represents nearly 1,200 two-year, associate degree-granting institutions that have an enrollment of more than 12 million students. The association's board of directors consist of 32 institutional members who serve three-year terms.

== History ==
AACC was founded in 1920, originally named American Association of Junior Colleges (AAJC). In 1972 the organization renamed itself to the American Association of Junior and Community Colleges (AACJC) and in 1992 to American Association of Community Colleges.

Since February of 2023, the AACC Board has elected, Tracy Hartzler, president of Central New Mexico Community College, Dawn Lindsay, president of Anne Arundel Community College, Charlotte Warren, president of Lincoln Land Community College, Jermaine Whirl, president of Augusta Technical College, and Lin Zhou, president of Bates Technical College.

The AACC announced that Drake State President, Dr. Patricia Sims, was elected to the AACC Board. In April of 2023, the AACC named Mott Community College President Beverly Walker-Griffea CEO of the Year. Dr. Willie E. Smith Sr., Baton Rouge Community College Chancellor, has been elected to serve as an institutional representative for the Board of Directors of the AACC.

In February 2025, the association’s president and chief executive officer, Walter G. Bumphus, announced he would be retiring at year’s end after 15 years leading AACC.

== Scholarships ==
The AACC awarded scholarships to the top twenty community college students. Each student received $5,000 and will be named the 2023 All-USA Academic Team.
