= St. Joseph Valley Railway (1889–1897) =

Railroad in Michigan

The St. Joseph Valley Railway (1889-1897), earlier known as the St. Joseph Valley Railroad (1880-1889), is a defunct railroad which operated in southern Michigan during the late 19th century. Intended to connect the Berrien County, Michigan communities of Buchanan and Berrien Springs with northern Indiana, the railroad never expanded beyond an initial connection between those two communities and sank under a weight of debt which poor traffic could not offset.

The company was formed by local businessmen from both Buchanan and Berrien Springs frustrated by insufficient railroad access. Berrien Springs, then the county seat, had no access at all, while Buchanan sat on the Michigan Central's Chicago–Detroit line but had no cross-county access, nor a direct line to Lake Michigan. The new company, which incorporated on January 27, 1880, proposed to construct a line south from Berrien Springs to Buchanan and on to the Indiana border, which would put the railroad a stone's throw from South Bend, then a major railroad hub. Lack of capital prompted the company to use a 3 ft (914 mm) narrow gauge instead of the more expensive, but more widely used 4 ft 8 1/2 in (1,435 mm) standard gauge.

Construction of the Berrien Springs–Buchanan segment began in July 1880, backed by local capital. The line was built along the west bank of the St. Joseph River; this eliminated the need for bridges but forced the line along a route marked by broken country and a sandy topography, conditions which the lines later problems with washouts after heavy rains bore witness. The 10-mile (16 km) line was finally opened for regular service on September 5, 1881.

From the start, the company was bedeviled by poor finances. The gauge mismatch inhibited cooperation with the Michigan Central, and the railroad's limited scope did not generate enough traffic to offset the weight of the company's debts. Attempts in 1883 and 1884 to extend the line south to Indiana went nowhere, while the company's physical plant deteriorated. Matters came to a head in 1886 when the Michigan Railroad Commission condemned the line as unsafe for passenger service. Lacking the funds to make the necessary repairs, on April 27, 1887 the company went into receivership. Michigan's railroad commissioner assessed the company's situation thus in 1887:

The St. Joseph Valley Railroad Company, operating a short narrow gauge road in Berrien county, between Buchanan and Berrien Springs, failing to keep its track and bridges in a condition of safety for traffic, the same were condemned for further use by my predecessor, until required repairs should be made. No effort appears to have been made in that direction. The company has made no report to the office for 1886, and it is understood has abandoned its property to its creditors, and that the company will be reörganized for further operations is improbable.

Indeed, the company remained in receivership for over two years, during which time it did not operate, until new investors bought the property on May 7, 1889. The reorganized company took the name St. Joseph Valley Railway. The new company rebuilt the line to standard gauge and ordered new rolling stock. Passenger service resumed on August 5, 1889. The new investors had intended to extend the line north to Benton Harbor, but the necessary financing fell through. Soon afterwards the line again changed hands, and continued to decline. In August 1893 the Michigan Railroad Commission again condemned the line; regular service had ceased the previous month. In 1894 an election transferred the county seat from Berrien Springs to St. Joseph; contemporary analysis laid much of the blame on the failure of the St. Joseph Valley Railway and corresponding lack of railroad service in Berrien Springs.

In 1897 a new company, the Milwaukee, Benton Harbor & Columbus, realized the old goal of the St. Joseph Valley and completed the 16-mile (26 km) line from Benton Harbor to Berrien Springs. At the same time the new company consolidated the St. Joseph, ending its tumultuous independent existence. The line, however, continued to be unprofitable, even under the management of the Pere Marquette, which bought the Milwaukee, Benton Harbor & Columbus and 1903. The Pere Marquette considered, but never built an extension to South Bend, and finally abandoned the line in 1922.
