= Michigan Occupational Safety and Health Administration =

US government agency

Agency overview
- Formed: 1974
- Minister responsible: (etc.)
- Agency executive: Barton G. Pickelman, CIH, Director
- Parent agency: Michigan Department of Labor and Economic Opportunity
- Key document: Michigan Occupational Safety and Health Act, Act 154 of 1974
- Website: michigan.gov/miosha

The Michigan Occupational Safety and Health Administration (MIOSHA) is a bureau of the Michigan Department of Labor and Economic Opportunity within the Michigan state government, responsible for regulating workplace safety and health in the state. It operates under a formal state-plan agreement with the federal Occupational Safety and Health Administration (OSHA).

MIOSHA is responsible for assuring safe and healthful working conditions for working men and women in Michigan. The agency administers the MIOSH Act, Act 154 of 1974, as amended. Safe and healthy work environments are achieved through a combination of enforcement, outreach, and collaborative partnerships. Also, the agency licenses asbestos contractors and certifies asbestos workers. The agency administers the MIOSHA program through an organization composed of the Construction Safety and Health Division, the General Industry Safety and Health Division, the Consultation Education and Training Division, the MIOSHA Appeals Division, the Management and Technical Services Division, and program administration.

MIOSHA applies to all public and private sector places of employment in the state, with the exception of federal employees, the United States Postal Service, domestic employment, maritime, and mining, which are subject to the federal OSHA jurisdiction.

== History ==
The Michigan Legislature created the modern Michigan Occupational Safety and Health Act, Public Act 154 of 1974, in order to better prevent workplace injuries, illnesses and fatalities in Michigan by: setting and enforcing occupational safety and health standards; promoting safety and health training and education; and working with partners to develop innovative programs to prevent workplace hazards. P.A. 154 went into effect for private sector employers on January 1, 1975, and for public sector employers on July 1, 1975.

The MIOSH Act established the General Industry Safety Standards Commission, the Construction Safety Standards Commission, and the Occupational Health Commission. The commissions are responsible for developing standards in consultation with advisory committees whose members represent the major interests affected by the proposed standard. The standards are intended to protect the health and safety of Michigan's employees.

MIOSHA was administered by the Michigan Department of Public Health, Occupational Health Division and the Michigan Department of Labor, Bureau of Safety and Regulation until 1996 when Governor John Engler issued Executive Order 1996-1 which transferred occupational health responsibilities to the Bureau of Safety and Regulation.

In September 2003, Governor Jennifer M. Granholm signed Executive Order 2003-14 creating the Department of Labor and Economic Growth. The department was created by renaming the Department of Consumer and Industry Services and merging many Department of Career Development functions into the new department along with several other key programs from other departments.

On December 8, 2003, the MIOSHA program reorganized its operational structure by creating the Management & Technical Services Division and combining enforcement divisions. The General Industry Safety Division, Construction Safety Division and the Occupational Health Division became the General Industry Safety & Health Division and the Construction Safety and Health Division. The MIOSHA Information Division became the Management Information Systems Section and the MIOSHA Standards Division became the MIOSHA Standards Section. Both are administered by the Management & Technical Services Division. The Employee Discrimination Division became the Employee Discrimination Section and is administered by the General Industry Safety and Health Division. The asbestos program is administered by the Construction Safety and Health Division. In addition, the program name changed from the Bureau of Safety and Regulation to the Michigan Occupational Safety and Health Administration (MIOSHA).

On December 28, 2008, Governor Jennifer M. Granholm signed Executive Order 2008-20 creating the Department of Energy, Labor & Economic Growth. The department was created by renaming the Department of Labor and Economic Growth and ensuring efficient administration and effectiveness of government.

Effective April 24, 2011, Governor Rick Snyder signed Executive Order 2011-4 creating the Department of Licensing & Regulatory Affairs. The department was created by renaming the Department of Energy, Labor & Economic Growth and reorganizing functions among state departments to ensure efficient administration. Included in this executive order, the Wage & Hour Division joined the Michigan Occupational Safety & Health Administration (MIOSHA).

== Programs and Services ==
Enforcement Programs

MIOSHA has two enforcement divisions: the General Industry Safety and Health Division and the Construction Safety and Health Division.

The General Industry Safety and Health Division conducts safety and health inspections and investigations in all places of employment within the state of Michigan except those operations and activities covered by the Construction Safety and Health Division. This includes both private employers and all levels of public sector employers except facilities of the federal government. The division responds to complaints from employees or their representatives, investigates accidents including fatalities and catastrophes, and responds to referrals of unsafe conditions from other government agencies. In addition, the division conducts unannounced inspections at facilities throughout the state in accordance with current priority inspection guidelines. Citations, some with proposed penalties, may be issued to employers as a result of these inspections or investigations. Extensive tracking is done to ensure that the employers make the appropriate corrections to ensure the safety and health of their employees.

The Construction Safety and Health Division primarily conducts inspections to enforce occupational safety and health standards in the construction industry, and oversees licensing of asbestos abatement contractors and accreditation of asbestos workers. Enforcement of standards includes: inspection and hazard identification, issuance of citations for violations, and penalty assessment, if any. Types of inspections include: accidents (fatal and non-fatal), employee complaints, general scheduled, referrals, and follow-up. The division enforces safety and health standards in construction workplaces defined in the MIOSH Act as work activity designated in major groups 15, 16, and 17, of the Standard Industrial Classification Manual or code 23 of the North American Industry Classification System. All construction types are inspected including projects such as: road and bridge projects; sewer, water, gas, and electric utility lines; power plants; waste and water treatment plants; high rise construction; factory and other building additions; communication and power transmission towers; and single family homes.

Voluntary and Cooperative Programs

MIOSHA's Consultation Education and Training Division educates employers and employees in safety and health awareness.

Informal Conferences and Appeals

The MIOSHA Appeals Division provides employers, employees and the agency with services for resolution of contested MIOSHA cases. The MIOSH Act provides for a two-step appeal process for employers or employees to appeal any citations issued by the enforcement divisions. If the citations cannot be resolved through the informal conference process utilized by the enforcement divisions, the case is transmitted to the Appeals Division where pre-hearings or formal hearings are conducted.

Other MIOSHA Divisions and Services

The Management and Technical Services Division is responsible for a variety of services to MIOSHA staff and clients. Its staff prepare and administer most of the grants and contracts related to the federal programs that MIOSHA supports and monitor budget activity. The program areas include: The Laboratory and Equipment Services Section includes an industrial hygiene laboratory, which is accredited by the American Industrial Hygiene Association, for analysis of air and material samples for occupational exposure to air and physical contaminants. This section also includes an instrument calibration and maintenance program for providing field instrumentation to MIOSHA industrial hygienists and safety officers to assess exposure to chemical and physical hazards in the workplace.

The Management Information Systems Section is responsible for compilation of injury and illness data, provides information to MIOSHA clients about recordkeeping requirements, prepares statistical information and reports to programs about enforcement activities, monitors data related to MIOSHA strategic planning activities, and provides computer and software support to other MIOSHA programs.

The MIOSHA Standards Section) provides services for the promulgation of Michigan occupational safety and health standards and rules. It coordinates the activities of three commissions (the Construction Safety Standards Commission, the General Industry Safety Standards Commission, and the Occupational Health Standards Commission) and related advisory committees, and also conducts other activities, such as public hearings to receive comments on draft standards. The Freedom of Information Section coordinates and prepares most of the responses from MIOSHA for requests for information under the Michigan Freedom of Information Act. It also supports MIOSHA staff with information for depositions and subpoenas.

The Consultation Education and Training Grants Administrator manages the a grant program. The grants supplement MIOSHA activities by providing competitive grants to nonprofit organizations to provide training and education in emerging safety and health issues, to address particularly dangerous occupations, and to extend MIOSHA's impact through "train-the-trainer" projects and for difficult to reach target groups.

The Wage & Hour Division administers and enforces wage protection laws in Michigan (the Payment of Wages and Fringe Benefits Act, the Minimum Wage Act, the Youth Employment Standards Act, and the Prevailing Wages on State Projects Act).

== See also ==
- OSHA
- Occupational safety and health
- Occupational fatality
- Oregon OSHA
