= Ismael Ahmed =

American labor leader (1947–2026)

Member of the National Council on the Arts
- In office March 25, 2022 – January 31, 2026
- Appointed by: Joe Biden

Director of the Michigan Department of Human Services
- In office September 10, 2007 – January 3, 2011
- Governor: Jennifer Granholm; Rick Snyder
- Succeeded by: Duane Berger

Personal details
- Born: 1947 New York City, U.S.
- Died: January 31, 2026 (aged 79)
- Relations: Saladin Ahmed (son)
- Education: University of Michigan–Dearborn (BA)

Ismael N. Ahmed (1947 – January 31, 2026) was an American government official and labor leader who was the designate to be a member of the National Endowment of the Arts in the Biden administration. Ahmed previously served as the director of the Michigan Department of Human Services from September 2007 to January 3, 2011. He was appointed by Governor Jennifer Granholm in September 2007. As director of the state’s second-largest agency, Ahmed oversaw 10,000 employees and managed a $4 billion-plus budget serving 1.5 million medical assistance cases and 1.2 million cash and food assistance cases.

== Early life and education ==
Ismael Ahmed was born in Brooklyn in 1947, his father was from Egypt while his mother was from Lebanon. He moved to Detroit with his family when he was six years old. After high school, he traveled to Vietnam and Korea. He later became active in the United Auto Workers union to put himself through the University of Michigan–Dearborn, where he earned a Bachelor of Arts degree in secondary education and sociology in 1977.

== Career ==
After graduation, he began helping out his neighborhood and his community and in 1973, Ahmed co-founded the Arab Community Center for Economic and Social Services (ACCESS). He was appointed executive director in 1983 and was responsible for overall operations of the organization as well as the executive administration of the Arab American National Museum. The largest Arab-American human services organization in the United States, ACCESS has affiliates in 11 states and offers more than 90 programs with more than 900,000 client contacts annually.

For several years Ahmed hosted his own radio show, This Island Earth on WDET. He contributed a chapter on the Arab Worker’s Caucus in Detroit in Arabs in America: Myths and Realities, Abu-Laban and Zeadey eds. (AAUG Monograph Series #5: Medina University Press, 1975) and a chapter on Michigan Arab Americans in American Arabs and Political Participation, Strum, P. ed., (Woodrow Wilson International Center, 2006).

=== Biden administration ===
On June 23, 2021, Ahmed was nominated to serve as a member of the National Council on the Arts by President Joe Biden. He was confirmed by the entire Senate on December 18, 2021, by voice vote.

== Personal life and death ==
Ahmed's son, Saladin Ahmed, is a fantasy author.

Ismael Ahmed died on January 31, 2026, at the age of 79.

== Awards ==
Ismael Ahmed was honored with the Neal Shine Award for Exemplary Regional Leadership, which is given by the Detroit Free Press and Metropolitan Affairs Coalition. He also received the Distinguished Leadership Award from the University of Michigan–Dearborn and the Diversity Business Leader award from the Arab American Chamber of Commerce.
