= Michigan Liquor Control Commission =

Liquor governance agency in Michigan, USA

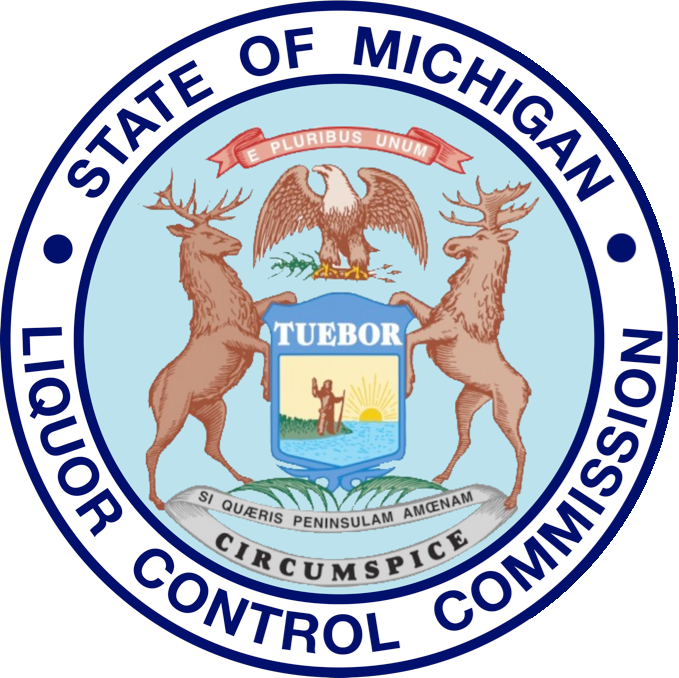

Commission overview
- Formed: December 15, 1933; 92 years ago
- Jurisdiction: Michigan transportation programs
- Commission executive: Chair, Kristin Beltzer
- Parent department: Michigan Department of Licensing and Regulatory Affairs
- Website: michigan.gov/lcc

Map

The Michigan Liquor Control Commission is a bureau of the Michigan Department of Licensing and Regulatory Affairs (LARA) within the Michigan state government, responsible for regulating the sale and distribution of liquor in the state.

== History ==
The Michigan Liquor Control Commission was established when Michigan voters approved a legislatively referred amendment to the Michigan Constitution by way of a statewide ballot measure in November 1932. The state's first liquor control act, which went into effect April 27, created a 17-member commission, one from each Congressional district. On December 15, 1933, the Michigan Legislature abolished the 17-member commission, replacing it with the current five-member commission.

By December 15, 1933, ten days after the end of Prohibition in the United States, the commission had opened liquor stores, and made liquor available for sale. By December 30, 1933, the commission had opened the first 7 state liquor stores—in Grand Rapids, Saginaw, Kalamazoo, Jackson, and three in Detroit. In 1934, an additional 96 liquor stores were opened.

== Activities ==
The Michigan Liquor Control Commission is responsible for licensing as well as establishment and enforcement of regulations related to liquor purchasing and merchandising in Michigan.

The mission of the commission is "to make alcoholic beverages available for consumption while protecting the consumer and the general public through regulation of those involved in the sale and distribution of these alcohol beverage products."

The commission's staff is composed of four divisions: enforcement, executive services, financial management, and licensing.

== Membership ==
The Michigan Liquor Control Commission is composed of five members appointed by the Governor of Michigan with the advice and consent of the Michigan Senate. No more than three members from the same political party may serve at the same time.

Two members are designated as hearing commissioners who preside over violation matters. The other three members are administrative commissioners responsible for matters related to licensing, purchasing, merchandising, and enforcement. These three members also serve as an appeal board for decisions rendered by the hearing commissioners.

Name	Type	Start	End
Kristin Beltzer^{†}	Administrative	April 2022	June 12, 2027
Dennis Olshove	Administrative	June 8, 2012	June 12, 2026
Hoon-Yung Hopgood	Administrative	June 13, 2023	June 12, 2027
Lee Gonzales	Hearing	September 2020	June 12, 2024
Edward Toma	Hearing	September 2020	June 12, 2024
^{†} Chair Information from LARA
