= MichiCard =

MichiCard was a voluntary program between Michigan libraries that intended to help develop a statewide library card for the residents of Michigan. The program was proposed and established by the Library of Michigan Board of Trustees' Task Force on Interdependency and Funding. This led the Michigan state legislature to approve funding in 1989 for the MichiCard program. The program was established as a universal program for statewide access to the large network of resources throughout the state in local libraries where residents from another community may not be able access these resources otherwise. The program is coordinated by the Library of Michigan. The program is a form of interlibrary loan which allows the patron to visit another library and check out material directly from another library in another community from which they live.

== Current program ==
MichiCard was discontinued in December 2013 due to decrease in amount of use and the greater functionality offered to libraries through the Michigan eLibrary's MeLCat statewide resource sharing program. In the early years of the Michicard program the Library of Michigan provided reimbursement funds for lost materials. Over time this funding ended and the support of the MeLCat program increased and also provided funding for lost materials.

== History ==
The program started in 1990. From 1990 to 1993 only public libraries were allowed to be part of the Michicard system. In 1994 the program was extended to allow academic libraries to become members of the programs. Then the program was opened to all libraries in the state of Michigan. As of 2009, there were 306 libraries and 205 branches that are current members which are part of the MichiCard system as of December 28, 2009.

== Problems ==
Some people have suggested that this program is a form of tax evasion as it allows communities not to build resources and burdens other communities by adding to the number of patrons the other libraries have to serve. This came to a head when a resident and attorney; Robert Toohey, of the City of Bloomfield Hills, Michigan sued the Bloomfield Township public library after the agreement. He wanted to allow residents of the city to use the township library after the two governments could not agree on a cost-sharing price . The person who was subject of the lawsuit was George Goldstone.

Toohey took the argument to the Michigan Supreme Court. He attempted to argue that the Michigan Constitution stated that libraries should grant "access" to all residents of the state. In the past this access has been to allow a person to use or access any material on in the library, without any rights to check out material.

The Michigan Supreme Court agreed to hear the case and heard arguments on April 10, 2007, and issued their ruling on July 26, 2007, in the case of George H. Goldstone v Bloomfield Township Public Library. The court ruled that "we granted leave to appeal to consider whether Const 1963, art 8, § 9, which states that public libraries 'shall be available to all residents of the state,' requires each individual public library facility in Michigan to offer nonresident book-borrowing privileges. The lower courts answered this question in the negative, and we agree, although for different reasons. Therefore, we affirm."

This ruling called the MichiCard program into question.
