= Michigan History (magazine) =

Magazine

- Categories: State history magazine
- Frequency: Bimonthly
- Publisher: Michigan Historical Commission & Historical Society of Michigan (1917–1965); Michigan Department of State (1965–2001); Michigan Department of History, Arts and Libraries (2001–2009); Historical Society of Michigan (2009–present)
- First issue: 1917; 109 years ago
- Country: United States
- Based in: Lansing, Michigan, United States
- Language: English
- Website: hsmichigan.org

Michigan History is a bimonthly state history magazine published by the Historical Society of Michigan in Lansing, Michigan. It was founded in 1917 as a “magazine of Michigan history for Michigan people by Michigan writers.” Since then, it has expanded into a full-color, 68-page international publication with a subscription base of over 20,000 and a total readership of nearly 100,000.

The magazine is published six times a year and offered either as an individual subscription or an enhancement to a membership with the Historical Society of Michigan.

== History ==
Michigan History magazine traces its roots to the Michigan Pioneer and Historical Collections, an annual, single-volume publication first published in 1874 by the Michigan Pioneer and Historical Society. These volumes consisted primarily of essays written by early pioneers that detailed local history and information about the area. With the publication of Volume 40 in 1916, the Pioneer Collections ceased production.

The following year, the Michigan Historical Commission, organized in 1913, and the Michigan Pioneer and Historical Society (now known as the Historical Society of Michigan) introduced the quarterly publication Michigan History. Early issues contained essays on subjects in Michigan history, biographical sketches, state historical news, reports from county and local historical societies, and the activities of schools and clubs doing work in Michigan history. The magazine also included the plans and progresses of the Michigan Pioneer and Historical Society as well as the Michigan Historical Commission, which had been organized as a state government department of history and archives.

For the next sixty years, Michigan History served as a traditionally academic quarterly publication, continuing to offer scholarly essays, book reviews, and news items. In 1965, the Society ceased its involvement with the publication of the magazine, and in 1972, the newly created Division of Michigan History, a division of the Michigan Department of State, took over the magazine's publication. This was done in conjunction with the commission, which served as an advisory board to the Division. Under the State Department, the journal converted to a popular magazine format and became a bimonthly publication beginning in 1978. The Division of Michigan History was renamed the Michigan Historical Center in 1995 and transferred from the Department of State to the newly created Department of History, Arts, and Libraries in October 2001.

In July 2009, Michigan Governor Jennifer Granholm issued Executive Order 2009–36, which terminated the Department of History, Arts, and Libraries and directed that Michigan History be transferred to a nonprofit society or foundation. On October 1, 2009, the magazine moved to the Historical Society of Michigan, a non-governmental nonprofit—the same organization that had been involved in producing the publication from its founding through 1965. The Society, led by executive director and CEO Larry J. Wagenaar, then established the subsidiary Michigan History Magazine L3C. As former editorial staff did not move with the magazine, Patricia Majher was announced as Editor in fall 2009. Along with Assistant Editor Maria Taylor, Majher oversaw a major redesign of the magazine in January 2016 and departed the staff in May 2016.

In May 2016, the Society reorganized its editorial staff into a new group that would oversee the organization's three major magazines: Michigan History, Chronicle, and Michigan History for Kids. On July 1, 2016, the subsidiary Michigan History Magazine L3C was dissolved by the Society's board of trustees and Michigan History was merged into the main operations of the Historical Society of Michigan.

The current editorial staff of Michigan History includes Amy Wagenaar as Director of Communications, Kristen Brennan as Editorial Manager, and Marie Grogitsky as Editorial Assistant. As of fall 2025 the Editor in Chief role is vacant. Graphic design is accomplished through a pool of graphic artists and internal staff. HSM Executive Director and CEO Larry J. Wagenaar continues to serve as the magazine's publisher.

== Content ==
Feature stories are typically authored by outside writers and historians who possess knowledge in Michigan's social, cultural, political, economic, architectural, and institutional history.

Other sections include news items involving Michigan societies, museums, and organizations; personal recollections entitled Remember the Time; milestones of historical Michigan institutions; book summaries; happenings at the Historical Society of Michigan; travel destinations as featured in HSM's Historic Michigan Travel Guide; and featured photography.

== Editor in Chief ==
- George N. Fuller (1917–1946)
- Lewis Beeson (1946-1965)
- George S. May (1966)
- Donald Chaput (1966-1971)
- Martha Bigelow (1972-1973)
- John Hoffman (1973-1975)
- Timothy Walters (1975-1979)
- Sandra S. Clark (1980-1988)
- Roger L. Rosentreter (1988-2009)
- Patricia Majher (2009-2016)
- Nancy Feldbush (2016–2021)
- Emily Allison (2021–2023)
- Sarah Hamilton (2023-2025)

== Publishers ==
- Larry J. Wagenaar (2009–present)

== See also ==
- Michigan Historical Review
