= Randy Riley =

American librarian (1962–2026)

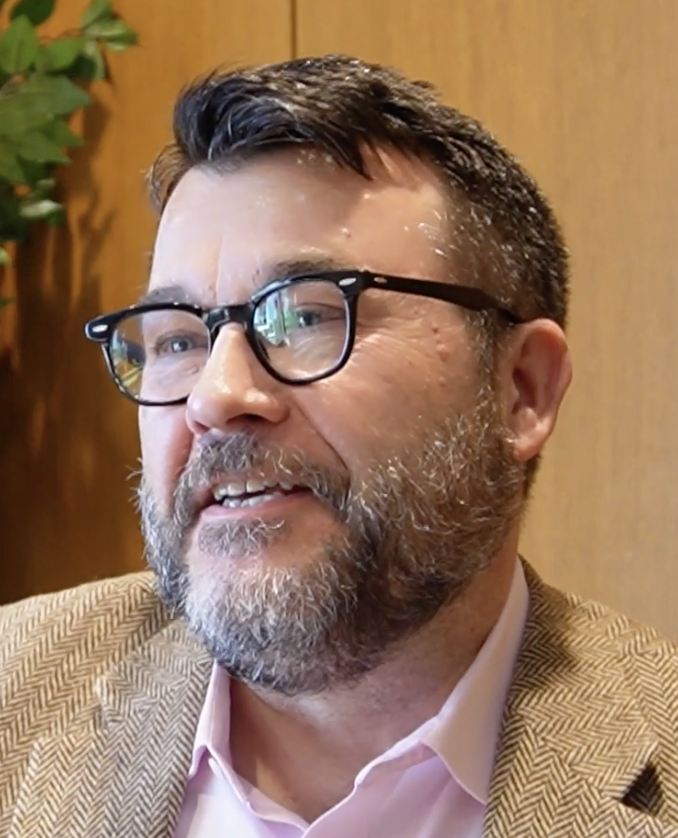
- Riley in 2024
- Born: Randy Joseph Riley; September 21, 1962; Ionia, Michigan, U.S.
- Died: January 3, 2026 (aged 63); East Lansing, Michigan, U.S.
- Occupation: State librarian

Randy Joseph Riley (September 21, 1962 – January 3, 2026) was an American librarian who served as the State Librarian of Michigan from 2014 to 2025.

== Background ==
Riley was born in Ionia, Michigan, on September 21, 1962, to Leonard and Camilla Riley. He married Lori Cunningham on August 27, 1988 and the couple had two children.

He received a bachelor's degree in education from Central Michigan University and a master’s degree of Information and Library Studies in the Archives and Records Management Program at the University of Michigan in 1989.

Riley died in East Lansing, Michigan, on January 3, 2026, at the age of 63. After his death, a memorial service was held at the Library of Michigan with over 500 attendees.

== Career ==
Riley began his career as a teacher, teaching history and social studies. He began working for the Library of Michigan after getting his library degree in 1989. He had many roles within the Library of Michigan including being head of special collections, and Michigan eLibrary (MeL) coordinator. He was the editor of the Michigan Genealogist newsletter and 2010 received the Filby Award, a recognition given to the leading family history librarian in the U.S. He played a founding role in the creation of the Michigan Service Hub for the Digital Public Library of America and the Michigan Digital Preservation Network. He worked with Archives of Michigan to create SeekingMichigan, an online resource for genealogical research containing over one million freely available death records.

He served as a state librarian after being appointed in 2014. He coordinated the Michigan Notable Books program as well as the Michigan Center for the Book. He worked on projects such as the Post-Pandemic Public Library Project, an initiative to help library directors and their communities reconnect after COVID.

Riley had a career belief in outreach saying "We have plenty of librarians that love books. We now need more librarians that love people." In 2023 he was in the advisory board for the University of Michigan School of Information's Civic Librarian Project, a course encouraging librarians to work with local governments and residents on solutions to civic problems.
