= Michigan Department of Civil Rights =

Department of Civil Rights
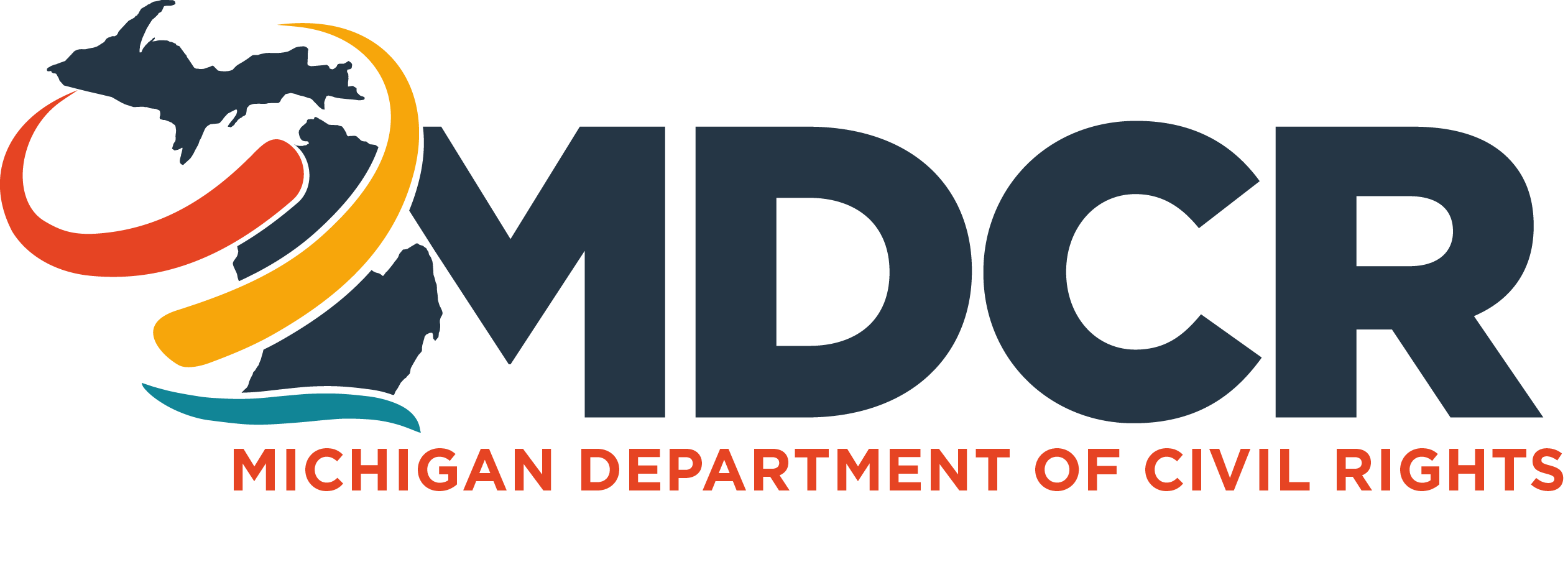
- Michigan Department of Civil Rights logo

Department overview
- Formed: 1965
- Headquarters: Lansing, Michigan
- Department executives: Portia L. Roberson (Chair); Zenna Faraj Elhasan (Vice-Chair); Gloria E. Lara (Secretary); Anupama Kosaraju; Richard Corriveau; David Worthams; Luke R. Londo , Commissioners; John E. Johnson, Jr, Executive Director
- Child agencies: Division on Deaf, Blind and Hard of Hearing
- Website: michigan.gov/mdcr

Michigan Department of Civil Rights is a department of the Michigan State Government created in 1965 to support the work of the Michigan Civil Rights Commission of Michigan's Constitution of 1963. The Commission directs the work of the department and has eight members. The executive director is John E. Johnson, Jr.

The Department of Civil Rights investigates and resolves discrimination complaints and works to prevent discrimination through educational programs that promote voluntary compliance with civil rights laws.

== History ==
In 1963, Michigan approved a new constitution which included the creation of the Michigan Civil Rights Commission. In 1965, a principal department was formed to support the work of the commission.

In 1991, the Michigan Women's Commission was transferred to the department from the Michigan Department of Management and Budget by the Governor's Executive Order.

By 1998, the department also housed the Indian Affairs Commission, and the Commission on Spanish Speaking Affairs.

In April 2011, Governor Rick Snyder transferred from the Department of Energy, Labor and Economic Growth to the Department the Commission on Disability Concerns, the Division on Deaf and Hard of Hearing, the Asian Pacific American Affairs Commission and Hispanic/Latino Commission. The Hispanic/Latino Commission (formerly known as the Commission on Spanish Speaking Affairs) and the Asian Pacific American Affairs Commission were transferred to the Department of Licensing and Regulatory Affairs (LARA) by Executive Order in 2016.

In February 2013, the department filed complaints with the U.S. Department of Education against 35 Michigan high districts that use "American Indian mascots, names, nicknames, slogans, chants and/or imagery". The Education Department dismissed the case using the previously established 'hostile environment' standard.

Over the years, MDCR has produced a number of issue papers and policy documents. Beginning in 2006 through 2017, a series of reports on migrant and seasonal farmworkers were completed. In January 2013, the department issued the Report on LGBT Inclusion Under Michigan Law for the commission to review.

In 2014, the department blocked the Twitter account then being used by Barack Obama from following its own Twitter account.

The same year, an "uproar" occurred after the civil rights commission, which oversees the department, unanimously voted to pay a $24,740 bonus to department executive director Agustin Arbulu in a secret meeting that violated Michigan's open meetings law. The commission ultimately agreed to "redo the bonus vote" in open session. Arbulu rejected the bonus.

In 2018 Ira Combs, whom Michigan Radio characterized as "one of the most prominent and active anti-LGBT activists" in Michigan was appointed to the civil rights commission. The appointment was met with bipartisan concern.

In November 2020, the Michigan Women's Commission was transferred to the Michigan Department of Labor and Economic Opportunity.

== See also ==
- List of civil rights agencies in the United States
