= W.J. Maxey Boys Training School =

- Interactive map of W.J. Maxey Boys Training School
- Location: Whitmore Lake, Michigan; 42.44207°N 83.76665°W
- Status: Closed
- Security class: Males ages 12-21
- Capacity: 60
- Closed: October 1, 2015
- Managed by: Michigan Department of Health and Human Services

W.J. Maxey Boys Training School was a juvenile corrections facility that served delinquent male youths ages 12–21 years old. The facility has sixty beds and provided services to Michigan youth who require intensive or specialized rehabilitation treatment and a high level of security and structure. Maxey closed on October 1, 2015, due to budget cuts in Michigan.

== Services ==
Individual and group services were supervised by clinical professionals, including psychiatrists, psychologists, and certified social workers. Programming areas included sex offender treatment, substance abuse treatment, criminal behavior treatment, and behavioral health treatment.

Additional services provided by the facility included mental and physical health care, community reintegration, restorative justice, and spiritual development.

=== Educational services ===
Maxey School provided a full-day, year-round educational program accredited by the North Central Association of Colleges and Schools. All teachers were state-certified educators and special education services are available. Students were provided with a curriculum targeted toward completion of their high school degree or GED. Students were also provided training in life skills and vocational areas such as construction trades, cosmetology, and graphic design.

== History ==
The vision and planning that led to the facility came from Willard J. Maxey, Sr., a leading Michigan corrections official who served as director of the Michigan Department of Social Services in the 1950s. As a high-security correctional institution within the Michigan criminal justice establishment, its goal was to rehabilitate court-designated male juvenile delinquents through vocational training in trades like carpentry and mechanics. The facility was built with the Henry de Koning Construction Co. of Ann Arbor as general contractor, and was opened in 1960 with the name Vocational Training School. On May 25, 1963 it was renamed the W. J. Maxey Boys’ Training School in honor of Maxey, who had died on March 2 of that year (Ann Arbor News, February 5, 1960 p. 6 and May 25, 1963 p. 13).

Following visits by consultants in the fields of juvenile justice management, medical and mental health care, fire safety protection, and education in March and April 2003, the US Department of Justice concluded on April 19, 2004, that "certain conditions at Maxey violate the constitutional and/or statutory rights of juveniles confined at the facility." Including and not limited to physical abuse, sexual abuse and mental and emotional abuses. As the maxey model promotes violence among the peer groups. The state agreed to comply with recommendations made by the Department of Justice.

In April 2012, some Michigan state legislators wanted to close all state juvenile justice facilities in the state, including Maxey. The closings were not part of the Governor's recommended budget, but were added during the House Appropriations Committee review.

On October 1, 2015, Maxey was closed at the start of the State's 2016 fiscal year. Maxey staff worked with judges to reassign the youth other facilities. Of the 48 youth at Maxey when the facility closed, 18 went to Michigan's other two juvenile correction facilities, 16 went to private agencies, eight went home to relatives, three entered supervised independent living programs, two went to Job Corps, and one was transferred to a county-run program. The first transfer happened in June 2015 and the final transfer occurred on September 30. The Michigan Department of Health and Human Services reported to a Michigan legislative panel on November 3 that one former inmate was jailed on a weapons charge and another failed to return to their new program after a weekend break. Both had been transferred to Job Corps. The department indicated it planned to monitor former inmates of the facility for two years.

== See also ==
- List of Michigan state prisons
