= Michigan Department of Insurance and Financial Services =

Government agency of the state of Michigan

Department overview
- Formed: March 19, 2013
- Preceding Department: Office of Financial and Insurance Regulation
- Type: Department
- Jurisdiction: Michigan
- Headquarters: Lansing, Michigan
- Department executive: Anita G. Fox, Director
- Child agencies: Office of Banking; Office of Consumer Finance; Office of Consumer Services; Office of Credit Unions; Office of Financial and Administrative Services; Office of General Counsel; Office of Insurance Evaluation; Office of Insurance Licensing and Market Conduct; Office of Insurance Rates and Forms; Office of Policy, Research and Communication
- Key documents: Executive Order 2013-1; Executive Order 2000-2
- Website: michigan.gov/difs

The Michigan Department of Insurance and Financial Services (DIFS), formerly the Office of Financial and Insurance Regulation, is a principal department in the Michigan executive branch with responsibility for insurance and financial institutions.

== History ==
=== Office ===
Governor John Engler created the Office of Financial and Insurance Regulation as a Type I agency within the Michigan Department of Consumer and Industry Services to be headed up by a commissioner appointed to a four-year term. The Corporations, Securities and Land Development Bureau's security functions and all functions of the Insurance Bureau and Financial Institutions Bureau were transferred to the office.

=== Department ===
On January 17, 2013, Governor Rick Snyder ordered that the Office of Financial and Insurance Regulation (OFIR) be transfer out of the Michigan Department of Licensing and Regulatory Affairs to form a new principal department, the Michigan Department of Insurance and Financial Services, effective March 19, 2013. The Commissioner of the OFIR, Kevin Clinton, was selected to be the first department director. The Governor formed the department in hopes of better regulations thus drawing more insurance and banking companies to the state thus leading to more jobs.

In May 2013, the DIFS ordered two unlicensed pay day loan operators to stop activities in Michigan. In June, an Ingham County Circuit Judge order the liquidation of American Fellowship Mutual Insurance Co. from a request from DIFS with the Department Director selected as liquidator. On November 1, OFIR chief deputy commissioner and department's chief deputy director Annette E. Flood was appointed to head the department.

The department placed Clarkston Brandon Community Credit Union into Conservatorship with the National Credit Union Administration as conservator in January 2015 after $20 million was stolen by CFO Michael LaJoice since 2013. On May 18, 2015, Pat McPharlin took over the position of department director from Flood. Governor Snyder in September 2018 ordered the formation an Anti-Fraud Unit criminal justice agency to investigate auto and health insurance and finance related crimes.

Anita Fox was appointed by Gov. Gretchen Whitmer on Dec. 27, 2018. Director Fox officially began her tenure as director of the Michigan Department of Insurance and Financial Services (DIFS) on Jan. 14.
