= Law of Michigan =

The law of the US state of Michigan consists of several levels, including constitutional, statutory, regulatory and case law. The Michigan Compiled Laws form the general statutory law.

== Sources ==
The Constitution of Michigan is the foremost source of state law. Legislation is enacted by the Michigan Legislature, published in the Acts of the Legislature, and codified in the Michigan Compiled Laws. State agency regulations (sometimes called administrative law) are published in the Michigan Register and codified in the Michigan Administrative Code. Michigan's legal system is based on common law, which is interpreted by case law through the decisions of the Supreme Court and Court of Appeals, which are published in the Michigan Reports and Michigan Appeals Reports, respectively.

=== Constitution ===
The foremost source of state law is the Constitution of Michigan. The Michigan Constitution in turn is subordinate to the Constitution of the United States, which is the supreme law of the land.

=== Legislation ===
Pursuant to the state constitution, the Michigan Legislature has enacted legislation. These legislative acts are published in the official Public and Local Acts of the Legislature of the State of Michigan and are called "session laws". They in turn have been codified in the Michigan Compiled Laws. Both are published by the Michigan Legislative Service Bureau (LSB). Pursuant to Article IV, Section 36, of the Michigan Constitution, the compilations and codifications are not binding.

=== Regulations ===
Pursuant to certain statutes, state agencies have promulgated regulations, also known as administrative law. The regulations are published in the Michigan Register (MR) and codified in the Michigan Administrative Code (MAC or AC). The Michigan Administrative Code was last printed in 1979. The Annual Administrative Code Supplement (AACS) is the annual supplement to the Michigan Administrative Code containing the rules published in the Michigan Register for that year. All three works are published by the Michigan Office of Regulatory Reinvention within the Michigan Department of Licensing and Regulatory Affairs. From 1980 to 1997, the AACS was published by the LSB.

=== Case law ===
The legal system of Michigan is based on the common law. Like all U.S. states except Louisiana, Michigan has a reception statute providing for the "reception" of English law. All statutes, regulations, and ordinances are subject to judicial review. Pursuant to common law tradition, the courts of Michigan have developed a large body of case law through the decisions of the Michigan Supreme Court and Michigan Court of Appeals.

The decisions of the Supreme Court and Court of Appeals are published in the Michigan Reports and Michigan Appeals Reports, respectively. Both are also reported in the unofficial Michigan Reporter (a Michigan-specific version of the North Western Reporter).

== Compiled Laws ==
The Michigan Compiled Laws (MCL) are the official codification of statutes for the state of Michigan. An unannotated edition of the MCL is published by the state of Michigan in print and online.

Unofficial, annotated versions are published by both West and LexisNexis. The West publication is Michigan Compiled Laws Annotated (MCLA); the LexisNexis version is the Michigan Compiled Laws Service (MCLS).

Until the year 2000, an alternate codification known as the Michigan Statutes Annotated (MSA), which differed from the MCL in both its organization and numbering system, was also in use. Until the discontinuation of the MSA by LexisNexis, Michigan Court Rules required citation to both the MCL and MSA in all court filings.

== See also ==
=== Topics ===
- Capital punishment in Michigan
- Felony murder rule (Michigan)
- Gun laws in Michigan
- LGBT rights in Michigan

=== Other ===
- Politics of Michigan
- List of law enforcement agencies in Michigan
- Crime in Michigan
- Law of the United States
- United States Code
