= Michigan Railroad Commission =

Former government agency

Agency overview
- Formed: 1873
- Dissolved: 1919
- Superseding agency: Michigan Public Utilities Commission

The Michigan Railroad Commission was an agency in the state of Michigan which regulated the operations of railroads within the state. It was established by the Michigan Legislature in 1873; in 1919 it was abolished and its functions transferred to a new body, the Michigan Public Utilities Commission.

== History ==
The office was established in 1873 as part of a general reform of the state's railroad laws. One requirement was that every common carrier railroad submit an annual report to the commission, which were then collected and published. These reports were published every year from 1873 until the abolition of the commission in 1919, and remain an important resource for historians. From 1905 onward the commissioner had some measure of control over the state police; this need was apparently prompted by a sharp increase in accidents involving the new electric interurbans.

In 1907 a revision of the law expanded the office; the single commissioner was replaced a group of three. This was prompted by the urging of then-Commissioner Chase Osborn, who believed the system of a single commissioner was antiquated that a "modern type" of commission with greater powers of intervention was necessary. To provide greater continuity in policy, the three commissioners would serve six-year terms at staggered intervals. The commission also received the power to enforce the state's rate regulations and to arbitrate disputes between companies concerning the application of those rates. The commission remained so structured until its replacement in 1919 by the Michigan Public Utilities Commission, which did not retain the title, nor did any of the sitting railroad commissioners serve on the new body.

== Duties ==
The general railroad law of 1873 specified a number of rights and responsibilities for the "Commissioner of Railroads", including but not limited to:

- Reporting: Every railroad company was required by law to furnish a report of its operations to the commissioner including disposition of capital stock, assets and liabilities, company officers, debt, the value and disposition of its physical plant (including roadbed, bridges, stations, rolling stock and track), the number of miles operated by its trains during the preceding year, earnings and expenses broken down by month and source, expenditures on improvements and investments, rates charged for passenger and freight traffic, accidents on its lines and operating agreements with other companies. In turn, the commissioner was required to publish these reports. (Note: The full list is enumerated in the law itself.)
- Investigation: the commissioner was empowered by the act to inquire into the affairs of railroad companies independent of the annual reports, and permitted to use subpoenas to compel testimony from company officials.
- Inspection: the commissioner was empowered to inspect a company's physical plant, and to restrict the operation of passenger trains over sections of a line deemed unsafe. In 1886 and again in 1893, the commission closed the St. Joseph Valley Railway to passenger traffic because of the deterioration of the roadbed.

== Railroad commissioners ==
From 1873 until 1907 a single commissioner was appointed by the Governor of Michigan. From 1907 until 1919 the governor appointed a body of three.

- Stephen S. Cobb (1873–1877)
- William B. Williams (1877–1883)
- William P. Innes (1883–1885)
- William McPherson (1885–1887)
- John T. Rich (1887–1891)
- Charles R. Whitman (1891–1893)
- Simeon R. Billings (1893–1897)
- Sybrant Wesselius (1897–1899)
- Chase S. Osborn (1899–1903)
- Theron W. Atwood (1903–1907)
- Addison A. Keiser (1907)
- Cassius L. Glasgow (1907–1919)
- George W. Dickinson (1907–1911)
- James Scully (1907–1913)
- Lawton T. Hemans (1911–1916)
- Charles S. Cunningham (1913–1919)
- David H. Crowley (1916–1917)
- Addison A. Keiser (1917–1919)
