= Michigan State Housing Development Authority =

Agency overview
- Formed: 1966
- Jurisdiction: The State of Michigan
- Headquarters: 735 E. Michigan Avenue Lansing, Michigan
- Agency executive: Amy Hovey, Executive Director
- Parent agency: Michigan Department of Labor and Economic Opportunity
- Website: michigan.gov/mshda

The Michigan State Housing Development Authority (MSHDA) is a quasi-public agency of the U.S. state of Michigan under the umbrella of the Michigan Department of Labor and Economic Opportunity.

== History ==
MSHDA was created as a result of the State Housing Development Authority Act of 1966 (Act 346 of 1966). The purpose of this act was to establish funds in housing development, land acquisition and development, rehabilitation, conversion condominium fund, and to provide for the expenditure of certain funds. In addition, it was created to authorize the making and purchasing of loans, differed payment loans, and grants to qualified developers, sponsors, individuals, mortgage lenders, and municipalities. The State Housing Development Authority Act of 1966 also established and continues to provide acceleration and foreclosure procedures, provide tax exemption, authorize payments instead of taxes by nonprofit housing corporations, consumer housing cooperatives, limited dividend housing corporations, mobile home park corporations, and mobile home park associations, and prescribe criminal penalties for violations of the act.

== See also ==
- Pure Michigan
