= Michigan Department of Licensing and Regulatory Affairs =

Government agency

Department of Licensing and Regulatory Affairs

Department overview
- Preceding agencies: Department of Commerce; Department of Labor
- Type: Principal Department
- Jurisdiction: Michigan
- Headquarters: Lansing, Michigan
- Department executive: Marlon I. Brown, Director
- Child agencies: Bureau of Construction Codes (BCC); Bureau of Community and Health Systems (BCHS); Bureau of Professional Licensing (BPL); Bureau of Fire Services (BFS); Child Care Licensing Bureau (CCLB); Corporations, Securities and Commercial Licensing (CSCL); [Michigan Office of Administrative Hearings and Rules] (MOAHR); Marijuana Regulatory Agency (MRA); Michigan Indigent Defense System (MIDC); Michigan Liquor Control Commission (MLCC); Michigan Public Service Commission (MPSC); Michigan Unarmed Combat Commission (MUCC)
- Key document: Executive Order No. 2011-4
- Website: michigan.gov/lara

The Michigan Department of Licensing and Regulatory Affairs (LARA), originally the Department of Commerce among other names, is a principal department in the Michigan executive branch that oversees employment, professional licensing, construction, and commerce.

== History ==
The department, as the Department of Commerce, was formed in 1965 by Section 225 of the Executive Organization Act of 1965, 1965 PA 380, MCL 16.325. The Michigan Department of Licensing and Regulation was abolished with most responsibilities transferred to the newly formed Department. It was renamed the Department of Consumer and Industry Services under an executive order issued in 1996 by Governor John Engler, merging most of the Department of Labor within the Department of Commerce. Engler also transferred some responsibilities of the former Commerce Department to the Michigan Jobs Commission.

Governor Engler created the Office of Financial and Insurance Regulation as a Type I agency within the department in 2000. The Corporations, Securities and Land Development Bureau's security functions and all functions of the Insurance Bureau and Financial Institutions Bureau were transferred to the office.

In 2003, Governor Granholm issued an executive order renaming the department to the "Department of Labor and Economic Growth." A few boards were transferred from the Family Independence Agency, and some functions of the Fire Marshal Division of the Department of State Police were transferred to its Bureau of Construction Codes and Fire Safety. With that same Executive order, the Brownfield Redevelopment Single Business Tax Credits and a merged Metropolitan Extension Telecommunications Rights-of-Way Oversight Authority and Michigan Broadband Development Authority were moved from the Department of Treasury to the department. From the Department of Management and Budget, Michigan Next Energy Authority, Michigan Strategic Fund were transferred. The Department of Career Development was also merged with the department under this executive order.

In 2008, Governor Granholm moved various energy-related programs from the Michigan Department of Agriculture and elsewhere to the department and renamed the department to "Michigan Department of Energy, Labor & Economic Growth" (DELEG). The various programs transferred were the "No Worker Left Behind" green jobs training initiatives, Michigan's new energy efficiency building code, the Public Service Commission and energy efficiency programs, the Office of Sustainability, the Renewable Fuels Commission, and the State Energy Office.

In April 2011, Governor Snyder renamed the department to the "Department of Licensing and Regulatory Affairs" (LARA), transferring the Michigan Next Energy Authority, Michigan State Housing Development Authority, Bureau of Workforce Transformation, the Council for Labor and Economic Growth, and Land Bank Fast Track Authority to the Michigan Strategic Fund. Agencies transferred to the LARA from the Michigan Department of Community Health were the Bureau of Health Professions, Bureau of Health Systems, and the Controlled Substances Advisory Commission. Transferred from the LARA to the Michigan Department of Civil Rights were the Disability Concerns Commission, Division on Deaf and Hard of Hearing, Pacific American Affairs Commission, and Hispanic/Latino Commission. The independent Michigan Administrative Hearing System was also created within the department under the reorganization plan.

On March 18, 2015, Snyder signed an executive order to form the Michigan Agency for Energy within LARA in 60 days. On January 17, 2013, Governor Snyder ordered that the Office of Financial and Insurance Regulation be transferred out of the department to form a new Michigan Department of Insurance and Financial Services effective March 19, 2013. On December 6, 2018, the department formed the Bureau of Marijuana Regulation concurrent with the legalization of recreational marijuana to handle both types of possession. On February 4, 2019, Governor Gretchen Whitmer ordered that the Michigan Agency for Energy be transferred out of the department and into the Department of Environment, Great Lakes, and Energy as the Office of Climate and Energy.

In 2021 the Child Care Licensing Bureau was created within the Department of Licensing and Regulatory Affairs. The Child Care Licensing Bureau performs state licensing regulatory duties as required by state laws and federal requirements. The bureau program is designed to protect the health, safety and welfare of children receiving care and services in licensed child care settings.

== Former names ==
- Department of Commerce (1965–1996)
- Department of Consumer and Industry Services (1996–2003)
- Department of Labor and Economic Growth (2003–2008)
- Department of Energy, Labor & Economic Growth (2008 – April 2011)

== See also ==
- List of company registers
