= Michigan Department of History, Arts and Libraries =

Agency overview
- Formed: October 2001
- Preceding agencies: Library of Michigan; Mackinac State Historic Parks; Michigan Council for Arts and Cultural Affairs; Michigan Film Office; Michigan Historical Center
- Dissolved: 2009
- Agency executives: William A. Anderson, Director; Mark Hoffman, Deputy Director
- Child agencies: Library of Michigan; Michigan Historical Center Michigan Council for Arts and Cultural Affairs Michigan Film Office Michigan History Center
- Website: michigan.gov/hal

The Michigan Department of History, Arts and Libraries (MHAL) was a state government agency of the U.S. state of Michigan. It was created in 2001 and was eliminated in 2009.

== History and responsibilities ==
The Michigan Department of History, Arts and Libraries was a portmanteau agency created by executive reorganization in October 2001 during the administration of Governor John Engler. The specific functions of the department dated back to the publication startup of the Michigan Pioneer and Historical Collections in 1874, followed by the creation of the Mackinac Island State Park Commission in 1895. The agency included the Library of Michigan, the Mackinac State Historic Parks, the Michigan Council for Arts and Cultural Affairs, and the Michigan Historical Center.

The department operated several of Michigan's resources for learning and tourism, including Fort Mackinac, Fort Michilimackinac, the Library of Michigan, Michigan History Center, and the Thunder Bay National Marine Sanctuary. It also published Michigan History magazine.

The department was eliminated by executive reorganization in July 2009 by the administration of governor Jennifer Granholm.
