= Michigan Department of Labor and Economic Opportunity =

Government organization

Principal department overview
- Formed: March 16, 2015
- Jurisdiction: Michigan
- Principal department executive: Susan Corbin, Director
- Child agencies: Michigan Economic Development Corporation; Michigan Occupational Safety and Health Administration
- Key document: Executive Order 2019-13
- Website: michigan.gov/leo

The Michigan Department of Labor and Economic Opportunity (LEO) is a principal department of the State of Michigan. The department oversees the state's programs for unemployment insurance, business growth, affordable housing, labor relations, and tourism, among others.

== History ==
=== Background ===
Before the creation of Michigan's LEO, two previous principal departments focused on job training: the Department of Labor and the Michigan Department of Career Development.

=== Department of Talent and Economic Development ===
On December 18, 2014, Governor Rick Snyder used his constitutional authority to reorganize the executive branch of government to create the Michigan Department of Talent and Economic Development (TED). The Michigan Economic Development Corporation (MEDC) and Michigan Strategic Fund were scheduled to be transferred into the new department. A new agency, the Talent Investment Agency (TIA), was also set to be started concurrently with the department. The Michigan Strategic Fund would take over the State Land Bank Fast Track Authority from the Michigan State Housing Development Authority.

The Michigan Department of Talent and Economic Development came into existence on March 16, 2015 with the department's first director being Steve Arwood, concurrently CEO of the MEDC. TIA's first head was Stephanie Comai. Arwood indicated that effectively, himself as director, the TIA head and MSHDA Director Wayne Workman would the management committee for the department.

=== Labor and Economic Opportunity ===
On June 6, 2019, Governor Gretchen Whitmer signed a re-organizational executive order renaming the department to Department of Labor and Economic Opportunity effective August 11. As a part of the department's re-organization, two commissions were formed in the department, the Workers’ Disability Compensation Appeals Commission and the Unemployment Insurance Appeals Commission. The Michigan Strategic Fund's board was restructured. The formerly defunct State Lake Bank Fast Track Authority was re-formed, while the Michigan Compensation Appellate Commission was eliminated. A number of other agencies were transferred into the department. From the Department of Licensing and Regulatory Affairs were transferred the

Michigan Office of New Americans as the Office for Global Michigan and Wage and Hour Division. From the Department of Health and Human Services came Michigan Rehabilitation Services. Also transferred in were: Michigan State Housing Development Authority, State Historic Preservation Office, State Historic Preservation Review Board, Unemployment Insurance Agency, Michigan Council for Rehabilitation Services, Michigan Community Service Commission, Asian Pacific American Affairs Commission, Board of health Safety and Compliance and Appeals, Bureau of Services for Blind Person, Commission for Blind Person, Commission on Middle Eastern American Affairs, Employment Relations Commission, Hispanic/Latino Commission of Michigan, Michigan Occupational Safety and Health Administration, Worker's Compensation Agency and Worker's Compensation Board of Magistrates. The MiSTEM Advisory Council was supplanted by the Michigan Science, Technology, Engineering and Mathematics Education Advisory Council formed within the department. Detroit's executive director of workforce development Jeff Donofrio was appointed by Whitmer as the department director.

== Talent Investment Agency ==
Michigan Talent Investment Agency
Agency overview
- Formed: March 16, 2015
- Jurisdiction: Michigan
- Agency executive: Steve Arwood, Director
- Parent agency: Michigan Department of Talent and Economic Development
- Key document: Michigan Executive Order 2014-12

The Talent Investment Agency (TIA) started concurrently with the department, taking over activities previously carried out by Michigan State Housing and Development Authority, the Workforce Development Agency, the Governor's Talent Investment Board and the Unemployment Insurance Agency. TIA's first director was Stephanie Comai when the agency came into existence on March 16, 2015 with in the Department of Talent and Economic Development.

=== Unemployment Insurance Agency ===
The Unemployment Insurance Agency (UIA) is the agency through which Michigan provides unemployment compensation.
