= Michigan Department of Health and Human Services =

Department of the state of Michigan

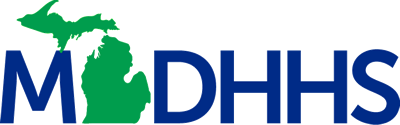
- Department's logo

Department overview
- Formed: April 2015
- Preceding agencies: Department of Community Health; Department of Public Health; Department of Mental Health; Medical Services Administration; Department of Human Services; Family Independence Agency; Department of Social Services
- Type: State agency
- Employees: 14,000
- Department executive: Elizabeth Hertel, Director
- Website: michigan.gov/mdhhs

The Michigan Department of Health and Human Services (MDHHS) is a principal department of state of Michigan, headquartered in Lansing, that provides public assistance, child and family welfare services, and oversees health policy and management.

Additionally, the MDHHS oversees Michigan's child and adult protective services, foster care, adoptions, juvenile justice, domestic violence, and child support programs. The MDHHS also licenses adult foster care, child day care and child welfare facilities.

== History ==
In April 2015, the Department of Human Services (DHS) was merged with the Department of Community Health (DCH) to create the Department of Health and Human Services.

=== Department of Human Services ===
Initially called the Department of Social Services, DHS was created in 1965 and went through several rounds of name changes until 2004, when it was renamed to the Department of Human Services.

In August 2007, Governor Jennifer Granholm named Ismael Ahmed to replace Marianne Udow as department director effective September 10, 2007.

100 employees were laid off due to budget cuts in January 2015.

In January 2021, Governor Whitmer named Elizabeth Hertel as department director. Hertel was serving as the Chief Deputy of Administration at MDHHS from 2019 until she was appointed as Director.

=== Department of Community Health ===
The Department of Community Health was created in 1996 through an executive order merging Department of Public Health (as Community Public Health Agency), Department of Mental Health, Medical Services Administration from the Department of Social Services, responsibility for Liquor Control Commission, Licensing, Monitoring and Accreditation and Division of Occupational Health from Department of Commerce, Food Service Sanitation from the Department of Agriculture and many functions of Department of Social Services.

=== Merger ===
The merger of the Department of Human Services (DHS) and the Department of Community Health was announced by Governor Rick Snyder during his 2015 State of the State address.

== Programs ==
The department has several agencies and programs operating under its management.

- Women, Infants & Children (WIC)

The Women, Infants & Children program is a supplemental nutrition program offered to children through age five years, those pregnant, breastfeeding, and post-partum. The program offers a monthly food package, breastfeeding information, access to a registered dietician, among other resources to provide healthy nutrition.

- Cash Assistance
- Children's Special Health Services
- Emergency Relief for Home, Utilities, and Burial
- Food Assistance Program The Food Assistance Program (FAP) is the state-administered public assistance program which provides the federally funded Supplemental Nutrition Assistance Program (SNAP) benefits to eligible Michigan residents. Eligibility for FAP is determined by expenses, asset limits, income, and residency requirements. Clients are given a Michigan Bridge Card which is loaded on a monthly basis. FAP recipients may use their benefits at participating retailers throughout the state, as well as select retailers online. Additionally, the free nutrition education and physical activity promotion Supplemental Nutrition Assistance Program Education (SNAP-Ed) is offered to those who receive or are eligible for SNAP, therefore FAP, benefits.
- Health Care Coverage
- Medicaid
- Migrant Services
- Housing and Homeless Services
- Low-Income Households Water Assistance Program
- Refugee Assistance
- Adult & Children's Services
  - Hope For A Home program, which includes both Foster Care and Adoption services to help children find a much needed home.
  - Abuse & Neglect service allows anyone who is dealing with abuse or neglect, or suspects someone is dealing with abuse or neglect, to report it. All it takes is a call to the number 855-444-3911.

=== Epidemiology ===
The Bureau of Epidemiology and Population Health is under the purview of the MDHHS. Past Chief Epidemiologists of Michigan include Professor Matthew Boulton of the University of Michigan.

=== Bureau of Juvenile Justice ===
The Bureau of Juvenile Justice is responsible for the operation of juvenile correctional facilities.

Facilities include:

- Bay Pines Center
- Shawono Center (Boys adjudicated for sex offenses)

Former facilities:

- W.J. Maxey Boys Training School (Closed October 1, 2015)

== Districts ==
The Michigan Department of Health and Human Services is divided into 43 districts to service the 84 counties.

- Allegan County Health Department: Allegan
- Barry-Eaton District Health Department: Barry and Eaton
- Bay County Health Department: Bay
- Benzie-Leelanau District Health Department: Benzie and Leelanau
- Berrien County Health Department: Berrien
- Branch-Hillsdale-St. Joseph Community Health Agency: Branch, Hillsdale and St. Joseph
- Calhoun County Public Health Department: Calhoun
- Central Michigan District Health Department: Arenac, Clare, Gladwin, Isabella, Osceola and Roscommon
- Chippewa County Health Department: Chippewa
- Dickinson-Iron District Health Department: Dickinson and Iron
- District Health Department #2: Alcona, Iosco, Ogemaw, and Oscoda
- District Health Department #4: Alpena, Cheboygan, Montmorency, and Presque Isle
- District Health Department #10: Crawford, Kalkaska, Lake, Manistee, Mason, Mecosta, Missaukee, Newaygo, Oceana, and Wexford
- Genesee County Health Department: Genesee
- Grand Traverse County Health Department: Grand Traverse
- Health Department of Northwest Michigan: Antrim, Charlevoix, Emmet, and Otsego
- Huron County Health Department: Huron
- Ingham County Health Department: Ingham
- Ionia County Health Department: Ionia
- Jackson County Health Department: Jackson
- Kalamazoo County Health & Community Services Department: Kalamazoo
- Kent County Health Department: Kent
- Lapeer County Health Department: Lapeer
- Livingston County Health Department: Livingston
- Luce-Mackinac-Alger-Schoolcraft District Health Department: Alger, Luce, Mackinac and Schoolcraft
- Macomb County Health Department: Macomb
- Marquette County Health Department: Marquette
- Mid-Michigan District Health Department: Clinton, Gratiot and Montcalm
- Midland County Health Department: Midland
- Monroe County Health Department: Monroe
- Oakland County Health Division: Oakland
- Ottawa County Department of Public Health: Ottawa
- Public Health, Delta & Menominee Counties: Delta and Menominee
- Public Health – Muskegon County: Muskegon
- Saginaw County Health Department: Saginaw
- Sanilac County Health Department: Sanilac
- Shiawassee County Health Department: Shiawassee
- St. Clair County Health Department: St. Clair
- Tuscola County Health Department: Tuscola
- Van Buren/Cass District Health Department: Cass and Van Buren
- Washtenaw County Health Department: Washtenaw
- Wayne County Department of Health, Veterans & Community Wellness: Wayne
- Western Upper Peninsula Health Department: Baraga, Gogebic, Houghton, Keweenaw, and Ontonagon
