= Michigan State Capitol =

State capitol building of the U.S. state of Michigan

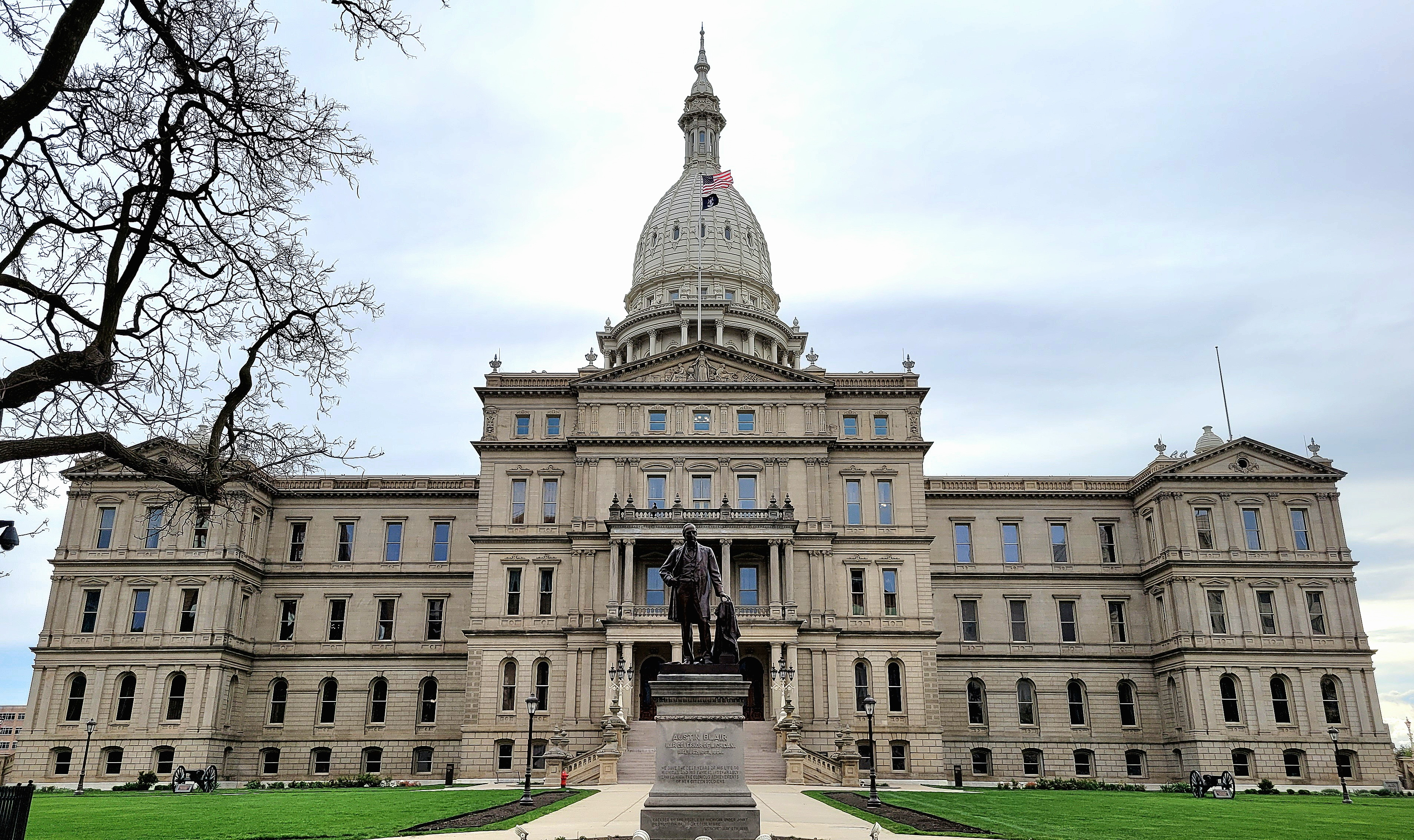
- A statue of Austin Blair stands in the foreground

General information
- Architectural style: Neoclassical/Italianate/Renaissance revival
- Location: 100 N Capitol Ave, Lansing, Michigan, U.S.
- Coordinates: 42°44′01″N 84°33′20″W
- Groundbreaking: 1872; 154 years ago
- Construction started: Cornerstone laid: October 2, 1873; 153 years ago
- Completed: September 26, 1878; 148 years ago
- Inaugurated: January 1, 1879; 147 years ago
- Renovated: 1989–1992; 2010–2014
- Cost: $1,427,738.78

Height
- Height: 267 ft (81 m)

Dimensions
- Diameter: 128 m × 83.5 m (420 ft × 274 ft)

Technical details
- Lifts/elevators: 2

Design and construction
- Architect: Elijah E. Myers

Website
- Capitol Building; Your State Capitol
- Michigan State Capitol
- U.S. National Register of Historic Places
- U.S. National Historic Landmark
- Michigan State Historic Site
- Architectural style: Renaissance Revival
- MPS: Downtown Lansing MRA (AD)
- NRHP reference No.: 71000396

Significant dates
- Added to NRHP: January 25, 1971; 55 years ago
- Designated NHL: October 5, 1992; 34 years ago
- Designated MSHS: February 18, 1956

The Michigan State Capitol is the building that houses the legislative branch of the government of the U.S. state of Michigan. It is in the portion of the state capital of Lansing which lies in Ingham County.

The present structure, at the intersection of Capitol and Michigan Avenues, is a National Historic Landmark that houses the chambers and offices of the Michigan Legislature as well as the ceremonial offices of the Governor of Michigan and Lieutenant Governor. Historically, this is the third building to house the Michigan government.

The first state capitol was in Detroit, the original capital of Michigan, and was relocated to Lansing in 1847, due to the need to develop the state's western portion and for better defense from British troops stationed in Windsor, Ontario.

== First ==
On July 13, 1787, the Second Continental Congress passed the Northwest Ordinance, creating the Northwest Territory which included Michigan. In 1805, the U.S. Congress created the Michigan Territory, with Detroit as its territorial capital. Michigan first applied for statehood as early as 1832, though it was rebuffed due to a dispute with Ohio over the Toledo Strip, a 468-square mile (1,210 km^{2}) area that included the important port city of Toledo. By 1835, Michigan had formed a state government without receiving authorization from Congress to do so. The state's boundaries included the contested area.

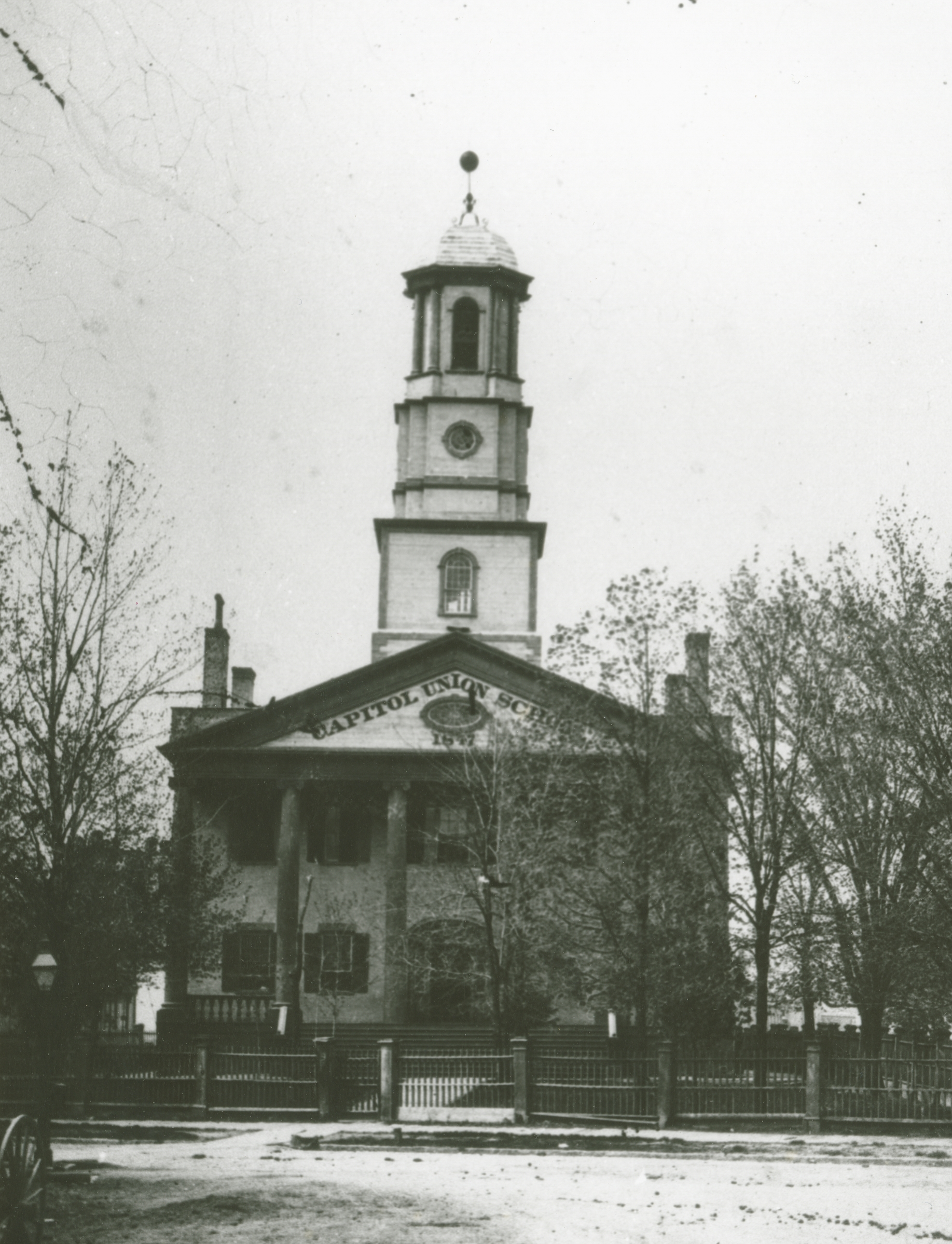
Original capitol in Detroit c. 1847

The dispute culminated in what has become known as the Toledo War, as Michigan and Ohio militia took up arms in the area. As a condition for entering the Union, Michigan was forced to accept the western three-quarters of the Upper Peninsula in exchange for ceding its claim to the Toledo Strip. After a state convention first rejected this condition, a second convention, assembled under some duress in December 1836, reluctantly accepted the terms and Michigan became the 26th state on January 26, 1837, with Detroit as its first capital.

The first building to serve as the State Capitol was built in 1832 as the Territorial Courthouse. The court house was on the corner of Griswold Street and State Street. This brick structure was one of Michigan's earliest Greek revival buildings, with a portico of Ionic columns and a central tower of 140 feet (43 m). Built at a cost of $24,500 ($790,000 in 2025), the building housed the territorial government and state legislatures until 1848, when a hastily erected wood building was constructed in Lansing following a decision made March 17, 1847, to move the capital from Detroit to Lansing. The Detroit building then became a public school (the Union School, at one time the city's only high school) and library until it burned in 1893.

In accordance with his wishes, Michigan's territorial governor and first state governor Stevens T. Mason, who died in New York City in 1843, was interred at the site now known as Capitol Park in a 1905 ceremony attended by Mason's 92-year-old sister and other relatives, Governor Fred M. Warner and Detroit Mayor George P. Codd.

A bronze statue of Mason was erected over the grave and remained until 2009 when Detroit officials announced a plan to remodel the park and move the grave several yards east. Initial efforts to locate the burial were unsuccessful however it was found a few yards south of its original site. Before Stevens was re-interred for the fourth time, his coffin was transported to Lansing to lay in state in the current capitol building. The current interment is in an above-ground vault in the base of the statue.

== Second ==
The 1835 Michigan Constitution provided that:

The seat of government for this state shall be at Detroit, or at such other place or places as may be prescribed by law until the year eighteen hundred and forty-seven when it shall be permanently located by the legislature.

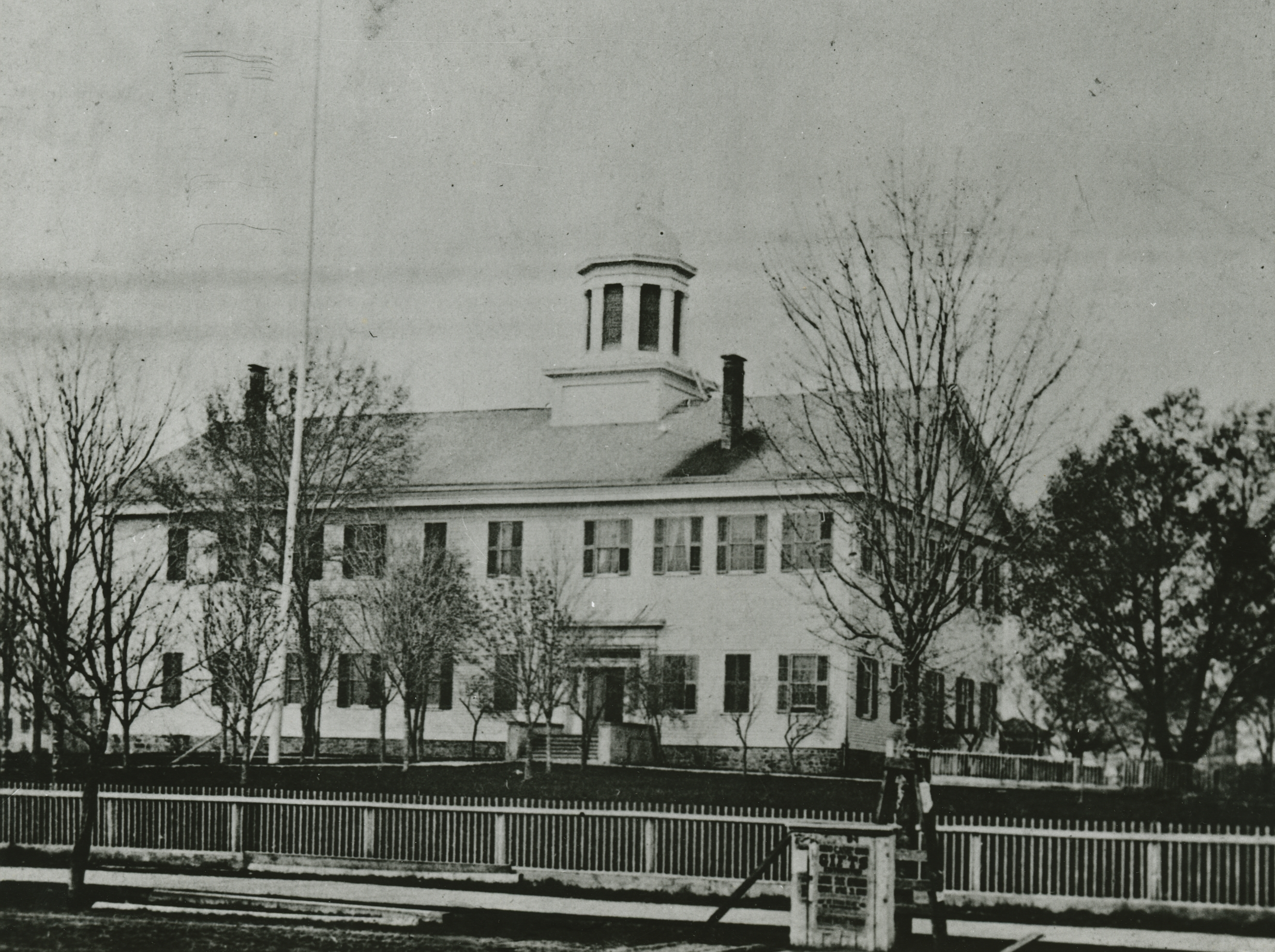
The original Lansing structure before 1882

Prior to 1847, Detroit fought to maintain the Capitol within its jurisdiction, but communities in the growing western part of the state had many reasons for wanting a move inland, including the need to increase defensibility by moving the state government away from the Canada–US border. Detroit had been occupied during the War of 1812, and the border area of Michigan of less than a mile between Detroit and Windsor, Ontario, at the Detroit River continued to be occupied by British troops on both banks. Proponents of moving the capitol also sought to promote settlement and the economy in the interior, as well as making the government more accessible to the people throughout the state.

Contenders seeking designation as the new Capitol included Ann Arbor, Jackson, Grand Rapids, and Shiawassee Township in Shiawassee County. At one point during the debate, Marshall officials were so certain of its selection that they built a governor's mansion. After extensive debate, State Senator Joseph H. Kilbourne of Ingham County proposed that the nearly uninhabited Lansing Township be made the seat of government. The legislature agreed, with the location north of Ann Arbor, west of Detroit, and east of Grand Rapids being deemed a suitable compromise. The legislature renamed it as the Town of Michigan, though by 1848 the original name of Lansing was restored.

Construction began in 1847 on the state capitol building in Lansing, a temporary structure on the block bordered by Washington Avenue, Capitol Avenue, Allegan Street, and Washtenaw Street. It was a simple two-story wood-frame structure, painted white with green wooden shutters and topped by a tin cupola. The total cost for construction was $22,952.01 ($790,000 in 2025). The building was sold when the permanent capitol building opened in 1879. It was then used as a factory until, like the first capitol, it was destroyed by a fire in 1882.

== Third ==
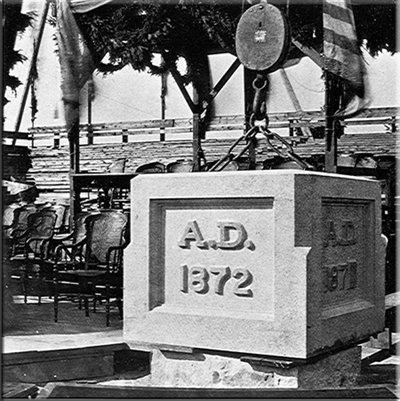
The cornerstone for the current state capitol being lowered into place

In the early 1870s, Governor Henry P. Baldwin urged the legislature to fund a new, permanent capitol. On March 31, 1871, a bill was adopted "for the erection of a new state capitol, and a building for the temporary use of the state officers". The new capitol was to cost $1.2 million ($32,000,000 in 2025), to be raised by a six-year state income tax.

In 1872, architect Elijah E. Myers of Springfield, Illinois, was commissioned to design the new capitol building and the design committee selected his design named Tuebor, which means I will defend. Myers used the central dome and wing design found in the United States Capitol in his design and subsequently went on to design two other state capitol buildings, the statehouses of Colorado and Texas, as well as the former territorial capitol building of Idaho, the most by any architect. The cornerstone was laid on October 2, 1873, with about 7,000 Lansing residents and some 30,000 to 50,000 visitors attending. Construction and finishing work were completed by late 1878. The new capitol, with 139 rooms, was dedicated at the same time as the inauguration of Governor Charles Croswell January 1, 1879.

The Lansing capitol building inspired a national trend after the American Civil War for fireproof buildings, large enough to house expanding government as well as serving as a durable repository for artifacts of the war, including battle flags that were moved to the Michigan Historical Museum in 1990. Over the years the dome, which at first matched the light tan of the building, was repainted a bright white. The legislature funded an extensive historical restoration starting in 1989 which was completed in 1992. The restoration returned the dome to a creamy-white shade, upgraded mechanical systems, and improved accessibility as well as restoring many of the original design elements. One of the restoration's largest phases entailed removal of "half-floors" that were installed in 1969 to create 50,000 square feet (4,600 m^{2}) of additional office space. The floors were created by dividing the 16-foot (4.9 m)-high rooms horizontally and creating a level of rooms which was accessed from the stairway landing. The Capitol Building was listed on the National Register of Historic Places January 25, 1971 (NRHP Reference #71000396), and was designated as a National Historic Landmark October 5, 1992.

=== Building ===
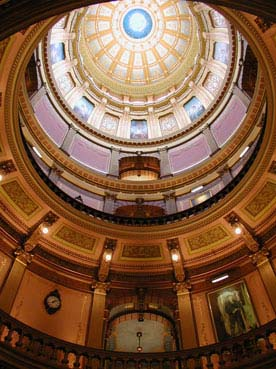

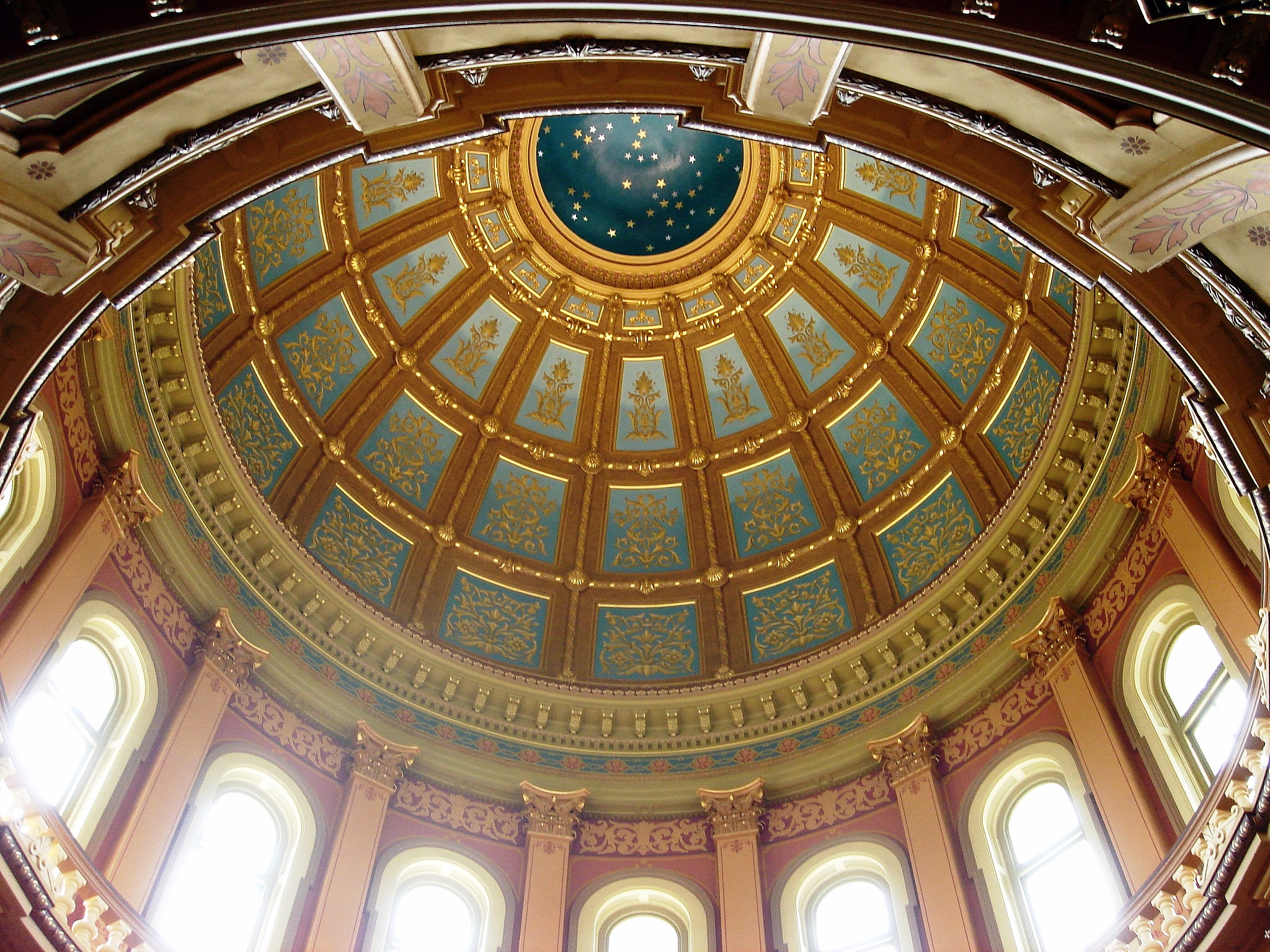
Interior of the capitol dome

The Michigan State Capitol is 267 feet (81 metres) from the ground to the tip of finial/spire above the dome. The building is 420 ft 2 in (128.07 m) long and 273 ft 11 in (83.49 m) wide (including approaches). The capitol occupies 1.16 acres (4,700 m^{2}), has a perimeter of 1,520 ft (460 m). The structure contains four stories, with public entrances on the ground floor. Two grand staircases in the north and south corridors go up to the top floor. The rotunda measures 44.5 feet (13.6 m) in diameter and 160 feet (49 m) in height measured from the floor to the oculus.

When it opened, the Capitol structure was large enough to host all the state agencies and departments. Due to the growth of state government, only the offices of Senate and House leadership and ceremonial offices for the governor and lieutenant governor remain in the capitol. The ground floor corridors led to "store rooms" designed by the architect in the original building plans. This includes an armory in the southwest corner of the south corridor. The original wood floor has been replaced by gray tiles. The rooms were originally lit with gas fixtures, though by 1900, the building had been refitted with electric lights. Today, the ground floor is home to several offices, including the Secretary of the Senate, the Clerk of the House, and the Capitol Tours and Information Service.

On the three primary floors, black and white floor tile is made of Vermont marble and limestone. The exception is the floor of the rotunda which is composed of 976 blocks of translucent glass, supported by iron beams and columns. It is a vault light, admitting light to the floor below. The blocks vary in size so that when viewed from the upper floors, they appear to form a bowl which mirrors the dome above.

The doorknobs are mostly made of a brass and bronze alloy (most of the original brass doorknobs have disappeared over time). The present doorknobs and hinges, locked for protection, display the state coat of arms. Though the building appears to have walnut woodwork, the wood is Michigan white pine that has been wood-grained to give the appearance of walnut.

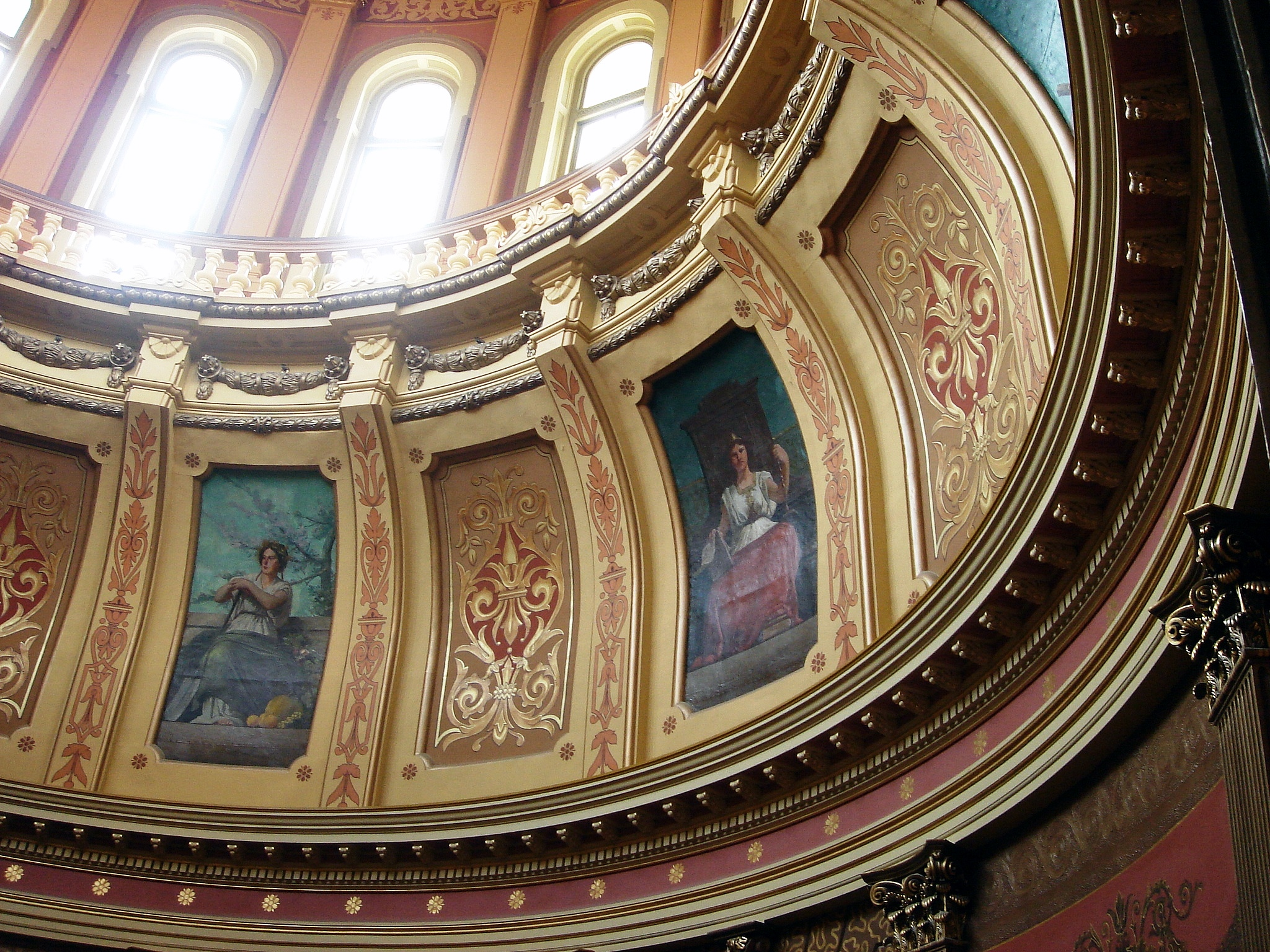
Muses

The first floor gives visitors their first view of the interior of the rotunda. Below the cast-iron dome, the ceiling displays eight muses painted in 1886. For more than a century, the muses' artist remained anonymous; it is now known that it was Tommaso Juglaris, who created them in his Boston studio and never came to Michigan. In the east wing of the first floor is a large clock, called a long-drop clock. It was once the building's master clock and is at least as old as the Capitol. The clock was restored in 1990 and is in working condition.

The second floor, in addition to housing the gubernatorial offices, features the Gallery of Governors with portraits of former Michigan Governors on the walls of the rotunda; the gallery extends up to the third floor. The governor's offices were among the most extensively restored during the 1989–1992 restoration. The office features a suite of original furnishings manufactured in 1876 by the Feige Brothers Company of Saginaw. The former chambers of the Michigan Supreme Court are in the south wing of the building. The court vacated its chambers in 1970 for larger quarters, eventually moving to its current location in the Michigan Hall of Justice. The room is now used by the Senate Appropriations Committee and named for longtime chairman Harry Gast.

Public access to Michigan's legislative bodies is through the third floor. The capitol building holds the chambers and offices of the bicameral state legislature, which is composed of the Michigan House of Representatives and Michigan Senate. Public galleries are at both ends of the third floor. The Senate, with 38 members, has its chambers on the south side of the building, while the House of Representatives, with 110 members, has its chambers in the north wing. House sessions are normally held on Tuesdays and Wednesdays at 1:30 PM and Thursdays at 12:00 noon, while Senate sessions begin at 10:00 AM on Tuesdays, Wednesdays, and Thursdays. Both houses occasionally convene on Mondays and Fridays. Senate and House sessions are taped by Michigan Government Television, a public service body transmitted to local cable television systems' government-access television channels. Similar to C-SPAN, MGTV has made live coverage of the legislative proceedings available since July 15, 1996.

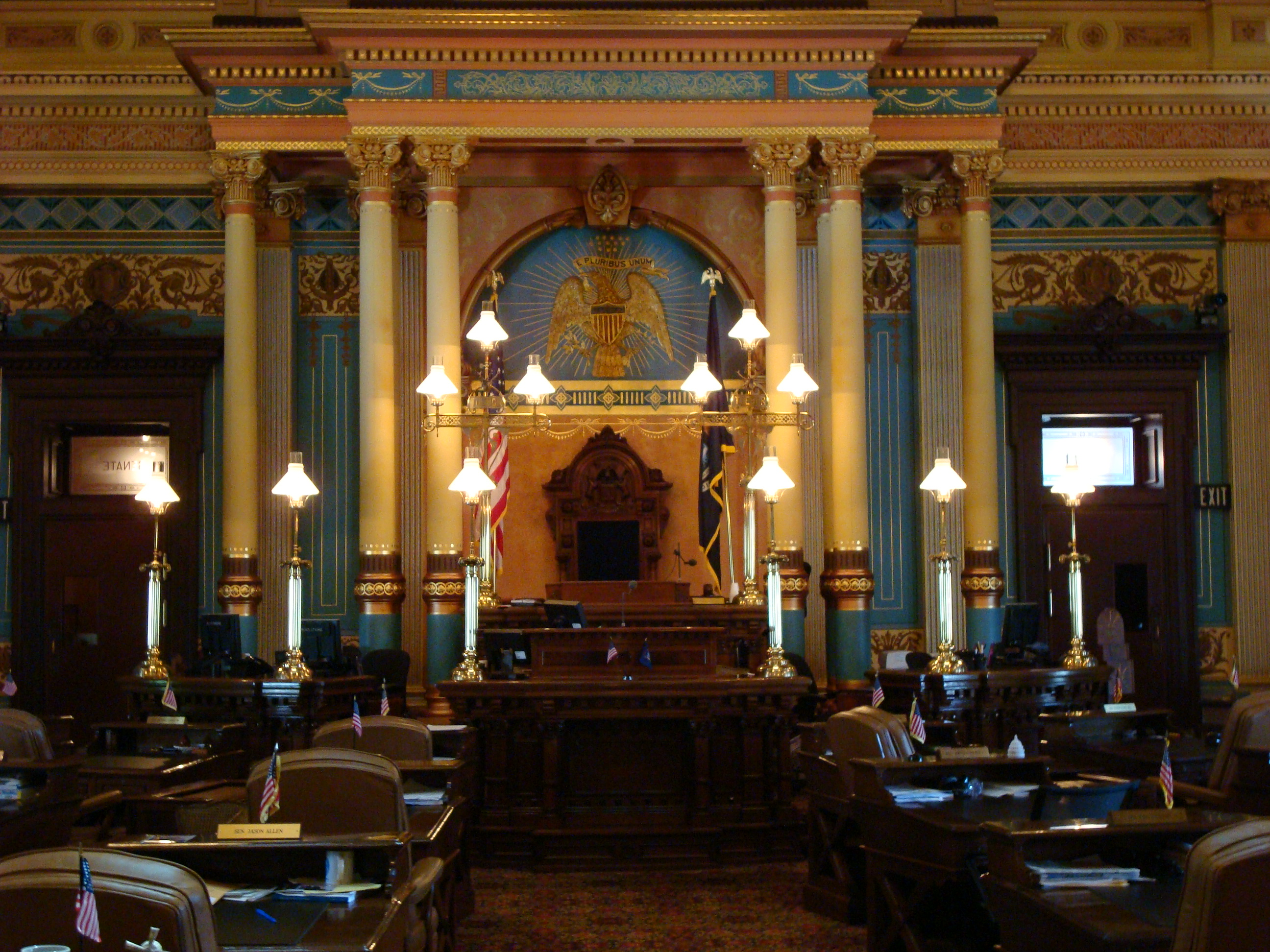
State Senate chambers

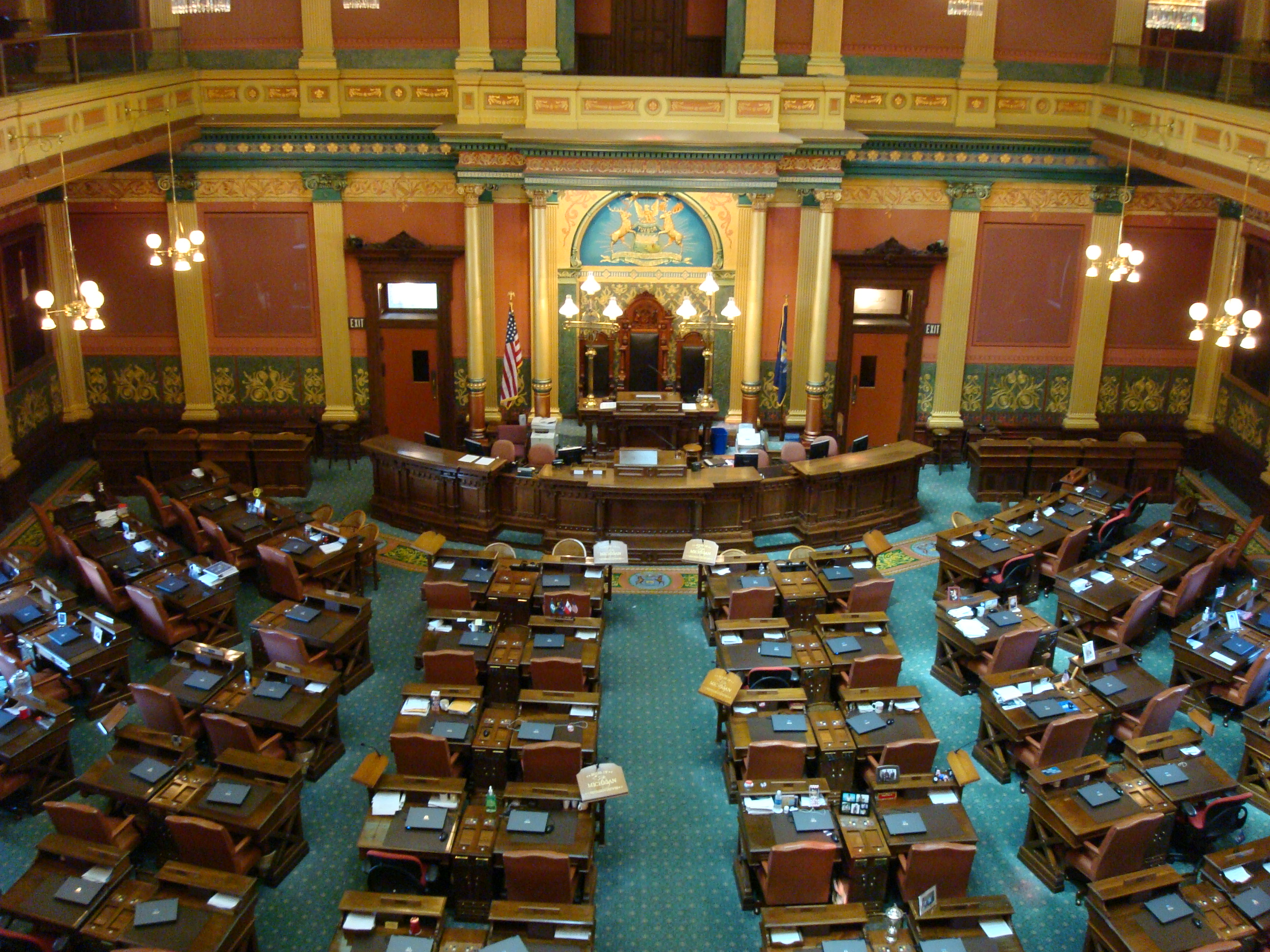
House of Representatives chambers

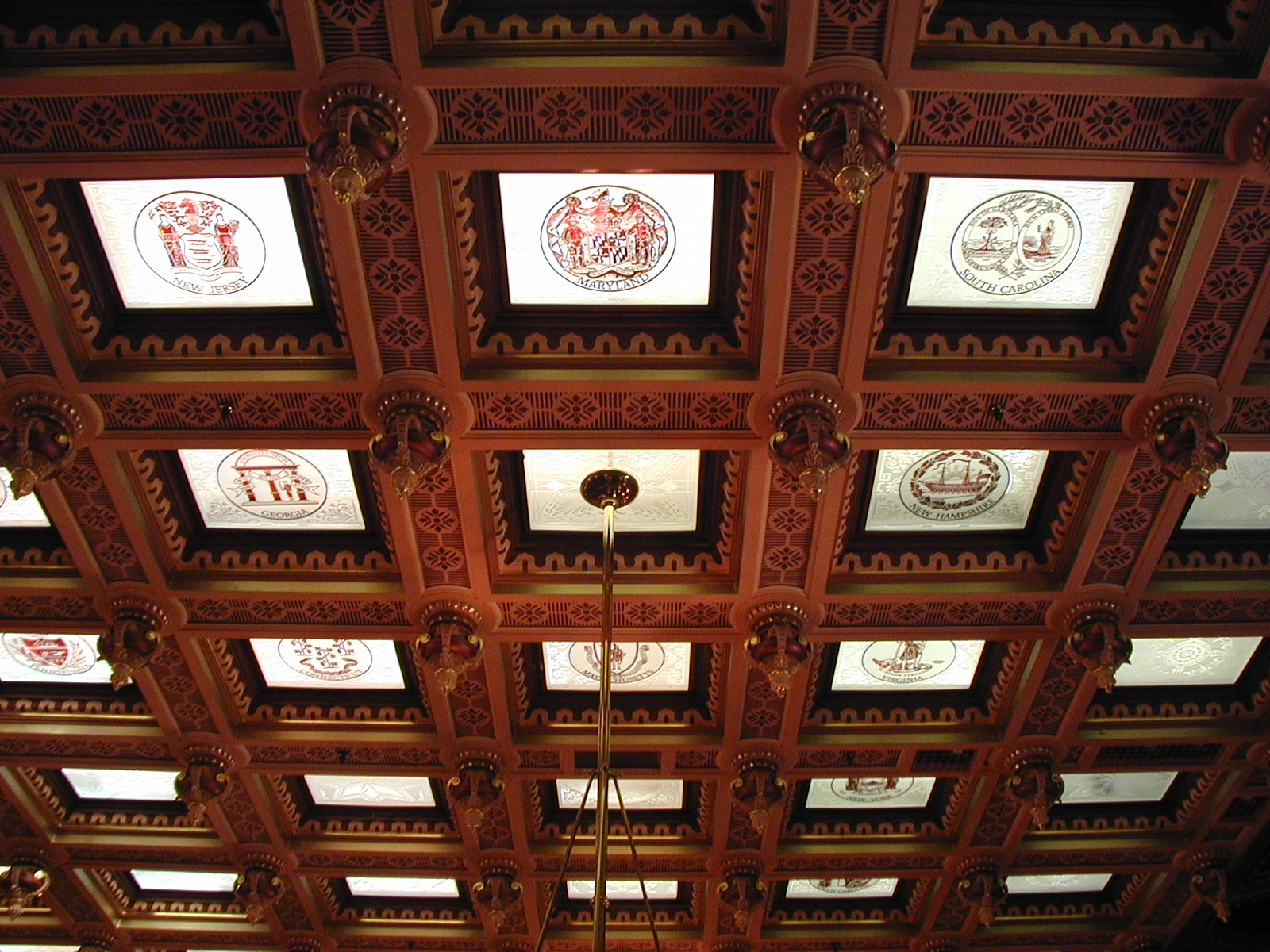
Tiled ceiling bearing each state's coat of arms

Although having the same floor plan, the House and Senate chambers are decorated very differently, with the former in terra cotta and teal colors and the latter in blue and gold. An oval cartouche in the carpet at the entrance to the House chamber features the state flower, the apple blossom. Presiding over the house is the speaker, whose chair is behind a desk in the center with a plaster and paint version of the state coat of arms. The Senate chamber is somewhat smaller than the House. The president of the Senate is the lieutenant governor, who presides over sessions from a walnut rostrum at the front of the chamber. Both the House and the Senate use computerized voting systems, including wall-mounted screens that allow visitors to follow the voting and both also contain glass tiled ceilings that allow natural light to shine through etched glass panels to better light the room. These ceiling tiles feature the coats-of-arms of each state in the United States.

In summer 2013, the structure underwent additional work to replace carpeting installed in the 1989–1992 renovation that had become worn and frayed in many areas. Work also upgraded wiring for communications systems, repaired roof leaks and upgraded a handicapped parking area and entrance on the north side.

In July 2023, the Michigan State Capitol Commission began another restoration project in the rotunda. The work aimed to clean and restore the painted surfaces on the inner dome and followed earlier work that replaced mechanical systems and windows in the upper part of the dome and lantern. The work completed in April 2024, approximately one month earlier than planned and under the budgeted $3 million.

=== Grounds ===
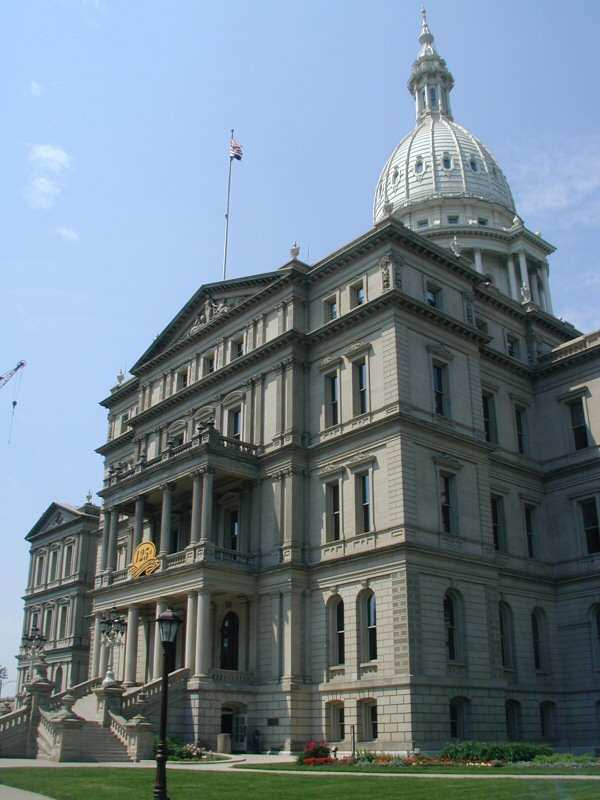
Michigan State Capitol

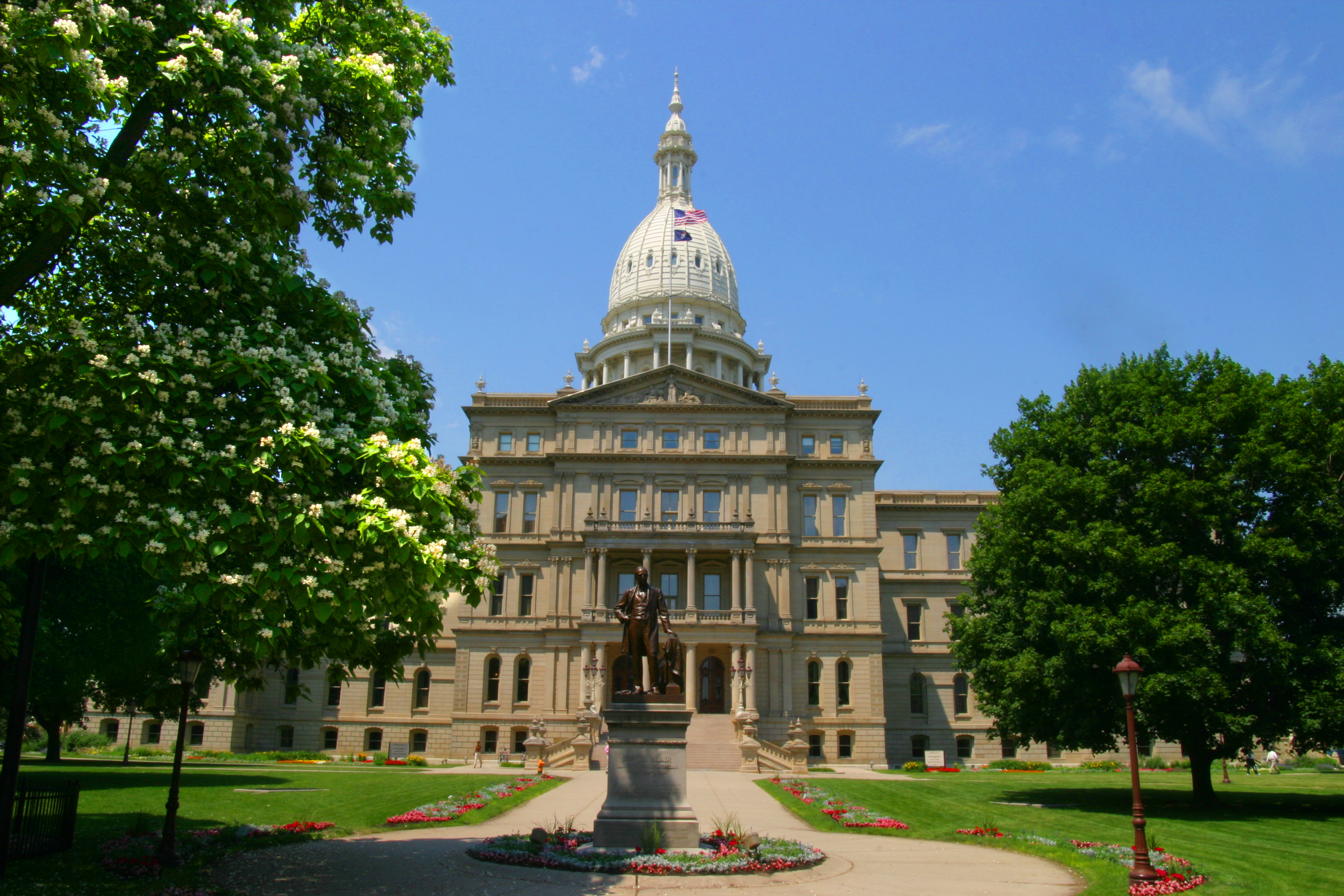
The Michigan Capitol Building with the Catalpa Tree in Blossom on the left.

The Capitol Pediment, located above the main front entrance to the building, is entitled "The Rise and Progress of Michigan". It depicts a central figure, Michigan, who is dressed as a Native American. She offers a book and globe to the people of her state, promising a bright future. She is surrounded by symbols of Michigan's economy, including a plow, cornucopia, and a laurel wreath to represent agriculture. Also included are symbols representing shipping, mining, and lumbering.

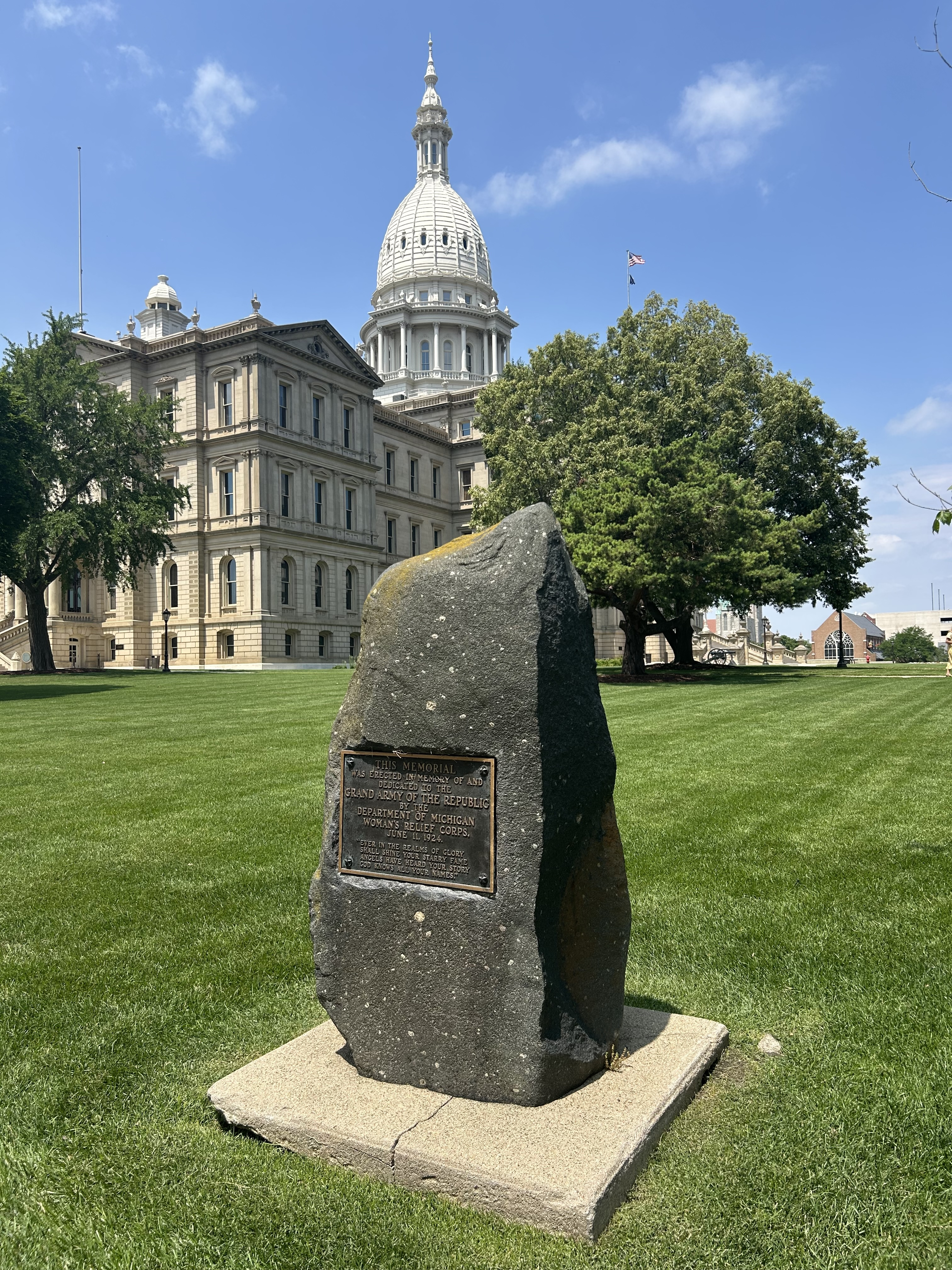
Grand Army of the Republic Memorial with the Capitol building in the background

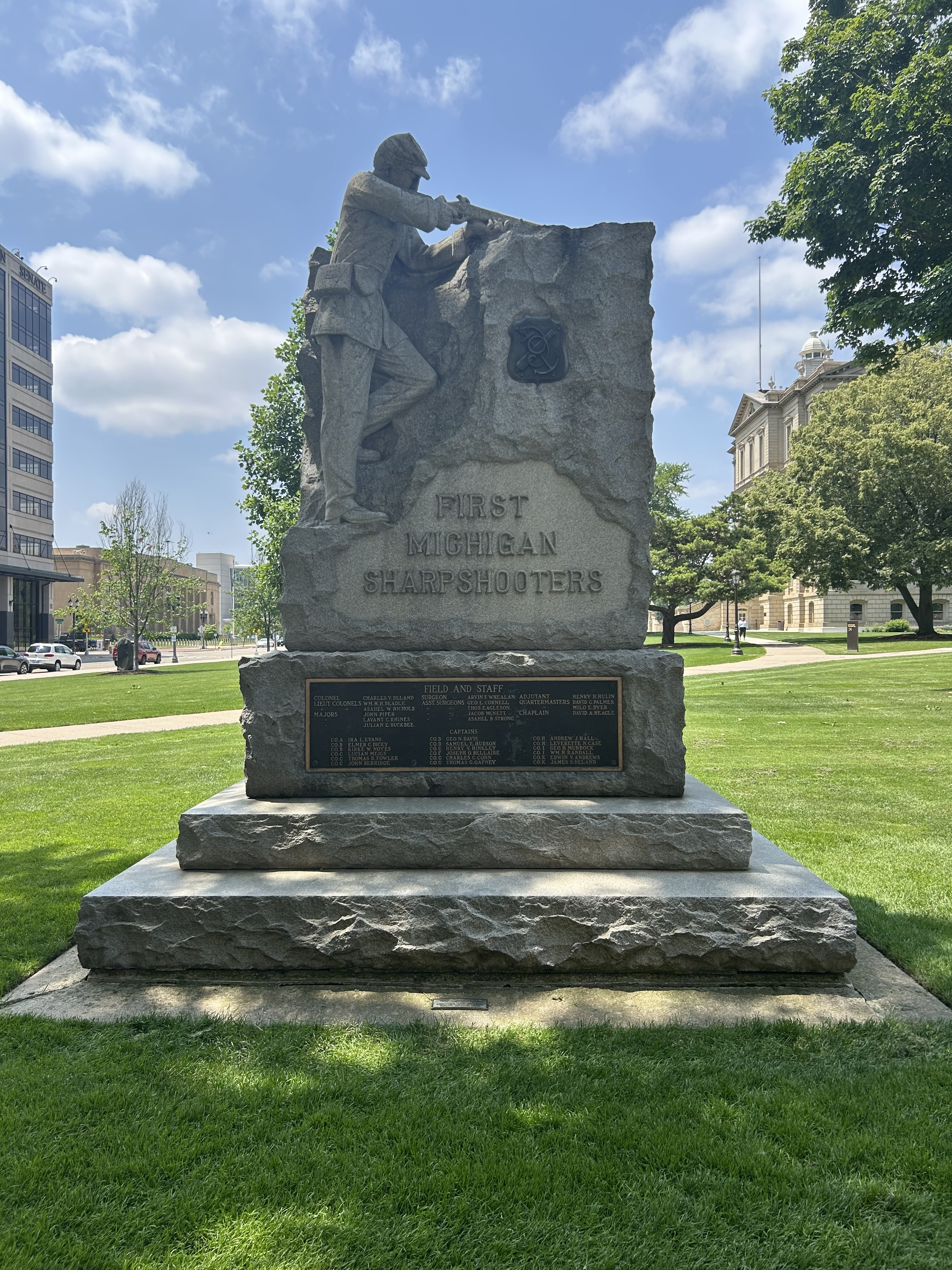
First Michigan Sharpshooters Monument

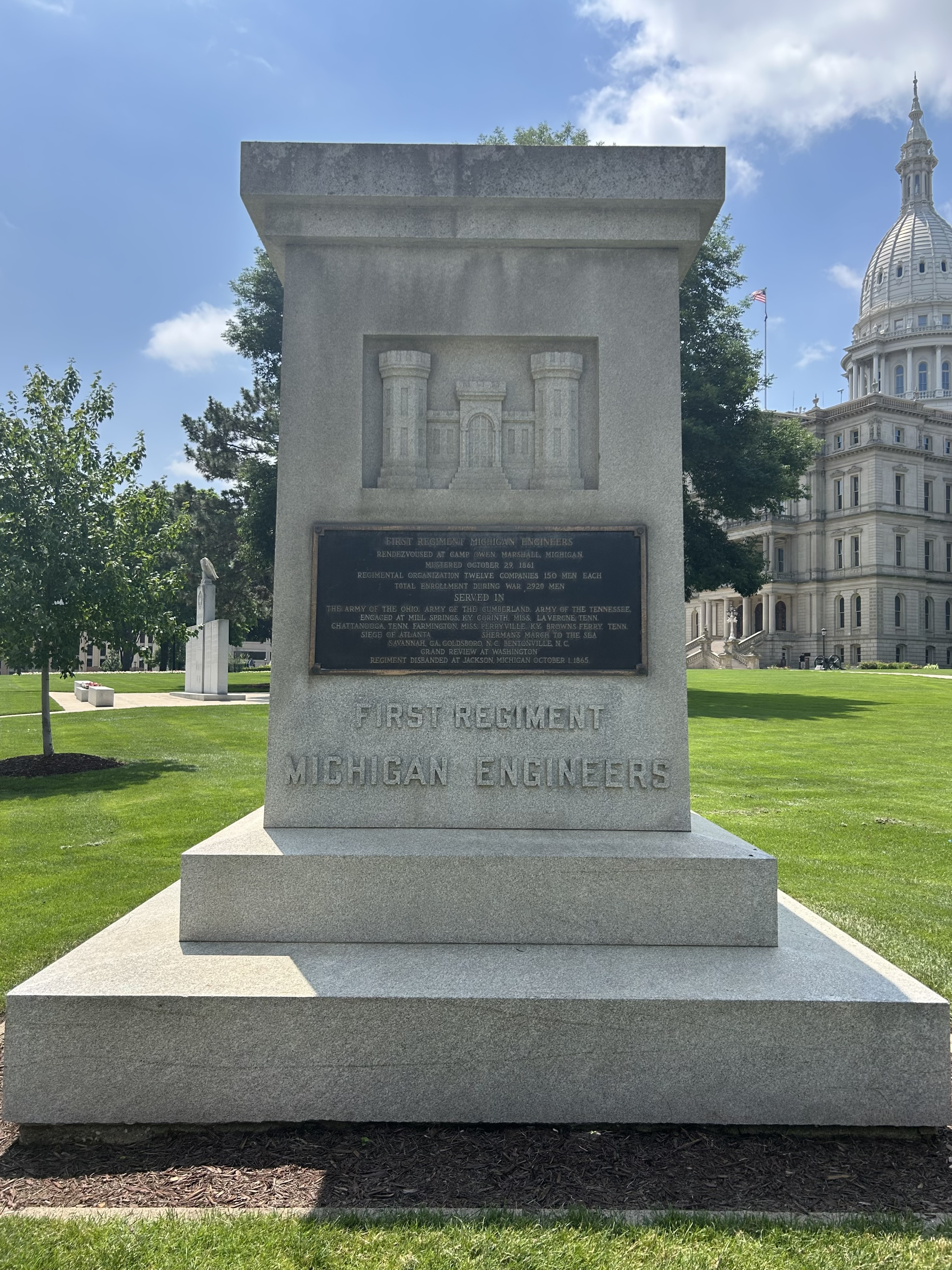
First Regiment Michigan Engineers Monument

The cornerstone, located at the northeast corner of the building, bears the dates 1872, the start of construction, and 1878, the year of completion. The stone was opened during ceremonies November 15, 1978, the centennial of the building's completion. Various documents enclosed within the stone had been damaged by moisture, although several coins from the era remained intact. Officials closed and resealed with stone with 38 new items depicting Michigan's history, people, and lifestyles. At the lawn's southeast corner is the Grand Army of the Republic Memorial, a 1924-bronze plaque attached to a boulder as a memorial to American Civil War veterans who fought for the Union. Nearby stands another Civil War memorial, the First Michigan Sharpshooters Monument. It was dedicated in 1915 and funded by surviving members of the First Michigan Volunteer Sharpshooters regiment. The First Regiment Michigan Engineers Monument dedicated in 1912 is located at the opposite corner of the lawn.

The grounds have several notable trees. An Eastern White Pine, the state tree of Michigan, is located at the east front of the building. The Dr. Martin Luther King Jr. Tree was planted in memory of the slain leader in 1984 to the north of the statue of Austin Blair. The oldest tree on the grounds is a catalpa on the southeast lawn present when the Capitol was dedicated in 1873. The American Forestry Association has certified this catalpa is the largest living tree of its kind in the United States. The most recently dedicated tree is a blue spruce called "the Freedom Tree," planted in 1973 as a memorial to the Vietnam War's missing-in-action and prisoners of war.

== See also ==
- List of Michigan state legislatures
- List of state and territorial capitols in the United States
- April 30 storming of the Michigan State Capitol (2020)
