= MGTV =

MGTV may refer to:

- Mango TV
- Michigan Government Television, a defunct television channel in Michigan
- MGTV, a Globo local news program in Minas Gerais; see Praça TV
