= Government-access television =

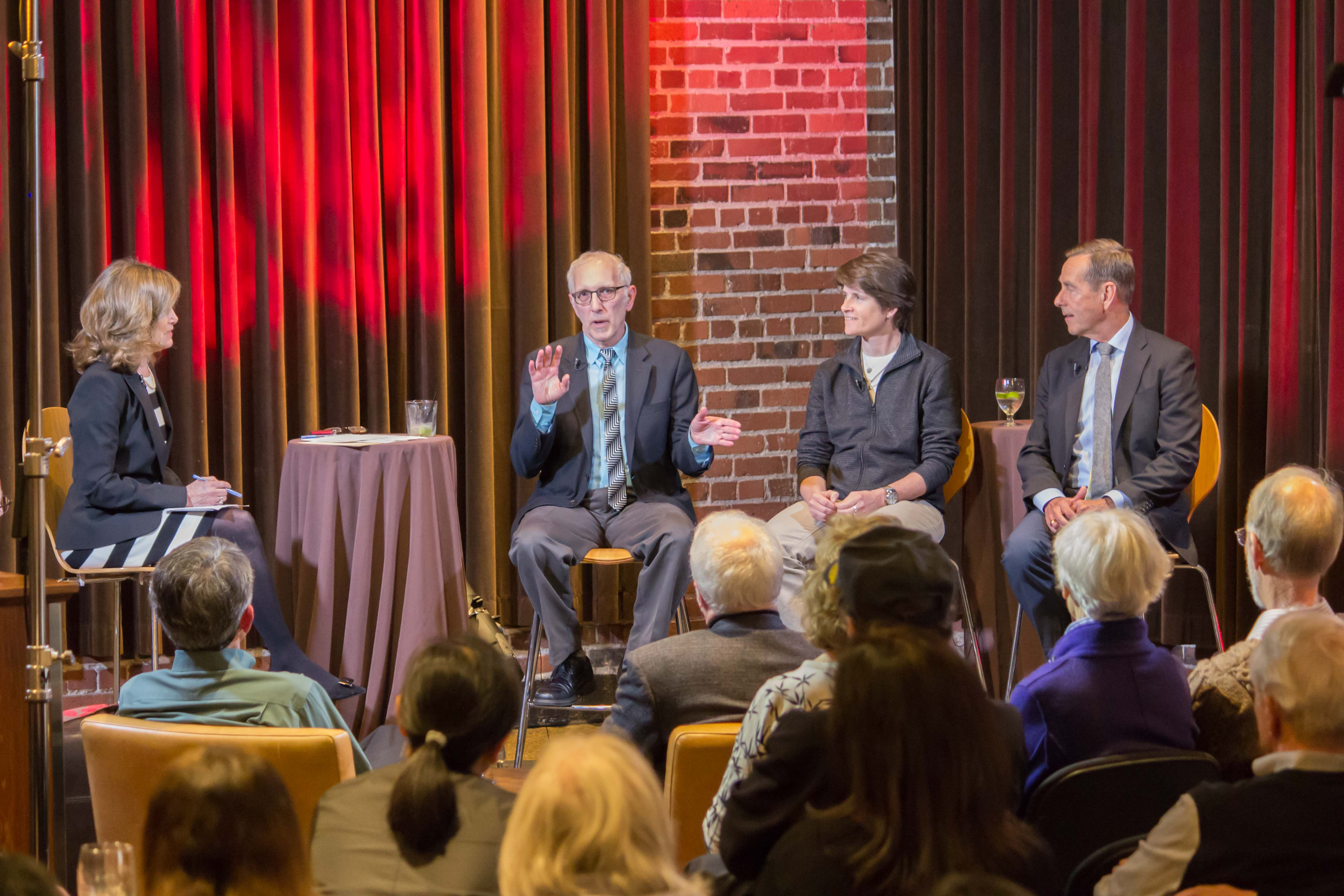
Members of the Seattle City Council interviewed on "Civic Cocktail" on the government-access television Seattle Channel, March 30, 2015.

In the United States, government-access television (GATV) is a type of specialty television channel created by government entities (generally local governments) and broadcast over cable TV systems or, in some cases, over-the-air broadcast television stations. GATV programming generally deals with public affairs, board meetings (i.e. municipal council, county commission, and school board), explanation of government services, and other public-service related programming such as public service announcements and longer public information films.

In the United States, laws regarding GATV are contained in the US Code, title 47, section 531, and are enforced by the Federal Communications Commission. Since cable systems are privately owned entities (unlike broadcast television), the must-carry requirement for GATV channels is often drawn out in local franchising agreements for the municipality or county it operates in.

GATV is often associated with public-access television, such as with the term PEG channels.

== Statewide government access channels ==
Statewide government access channels
U.S. state	Network
California	The California Channel (Defunct)
Connecticut	Connecticut Network
Florida	The Florida Channel
Illinois	Illinois Channel
Michigan	Michigan Government Television
Montana	TVMT
New York	NY-SCAN (defunct)
Ohio	The Ohio Channel
Oregon	The Oregon Channel (defunct)
Pennsylvania	Pennsylvania Cable Network
Washington	TVW (Washington)
Wisconsin	WisconsinEye

== See also ==
- C-SPAN
- Public, educational, and government access (PEG)
