= Campaign finance reform =

Campaign finance reform may refer to:

- Reform of campaign finance policies
- Campaign finance reform in the United States
