= Michigan Department of Technology, Management and Budget =

Principal department of Michigan, USA's government

Department overview
- Formed: 1984
- Preceding agencies: Michigan Department of Administration; Michigan Department of Management and Budget; Michigan Department of Civil Service; Michigan Department of Information Technology
- Type: principal department
- Department executives: Kyle Guerrant, Acting Director; Eric Swanson, Acting Chief Information Officer; Caleb Buhs, Chief Deputy Director
- Child agencies: State Administrative Board Civil Service Commission Office of Children's Ombudsman Office of the State Employer State Budget Office; State Building Authority; Financial Services; Office of Retirement Services; Human Resources; Business Services Administration Facilities Administration
- Key document: Management and Budget Act, Public Act 431 of 1984
- Website: michigan.gov/dtmb

The Michigan Department of Technology, Management and Budget (DTMB), formerly Michigan Department of Management and Budget, is a principal department of the state government of Michigan responsible for various support functions within the government.

== History ==
The Michigan Department of Administration was established in 1948 through Public Act 51 of 1948, under the administration of Michigan governor Kim Sigler. It replaced the less effective Michigan Department of Business Administration authorized in 1943. The department was dissolved to form the Michigan Department of Management and Budget.

The Michigan Department of Management and Budget (DMB) was formed in 1984 by the Management and Budget Act 431 of 1984, to become a principal department of the state government. Created within the department, under the same law, was the Office of the State Budget Director. In 1979, governor Jennifer Granholm created an autonomous Office of the State Employer within the department.

Under Executive Order No. 2007-30, the Michigan Department of Civil Service was abolished, and the Board of Ethics, the State Officers Compensation Commission, and the Civil Service Commission were transferred to the department on August 26, 2007. In 2009, then-governor Jennifer Granholm planned to merge the Department of Information Technology into this Department, naming current DIT Director as Director of the merged department and the current DIT Chief Deputy Director Phyllis Mellon as temporary director of the Department of Management and Budget. The previous director left to become senior vice president for finance and administration, Lansing Community College. The Executive Order renaming it was effective March 21, 2010.

On January 1, 2013, DTMB started the MiTV online portal and received the Michigan Government Television channel equipment when it was closed down in mid-January. MiTV would stream sessions of the state houses and other governmental meetings in place of the MGTV PEG channel.

DTMB currently supports the business operations of state agencies through a variety of services, including building management and maintenance, information technology, centralized contracting and procurement, budget and financial management, space planning and leasing, construction management, motor vehicle fleet operations, and oversight of the state retirement systems.

== Components ==
=== Autonomous entity ===
A number of autonomous entity are assigned to DTMB for budgeting and support purposes including the Civil Service Commission, a former department.

==== State Administrative Board ====
State Administrative Board
Agency overview
- Formed: February 23, 1921
- (etc.)
- Type: autonomous board
- Agency executive: Shelby Troub, Secretary of the State Administrative Board; (etc.)
- Parent agency: Michigan Department of Technology, Management and Budget
- Key document: Michigan Compiled Laws Chapter 17: State Administrative Board
- Website: mi.gov/state-ad-board

The State Administrative Board is a board of officials that oversees the administrative activities of all state departments and agencies. The Board approves contracts and leases, state capital outlay, and hears small claims against the state. Three standing committees (Finance and Claims Committee, Building Committee, and Transportation and Natural Resources Committee) exist to advise the Board on a course of action.

Members of the board are ex officio. The positions are the elected Governor, Lieutenant Governor, Secretary of State, and Attorney General; and the appointed State Treasurer, Superintendent of Public Instruction and Director of the Department of Transportation.

Office	Office holder
Governor	Gretchen Whitmer
Lieutenant Governor	Garlin Gilchrist
Secretary of State	Jocelyn Benson
Attorney General	Dana Nessel
State Treasurer	Rachael Eubanks
Superintendent of Public Instruction	Michael F Rice
Director of the Department of Transportation	Bradley C. Wieferich

==== Office of Child Advocate ====
Office of the Child Advocate
- Incumbent; Ryan Speidel
- Appointer: Governor
- Formation: 1994
- Website: mi.gov/oca

On December 12, 2023, Public Act 303 of 2023 changed the name of the Office of Children’s Ombudsman (OCO) to Office of the Child Advocate (OCA). The OCA is an independent state office assigned to the DTMB. The Governor appoints the Ombudsman with the State Senate's advice and consent. The OCO takes complaints regarding the child welfare system and investigates under its own power.

==== Office of the State Employer ====
Director of Office of the State Employer
- Incumbent; Lisa Estlund Olson
- Appointer: Governor
- Website: mi.gov/ose

The Office of the State Employer (OSE) is an independent state office assigned to the DTMB. The office Director is a member of the Governor's Cabinet. The Office is the Governor's designate representative in recognized employee organization negotiations and developing and implementing employment relations policy. This Office after consulting with department heads makes recommendations to the Civil Service Commission regarding pay scale and other benefits for non-exclusively represented employees.

==== State Budget Office ====
State Budget Director of State Budget Office
- Incumbent; Jen Flood
- Appointer: Governor
- Website: mi.gov/budget

The State Budget Office (SBO) is an independent state office assigned to the DTMB. SBO is led by the State Budget Director, who is a member of the Governor's Cabinet. The Office has responsibility for the executive branch budget and oversees the state's accounting functions including payroll. The office also includes the Office of Financial Management (OFM), Statewide Integrated Governmental Management Applications (SIGMA), Center for Educational Performance and Information (CEPI), and Office of Internal Audit Services (OIAS).

In addition to the above independent state offices assigned to DTMB, the department maintains several dependent agencies and offices.

==== Office of Retirement Services ====
The Office of Retirement Services (ORS) administers defined benefit, defined contribution, hybrid, and deferred compensation retirement programs for Michigan's state employees, public school employees, judges, state police, and National Guard. Plans for over 550,000 public servants and their families, representing 1 in 9 Michigan households.

Agency Services

DTMB's Agency Services division is responsible for delivering all technology solutions to state agency partners and in-turn, state agency citizen, tourist and business clients. This support spans the life-cycle of all technology solutions, from development through on-going maintenance and operational support. Collectively, Agency Services' goal is to leverage enterprise solutions to help reduce costs and standardize on similar platforms.

Archives of Michigan

The Archives of Michigan is responsible for preserving the records of Michigan government and other public institutions. The Archives were moved from the Michigan Department of Natural Resources to the Department of Technology, Management & Budget (DTMB) under Executive Order 2023-6 on December 1, 2023. The collections include documents, maps, photographs and film from private individuals and organizations. With documents dating back to 1792, the Archives of Michigan houses much of Michigan's record heritage. More than 80 million state and local government records and private papers, 300,000 photographs and 500,000 maps, plus films and audio tapes are available for research.

Office of Chief Technology Officer

The Office of the Chief Technology Officer primarily focuses on setting the technology strategy for the state of Michigan. The value of the state's investment in information technology is maximized by ensuring alignment with the agency services' functional requirements while reducing the underlying complexity and diversity of the underlying infrastructure. The office is also responsible for infrastructure and operations of the state's centralized information processing function, managing strategic vendor relationships and fostering innovation across the enterprise.

Center for Shared Solutions

DTMB's Center for Shared Solutions (CSS) provides enterprise governance, and delivery of services and products that are common to areas within state government. CSS also manages partnerships with local governments, educational institutions, and not-for-profits to leverage technology efficiencies across traditional organizational boundaries.

- Enterprise Service Delivery (Identity Management, eMichigan, Enterprise Document Management, Geographic Information System (GIS), Enterprise Information Management)
- Michigan Public Safety Communications System (MPSCS)
- Technology Partnerships with Federal/State/Local governments, educational institutions, and not-for-profits
- End User Support & DTMB Service Catalogs
- Enterprise Project Management Office (EPMO)

Office of Continuous Improvement

The Office of Continuous Improvement (OCI) leads statewide initiatives to improve work processes utilizing employee and Michigan resident feedback. OCI works with state agencies to improve their processes prior to investing in technology solutions. OCI’s services include training, facilitation, strategic planning and survey administration.

Cybersecurity and Infrastructure Protection

Cybersecurity and Infrastructure Protection (CIP) is responsible for identifying, managing, and mitigating both virtual and physical security risks and vulnerabilities within the State of Michigan. CIP provides cybersecurity services and protections for State of Michigan executive branch agencies and delivers continuous improvement programs and cyber security awareness to state employees. CIP is also responsible for physical security, 24-hour systems monitoring, and emergency response coordination for DTMB-managed facilities, as well as emergency management coordination, planning, and exercises for DTMB.

State Facilities Administration (SFA)

The State Facilities Administration (SFA) manages and maintains state owned facilities and properties including heating, ventilation, and air conditioning (HVAC) services, landscaping and energy management systems throughout the state of Michigan. SFA also provides facility design and construction management services for state agencies and colleges and universities implementing infrastructure improvements and new construction projects. SFA strategically manages the state’s portfolio of owned and leased space, providing agencies with services to meet changing space requirements, as well as handling land and surplus property dispositions.

Financial Services

Financial Services offers a broad range of services, including accounting services, departmental procurement and accounts payable processing, financial analysis, business planning, management-level reporting, automated billings, data collection and interfaces, as well as contract and lease management.

Michigan Center for Data and Analytics

On September 21, 2022, the Bureau of Labor Market Information and Strategic Initiatives (LMISI) was renamed to Michigan Center for Data and Analytics (MCDA) under Executive Order 2022-11. MCDA provides Michigan with the expertise to analyze large datasets, understand challenges, and evaluate solutions. The center is led by the state’s chief data officer, who is also responsible for initiatives around data sharing, open data, and privacy. The center is also the official source for the state’s labor market and population data. The Labor Market Information division produces Michigan employment, occupation, and industry data through partnerships with U.S. Department of Labor. The state demographer’s team analyzes Michigan’s changing population size and structure and manages the state’s relationship with the U.S. Census Bureau.

Office of Performance Management

The Office of Performance Management (OPM) works to continually enhance the DTMB's performance by offering a variety of services, including process improvement, metrics consulting, employee engagement, customer satisfaction, administration of policies and forms and other strategic initiatives.

Michigan’s Public Safety Communications System

The Michigan’s Public Safety Communications System (MPSCS) is an office of the DTMB. MPSCS ensures a stable, secure framework of interoperable communications for all state, federal, tribal, and private first responders.

Procurement

As the State of Michigan’s purchasing authority, Procurement Services oversees all aspects of high-level, complex bids for state agencies in accordance with Public Act 431 of 1984, the Management and Budget Act. Other responsibilities include managing programs like MiDEAL, a unique cooperative purchasing program that extends state contracts to local units of government. Procurement Services is also responsible for purchasing programs and initiatives that help expand business opportunities to low-income communities and underutilized business areas known as geographically disadvantaged business enterprises.

Office of Support Services

The Office of Support Services (OSS) strengthens the business operations and objectives of state government by offering cost effective, timely and high quality support services. OSS supplies a litany of services to state agencies, colleges and universities, local governments and certain non-profit organizations. These services include:

- Printing services
- Mail and delivery services
- Transportation services
- Storage and disposal of records
- Warehousing
- Processing of state and federal surplus property
- Centralized vehicle fleet and travel services
