= Center for Governmental Studies =

American think tank

The Center for Governmental Studies (CGS) was an American non-profit, nonpartisan organization founded in 1983, which provided 28 years of policy research and recommended improvements to political and government processes in California. It created innovative political and media solutions like the web-based Digital Democracy system to empower citizens and help them to become more engaged in their communities, state and local governments. CGS identified policy problems, conducted factual and legal research, built consensus for reforms, drafted model laws, shaped public opinion, educated the public and communicated with elected and opinion leaders. CGS ceased operations in 2011.

CGS developed a reputation for working across party lines and bringing together political leaders from both parties on projects that influenced legislation, campaign finance reporting and political discourse in California. During its active years, CGS pursued efforts such as campaign finance reform, state budget reform, and higher education funding and reform, as well as supplying fresh, analysis and data-based perspectives on issues such as term limits, ballot propositions, and open primaries.

In October 2011, the organization announced that it would be closing on October 20, 2011. The announcement cited a decline in funding, which the organization attributed to both the poor economy and a "dramatically polarized political environment", as reasons for the decision. The organization's founders, Bob Stern and Tracy Westen, were reportedly in negotiations with Claremont Graduate University to provide a base of operations.

== Legacy ==
In 1991, CGS established The California Channel, which it described as "the nation's largest satellite-fed, public affairs cable television channel, now serving close to six million homes with gavel-to-gavel coverage of the state legislature’s floor sessions and committee hearings, governor's press conferences and occasional California supreme Court oral arguments, and operated 24 hours a day by the California Cable Television Association."

CGS maintains PolicyArchive as a free public resource. It is a searchable digital archive of global, non-partisan public policy research. Its stated goal, "Ultimately, PolicyArchive will indefinitely preserve the life of public policy research, substantially increase its impact, and provide society at large with long-term access to the benefits of that important research." In 2008, CGS collected and bundled "Presidential Advisory '08", public policy recommendations from more than 20 think tanks, which it delivered to the new president-elect and also made them publicly available and searchable online. "The new policy collection emphasizes policy issues that currently dominate the national dialogue, including the economy, education, energy, foreign policy, healthcare, media, and national security. Think tanks from across the political spectrum have contributed their proposals to this collection, including Better World Campaign, Brookings, Common Cause, Center for American Progress, Center for the Study of the Presidency, National Center for Policy Analysis, and Urban Institute."

== Funding ==
As a non-profit organization, CGS relied on both individual and foundation support. Major funders were listed on their website. Between 2008 and the close of CGS in 2011, contributions to the group dropped by 80 percent and expenses exceeded income by $1.6 million, according to government records.
