= Michigan Department of Information Technology =

American state agency created in 2001

Agency overview
- Formed: October 14, 2001
- Dissolved: March 21, 2010
- Superseding agency: Department of Technology, Management, and Budget
- Type: principal department (defunct)
- Jurisdiction: Government of Michigan
- Agency executives: Kenneth Theis, department Director & Chief Information Officer, State of Michigan; Phyllis Mellon, chief deputy director
- Key document: Executive Order No. 2001 - 3

The Michigan Department of Information Technology (DIT) was a principal department of the Michigan state government created in 2001 to manage the use of technology in the government and was merged in 2010 into the Department of Management and Budget, then renamed the Department of Technology, Management, and Budget.

== History ==
Governor Engler created the department in 2001 via Executive Order to centralize information from all the principal departments.

In 2009, Governor Jennifer Granholm merged the Department into Department of Management and Budget naming the then DIT Director as director of the department, and the current DIT deputy director as temporary director of the Department of Management and Budget. The Executive Order was effective on March 21, 2010.
