= Michigan Office of Retirement Services =

Agency of the US state

The Michigan Office of Retirement Services (ORS) administers retirement programs for Michigan's state employees, public school employees, judges, state police, and National Guard. ORS also provides various retiree healthcare benefits, including traditional insurance plans, Personal Healthcare Funds, and Health Reimbursement Accounts. ORS serves over 530,000 customers (approximately 227,000 active and 281,500 retired), representing one out of every fourteen Michigan adults. ORS customers live in approximately one out of every nine Michigan households. The state employee system and the public school employee system administered by ORS make up 95 percent of all active plan membership in Michigan. ORS is responsible for the 18th largest public pension system in the United States and the 47th largest pension system in the world, managing combined net assets of nearly $67.8 billion. In fiscal year 2017, ORS paid out over $7.3 billion in pension and health benefits. According to the Pensionomics 2016 report from the National Institute on Retirement Security, pensions paid to Michigan retirees generated $11.1 billion in total spending in the state of Michigan. A Pew study ranks ORS in the top ten state pension systems for paying the highest percentage of their annual required contribution for pension plans, which demonstrates a commitment to fiscal responsibility. ORS is a division of Michigan's Department of Technology, Management, and Budget (DTMB).

== History ==
The five retirement systems for which ORS provides services were separately established through public acts passed by the Michigan Legislature as early as 1942 and as recently as 1992. The systems evolved over time as the original legislation was amended, most recently due to the recent economic crisis. ORS moved to the Stevens T. Mason building in July 2015, as part of a larger move of state departments.

Retirement System	Establishing Legislation	Plans Administered
State Employees’ Retirement System	Michigan Public Act 240 of 1943	Defined Benefit Defined Contribution Deferred Compensation
Military Retirement System	Michigan Public Act 150 of 1967	Defined Benefit
Michigan Public School Employees' Retirement System	Michigan Public Act 300 of 1980	Defined Benefit Defined Contribution Pension Plus (hybrid) Deferred Compensation
Michigan State Police Retirement System	Michigan Public Act 182 of 1986	Defined Benefit Defined Contribution Pension Plus (hybrid) Deferred Compensation
Judges Retirement System	Michigan Public Act 234 of 1992	Defined Benefit Defined Contribution Deferred Compensation

== System detail ==
=== State Employees’ Retirement System ===
The State Employees’ Retirement System covers Civil Service employees, appointed officials in the executive branch, and employees of the legislature and judiciary branch. A ten-member board oversees the State Employees’ Retirement System. As of September 30, 2017, the system serves 10,850 active members and 59,684 retirees and beneficiaries. Effective March 31, 1997, all new enrollees participate in the Defined Contribution plan. The net assets of the Defined Benefit plan, valued at $13.9 billion as of September 30, 2017, are invested by the Michigan Department of Treasury, Bureau of Investments. In fiscal year 2017, the system paid Defined Benefit retirement pensions totaling $1.3 billion. While the State Employees' Retirement System enrolls retirees and beneficiaries for health, prescription drug, dental, and vision benefits for both Defined Benefit and Defined Contribution plan customers, the State of Michigan Civil Service Commission administers the health benefits program. ORS provides customer education through outreach presentations and to related retiree organizations.

=== Military Retirement System ===
The State of Michigan provides a pension for all former members of the Michigan National Guard (Army or Air) who meet specific eligibility requirements. To receive the benefit, applicants must have reached age 55, separated from service, and have served a minimum of 19 years, 6 months and 1 day of active service in the State Defense Forces and Michigan National Guard. The benefit is paid at the rate of $600 annually, or $50 per month.

=== Michigan Public School Employees' Retirement System ===
The Michigan Public School Employees' Retirement System (MPSERS) collects and compiles employee wage, contribution, and service information from approximately 549 K-12 districts, 46 public school academy/charter schools, 7 universities, 28 community colleges, 55 intermediate school districts, and 10 libraries. A 13-member board provides oversight for the system. As of September 30, 2017, the system serves 203,981 active members and 213,989 retirees and beneficiaries. The net assets of the Michigan Public School Employees' Retirement System, valued at $52.2 billion as of September 30, 2017, are invested by the Michigan Department of the Treasury, Bureau of Investments. In fiscal year 2017, the system paid retirement pensions totaling $4.8 billion. The system also provides retirees and eligible dependents with comprehensive health, prescription drug, dental, and vision benefits at a cost of $548.2 million, for the year ending September 30, 2017. The Master Health Care Plan is a self-funded plan administered by Blue Cross Blue Shield of Michigan. ORS customer education provides Pre-Retirement Information Meetings to members and also provides information to related interest groups.

=== Michigan State Police Retirement System ===
The Michigan State Police Retirement System provides benefits for enlisted police officers in the State of Michigan and is governed by a ten-member board. As of September 30, 2017, the system serves 1,777 active members, and 3,062 retirees and beneficiaries. The net assets of the State Police Retirement System, valued at $1.5 billion as of September 30, 2017, are invested by the Michigan Department of Treasury, Bureau of Investments. In fiscal year 2017, the system paid retirement pensions totaling $130.2 million.

=== Judges Retirement System ===
The Judges Retirement System was established by the State of Michigan to provide retirement benefits to judges in the judicial branch of state government. The system also includes the Governor, Lieutenant Governor, Secretary of State, Attorney General, Auditor General, and the Court Administrator. As of September 30, 2017, the Defined Benefit plan covered 100 active members, and 551 retirees and beneficiaries. Effective March 31, 1997, all new enrollees participate in the Defined Contribution plan. The net assets of the Defined Benefit plan, valued at $265.8 million as of September 30, 2017, are invested by the Michigan Department of Treasury, Bureau of Investments. In fiscal year 2017, the System paid Defined Benefit plan retirement pensions totaling $23.7 million.
