= PolicyArchive =

Digital archive of public policy research

PolicyArchive was a digital archive of global, non-partisan public policy research maintained by the Center for Governmental Studies and the Indiana University – Purdue University Indianapolis (IUPUI) University Library. It was transferred to Policy Commons in 2021

The website bundled policy recommendations for President Barack Obama from more than 20 think tanks in November 2008 and also launched its online collection of presidential transition papers called "Presidential Advisory '08" as a resource for the public.
