= The California Channel =

- Country: United States
- Broadcast area: California
- Headquarters: Sacramento, California

Programming
- Language(s): English

History
- Launched: February 4, 1991; 34 years ago
- Closed: October 15, 2019; 5 years ago
- Former names: Cal-SPAN

The California Channel or CalChannel was a public service news television channel funded by the California Cable Television Association.

== History ==
The channel started out by operating every weekday from 9:00am to 3:30pm; broadcasting proceedings of the California Senate, Assembly and their various committees. It now runs twenty four hours a day reaching 5.5 million subscribers across the state. The channel was created by the Center for Governmental Studies together with the Annenberg School of Communications at the University of Southern California and first broadcast on February 4, 1991. In 1993, the California Cable Television Industry assumed responsibility for governance and funding for the channel.

In mid-August 2019, the CCTA announced the network's closure. The organization and network cited the November 2016 passage of Proposition 54, a ballot initiative which required all legislative proceedings to be recorded and made public with posting them on the Internet 72 hours before a vote was tallied, and be accessible for twenty years after a proceeding. As the Senate and Assembly have internal video and radio news services, the CCTA considered The California Channel effectively a duplicative service to those efforts. The legislature has since made efforts to retain the network and its coverage before the network's closure, to keep proceedings public on a televised venue in some form. On October 15, 2019, the channel ceased operations.
