= Campaign finance reform in the United States =

Efforts to regulate election campaign fundraising

Campaign finance reform in the United States has been a contentious political issue since the early days of the Union. The most recent major federal law affecting campaign finance was the Bipartisan Campaign Reform Act (BCRA) of 2002, also known as "McCain–Feingold". Key provisions of the law prohibited unregulated contributions (commonly referred to as "soft money") to national political parties and limited the use of corporate and union money to fund ads discussing political issues within 60 days of a general election or 30 days of a primary election; However, provisions of BCRA limiting corporate and union expenditures for issue advertising were later overturned by the Supreme Court in Federal Election Commission v. Wisconsin Right to Life.

Contributions, donations or payments to politicians or political parties, including a campaign committee, newsletter fund, advertisements in convention bulletins, admission to dinners or programs that benefit a political party or political candidate and a political action committee (PAC), are not tax-deductible from income taxes.

== History ==
=== First attempts ===
To gain votes from recently enfranchised, unpropertied voters, Andrew Jackson launched his campaign for the 1828 election through a network of partisan newspapers across the nation. After his election, Jackson began a political patronage system that rewarded political party operatives, which had a profound effect on future elections. Eventually, appointees were expected to contribute portions of their pay back to the political party. During the Jacksonian era, some of the first attempts were made by corporations to influence politicians. Jackson claimed that his charter battle against the Second Bank of the United States was one of the great struggles between democracy and the money power. While it was rumored that The Bank of the United States spent over $40,000 from 1830 to 1832 in an effort to stop Jackson's re-election, Chairman Biddle of the BUS only spent "tens of thousands to distribute information favorable to the bank." This expenditure can be conceived as being spent "against" Jackson, because of the competing ideals of the Bank and Jackson's anti-bank platform.

After the Civil War, parties increasingly relied on wealthy individuals for support, including Jay Cooke, the Vanderbilts, and the Astors. In the absence of a civil service system, parties also continued to rely heavily on financial support from government employees, including assessments of a portion of their federal pay. The first federal campaign finance law, passed in 1867, was a Naval Appropriations Bill which prohibited officers and government employees from soliciting contributions from Navy yard workers. Later, the Pendleton Civil Service Reform Act of 1883 established the civil service and extended the protections of the Naval Appropriations Bill to all federal civil service workers. However, this loss of a major funding source increased pressure on parties to solicit funding from corporate and individual wealth.

In the campaign of 1872, a group of wealthy New York Democrats pledged $10,000 each to pay for the costs of promoting the election. On the Republican side, one Ulysses S. Grant supporter alone contributed one fourth of the total finances. One historian said that never before was a candidate under such a great obligation to men of wealth. Vote buying and voter coercion were common in this era. After more standardized ballots were introduced, these practices continued, applying methods such as requiring voters to use carbon paper to record their vote publicly in order to be paid.

Boies Penrose mastered post-Pendleton Act corporate funding through extortionist tactics, such as squeeze bills (legislation threatening to tax or regulate business unless funds were contributed.) During his successful 1896 U.S. Senate campaign, he raised a quarter million dollars within 48 hours. He allegedly told supporters that they should send him to Congress to enable them to make even more money.

In 1896, a wealthy Ohio industrialist, shipping magnate and political operative, Mark Hanna became Chairman of the Republican National Committee. Hanna directly contributed $100,000 to the nomination campaign of fellow Ohioan William McKinley, but recognized that more would be needed to fund the general election campaign. Hanna systematized fund-raising from the business community. He assessed banks 0.25% of their capital, and corporations were assessed in relation to their profitability and perceived stake in the prosperity of the country. McKinley's run became the prototype of the modern commercial advertising campaign, putting the President-to-be's image on buttons, billboards, posters, and so on. Business supporters, determined to defeat the Democratic-populist William Jennings Bryan, were more than happy to give, and Hanna actually refunded or turned down what he considered to be "excessive" contributions that exceeded a business's assessment.

Twentieth-century Progressive advocates, together with journalists and political satirists, argued to the general public that the policies of vote buying and excessive corporate and moneyed influence were abandoning the interests of millions of taxpayers. They advocated strong antitrust laws, restricting corporate lobbying and campaign contributions, and greater citizen participation and control, including standardized secret ballots, strict voter registration and women's suffrage.

In his first term, President Theodore Roosevelt, following President McKinley's assassination of 1901, began trust-busting and anti-corporate-influence activities, but fearing defeat, turned to bankers and industrialists for support in what turned out to be his 1904 landslide campaign. Roosevelt was embarrassed by his corporate financing and was unable to clear a suspicion of a quid pro quo exchange with E.H. Harriman for what was an eventually unfulfilled ambassador nomination. There was a resulting national call for reform, but Roosevelt claimed that it was legitimate to accept large contributions if there were no implied obligation. However, in his 1905 message to Congress following the election, he proposed that "contributions by corporations to any political committee or for any political purpose should be forbidden by law." The proposal, however, included no restrictions on campaign contributions from the private individuals who owned and ran corporations. Roosevelt also called for public financing of federal candidates via their political parties. The movement for a national law to require disclosure of campaign expenditures, begun by the National Publicity Law Association, was supported by Roosevelt but delayed by Congress for a decade.

=== Tillman Act of 1907 ===
This first effort at wide-ranging reform was the Tillman Act of 1907 which prohibited corporations and nationally chartered (interstate) banks from making direct monetary contributions to federal candidates. However, weak enforcement mechanisms made the Act ineffective.

Disclosure requirements and spending limits for House and Senate candidates followed in 1910 and 1911. General contribution limits were enacted in the Federal Corrupt Practices Act (1925). An amendment to the Hatch Act of 1939 set an annual ceiling of $3 million for political parties' campaign expenditures and $5,000 for individual campaign contributions. The Smith–Connally Act (1943) and Taft–Hartley Act (1947) extended the corporate ban to labor unions.

=== Federal Elections Campaign Act and the Watergate Amendments ===
All of these efforts were largely ineffective, easily circumvented and rarely enforced. In 1971, however, Congress passed the Federal Election Campaign Act, known as FECA, requiring broad disclosure of campaign finance. In 1974, fueled by public reaction to the Watergate Scandal, Congress passed amendments to the Act establishing a comprehensive system of regulation and enforcement, including public financing of presidential campaigns and creation of a central enforcement agency, the Federal Election Commission. Other provisions included limits on contributions to campaigns and expenditures by campaigns, individuals, corporations and other political groups.

The 1976 decision of the US Supreme Court in Buckley v. Valeo struck down various FECA limits on spending as unconstitutional violations of free speech. Among other changes, this removed limits on candidate expenditures unless the candidate accepts public financing.

=== Reforms of the 1980s and 1990s ===
In 1986, several bills were killed in the U.S. Senate by bipartisan maneuvers which did not allow the bills to come up for a vote. The bill would impose strict controls for campaign fund raising. Later in 1988, legislative and legal setbacks on proposals designed to limit overall campaign spending by candidates were shelved after a Republican filibuster. In addition, a constitutional amendment to override a Supreme Court decision failed to get off the ground.

In 1994, Senate Democrats had more bills blocked by Republicans including a bill setting spending limits and authorizing partial public financing of congressional elections. In 1996, bipartisan legislation for voluntary spending limits which rewards those who bare soft money was killed by a Republican filibuster.

In 1997, Senators McCain (R-AZ) and Feingold (D-WI) sought to eliminate soft money and TV advertising expenditures, but the legislation was defeated by a Republican filibuster. Several different proposals were made in 1999 by both parties. The Campaign Integrity Act (H.R. 1867), proposed by Asa Hutchinson (R-AR), would have banned soft money, which was not yet regulated and could be spent on ads that did not petition for the election or defeat of a specific candidate, and raised limits on hard money. The Citizen Legislature & Political Act sponsored by Rep. John Doolittle (R-CA) would have repealed all federal freedom act contribution limits and expedited and expanded disclosure (H.R. 1922 in 1999, the 106th Congress, and reintroduced with different numbers through 2007, the 110th Congress). The Shays–Meehan Campaign Reform Act (H.R. 417) evolved into the McCain–Feingold Bipartisan Campaign Reform Act of 2002.

=== Political Reform Act (Proposition 9) ===
The Political Reform Act (1974) was enacted in the state of California in 1974, in order to provide greater transparency surrounding political campaign funding. Post watergate, many people were concerned about government corruption and wanted to "put an end to it". The enactment of this law made campaign financing in the state of California under greater public scrutiny and minimizing corruption. This act has six components that aid in improving campaign funding transparency. First, mandatory spending limits were placed on candidates running for state office and ballot measure committees. However, this was ruled unconstitutional by the Buckley v. Valeo (1976) supreme court decision. This court case ruled limiting the expenditures of political campaigns and their committees unconstitutional, except for presidential candidates. This proposition also restricted lobbyists from donating to political campaigns and placed a $10 gift limit. It also established strict conflict of interest laws and requires state and local agency officials who frequently donate to campaigns to publicly disclose personal financial information. Anonymous contributions over $100 were also banned, as well as mandated extensive campaign disclosure information to promote transparency surrounding donors to political campaigns. The Political Reform Act also enacted laws to minimize incumbent advantage, like prohibiting mass mailings as a public expense. However, some of these laws have been altered through court or regulatory action. Finally, the Fair Political Practices Commission (FPPC) was created to ensure the enforcement of these laws, which previously did not happen as there was no regulatory body for campaign finance laws. In addition to the creation of the FPPC, the Franchise Tax Board regularly performs audits on political campaign finance statements. All of these components work together to ensure the transparency of political campaign finances in the state of California.

=== Bipartisan Campaign Reform Act of 2002 ===
The Congress passed the Bipartisan Campaign Reform Act (BCRA), also called the McCain–Feingold bill after its chief sponsors, John McCain and Russ Feingold. The bill was passed by the House of Representatives on February 14, 2002, with 240 yeas and 189 nays, including 6 members who did not vote. Final passage in the Senate came after supporters mustered the bare minimum of 60 votes needed to shut off debate. The bill passed the Senate, 60–40 on March 20, 2002, and was signed into law by President Bush on March 27, 2002. In signing the law, Bush expressed concerns about the constitutionality of parts of the legislation but concluded, "I believe that this legislation, although far from perfect, will improve the current financing system for Federal campaigns." The bill was the first significant overhaul of federal campaign finance laws since the post-Watergate scandal era. Academic research has used game theory to explain Congress's incentives to pass the Act.

The BCRA was a mixed bag for those who wanted to remove big money from politics. It eliminated all soft money donations to the national party committees, but it also doubled the contribution limit of hard money, from $1,000 to $2,000 per election cycle, with a built-in increase for inflation. In addition, the bill aimed to curtail ads by non-party organizations by banning the use of corporate or union money to pay for "electioneering communications", defined as broadcast advertising that identifies a federal candidate within 30 days of a primary or nominating convention, or 60 days of a general election. This provision of McCain–Feingold, sponsored by Maine Republican Olympia Snowe and Vermont Independent James Jeffords, as introduced applied only to for-profit corporations, but was extended to incorporate non-profit issue organizations, such as the Environmental Defense Fund or the National Rifle Association of America (NRA), as part of the "Wellstone Amendment", sponsored by Senator Paul Wellstone.

The law was challenged as unconstitutional by groups and individuals including the California State Democratic Party, the National Rifle Association, and Republican Senator Mitch McConnell (Kentucky), the Senate Majority Whip. After moving through lower courts, in September 2003, the U.S. Supreme Court heard oral arguments in the case, McConnell v. FEC. On Wednesday, December 10, 2003, the Supreme Court issued a 5–4 ruling that upheld its key provisions.

Since then, campaign finance limitations continued to be challenged in the Courts. In 2005 in Washington state, Thurston County Judge Christopher Wickham ruled that media articles and segments were considered in-kind contributions under state law. The heart of the matter focused on the I-912 campaign to repeal a fuel tax, and specifically two broadcasters for Seattle conservative talker KVI. Judge Wickham's ruling was eventually overturned on appeal in April 2007, with the Washington Supreme Court holding that on-air commentary was not covered by the State's campaign finance laws (No New Gas Tax v. San Juan County).

In 2006, the United States Supreme Court issued two decisions on campaign finance. In Federal Election Commission v. Wisconsin Right to Life, Inc., it held that certain advertisements might be constitutionally entitled to an exception from the 'electioneering communications' provisions of McCain-Feingold limiting broadcast ads that merely mention a federal candidate within 60 days of an election. On remand, a lower court then held that certain ads aired by Wisconsin Right to Life in fact merited such an exception. The Federal Election Commission appealed that decision, and in June 2007, the Supreme Court held in favor of Wisconsin Right to Life. In an opinion by Chief Justice John Roberts, the Court declined to overturn the electioneering communications limits in their entirety, but established a broad exemption for any ad that could have a reasonable interpretation as an ad about legislative issues.

Also in 2006, the Supreme Court held that a Vermont law imposing mandatory limits on spending was unconstitutional, under the precedent of Buckley v. Valeo. In that case, Randall v. Sorrell, the Court also struck down Vermont's contribution limits as unconstitutionally low, the first time that the Court had ever struck down a contribution limit.

In March 2009, the U.S. Supreme Court heard arguments about whether or not the law could restrict advertising of a documentary about Hillary Clinton. Citizens United v. Federal Election Commission was decided in January 2010, the Supreme Court finding that §441b's restrictions on expenditures were invalid and could not be applied to Hillary: The Movie.

=== DISCLOSE Act of 2010 ===
The DISCLOSE Act (S. 3628) was proposed in July 2010. The bill would have amended the Federal Election Campaign Act of 1971 to prohibit government contractors from making expenditures with respect to such elections, and establish additional disclosure requirements for election spending. The bill would have imposed new donor and contribution disclosure requirements on nearly all organizations that air political ads independently of candidates or the political parties. The legislation would have required the sponsor of the ad to appear in the ad itself. President Obama argued that the bill would reduce foreign influence over American elections. Democrats needed at least one Republican to support the measure in order to get the 60 votes to overcome GOP procedural delays, but were unsuccessful.

== Current proposals for reform ==
=== Voting with dollars ===
The voting with dollars plan would establish a system of modified public financing coupled with an anonymous campaign contribution process. It was originally described in detail by Yale Law School professors Bruce Ackerman and Ian Ayres in their 2002 book Voting with Dollars: A New Paradigm for Campaign Finance. All voters would be given a $50 publicly funded voucher to donate to federal political campaigns. All donations including both the $50 voucher and additional private contributions, must be made anonymously through the FEC. Ackerman and Ayres include model legislation in their book in addition to detailed discussion as to how such a system could be achieved and its legal basis.

Of the Patriot dollars (i.e. $50 per voter) given to voters to allocate, they propose $25 going to presidential campaigns, $15 to Senate campaigns, and $10 to House campaigns. Within those restrictions the voucher can be split among any number of candidates for any federal race and between the primary and general elections. At the end of the current election cycle any unspent portions of this voucher would expire and could not be rolled over to subsequent elections for that voter. In the context of the 2004 election cycle $50 multiplied by the approximately 120 million people who voted would have yielded about $6 billion in "public financing" compared to the approximate $4 billion spent in 2004 for all federal elections (House, Senate and Presidential races) combined. Ackerman and Ayres argue that this system would pool voter money and force candidates to address issues of importance to a broad spectrum of voters. Additionally they argue this public finance scheme would address taxpayers' concerns that they have "no say" in where public financing monies are spent, whereas in the Voting with dollars system each taxpayer who votes has discretion over their contribution.

Lessig (2011, p. 269) notes that the cost of this is tiny relative to the cost of corporate welfare, estimated at $100 billion in the 2012 US federal budget. However, this considers only direct subsidies identified by the Cato Institute. It ignores tax loopholes and regulatory and trade decisions, encouraging business mergers and other activities that can stifle competition, creativity and economic growth; the direct subsidies can be a tiny fraction of these indirect costs.

The second aspect of the system increases some private donation limits, but all contributions must be made anonymously through the FEC. In this system, when a contributor makes a donation to a campaign, they send their money to the FEC, indicating to which campaign they want it to go. The FEC masks the money and distributes it directly to the campaigns in randomized chunks over a number of days. Ackerman and Ayres compare this system to the reforms adopted in the late 19th century aimed to prevent vote buying, which led to our current secret ballot process. Prior to that time voting was conducted openly, allowing campaigns to confirm that voters cast ballots for the candidates they had been paid to support. Ackerman and Ayres contend that if candidates do not know for sure who is contributing to their campaigns they are unlikely to take unpopular stances to court large donors which could jeopardize donations flowing from voter vouchers. Conversely, large potential donors will not be able to gain political access or favorable legislation in return for their contributions since they cannot prove to candidates the supposed extent of their financial support.

In 2015, Seattle voters approved the Democracy Vouchers Program, which gives city residents four $25 vouchers to donate to participating candidates. Vouchers have been proposed in other cities and states as a means to diversify the donor pool, help more candidates run for office, and boost political engagement.

=== Matching funds ===
Another method allows the candidates to raise funds from private donors, but provides matching funds for the first chunk of donations. For instance, the government might "match" the first $250 of every donation. This would effectively make small donations more valuable to a campaign, potentially leading them to put more effort into pursuing such donations, which are believed to have less of a corrupting effect than larger gifts and enhance the power of less-wealthy individuals. Such a system is currently in place in the U.S. presidential primaries. As of February 2008, there were fears that this system provided a safety net for losers in these races, as shown by a loan taken out by John McCain's campaign that used the promise of matching funds as collateral. However, in February 2009 the Federal Election Commission found no violation of the law because McCain permissibly withdrew from the Matching Payment Program and thus was released from his obligations. It also found no reason to believe that a violation occurred as a result of the committee's reporting of McCain's loan. The Commission closed the files.

=== Empowering Citizens Act (2013) ===
The Empowering Citizens Act (2013) was a legislative bill proposed by Representative David Price (D-NC) and Representative Chris Van Hollen (D-MD) that was modeled after a small donor campaign funding program in New York City. Donations up to $250 from individual donors would be matched and adjusted with inflation at a 5:1 ratio to public funds. This creates a more direct relationship between candidates and their constituents and incentivizes them to reach a more diverse audience of constituents. It was also proposed that candidates would have a contribution limit of $1,250 from individual donors, if they opt into the public campaign financing system. This bill was proposed but was never enacted into law.

=== Clean elections ===
Another method, which supporters call clean money, clean elections, gives each candidate who chooses to participate a certain, set amount of money. In order to qualify for this money, the candidates must collect a specified number of signatures and small (usually $5) contributions. The candidates are not allowed to accept outside donations or to use their own personal money if they receive this public funding. Candidates receive matching funds, up to a limit, when they are outspent by privately funded candidates, attacked by independent expenditures, or their opponent benefits from independent expenditures. This is the primary difference between clean money public financing systems and the presidential campaign system, which many have called "broken" because it provides no extra funds when candidates are attacked by 527s or other independent expenditure groups. Supporters claim that Clean Elections matching funds are so effective at leveling the playing field in Arizona that during the first full year of its implementation, disproportionate funding between candidates was a factor in only 2% of the races. The U.S. Supreme Court's decision in Davis v. Federal Election Commission, however, cast considerable doubt on the constitutionality of these provisions, and in 2011 the Supreme Court held that key provisions of the Arizona law – most notably its matching fund provisions – were unconstitutional in Arizona Free Enterprise Club's Freedom Club PAC v. Bennett.

This procedure has been in place in races for all statewide and legislative offices in Arizona and Maine since 2000. Connecticut passed a Clean Elections law in 2005, along with the cities of Portland, Oregon and Albuquerque, New Mexico, although Portland's was repealed by voter initiative in 2010. Sixty-nine percent of the voters in Albuquerque voted yes to Clean Elections. A 2006 poll showed that 85% of Arizonans familiar with their Clean Elections system thought it was important to Arizona voters. However, a clean elections initiative in California was defeated by a wide margin at the November 2006 election, with just 25.7% in favor, 74.3% opposed, and in 2008 Alaska voters rejected a clean elections proposal by a two to one margin. Many other states (such as New Jersey) have some form of limited financial assistance for candidates, but New Jersey's experiment with Clean Elections was ended in 2008, in part due to a sense that the program failed to accomplish its goals. Wisconsin and Minnesota have had partial public funding since the 1970s, but the systems have largely fallen into disuse.

A clause in the Bipartisan Campaign Reform Act of 2002 ("McCain–Feingold") required the nonpartisan General Accounting Office to conduct a study of clean elections programs in Arizona and Maine. The report, issued in May 2003, found none of the objectives of the systems had yet been attained, but cautioned that because of the relatively short time the programs had been in place, "it is too soon to determine the extent to which the goals of Maine’s and Arizona’s public financing programs are being met... [and] We are not making any recommendations in this report." A 2006 study by the Center for Governmental Studies (an advocate for campaign finance reform) found that Clean Elections programs resulted in more candidates, more competition, more voter participation, and less influence-peddling. In 2008, however, a series of studies conducted by the Center for Competitive Politics (which generally opposes regulation and taxpayer funded political campaigns), found that the programs in Maine, Arizona, and New Jersey had failed to accomplish their stated goals, including electing more women, reducing government spending, reducing special interest influence on elections, bringing more diverse backgrounds into the legislature, or meeting most other stated objectives, including increasing competition or voter participation. These reports confirmed the results of an earlier study by the conservative/libertarian Goldwater Institute on Arizona's program.

=== Constitutional amendments ===
==== OCCUPIED Amendment ====
The Occupy Movement, spreading across the United States and other nations with over 1,500 sites, called for U.S. campaign finance reform eliminating corporate influence on politics and reducing social and economic inequality. In response to the Occupy Wall Street protests, Representative Ted Deutch introduced the "Outlawing Corporate Cash Undermining the Public Interest in our Elections and Democracy" (OCCUPIED) constitutional amendment on November 18, 2011. The OCCUPIED amendment would outlaw the use of for-profit corporation money in U.S. election campaigns and give Congress and states the authority to create a public campaign finance system. Unions and non-profit organizations will still be able to contribute to campaigns. On November 1, 2011, Senator Tom Udall also introduced a constitutional amendment in Congress to reform campaign finance which would allow Congress and state legislatures to establish public campaign finance. Two other constitutional campaign finance reform amendments were introduced in Congress in November 2011.

Harvard law professor and Creative Commons board member Lawrence Lessig called for a constitutional convention in a September 24–25, 2011 conference co-chaired by the Tea Party Patriots' national coordinator. Lessig's initial constitutional amendment would allow legislatures to limit political contributions from non-citizens, including corporations, anonymous organizations, and foreign nationals, and he also supports public campaign financing and electoral college reform to establish the one person, one vote principle. Lessig's web site convention.idea.informer.com allows anyone to propose and vote on constitutional amendments.

==== Saving American Democracy Amendment ====
The Saving American Democracy Amendment is a United States constitutional amendment proposed in December 2011 by Senators Mark Begich (D-Alaska) and Bernie Sanders (I-Vermont) "to expressly exclude for-profit corporations from the rights given to natural persons by the Constitution of the United States, prohibit corporate spending in all elections, and affirm the authority of Congress and the States to regulate corporations and to regulate and set limits on all election contributions and expenditures." The Saving American Democracy Amendment was meant to overturn the 2010 United States Supreme Court decision Citizens United v. Federal Election Commission.

==== Democracy For All Amendment ====
The Democracy For All Amendment was introduced in multiple sessions of Congress beginning with the 113th. It would grant Congress and the States the ability to limit the raising and spending of money in campaigns for public office. It would also grant Congress and the States the ability to distinguish between a natural person and an artificial entity, such as a corporation. The resolution was introduced in the Senate by Senator Tom Udall and in the House by Representative Ted Deutch during both congresses. During the 113th Congress the resolution received 129 co-sponsors in the House (all Democrats), and 48 co-sponsors in the Senate (46 Democrats, 2 Independents). In the Senate, the resolution was never voted on, and in the House, it was sent to the House Subcommittee on the Constitution and Civil Justice.

==== We The People Amendment ====
The We the People Amendment would establish that constitutional rights are reserved for natural persons only, that artificial entities — corporations, limited liability companies, and other incorporated entities established by the laws of any state, the United States, or any foreign state — have no rights under the Constitution and are subject to regulation through federal, state, or local law, and further establishes that privileges of such entities cannot be construed as inherent or inalienable. It would require federal, state, and local governments to regulate, limit, or prohibit political contributions or expenditures, including those made by a candidate, and would require any permissible political contributions and expenditures to be publicly disclosed. It would also prohibit the courts from construing the spending of money to influence elections as a form of protected speech under the First Amendment or from holding that the amendment would abridge the freedom of the press.

=== CFR28 ===
CFR28 is a proposed constitutional amendment designed to deliver campaign finance reform without infringing on free speech. It claims to do this using two primary provisions.

First, CFR28 restricts candidate funding to consist of small citizen contributions and public financing. These citizen contribution limits are set biannually at one percent of the median annual income of all Americans (currently less than $400), so limits adjust with inflation. However, these limited contributions can be supplemented or displaced by Congress or State Legislatures.

Second, to overcome the Citizens United v. FEC decision that equated money spent on political speech with the speech itself (thus giving such spending First Amendment protection), CFR28 specifically targets independent political advertising for elimination. It does this by defining advertising as uninvited media that costs more than the limit mentioned above. This definition still allows unlimited spending on news, commentary and entertainment about candidates, but the audience will only see such media if they choose to after being told who is sponsoring it. All other speech about candidates is unlimited.

CFR28 further claims to prevent foreign influence on American elections because foreign sponsored media will not be able to hide among messaging from domestic super PACs since super PAC advertising will be eliminated.

At almost two pages and the first amendment with subsections, CFR28 is longer than other proposed constitutional amendments on campaign finances as it attempts to eliminate loopholes and provide some implementation provisions.

As a loophole example, CFR28 disallows any funding source not authorized under CFR28 to eliminate all corporate funding and nullifying the Buckley v. Valeo decision, which allows candidates themselves to spend unlimited personal funds on their campaigns. And by preventing donors from giving to candidates outside their voting district or state (except for the President), it also voids the decision in McCutcheon v. FEC which allowed citizens to contribute to an unlimited number of candidates around the country.

CFR28's implementing provisions include preventing subsidies and interference in citizen choices to help candidates, and allows unlimited volunteering for candidates. It also has reporting requirements and mandates that Congress enact relevant laws "to ensure manifold commitment to the integrity of American democracy" in order to compel networks and social media to cooperate.

In addition to providing the text of the proposed constitutional amendment, the CFR28.org web site explains it line-by-line both in writing and through several videos. It also includes a blog on related topics.

=== Redefining Quid Pro Quo ===
A different approach would allow private contributions as they currently are; however it would severely penalize those who gain substantive, material favors in exchange for their contributions and those who grant such favors in exchange for receiving contributions. Thus new limitations would not be imposed on what one can give—but rather on what one can get in return. (Needless to say, if such additional limitations could be introduced, many of the special interests would contribute much less than they currently do, and the effects of the remaining contributions would be much less corrupting). Currently quid pro quo is considered a bribery only if the person who provided material incentives to a public official explicitly tied those on receiving a specific favor in return.

=== Maine Question One (2024) ===
Maine Question 1, also known as the Limit Contributions to Super PACs Initiative, was a citizen-initiated referendum on the November 5, 2024 ballot that sought to limit contributions to super PACs to $5,000. The measure passed overwhelmingly with 74.9% voter approval, carrying every municipality in Maine except two.

The initiative was designed to challenge the legal framework established by SpeechNow.org v. FEC (2010), a D.C. Circuit Court decision that declared limits on contributions to PACs unconstitutional, but which has never been reviewed by the Supreme Court.

Following the initiative’s passage, two super PACs sued to block enforcement of the law, citing SpeechNow. In July 2025, a federal judge ruled in their favor. The case, Dinner Table Action v. Schneider, is now on appeal to the First Circuit Court of Appeals, with the Maine Attorney General and the advocacy organization Equal Citizens defending the law. The case is on track to reach the Supreme Court, providing an opportunity for theCourt to rule definitively on whether contribution limits are constitutional. Should the court overturn SpeechNow, Maine’s contribution limits would take effect, and existing state and federal limits on PAC contributions would be revived.

== Citizens United v. Federal Election Commission ==
In Citizens United v. Federal Election Commission, in January 2010, the US Supreme Court ruled that corporations and unions can not constitutionally be prohibited from promoting the election of one candidate over another candidate.

=== Ruling ===
Justice Kennedy's majority opinion found that the BCRA §203 prohibition of all independent expenditures by corporations and unions violated the First Amendment's protection of free speech. The majority wrote, "If the First Amendment has any force, it prohibits Congress from fining or jailing citizens, or associations of citizens, for simply engaging in political speech."

Justice Kennedy's opinion for the majority also noted that since the First Amendment (and the Court) do not distinguish between media and other corporations, these restrictions would allow Congress to suppress political speech in newspapers, books, television and blogs. The Court overruled Austin v. Michigan Chamber of Commerce, 494 U.S. 652 (1990), which had held that a state law that prohibited corporations from using treasury money to support or oppose candidates in elections did not violate the First and Fourteenth Amendments. The Court also overruled that portion of McConnell v. Federal Election Commission, 540 U.S. 93 (2003), that upheld BCRA's restriction of corporate spending on "electioneering communications". The Court's ruling effectively freed corporations and unions to spend money both on "electioneering communications" and to directly advocate for the election or defeat of candidates (although not to contribute directly to candidates or political parties).

The majority argued that the First Amendment protects associations of individuals as well as individual speakers, and further that the First Amendment does not allow prohibitions of speech based on the identity of the speaker. Corporations, as associations of individuals, therefore have speech rights under the First Amendment.

=== Dissent ===
Justice Stevens, J. wrote, in partial dissent:

The basic premise underlying the Court’s ruling is its iteration, and constant reiteration, of the proposition that the First Amendment bars regulatory distinctions based on a speaker’s identity, including its "identity" as a corporation. While that glittering generality has rhetorical appeal, it is not a correct statement of the law. Nor does it tell us when a corporation may engage in electioneering that some of its shareholders oppose. It does not even resolve the specific question whether Citizens United may be required to finance some of its messages with the money in its PAC. The conceit that corporations must be treated identically to natural persons in the political sphere is not only inaccurate but also inadequate to justify the Court’s disposition of this case. In the context of election to public office, the distinction between corporate and human speakers is significant. Although they make enormous contributions to our society, corporations are not actually members of it. They cannot vote or run for office. Because they may be managed and controlled by nonresidents, their interests may conflict in fundamental respects with the interests of eligible voters. The financial resources, legal structure, and instrumental orientation of corporations raise legitimate concerns about their role in the electoral process. Our lawmakers have a compelling constitutional basis, if not also a democratic duty, to take measures designed to guard against the potentially deleterious effects of corporate spending in local and national races.

Justice Stevens also wrote: "The Court’s ruling threatens to undermine the integrity of elected institutions across the Nation. The path it has taken to reach its outcome will, I fear, do damage to this institution. Before turning to the question whether to overrule Austin and part of McConnell, it is important to explain why the Court should not be deciding that question."

=== Impact on spending ===
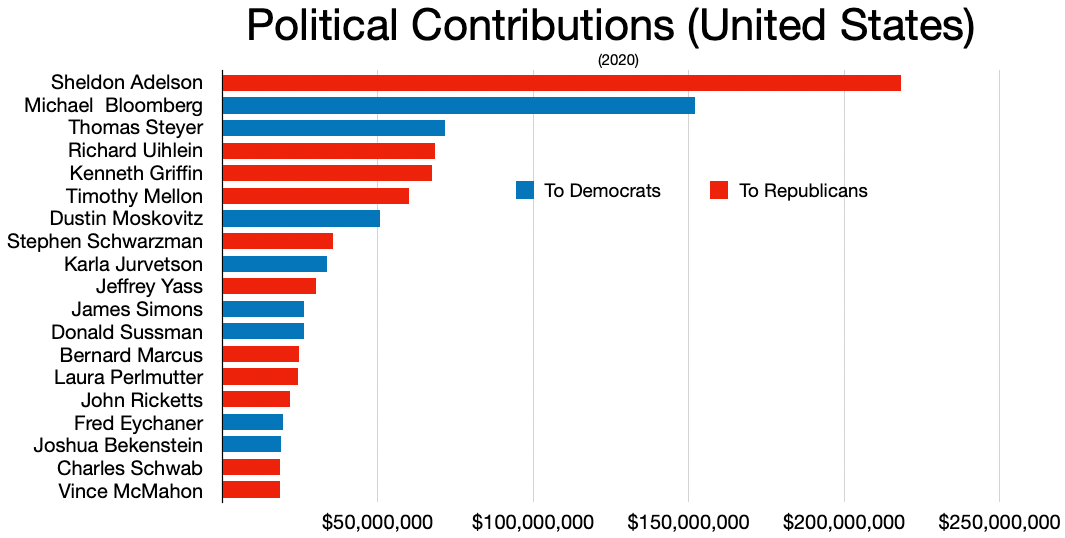
Political donations by wealthy individuals

Political donations from the growing number of billionaires and their immediate families has increased dramatically since 2004, with Republicans receiving a sharp increase in 2024 compared to Democrats.

The effects of the ruling can be seen in the amount of spending and money raised after this decision. The largest donation from an organization before this ruling was over $14 million just in 2008 with the average around $9 million from 2000 to 2010. Starting in election year 2012, the amount of donations began to increase every election year with the largest donation in 2020 being $167 million from a single organization.

=== Public response ===
Senator McCain, one of the two original sponsors of campaign finance reform, noted after the decisions that "campaign finance reform is dead" – but predicted a voter backlash once it became obvious how much money corporations and unions now could and would pour into campaigns.

In a Washington Post-ABC News poll in early February 2010 it was found that roughly 80% of Americans were opposed to the January 2010 Supreme court's ruling. The poll reveals relatively little difference of opinion on the issue among Democrats (85 percent opposed to the ruling), Republicans (76 percent) and independents (81 percent). In response to the ruling, a grassroots, bipartisan group called Move to Amend was created to garner support for a constitutional amendment overturning corporate personhood and declaring that money is not speech.

== McCutcheon et al. v. Federal Election Commission ==
On April 2, 2014, the Supreme Court issued a 5–4 ruling that the 1971 FECA's aggregate limits restricting how much money a donor may contribute in total to all candidates or committees violated the First Amendment. The controlling opinion was written by Chief Justice Roberts, and joined by Justices Scalia, Alito and Kennedy; Justice Thomas concurred in the judgment but wrote separately to argue that all limits on contributions were unconstitutional. Justice Breyer filed a dissenting opinion, joined by Justices Ginsburg, Kagan and Sotomayor.

== See also ==
- Campaign finance in the United States
- Democracy Matters
- Electoral reform in the United States
- Money loop
- Pacific scandal
- Publicly funded elections
