= NY-SCAN =

NY-SCAN (New York State Community Access (or Affairs) Network) was a Public, educational, and government access (PEG) cable television channel in Albany, New York. It ran for at least seven years until 1992, when it was shut down by governor Mario Cuomo and the legislature after broadcasting a controversial speech by City College professor Leonard Jeffries.

It was seen by millions of New Yorkers, providing coverage of gubernatorial inaugurations, debates, primary and election night coverage, back-to-school tips, Christmas shows, and a message from Mario Cuomo, Governor of New York.
