= Michigan Government Television =

- Country: United States
- Broadcast area: Michigan
- Headquarters: Lansing, Michigan

Programming
- Language: English
- Picture format: 480i

History
- Launched: July 15, 1996; 30 years ago
- Closed: January 2013; 13 years ago
- Replaced by: MiTV

Michigan Government Television (MGTV) was a public affairs Government-access television (GATV) cable TV channel. Modeled on C-SPAN, its programming covered events and proceedings within the state government, including sessions of the Michigan House of Representatives and the Michigan Senate.

MGTV was operated by a non-profit corporation funded by cable subscription fees. The channel was on the air five days a week from 10 a.m. to 2 p.m. in 2008. Because of the limited schedule and limited channel pre-digital TV era, MGTV usually shared time with PEG, Leased access or infomercial channels.

== History ==
The Michigan Cable Telecommunications Association commissioned from Public Sector Consultants a study on the feasibility of a state C-SPAN styled cable channel in 1993. The Michigan Public Service Commission and Ameritech settled an overcharging lawsuit. Governor John Engler already had his plan for such a network in motion by earmarking the overcharged settlement funds for the project. A master control room was designed and placed in the Romney office building with additional control rooms and cameras for the two capitol chambers. The cable association assisted with professional advice.

By March 1994, the Michigan House Oversight and Ethics Committee was holding meetings over the Michigan Public Service Commission plans to use $2 million in overcharged fees for the Michigan Government Television project and on February 28, 1994, Lark Samouelian started work as the appointed MGTV project manager. Engler had original plan to run the channel as a part of the executive branch, but was getting resistance.

With Engler just wishing to get the channel off the ground, the Michigan Cable Telecommunications Association offered to place the channel under non-profit 501(c)3 corporation controlled by the cable companies' executives. In December 1995, the cable companies' non-profit took over the channel. Bill Trevarthen was hired as executive director in February 1996 with his start date of April 1, 1996.

MGTV was launched on July 15, 1996. Programming included House and Senate committees, board meetings from within the executive branch, press conferences, speeches by policy makers and events made available by the state’s universities. In October 1996, MGTV made Michigan only the second state to air oral arguments from the state's Supreme Court. For the first year, the channel was only available three Lansing area cable providers, TCI, Media One and Horizon. Satellite uplink was provisioned from Videocom after considering Michigan Information Technology Network's Ku band uplink, which had rain fade. The uplink allowed the channel to go statewide. Live coverage of the Senate began in late 1997 followed soon by the House of Representatives.

For the 1998 election, the channel taped Lansing State Journal editorial board interviews with all statewide candidates and ballot issue advocates. This began a long term relationship with the newspaper. MGTV broadcast additional hours for the Senate expulsion hearing for Senator David Jaye in 2001.

In mid-January 2013 MGTV discontinued operations claiming lack of interest and clearance issues with providers. The non-profit turned over equipment to the Michigan Department of Technology, Management and Budget, which would use the equipment to launch on the internet as MiTV January 1, 2013, and had no cable system restrictions on availability.

== Production ==
While coverage of the public bodies were gavel-to-gavel and unedited, similar to C-SPAN, MGTV did produce some educational documentary programs. Two notable documentaries were about the Civil War flags at the Capitol and their human stories and the other on the World War II Japanese-Americans internment lawsuit focusing on the part of Michigan native and U.S. Supreme Court Justice Frank Murphy. The network also broadcast the oral histories and programs of the Michigan Political History Society.

The channel also recorded the Lansing State Journal's editorial board interviews with all statewide candidates and ballot issue advocates starting in 1998. The channel also held live call-in Q&A sessions with statewide candidates.
