= Oxford Township, Michigan =

- Charter township
- Charter Township of Oxford
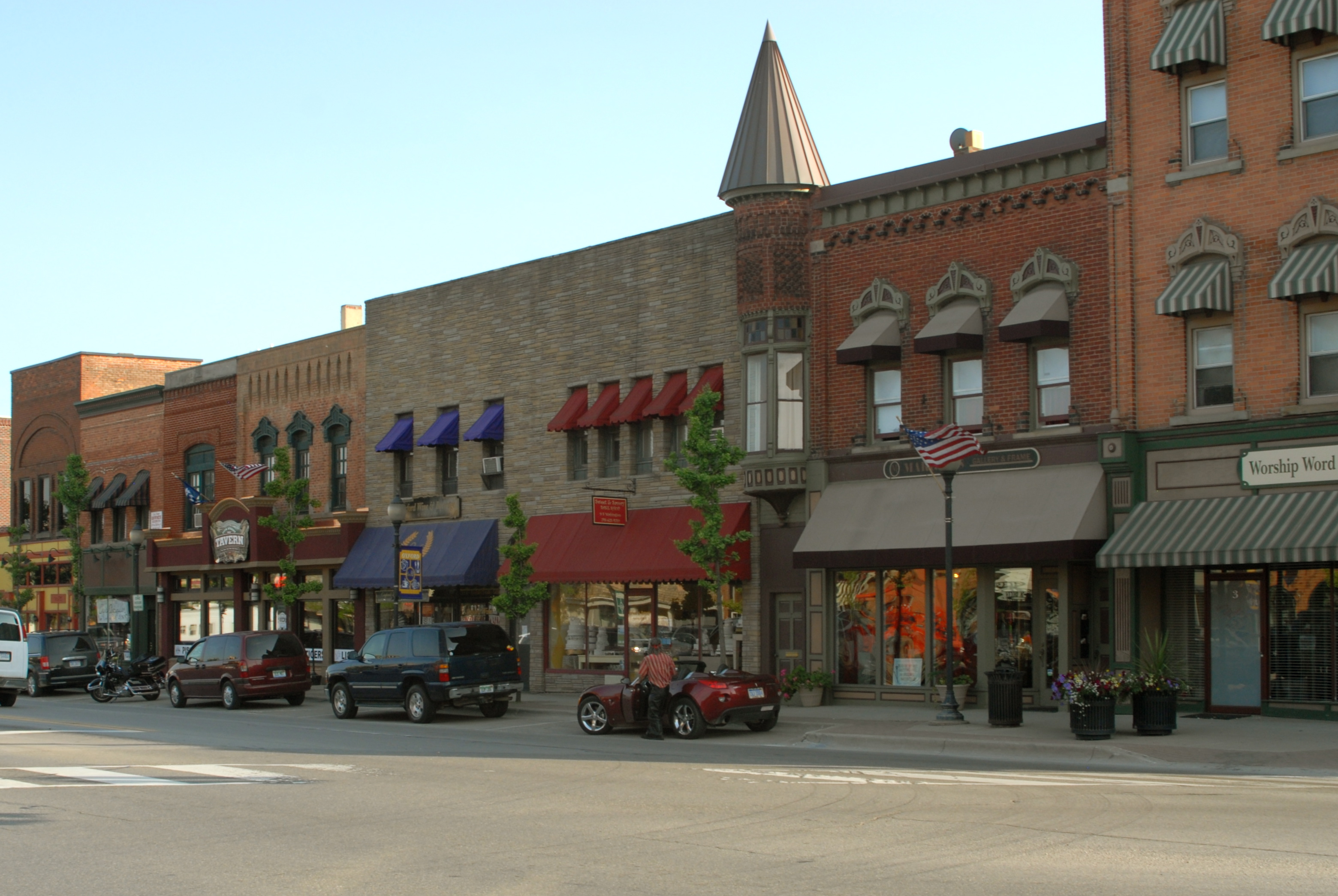
- Village of Oxford within Oxford Township

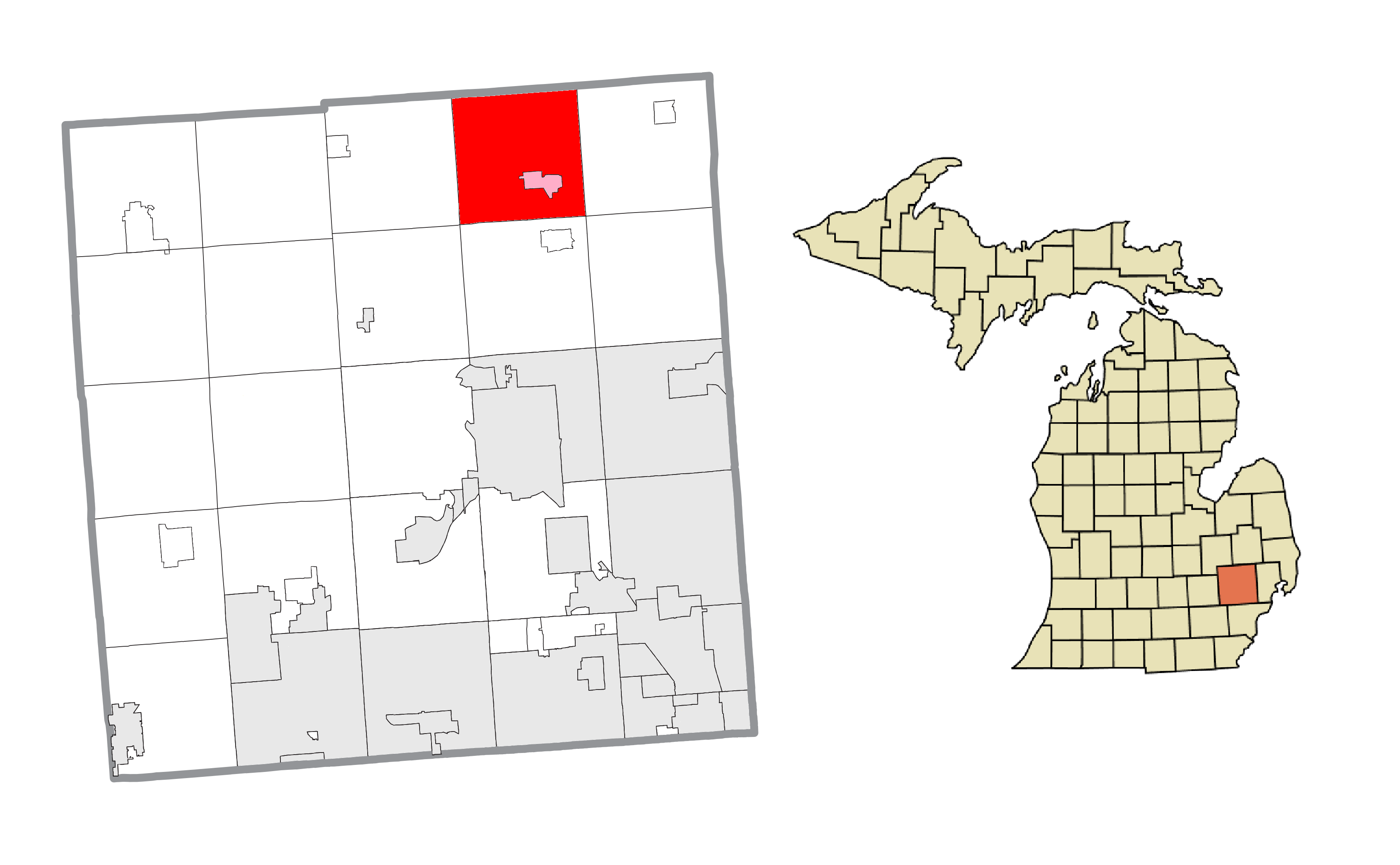
- Location within Oakland County (red) and the administered village of Oxford (pink)

- Location within the state of Michigan
- Coordinates: 42°49′25″N 83°16′14″W
- Country: United States
- State: Michigan
- County: Oakland
- Established: 1837

Government
  - Supervisor: Jack Curtis

Area
  - Charter township: 35.2 sq mi (91.2 km^{2})
  - Land: 33.9 sq mi (87.8 km^{2})
  - Water: 1.3 sq mi (3.4 km^{2})
- Elevation: 1,037 ft (316 m)

Population (2020)
  - Charter township: 22,419
  - Density: 661/sq mi (255/km^{2})
  - Metro: 4,296,250 (Metro Detroit)
- Time zone: UTC-5 (Eastern (EST))
  - Summer (DST): UTC-4 (EDT)
- ZIP code(s): 48371
- Area codes: 248 and 810
- FIPS code: 26-62040
- GNIS feature ID: 1626877
- Website: Official website

Oxford Township, officially the Charter Township of Oxford, is a charter township in Oakland County in the U.S. state of Michigan. The population was 22,419 at the 2020 census.

== Communities ==
- The village of Oxford is located within the township. Like all villages in Michigan, it is geographically and politically part of the township, and residents pay both village and township taxes.

The Township has three unincorporated communities:

- Oakwood straddles the western border with Brandon Township at Baldwin and Oakwood Roads (42°52′03″N 83°20′12″W Elevation: 1099 ft./335 m.).
- Thomas is located at the north end of the Township at M-24 and Thomas Road (42°52′46″N 83°17′50″W Elevation: 1086 ft./331 m.). A railroad station and facilities were necessary near the northern edge of the township, and so the second community, Thomas, was developed. The place was platted by John Thomas in 1871.
- Waterstone is located on Granger Road/Market Street between Dunlap and M-24 (42°50′11″N 83°17′06″W Elevation: 1040 ft./317 M).

== History ==
Prior to the 1820s, what is now Oxford Township was known to be a hunting ground of the Nepessing Tribe of the Chippewa Indians, who inhabited large areas of what became Oakland, Lapeer, and St. Clair counties. Between 1810 and the early 1820s, numerous settlers visited the Oxford area, primarily to hunt and trap. The first documented sale of public land in this area was recorded in 1823 to Elbridge Deming, who later built a log cabin on land in section 9 (in the area of M-24 and Metamora Road) of the township, around the spring of 1832.

Oxford Township was not officially created until after Michigan became a state in 1837. It was originally part of Oakland Township, as were Addison Township and Orion Township; Oxford Township was split away and separately organized in 1837. The 1830s saw an influx of settlers to the area, originally known as Demingsburgh, Demings Corners, and Oxford Corners, before becoming known as Oxford in 1836. The family names of many early settlers to the area are evident today in names of streets and buildings, such as Powell, Hovey, Burdick, and Axford.

New residents continued the trek to Oxford Township, many settling in sections 22 and 27 of what was to become the village of Oxford in 1876. Along with residents came commerce and industry. A downtown area was built in the village, but much of the area south of Burdick Street and west of Washington Street burned to the ground in 1878. When rebuilt, most of the buildings were of brick and masonry construction and are still in use today. The 1850s, 1860s, and 1870s found Oxford a prospering commercial center, with such businesses as Oxford Carriage Factory, Oxford Machine Works, Oxford Valley Mills, Oxford Brewery and several furniture and cabinetry shops.

In addition to the village of Oxford, two other smaller communities developed in other areas of the township. The first developed near Baldwin and Oakwood roads, on the boundary with Brandon Township; the community of Oakwood reached a population of nearly 200 people by 1876 with a foundry and "the usual shops and stores".

A railroad station and facilities were necessary near the northern edge of the township, and so the second community, Thomas, was developed. The place was platted by John Thomas in 1871. Thomas had a store, hotel, grain elevator and gristmill by the late 1870s.

Thomas and Oakwood continued to prosper until May 1896, when they were largely devastated by a monster tornado which traveled across the entire north end of Oakland County. The tornado killed 41 people and injured 46 others in northern Oakland and southern Lapeer counties. Seventeen of the fatalities were in the northern portion of Oxford Township, from the Oakwood village area to Thomas. While many of the homes in Oakwood and Thomas were rebuilt, the two communities were never again centers of commerce. Railroads were largely responsible for change and continued growth in the Oxford area. No longer isolated from Detroit, and now joined with communities to the north, Oxford's commerce thrived. In addition to its businesses and factories, agriculture was a mainstay for the community. At one time in the 1880s, Oxford earned the nickname, Bagatown, from the large number of rutabagas shipped out by train.

The early 1880s saw a second railroad constructed from the Pontiac area, through Oxford to Port Austin. Known as the Pontiac, Oxford, and Port Austin Railroad, the "P.O. and P.A.", it later became the Pontiac, Oxford, and Northern (the "P.O. and N."), and finally the Grand Trunk Western Railroad. With the expansion of the second rail line through town, it now became possible to travel to the tip of Michigan's thumb in one day. By 1900, a third, all electric powered passenger rail line known as the Detroit United Railway (D.U.R.) was extended through Oxford from Detroit to Flint and was noted for maintaining limited cars daily, both north and southbound. Over the years, the D.U.R. was involved in many collisions with automobiles, often resulting in death or injury to those whose automobiles tangled with the interurban cars at grade crossings. As automobile transportation became more reliable and roads improved, a growing percentage of the populace chose to travel by these means, forcing the demise of the D.U.R. in 1931.

On November 30, 2021, a mass shooting occurred at Oxford High School. Four students were killed, and eight other people were injured. The suspected shooter is a 15-year-old sophomore student who was taken into custody. His parents were charged on December 3 with involuntary manslaughter for failing to secure the handgun used in the shooting.

== Geography ==
According to the United States Census Bureau, the township has a total area of 35.2 square miles (91 km^{2}), of which 33.9 square miles (88 km^{2}) is land and 1.3 square miles (3.4 km^{2}), or 3.78%, is water.

== Demographics ==
As of the census of 2000, there were 16,025 people, 5,787 households, and 4,317 families residing in the township. The population density was 472.9 inhabitants per square mile (182.6/km^{2}). There were 6,151 housing units at an average density of 181.5 per square mile (70.1/km^{2}). The racial makeup of the township was 96.83% White, 0.45% African American, 0.26% Native American, 0.51% Asian, 0.02% Pacific Islander, 0.62% from other races, and 1.31% from two or more races. Hispanic or Latino of any race were 2.19% of the population.

There were 5,787 households, out of which 40.6% had children under the age of 18 living with them, 62.7% were married couples living together, 8.8% had a female householder with no husband present, and 25.4% were non-families. 20.7% of all households were made up of individuals, and 6.3% had someone living alone who was 65 years of age or older. The average household size was 2.75 and the average family size was 3.21.

In the township the population was spread out, with 29.2% under the age of 18, 6.9% from 18 to 24, 35.0% from 25 to 44, 21.5% from 45 to 64, and 7.3% who were 65 years of age or older. The median age was 34 years. For every 100 females, there were 97.3 males. For every 100 females age 18 and over, there were 93.9 males.

The median income for a household in the township was $63,494, and the median income for a family was $75,216. Males had a median income of $52,083 versus $32,258 for females. The per capita income for the township was $26,601. About 2.1% of families and 4.3% of the population were below the poverty line, including 3.9% of those under age 18 and 7.6% of those age 65 and over.

== Notable people ==
One of the most recognizable voices throughout the nation in the 1940s and 1950s was that of Brace Beemer, the radio voice of the Lone Ranger. Beemer lived in Oxford Township on a 300-acre ranch on Drahner Road. There is a street named for him in the southwest part of the township, where he lived. His collection of Lone Ranger items is on display in the Northeast Oakland Historical Museum in Oxford.

- Jim Bates (1964), NFL coach, from University of Tennessee, longtime NFL defensive coach (Packers, Broncos, Dolphins and Bucs) as well as Miami's head coach for eight games in 2004
- Brace Beemer, actor who played the Lone Ranger on radio from 1941 to 1953, retired and raised thoroughbred horses on his 300-acre ranch Paint Creek Acres, until his death in 1965
- Albert J. Campbell, United States Representative from Montana, lived in Oxford
- George H. Durand, U.S. Representative, lived in Oxford
- Chris Gambol, NFL player, (University of Iowa/Indianapolis Colts)
- Nathan Gerbe, former NHL player born in Oxford
- Eric Ghiaciuc, NFL player for the New England Patriots, was born in Oxford on May 28, 1981
- Ralph Gilles, an automotive designer currently serving as Head of Design for Fiat Chrysler Automobiles
- Mike Lantry, NFL player, (University of Michigan/Dallas Cowboys)
- Zach Line, NFL player, played for Southern Methodist University, retired from New Orleans Saints roster as a fullback, currently head coach of Oxford football varsity team
- Josh Norris, NHL player was born in Oxford and currently plays for the Buffalo Sabres of the National Hockey League
- Dave Rayner, NFL player, (Michigan State University/Indianapolis Colts)
- William R. Reed, commissioner of the Big Ten Conference from 1961 to 1971, was born in Oxford
- Josh Schriver, Republican in the House of Representatives trying to overturn the Obergfell v. Hodges Supreme Court decision which would make same sex marriage illegal
- Ava Swiss, singer-songwriter and musician who was a semi-finalist on America's Got Talent
- Trey Townsend, professional basketball player

== Education ==
Most of Oxford Township is in Oxford Community Schools, while a section to the south is zoned to Lake Orion Community Schools. The former's zoned high school is Oxford High School while the latter's high school is Lake Orion High School.
