= Polly Ann Trail =

20 mile rail trail in Michigan, US

- Length: 20 miles
- Location: Oakland County and Lapeer County, Michigan
- Use: Hiking, bicycling, roller blading, and cross country skiing, horseback riding
- Surface: Asphalt, gravel, dirt

The Polly Ann Trail is a 20-mile-long rail trail in Oakland County and Lapeer County, Michigan. It follows a portion of the route of the former Pontiac, Oxford and Northern Railroad. The trail is owned by the Michigan Department of Natural Resources and managed by local governments and the Polly Ann Trail Management Council in Oakland County and Friends of the Polly Ann Trail in Lapeer County.

== Route ==
From south to north, the trail is within the following communities: Orion Township, Oxford Township/Oxford, Addison Township/Leonard, Dryden Township/Dryden, Attica Township, Imlay Township/Imlay City, and Arcadia Township. The Oakland County portion of the trail has a crushed stone surface, while the Lapeer County portion is rough stone ballast. North of Imlay City, the trail is unimproved dirt and grass.

Elevation of the trail peaks at 1084 ft. near the gravel pits east of Oxford, and it is generally downhill north to Imlay City, where the nadir is about 819 feet where the trail crosses the North Branch of the Belle River.

== History ==
The first train to use the railroad travelled from Pontiac to Caseville on October 8, 1883. The railroad was not profitable, and gained a reputation for poor passenger service. Grand Trunk Western Railroad began operating the line in 1909.

The railroad was referred to by the nicknames "Polly Ann," "Poor Old Polly Ann" and "Poor, Old and Neglected" after the railroad's initials P.O. and N., as early as 1908. Unrelatedly, in 1913, the popular novel Pollyanna was released, and the term Pollyanna came to be known as an illogically optimistic person. This reinforced the idea that passengers using the line were taking a risk. Passenger service ended in 1955. The last freight train to use the whole route ran in 1984, and the line was abandoned.

The Department of Natural Resources bought the line in 1993. In 2001, the Oxford section was paved. The bridge over M-24 in downtown Oxford opened in October 2006, creating a safer crossing.
