= Pettypiece =

Pettypiece is a surname. Notable people with the surname include:

- Henry John Pettypiece (1855–1942), Canadian journalist, businessman, and politician
- Shannon Pettypiece (born 1981), American journalist
