= Hit Parader's No Cover =

- No Cover
- Genre: Reality competition
- Country of origin: United States
- No. of seasons: 1
- No. of episodes: 11

Production
- Production locations: Hollywood, California.
- Production companies: Hit Parader, LLC

Original release
- Release: 20 April 2022

Hit Parader's No Cover is a music competition television show produced by Hit Parader. Unlike other music competitions, contestants must perform their own original compositions. The first season aired in April 2022 on Sumerian Records YouTube channel. The competition had Alice Cooper, Lzzy Hale, Gavin Rossdale, Tosin Abasi and Bishop Briggs as judges.

The series was created by Ash Avildsen and Josh Bernstein. The first season was filmed at the Troubadour and Sunset Marquis Hotel in West Hollywood.

== History ==
=== Season One ===
The first episode of season one aired in April 20, 2022. The last episode aired on June 29, 2022. It had 11 episodes. The winner of the season was The Native Howl.

The first season prize included a six-figure recording contract with Sumerian Records, booking agency representation from UTA, management from the Shelter Music Group, festival slot(s) via Danny Wimmer Presents, studio time at Nightbird Recording Studios, new gear from Gibson, brand endorsements, licensing opportunities and more.

The season was hosted by Kellin Quinn, Caity Babs from SiriusXM and Matt Pinfield. The first season was self-distributed and can be accessed for free.

=== Season Two ===
Submissions for season two opened while the first season was airing. The second season is expected to be on a music streaming platform.
