= Chris Gambol =

American football player (born 1964)

No. 74, 70
- Positions: Guard, tackle

Personal information
- Born: September 14, 1964 (age 62); Pittsburgh, Pennsylvania, U.S.
- Listed height: 6 ft 6 in (1.98 m)
- Listed weight: 290 lb (132 kg)

Career information
- High school: Oxford (Oxford, Michigan)
- College: Iowa
- NFL draft: 1987: 3rd round, 58th overall pick

Career history
- Indianapolis Colts (1987–1988); San Diego Chargers (1988); Detroit Lions (1989); New England Patriots (1990)

Career NFL statistics
- Games played: 34
- Games started: 15
- Stats at Pro Football Reference

Christopher Hughes Gambol (born September 14, 1964) is an American former professional football player who was an offensive lineman for three seasons in the National Football League (NFL) with the Indianapolis Colts, San Diego Chargers, Detroit Lions and New England Patriots. He was selected by the Colts in the third round of the 1987 NFL draft after playing college football for the Iowa Hawkeyes.

== Early life ==
Christopher Hughes Gambol was born on September 14, 1964, in Pittsburgh, Pennsylvania. He attended Oxford High School in Oxford, Michigan, and played defensive end on the football team. He also participated in track and field in high school, garnering all-state recognition in the shot put and setting the school record with a throw of 157’4” in the discus. Gambol graduated from Oxford in 1982. He was a charter member of the Oxford High School Athletic Hall of Fame in 2010.

== College career ==
Gambol was a member of the Hawkeyes at the University of Iowa from 1983 to 1986 and a two-year letterman from 1985 to 1986. He was originally recruited to Iowa as a tight end after being noticed by head coach Hayden Fry at an Iowa Hawkeye summer camp in 1982, but eventually switched to offensive line. Gambol was also a four-year letterman for the track team, participating in the shot put and discus, and was the Big Ten Conference shot put champion during the 1987 outdoor track season. He graduated from Iowa with a Bachelor of Business Administration in finance in 1986 and a Master of Business Administration in 1991.

== Professional career ==
Pre-draft measurables
Height	Weight	Arm length	Hand span	40-yard dash	10-yard split	20-yard split	20-yard shuttle	Vertical jump	Broad jump	Bench press
6 ft 6 1/2 in (1.99 m)	291 lb (132 kg)	33 1/2 in (0.85 m)	10 1/2 in (0.27 m)	5.20 s	1.80 s	3.03 s	4.69 s	27.0 in (0.69 m)	9 ft 2 in (2.79 m)	21 reps
All values from NFL Combine

Gambol was selected by the Indianapolis Colts in the third round, with the 58th overall pick, of the 1987 NFL draft. He officially signed with the team on July 23. He was placed on injured reserve on September 7, 1987, and spent the entire season there. The next year, Gambol played in one game for the Colts during the 1988 NFL season before being waived on September 22, 1988.

Gambol was claimed off waivers by the San Diego Chargers on September 23, 1988. He played in 11 games for the Chargers in 1988 and became a free agent after the season.

Gambol signed with the Detroit Lions on March 22, 1989. He was released on September 5 but later re-signed on November 15, 1989. He appeared in six games during the 1989 season and became a free agent in February 1990.

He was signed by the New England Patriots on April 1, 1990. He played in all 16 games, starting 15, for the Patriots in 1990 and became a free agent after the season.
