= The Native Howl =

American band

- Origin: Leonard, Michigan, U.S.
- Genres: Bluegrass; alternative rock; thrash metal
- Years active: 2013–present
- Labels: Clean as Dirt Records; Sumerian
- Members: Alex Holycross; Zach Bolling; Mark Chandler; Jacob Sawicki
- Past members: David Robinson; Joshua LeMieux
- Website: thenativehowl.com

The Native Howl is a band from Leonard, Michigan. Their music is a blend of bluegrass and thrash metal, using guitar, banjo, electric bass and drums.

== History ==
Alex Holycross (guitar, bouzouki, vocals) had been briefly producing Jake Sawicki's (guitar, banjo, harmonica) solo project at C.A.D. Studios until they decided to join forces as The Native Howl in 2013. "The Revolution's Dead" was recorded and released, and the duo started performing live and incubating the music that would soon form their 2015 release "Inukshuk".

Soon after, long-time friend and C.A.D. Studios ally David Robinson joined on bass guitar, followed by Clean as Dirt drummer Josh Lemieux. The quartet performed in cities all over the Midwest.

In September 2015, upon David Robinson's friendly departure from the group, Mark Chandler (formerly a metal and classical guitarist) was asked to step in on bass guitar. Chandler had studied classical music at Oakland University with Holycross, and had been playing shows in his band Ancient Chaos with Clean as Dirt (Holycross and Lemieux).

In November 2019, Joshua Lemieux left the group on good terms and the band's longtime friend Zach Bolling (also in Chandler's group Ancient Chaos) stepped in as the permanent drummer.

In March 2016, "Thrash Grass" was released, redefining the band's live image and musical intensity. The Howl continued to hone their performance abilities and compositional aptitude.

In October 2017, the band embarked on their first U.S. tour. The Spring of 2018 saw a long West Coast tour, followed by two additional U.S. tours in the Summer of 2018 that covered most of the mainland U.S.. The much anticipated third full length album, "Out of the Garden and Into the Darkness" released on July 27, 2018. It debuted at number three on the Bluegrass Billboard Chart and number 50 on the New Artist Album Billboard Chart.

In June 2022, The Native Howl won season 1 of Hit Parader's No Cover for a contract with Sumerian Records, beating out the runner up Night Spins.

On August 17, 2022, the band released their first single with Sumerian Records, titled "Sons of Destruction."

== Discography ==
Title	Formats	Details	Peak chart positions
Title	Formats	Details	US Bluegrass
The Revolutions Dead	Compact Disc, Digital Download	Release date: October 11, 2013; Label: Clean as Dirt Records	–
Inukshuk	Compact Disc, Digital Download	Release date: March 17, 2015; Label: Clean as Dirt Records	–
Thrash Grass	Compact Disc, Digital Download, Vinyl Record	Release date: March 11, 2016; Label: Clean as Dirt Records	4
Out of the Garden and Into the Darkness	Compact Disc, Digital Download, Vinyl Record	Release date: July 27, 2018; Label: Clean as Dirt Records	3

== Awards and nominations ==
- The Native Howl's flagship album, Thrash Grass, peaked at number four on the US Billboard Bluegrass chart January 21, 2017.
- Thrash Grass was followed up with a dual disk album, Out of the Garden and Into the Darkness, peaking at number three on US Billboard Bluegrass chart August 11, 2018.
- Nomination to the 2017 Detroit Music Awards
- Blue Water Music Awards Album of the Year and Best Import 2017

== See also ==
- Folk music
- Bluegrass music
