= Stadium Drive Elementary School of the Arts =

School in Michigan, United States

Coordinates: 42.75454°N 83.24141°W

Stadium Drive Elementary School of the Arts is an elementary school located in Orion Township, Michigan, USA. It is a nationally recognized Blue Ribbon School, awarded for the 2000-2001 school year. One of seven elementary schools in the Lake Orion Community Schools, Stadium Drive was built in 1972 - around the time when many schools were built in the district - and houses Kindergarten through fifth grades.

The building includes a gymnasium, a media center, a technology lab, a music room, an art room, and a theater room.

Stadium Drive is an arts-focused school, where its administrators believe that "Academics Shine Through the Arts." In addition, Stadium Drive was the first elementary school in the Lake Orion School District to be awarded the Outcomes Endorsement status from the North Central Association. It was awarded the ArtServe Michigan "School of Distinction" status in May 2000.

Prosecutors filed weapons charges against a seven-year-old boy who allegedly brought a loaded pistol to the school and threatened the life of a fellow student in March 1999. Authorities said the Stadium Drive student is the youngest child in recent memory to face criminal charges in Oakland County.
