= Zach Line =

American football player and coach (born 1990)

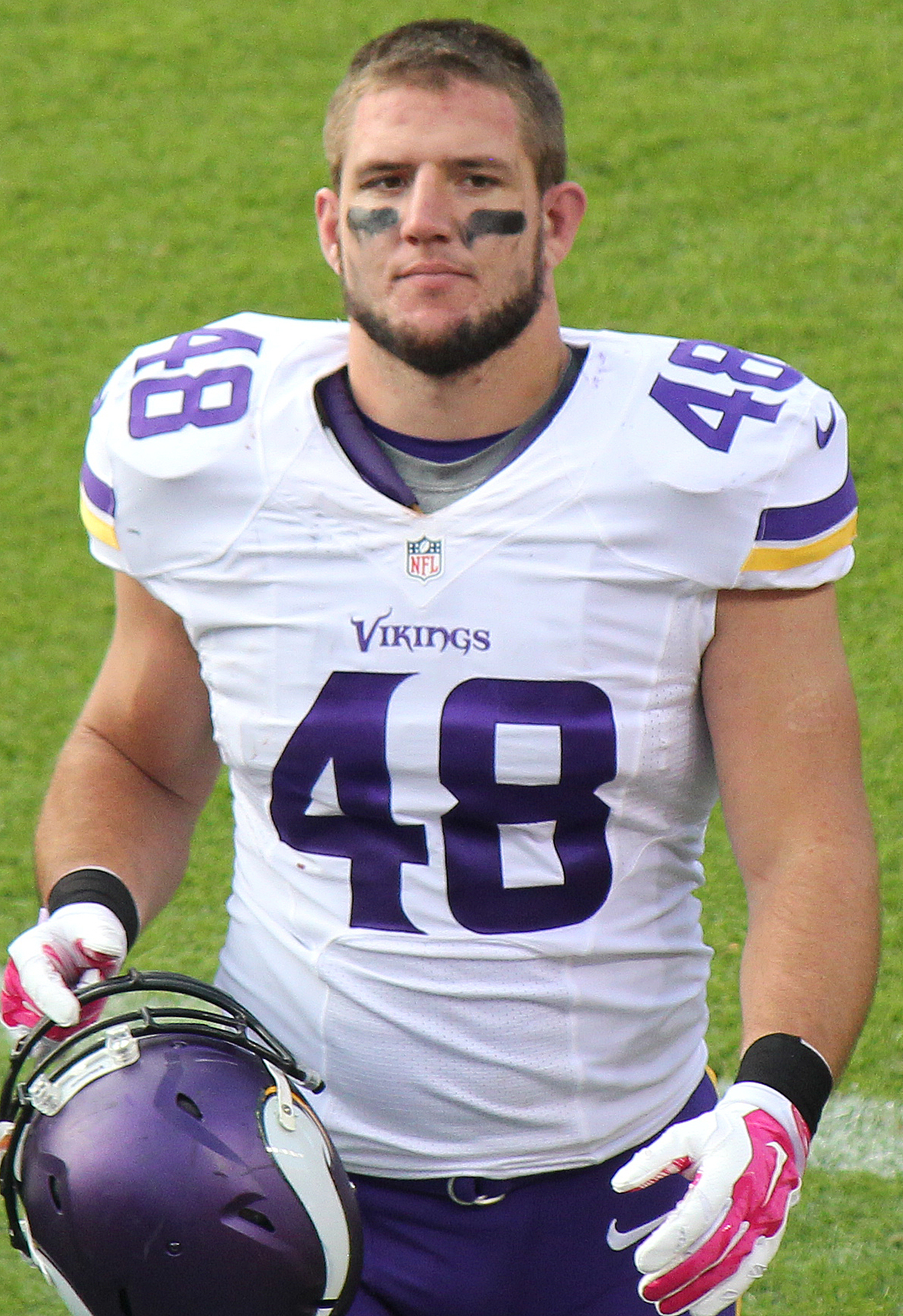
- Line with the Minnesota Vikings in 2015

Denver Broncos
- Title: Special teams quality control coach

Personal information
- Born: April 26, 1990 (age 36); Oxford, Michigan, U.S.
- Listed height: 6 ft 1 in (1.85 m)
- Listed weight: 233 lb (106 kg)

Career information
- Position: Fullback (No. 48, 42)
- High school: Oxford
- College: SMU (2009–2012)
- NFL draft: 2013: undrafted

Career history

Playing
- Minnesota Vikings (2013–2016); New Orleans Saints (2017–2019)

Coaching
- Oxford HS (MI) (2020–2024) Head coach; Denver Broncos (2025–present) Special teams quality control coach

Awards and highlights
- C-USA Offensive Player of the Year (2012); 3× First-team All-C-USA (2010, 2011, 2012)

Career NFL statistics
- Rushing yards: 114
- Rushing average: 3.2
- Rushing touchdowns: 2
- Receptions: 20
- Receiving yards: 161
- Receiving touchdowns: 4
- Stats at Pro Football Reference

Head coaching record
- Career: 20–28 (.417)

Zach Line (born April 26, 1990) is an American professional football coach and former fullback who is the special teams quality control coach for the Denver Broncos of the National Football League (NFL).

During his seven-year professional career, Line played for the Minnesota Vikings and New Orleans Saints. He was signed by the Vikings as an undrafted free agent in 2013. He played college football for the SMU Mustangs.

== Early life ==
Line attended Oxford High School in Oxford, Michigan. As a senior, he had a team-high 154 tackles with eight forced fumbles and four recoveries from the inside linebacker spot; on offense, he rushed for 1,723 yards with 17 touchdowns while also throwing for three more scores. For his season efforts, he was named a first Team All-State pick.

Regarded as a two-star recruit by Rivals.com, Line committed to SMU on January 29, 2008. He also received a scholarship offer from Robert Morris University. Line has two brothers, Prescott and Ben, that played at Michigan State University and Robert Morris University, respectively.

== College career ==
Line attended and played college football at SMU from 2009 to 2012. In the 2009 season, he finished with 49 carries for 189 rushing yards and seven rushing touchdowns. In the 2010 season, he finished with 244 carries for 1,494 rushing yards and ten rushing touchdowns. In the 2011 season, he finished with 208 carries for 1,224 rushing yards and 17 rushing touchdowns. In the 2012 season, his final collegiate season, he finished with 277 carries for 1,278 rushing yards and 13 rushing touchdowns.

=== Collegiate statistics ===
Year	School	Conf	Class	Pos	G	Rushing				Receiving			
Year	School	Conf	Class	Pos	G	Att	Yds	Avg	TD	Rec	Yds	Avg	TD
2009	SMU	CUSA	FR	RB	13	49	189	3.9	7	10	68	6.8	0
2010	SMU	CUSA	SO	RB	14	244	1,494	6.1	10	17	163	9.6	0
2011	SMU	CUSA	JR	RB	10	208	1,224	5.9	17	15	139	9.3	0
2012	SMU	CUSA	SR	RB	13	277	1,278	4.6	13	33	229	6.9	0
Career	SMU				50	778	4,185	5.4	47	75	599	8.0	0

== Professional career ==
Pre-draft measurables
Height	Weight	Arm length	Hand span	Wingspan	40-yard dash	10-yard split	20-yard split	20-yard shuttle	Three-cone drill	Vertical jump	Broad jump	Bench press
6 ft 0 1/2 in (1.84 m)	232 lb (105 kg)	30 3/4 in (0.78 m)	8 3/4 in (0.22 m)	6 ft 1 1/8 in (1.86 m)	4.65 s	1.60 s	2.68 s	4.40 s	7.12 s	33.0 in (0.84 m)	9 ft 9 in (2.97 m)	26 reps
All values from NFL Combine and Pro Day

=== Minnesota Vikings ===
On April 27, 2013, Line signed with the Minnesota Vikings as an undrafted free agent following the 2013 NFL draft. In the Vikings' first preseason game against the Houston Texans, he scored on a 61-yard touchdown pass from quarterback Matt Cassel. In the season opener against the Detroit Lions, he had one reception for eight yards in his NFL debut. He appeared in two other games in the 2013 season. Line was released by the team on September 14, 2014, re-signed to the practice squad shortly after, then was promoted to the active roster on October 3. On September 20, 2015, Line scored the first touchdown of his career against the Detroit Lions. The next week, against the San Diego Chargers, Line scored another touchdown, the second of his career. Line also caught a pass from quarterback Teddy Bridgewater and took it 49 yards to set up a score in Minnesota's 28–19 victory over the Detroit Lions in Week 7. Overall, in the 2015 season, he finished with six carries for ten rushing yards and two rushing touchdowns to go along with six receptions for 95 receiving yards and one receiving touchdown. In the 2016 season, he finished with seven carries for 15 rushing yards in 15 games.

=== New Orleans Saints ===
On August 24, 2017, Line signed with the New Orleans Saints. He was released by New Orleans on September 2. Line was re-signed by the Saints on October 3. In 12 games, he finished with seven carries for 28 rushing yards to go along with two receptions for eight yards and a receiving touchdown. The Saints made the playoffs and faced off against the Carolina Panthers in the Wild Card Round. In the 31–26 victory, he had a one-yard rushing touchdown. Line and the Saints' season ended in the Divisional Round in a 29–24 loss to the Minnesota Vikings.

On April 5, 2018, Line re-signed with the Saints on a two-year contract. In Week 3 against the Atlanta Falcons, Line scored his first touchdown on the season. He finished the 2018 season with nine carries for 41 rushing yards to go along with five receptions for 14 receiving yards and two receiving touchdowns.

In the 2019 season, Line appeared in 12 games and recorded seven carries for 20 rushing yards to go along with six receptions for 36 receiving yards.

On January 15, 2020, Line announced his retirement from the NFL via Instagram after seven seasons at the age of 29.

Line finished his career with 36 rushing attempts for 114 yards and two touchdowns and caught 20 receptions for 161 yards and four touchdowns. Line returned five kickoffs for 59 yards and recorded seven special teams tackles over the span of his career playing on special teams.

== Coaching career ==
=== Oxford ===
In 2020, Line began working at his alma mater, Oxford High School, as head coach.

=== Denver Broncos ===
On March 6, 2025, Line was hired as the special teams quality control coach for the Denver Broncos, reuniting with former Saints head coach Sean Payton.

== Head coaching record ==
Year	Team	Overall	Conference	Standing	Bowl/playoffs
Oxford Wildcats (Oakland Activities Association) (2020–2024)
2020	Oxford	2–5	1–3	4th (Red)	
2021	Oxford	6–5	3–2	3rd (Red)	
2022	Oxford	1–8	0–5	6th (Red)	
2023	Oxford	4–6	1–4	5th (Red)	
2024	Oxford	7–4	3–1	1st (Red)	OAA Red League Champions
Oxford:		20–28	8–15		
Total:		20–28			
National championship Conference title Conference division title or championship game berth
