= 2021 Oxford High School shooting =

Mass shooting in Michigan, U.S.

Oxford High School shooting
- Crumbley, wearing a hoodie and face covering, aiming his pistol down a hallway during the shooting

- Oxford (Michigan) Oxford (the United States)
- Location: 42°50′17″N 83°15′40″W; Oxford Township, Michigan, U.S.
- Date: November 30, 2021; 4 years ago c. 12:51 (Note: Sources do not agree on the exact time when the shooting started. WDIV-TV and WZZM say the shooting started at 12:51 p.m. CNN reported that, according to a prosecutor, the suspect, Ethan Crumbley, was seen with a backpack before 12:51, "then a minute or two later he exited [a] bathroom without the backpack but with a gun in hand". Detroit Free Press and BBC News reported that police received the first 9-1-1 calls at 12:51.) – 12:55 p.m. (EST UTC−05:00)
- Target: Students and staff at Oxford High School
- Attack type: Mass shooting, school shooting, mass murder, pedicide
- Weapon: 9mm SIG Sauer SP 2022 semi-automatic pistol
- Deaths: 4
- Injuries: 7
- Perpetrator: Ethan Robert Crumbley
- Motive: Unestablished
- Verdict: Ethan: Pleaded guilty Jennifer and James: Guilty on all counts
- Convictions: Ethan: Terrorism resulting in death; First-degree murder (4 counts); Assault with intent to murder (7 counts); Possession of a firearm during the commission of a felony (12 counts); Jennifer and James: Involuntary manslaughter (4 counts)
- Sentence: Ethan: Life imprisonment without the possibility of parole, plus 24 years Jennifer and James: 10 to 15 years in prison
- Convicted: Jennifer and James Crumbley (Ethan’s parents)
- Litigation: 3 lawsuits (Note: Lawsuit against the school district; Wrongful death lawsuit against Ethan, James, and Jennifer Crumbley; Lawsuit against dealer of Crumbley's weapon)

On November 30, 2021, a school shooting occurred at Oxford High School in Oxford Township, Michigan, United States. Ethan Robert Crumbley, a 15-year-old fatally shot four people and wounded seven others, including a teacher, using a 9mm semi-automatic handgun. Authorities arrested and charged Crumbley as an adult for 24 crimes. Crumbley pleaded guilty to all of the charges in October 2022 and was sentenced in December 2023 to life imprisonment without the possibility of parole, plus an additional 24 years.

Crumbley's parents, Jennifer and James Crumbley, were charged with involuntary manslaughter for failing to secure the handgun used in the rampage. After failing to appear for their arraignment, the parents were the subjects of a manhunt by the U.S. Marshals; they were caught and arrested in Detroit. The Crumbleys were tried and convicted separately of four counts of involuntary manslaughter and were jointly sentenced on April 9, 2024, to the maximum allowed: 15 years in prison, with the possibility of parole after 10 years.

Lawsuits were filed against the school district, Oxford Community Schools, alleging negligence by school officials towards warning signs exhibited by Crumbley leading up to the shooting. It is the deadliest school shooting by a lone shooter in Michigan’s history.

== Background ==
Oxford High School used the active shooter drill known as ALICE (Alert, Lockdown, Inform, Counter, and Evacuate), which uses proactive strategies to evade a gunman, such as using noise as a distraction and creating distance. The teachers were also trained to use a barrier at the base of the door called Nightlock, which was installed on every door of the school in 2017, three years before such barriers were required by Michigan law.

According to students and parents, rumors about threats of a mass shooting at the school were circulating before it occurred, prompting some students to stay home the day of the incident. Earlier that month, following an act of vandalism which included the hurling of a severed deer head from the school roof into the courtyard, school administrators published a note to parents, saying they had been investigating the rumors, but found no threat. Oakland County Sheriff Michael Bouchard asserted that his office was also unaware of any credible threats prior to the shooting.

== Shooting ==
Crumbley entering a bathroom shortly before the shooting started.

Surveillance footage showed Ethan Robert Crumbley entering a bathroom and exiting it about a minute later, holding a semi-automatic handgun. Immediately afterwards, he started firing in the hallway as hundreds of students passed through, transitioning from one class to another. When the students began fleeing, he methodically and deliberately walked down the hallway and shot into classrooms and at anyone who was unable to escape until he moved on toward another classroom. Due to the quick response by students and staff, Crumbley was unable to actually enter any of the classrooms.

According to students, a voice over the intercom alerted them to an active shooter, and their teachers started locking and barricading doors and covering windows, convincing them it was not a drill. Others recounted hearing loud, banging sounds, before they realized the noises were gunshots and quickly locked the door. One student, who hid in a toilet stall, recalled hearing a gun being cocked outside the bathroom. Once the school had been secured, he opened the bathroom door to find several bodies lying on the floor.

At 12:51 p.m., police received the first of approximately 100 9-1-1 calls about the shooting and headed to the school. Within two or three minutes of first-responder arrival on the scene, Crumbley was arrested, unharmed, by a deputy, assigned as a school resource officer, and a second deputy. The assailant allegedly still had seven rounds of ammunition loaded into his gun and two 15-round magazines. At a news conference, Oakland County Undersheriff Michael McCabe said Crumbley surrendered to deputies without incident. The entire shooting lasted about five minutes and occurred in the southern end of the school building. A total of 32 spent bullet casings were found at the school.

Immediately afterwards, the school went into lockdown. Some students were evacuated to a nearby Meijer store, and one woman helped shelter children in her house. Authorities conducted three sweeps of the building in search of victims and evidence. At least one student posted a video to social media, showing people hiding in a classroom while someone out in the hallway spoke to them, claiming to be law enforcement. Those locked down in the classroom mistakenly believed the speaker was the shooter. They ultimately fled through the windows, and, from there, a deputy led them to safety. During a subsequent press conference, Sheriff Bouchard confirmed that, based on surveillance footage, Crumbley had never knocked on a door, and the person speaking from the hall was likely a detective trying to calm the students.

== Victims ==
Three students—Madisyn Baldwin, 17; Tate Myre, 16; and Hana St. Juliana, 14—were killed at the scene, and eight other people, including a teacher, were injured. Myre was reportedly shot while attempting to stop the gunman; he died in a police vehicle en route to the hospital. On December 1, a fourth student, 17-year-old Justin Shilling, died in the hospital from his injuries.

By the night of November 30, three of the injured were in critical condition, (Note: This number includes Justin Shilling, who died on December 1.) with one on a ventilator; another was in serious condition, three were in stable condition, and the injured teacher was discharged after being treated for a graze wound to the shoulder. The last of the injured was discharged on January 17, 2022, more than a month after the shooting.

== Investigation ==
The school was processed by investigators, with video footage from security cameras within the building as their primary focus. Officials told reporters that the cameras showed some of the actual shooting, and that Crumbley had a clear intent to kill other students, saying he fired through barricaded doors and aimed for the heads and chests of victims at close range.

A search warrant was also executed at Crumbley's home, where a cell phone, a journal, several long guns, and other items were seized as part of the investigation into the shooting and Crumbley's prior social media posts. The cell phone contained two videos of Crumbley—both filmed the night before the incident—in which he purportedly talked about his plans to shoot and kill students at the school the following day. The journal also reportedly detailed "his desire to shoot up the school," and was quoted as including: "Hopefully my shooting will cause Biden to get impeached." According to Sheriff Bouchard, as reported on December 4, investigators had spoken with Crumbley's parents during the search of their home, but not afterwards.

=== School response ===
Following public scrutiny of the school's handling of reports about Crumbley's behavior, the superintendent of Oxford Community Schools, the school district that includes Oxford High School, announced that a third-party investigation of the incident would be conducted. He also said he would recommend a review of the district's "entire system" to school board members. The office of Michigan Attorney General Dana Nessel offered to conduct the investigation, but the district declined the offer. Instead, the district stated that it would use an "outside firm" for the investigation. Later, during an interview with WXYZ-TV, Nessel criticized the district's decision to hire a third party to conduct an investigation, saying she did not believe it was appropriate. She also expressed her doubts that the results of the investigation would be made public.

On December 6, prosecutor Karen McDonald said Oxford High School officials had legal grounds to search Crumbley's backpack and locker when concerns were raised about his behavior on the day of the shooting, but they never did so, for reasons which were not made clear. She also said that charges against school officials were not being ruled out. On December 8, Nessel announced her office's intent to review the actions taken by the school leading up to the shooting, despite the district turning down her offer to do so, saying, "I really do think it's incumbent upon the Michigan Department of Attorney General and the top law enforcement official in the state to conduct a further review."

== Perpetrator ==
The shooter was identified as 15-year-old sophomore student Ethan Robert Crumbley (born April 28, 2006). He was in class on the day of the shooting.

Crumbley was placed under suicide watch after being taken to the county's juvenile detention facility. He initially maintained his right to silence.

Crumbley was born in Atlantic Beach, Florida, 15 miles (20 km) east of Jacksonville, to parents Jennifer and James, both of whom had prior minor criminal records from 1995 to 2005 for DUI and check fraud. During Ethan's childhood, both parents worked in business development and marketing, before moving the family to Issaquah, Washington, a few years later.

A former neighbor told the Detroit Free Press that, shortly after the family's subsequent move to Michigan, in 2014 and 2015, Jennifer and James often left their son home alone and without a phone as they frequented bars in downtown Lake Orion. The neighbor became so concerned that she filed an anonymous complaint by phone with the state's child protective services agency, but she did not know whether any action was taken. According to prosecutors, Ethan's only friend moved away at the end of October 2021, and the family dog died, plunging him into depression. As early as March 2021, he started sending his mother "disturbing texts about his state of mind," which included claims about "demons" and "ghosts" inside the home. He also reportedly videotaped himself torturing animals, making Molotov cocktails, and sketching himself committing a school shooting, something he also joked about with a friend via text message. At one point, Crumbley allegedly kept a baby bird's head in a jar, which he later placed in a school bathroom. His parents allegedly never sought therapy for him following any of those incidents or behaviors.

=== Weapon ===
A 9mm SIG Sauer SP 2022 semi-automatic handgun and at least two 15-round magazines were recovered from Crumbley at the time of his arrest, while a third magazine was found at the school. Bouchard said James Crumbley had purchased the gun under his own name from a local gun shop on Black Friday, four days prior to the shooting. Prosecutor Karen McDonald later said that Ethan Crumbley was with his father at the time of the purchase and that he posted about it on social media later that day. McDonald also said that Jennifer Crumbley referred to the gun as Ethan's "new Christmas present" in a social media post. Based on recovered shell casings found in the school, authorities believe at least 30 shots were fired. It was unclear how Ethan gained possession of the gun or how he brought it into the school building. In Michigan, minors cannot legally possess guns, other than within limited circumstances, such as when hunting with an adult.

=== Behavior immediately prior to the shooting ===
Police said there was no indication that Crumbley had faced any disciplinary issues prior to the shooting. Still, Crumbley was reported to have met with school officials the day prior to the shooting, and once again early on the day of the shooting, to discuss his behavior. Prosecutor Karen McDonald later provided a timeline regarding the meetings. The first meeting occurred after a teacher spotted Crumbley using his phone to search for ammunition and reported him. During the discussion, Crumbley told them that he and his mother, Jennifer, had recently traveled to a shooting range and that "shooting sports are a family hobby." School officials left a voicemail and email for Jennifer Crumbley; she did not respond, but later texted her son, writing "LOL I'm not mad at you. You have to learn not to get caught."

The second meeting occurred on the day of the shooting after another teacher found a violent drawing on Crumbley's desk, described by McDonald in a press conference as:

A drawing of a semiautomatic handgun, pointing at the words, "The thoughts won't stop. Help me." In another section of the note was a drawing of a bullet, with the following words above that bullet: "Blood everywhere." Between the drawing of the gun and the bullet is a drawing of a person who appears to have been shot twice and bleeding. Below that figure is a drawing of a laughing emoji. Further down the drawing are the words, "My life is useless." And to the right of it are the words, "The world is dead."

The teacher took a photo of the drawing, which was on a math worksheet, and reported Crumbley. He was taken to a guidance counselor's office, where school staff phoned Crumbley's parents, requesting that they come to the school. According to the superintendent of Oxford Community Schools, while waiting for his parents to arrive, school counselors did not observe any behavior from Crumbley that indicated to them that he might harm others. Upon their arrival, Crumbley's parents were shown the drawing – which Crumbley had scribbled over by that point in an attempt to conceal its contents – and instructed to seek counseling for their son within 48 hours, otherwise the school would call child protective services. Crumbley's parents, despite being told that he was displaying suicidal ideation, "resisted the idea" of taking their son home at the time, did not inform school officials that they had purchased a gun for him four days earlier, and at 10:54 a.m, they left the school. Despite being told their son was suicidal and had drawn a handgun on his homework with the words "help me", neither James nor Jennifer Crumbley tried to ascertain the gun's location when they returned home; indeed, according to McDonald, by the time the meeting between school staff and the Crumbleys had taken place at the school that morning, Crumbley had already placed the weapon he was to use in the shooting somewhere on school grounds.

Crumbley was returned to class that same morning, as he had no prior disciplinary issues. Crumbley's mother texted him at 12:38 p.m., 12 minutes before the killings started, to see how he was doing.

Crumbley committed the shooting at 12:50 p.m., following this second meeting between himself, his parents, and school officials. Prosecutors further alleged that at 1:22 p.m. — seven minutes after the first news reports came in of a shooting at the school and before any mention of who was responsible — Jennifer Crumbley texted her son, saying, "Ethan, don't do it." At 1:37 p.m., James Crumbley called 911 to report a SIG Sauer SP 2022 handgun as missing and that Ethan "could be the gunman at Oxford High."

According to the Oxford Community Schools superintendent on December 2, no discipline had been warranted at the time of the meetings with Crumbley and his parents. Sheriff Bouchard said concerns about Crumbley's troubling behavior had never been shared with his office.

== Legal proceedings ==
=== Against Ethan Crumbley ===
==== Trial ====
State of Michigan v. Crumbley
- Court: Michigan 52nd Judicial District Court, Division 3
- Citation: 21-006611-FY

Court membership
- Judge sitting: Nancy T. Carniak

Crumbley was arraigned by a magistrate on homicide and attempted homicide charges shortly after he was arrested, to allow for continued custody, but he was not immediately charged as an adult. On December 1, 2021, he was charged with terrorism causing death, first-degree murder, assault with intent to murder, and possession of a firearm during the commission of a felony, with the possibility of more charges being added as the investigation continued. According to the Associated Press, this appeared to be the first time in U.S. history where a terrorism charge was filed in relation to a gunfire incident on school grounds. The terrorism charge is provided under Michigan law for "an act that is intended to intimidate or coerce a civilian population"— in this case, the Oxford High School community.

Crumbley was charged as an adult, and the judge, Nancy T. Carniak, entered a plea of not guilty on his behalf. He was ordered to be held without bond and relocated to the Oakland County Jail, and Carniak scheduled a probable cause conference (Note: A probable cause conference, which is "akin to an informal pretrial conference between the prosecution and defense," is required in all felony cases by Michigan law (Mich. Comp. Laws § 766.4) and Michigan Court Rule 6.108.) for December 13 and a preliminary examination for December 20. The court appointed a lawyer for Crumbley after his parents hired lawyers for themselves, but did not do so for their son.

At Crumbley's probable cause conference on December 13, Carniak postponed the upcoming preliminary examination to January 7, 2022, to allow prosecutors to review evidence. Crumbley's appointed guardian ad litem asked that he be moved back to the juvenile detention center, as Crumbley could "hear other adults, which violates the [Michigan] statute for minors being held in adult facilities;" the request was denied by Carniak. Assistant prosecutor Marc Keast said he would contact the Oakland County Jail regarding Crumbley's proximity to adults. On January 7, 2022, Crumbley waived the probable cause hearing and was bound over for trial.

On January 12, 2022, a plea of not guilty was entered on Crumbley's behalf during his arraignment. On January 26, 2022, Crumbley announced he would plead insanity via a court filing made by his lawyers. He also requested an evaluation of his criminal responsibility, which is standard procedure; Crumbley was to be evaluated by a doctor from the Center for Forensic Psychiatry.

On October 24, 2022, Crumbley pleaded guilty to all of the charges and withdrew his intent to pursue an insanity defense. He also admitted during questioning on that day that his own money was used to purchase the weapon used and claimed that the gun was not locked away on the day of the shooting.

On September 29, 2023, Judge Kwame Rowe ruled that Crumbley was eligible for a sentence of life without parole. In his ruling, Rowe said that while Crumbley's youth and difficulties at home were mitigating factors, they did not outweigh the seriousness of his crime. Rowe also pointed out that Crumbley's obsession with violence had persisted during his time in jail, citing an incident wherein Crumbley accessed violent material online using a hacked tablet. As a juvenile, Crumbley was entitled to a hearing, under a 2012 U.S. Supreme Court ruling in Miller v. Alabama, to determine whether he would be eligible for parole after serving at least 25 years. A formal sentencing was scheduled for December 8, 2023.

On December 9, 2023, it was announced that Crumbley had been sentenced to life in prison without the possibility of parole. Right before the sentencing Crumbley apologized to the courtroom and stated that "Any sentence that [the victims] ask for, I ask that you do impose it on me" and that he was truly sorry.

After turning 18 on April 28, 2024, Crumbley was moved to Oaks Correctional Facility in Manistee, Michigan.

==== Appeals ====
On June 7, 2024, appellate attorneys for Ethan Crumbley filed a motion asking to withdraw the guilty plea and request a new sentencing on the basis of ineffective assistance of counsel. His attorneys claimed that his mother used alcohol during pregnancy, which was not raised by his previous defense attorneys. The prenatal alcohol exposure could have caused Crumbley to suffer from cognitive-adaptive dysfunctions due to fetal alcohol spectrum disorder, and Judge Kwame Rowe did not ensure that Crumbley understood the consequences of entering a guilty plea in light of his cognitive impairments and history of mental illness. On December 19, Rowe rejected both requests, writing that the "plea was knowingly, voluntarily, and accurately given and there was no defect in the plea-taking process."

On May 6, 2025, the Michigan Court of Appeals dismissed Crumbley's appeal to withdraw his guilty plea. The same court also rejected a second appeal against Crumbley's life sentence.

=== Against Crumbley's parents ===
==== Announcement of charges ====
After announcing the charges against Ethan Crumbley, prosecutor Karen McDonald told reporters that her office was also considering criminal charges against Crumbley's parents, Jennifer and James, in connection with the shooting. She said responsible gun ownership was crucial to stop tragedies, and those who are irresponsible with their firearms should be held accountable. On December 3, McDonald held a press conference in which, in a rare instance of parents being charged in relation to a school shooting, prosecutor McDonald announced that both parents were being charged with four counts of involuntary manslaughter for their failure to secure the gun Crumbley used in the shooting; James and Jennifer Crumbley were thus the first US parents to be charged with having responsibility for a mass school shooting by a child.

==== Search on December 3–4 ====
After charges were announced against Crumbley's parents Jennifer and James, an alert was issued hours later by state authorities, as the Crumbleys had left the Oxford Township area and not returned as expected to meet with their attorneys and turn themselves in. The Oakland County Sheriff's Office said the Federal Bureau of Investigation (FBI), the U.S. Marshals Service, and the Oakland County Fugitive Apprehension Team were searching for the parents; the FBI said they were not involved at the time.

Shortly after, the Crumbleys' attorneys told the Detroit Free Press that their clients did not flee but rather left town for their own safety and would return to be arraigned. However, both parents missed their 4:00 p.m. arraignment and remained at large. Undersheriff McCabe told CNN that the attorneys had not talked with the parents after attempting to reach them by phone and text without success. CNN reported that Jennifer and James had withdrawn $4,000 from an ATM in Rochester Hills on December 3 and that they had turned off their cell phones. Late on December 3, the U.S. Marshals released wanted posters for Jennifer and James and also announced rewards of up to $10,000 for information leading to their arrests.

At around 11:05 p.m. on December 3, police received a tip from a business owner who found the Crumbleys' vehicle in his parking lot in Detroit, about 40 miles (64 km) from Oxford. The man also said he saw Jennifer Crumbley, who fled upon being spotted. Police responded to the scene about 20 minutes later and established a perimeter in the area. At around 2:00 a.m. on December 4, police took the couple into custody after finding them in a first-floor room at a nearby commercial building. In a press conference on December 4, the Oakland County Sheriff reported that a person had assisted the parents in entering the building, that additional charges may be filed against them in relation to their fleeing, and that there would also be charges brought against the person who had helped them. He also said that the Crumbleys were unarmed and very distressed during the arrests, and that there was no indication they had planned to surrender.

The person believed to have assisted the Crumbleys identified himself through his attorney as an Oakland County resident who operated a business in the building. He claimed not to have been aware that the couple was wanted by authorities at the time he allowed them to stay in his workspace, but declined to elaborate on the nature of his association with them. He was questioned by authorities, who described him as being cooperative. Police conducted a search on his home in Troy and seized several digital devices.

==== Pre-trial proceedings ====
Jennifer and James Crumbley were arraigned on December 4, where they pleaded not guilty to the charges, and a bail of $500,000 each was set for them. Federal prosecutors began investigating whether federal laws were violated when James Crumbley purchased a handgun for his son. The Crumbleys were held at Oakland County Jail, where their son was also being confined. As a result, all three were put in isolation, monitored under suicide watch, and not allowed to interact for an indefinite amount of time.

During the Crumbleys' probable cause conference on December 14, a judge postponed their preliminary examination to February 8, 2022, while setting a bond hearing for January 7 of that year. During the bond hearing, the judge sided with the prosecutors and declined to lower the Crumbleys' bond, saying they were a flight risk and the charges were too serious to warrant a lowering.

In early 2024, the judge in their cases ruled that Jennifer Crumbley and James Crumbley would be granted separate trials, the first of which was scheduled to begin January 23, 2024. The Crumbleys were held in jail for over two years awaiting trial.

==== Trial results ====
Jennifer Crumbley's trial concluded on February 6, 2024, and that of James on March 14. Juries found the Crumbleys guilty on all four counts of involuntary manslaughter. On April 9, 2024, they were given the maximum sentence of 15 years in prison, with the possibility of parole after 10 years. Jennifer was imprisoned in the Women's Huron Valley Correctional Facility and James in the Bellamy Creek Correctional Facility.

==== Appeals ====
On December 2, 2024, Jennifer Crumbley's new appellate attorneys filed a motion asking to dismiss her original conviction or order a new trial, on multiple grounds, especially that a confidential proffer agreement between prosecutors and several school officials was not revealed by prosecutors as part of Brady disclosure. Crumbley's attorney also alleged inconsistent culpability theories by charging her son, Ethan, as an adult while also claiming that she had a responsibility to control her minor child, had no duty to protect the victims of the shooting, that the jury instructions were flawed, and that she had ineffective assistance of counsel. James Crumbley's attorneys filed an appeal in April 2025, also arguing that he did not receive a fair trial because the proffer agreement was not disclosed. In June 2025, Judge Cheryl Matthews denied both appeals and upheld the convictions of the Crumbleys.

=== Against the school district ===
On December 9, 2021, multiple survivors of the shooting filed two $100 million lawsuits against Oxford Community Schools and its employees. At least one lawsuit alleges that school officials failed to stop the shooting and ignored several warning signs, such as threats posted to social media that had been brought to the school's attention. On December 10, a lawyer representing two of the survivors requested a judge to order school officials to restore and preserve social media pages and other evidence that she claimed was willfully destroyed by the district following the shooting; the judge granted the request.

Oxford Community Schools filed a motion to dismiss the original $100 million lawsuit on December 14, claiming that the survivors' attorney filed it without conducting due diligence required by the rules of professional responsibility and that it was done in an effort to "be on the news". The complaint filed by the district's legal representatives claimed that a one-time dean of students had been included as a defendant; due to the survivors' attorney not removing him, the man had received death threats and suffered from significant emotional stress. The complaint argued that the man should be removed from the suit and that the survivors' attorney be given significant sanctions.

On January 8, 2022, survivors of the shooting filed an updated $100 million lawsuit that added eleven new counts against the named school officials. The updated lawsuit included the principal and other administrators, accusing them of "gross negligence" and alleging that their actions "caused serious and permanent physical and emotional trauma." According to the lawsuit, school officials were aware of disturbing posts made by Crumbley on social media, as well as his tendencies toward animal cruelty, but they still allowed him to continue attending the school and directed teachers and counselors to discourage reports of Crumbley's behavior.

On January 19, 2022, the superintendent of Oxford Community Schools issued a statement disputing the accusations made against the district in the lawsuits. He said that school officials did not discover, or were not informed about ammunition being displayed to others by Crumbley; that they were not aware of Crumbley's social media presence; that all tips made to school authorities through the "OK2SAY" tip line during November 2021 had been forwarded to and investigated by law enforcement; and that a different student, not Crumbley, was responsible for leaving a jar with a baby bird's head inside a school bathroom. He also said that Crumbley had met with a counselor and the dean of students prior to the shooting, but not with other school administrators or a "restorative practices coordinator". Additionally, though having no bearing whatsoever on their possible failure to act before the day of the shooting, the superintendent claimed that the Oxford High School principal and assistant principals ran towards the sound of gunfire to administer aid to the injured and look for the gunman. On January 24, 2022, the district asked a federal judge to suspend the lawsuit until the criminal trials of Crumbley and his parents were concluded, saying the lawsuit could interfere with the prosecution of the Crumbleys.

On March 6, 2023, a state judge dismissed the lawsuits against Oxford Community Schools and the staff at the school due to both having immunity from being sued, deeming that Crumbley was the direct cause of the shooting and not the school.

== Aftermath ==
Many students were traumatized and distressed by the shooting, and they were affected by the loss of their classmates or had seen bodies on the ground. The Michigan Department of Health and Human Services supplied help and support to the students and their families. By January 2022, more than $3.2 million in resources had been approved by the Oakland County Board of Commissioners in response to the shooting since November 30.

Oxford Community Schools closed down its schools for the rest of the week. The district's reopening plan included a "soft opening" that included a law enforcement presence and trained clinicians being on standby for support. In December 2021, the district's superintendent announced that when classes resumed after the holiday break, all middle and high school students would be required to wear clear backpacks, while all elementary school students would be required to keep their backpacks in lockers or cubbies all day. However, Oxford High School remained closed and students had been attending classes at other buildings until January 24, 2022.

=== Memorials and fundraisers ===
Three prayer services were held on the night of November 30, attended by hundreds. A memorial was created outside the school with stuffed animals and flowers left behind. A candlelight vigil was held at Michigan State University on December 7 to honor the victims of the shooting.

An online petition was started to rename the school's stadium after Tate Myre, one of the victims killed in the shooting. A memorial patch to commemorate the victims and the shooting was created for the Michigan Wolverines football team that was first worn on December 4, during the Big Ten Championship Game. The Detroit Lions and Minnesota Vikings also created T-shirts and hats and wore a helmet patch to commemorate the victims for their Week 13 game on December 5, while player Jalen Elliott wore an altered version of his No. 42 jersey, which bore Myre's name. Myre was also given an honorary five-star rating by sports recruitment site 247Sports. He also received an honorary offer from Michigan State University.

A GoFundMe was created by a family member of victim Madisyn Baldwin to help pay for funeral costs. Baldwin's family created a hashtag with her name to identify acts of kindness and support as a way to honor her.

Additional fundraisers for the victims and their families were seen on online crowdfunding pages, by local businesses, and by selling items such as T-shirts, to help cover medical, funeral, and other costs. Others used the phrase OxfordStrong to sell fundraising items or as a hashtag on social media. The phrase was also used to identify a drop box location set-up by the township for cards and letters of support.

The organization March for Our Lives held an event in Oxford on December 12 and shared experiences with the students of Oxford High.

=== Copycat threats and arrests ===
Copycat threats against numerous Metro Detroit schools were made the following day on December 1, leading many other area districts to cancel classes for at least one day; according to Sheriff Bouchard, at least 60 schools were affected by the closures. By December 3, at least 519 schools in 70 different districts in Michigan and six other states had closed their schools down in the wake of additional threats. Bouchard also vowed to investigate, and Oakland County Prosecutor McDonald said they will press criminal charges against anyone who threatens violence at schools in the county.

Schools around the country faced threats through social media on December 17, with some closing as a precaution. Others increased security and police presence on campuses, even after investigating the threats and finding that they lacked credibility, with some threats coming from other states. Multiple police stations and school districts issued statements about the threats and actions that would be taken against the individuals who made them. An additional statement was issued by TikTok, where a large majority of threats were allegedly identified as being made; the company removed many of the threatening videos posted and was working with law enforcement.

In July 2024, it was reported that Thomas Matthew Crooks, the attempted assassin of Donald Trump, researched Ethan Crumbley and his family before his attack where he shot Trump in his right ear and killed a spectator.

== Responses ==
President Joe Biden and U.S. Representative Elissa Slotkin, whose district includes Oxford High School, expressed their condolences over the shooting. Governor Gretchen Whitmer said in a statement that she was devastated for the students, staff, and families of the school, calling gun violence a "public health crisis". Whitmer also ordered all flags in Michigan to fly at half-staff. Democratic politicians in the Michigan Legislature vowed to pursue new gun control legislation and revive stalled bills relating to gun control.

The Michigan Legislature eventually enacted a comprehensive four-part firearm safety legislative package. The package introduced universal background checks for all gun purchases, mandated secure firearm storage requirements when minors are in the home, established an extreme risk protection order (ERPO) framework, and instituted a firearm possession ban for individuals convicted of domestic violence misdemeanors.

Families of victims in the Sandy Hook Elementary School shooting expressed their solidarity with the families of the Oxford shooting. In addition, survivors and families of victims in the Parkland high school shooting expressed outrage over the Oxford shooting and expressed their desire to continue fighting for change.

All four professional Detroit sports teams (Lions, Pistons, Red Wings, and Tigers) expressed their condolences to the community.

On October 25, 2023, a student from Detroit Catholic Central High School in nearby Novi posted an Instagram story mocking Oxford's soccer team and the shooting after they lost in the Michigan regional semifinal 2–0 stating "I thought Oxford had shooters!!??". The school later apologized for the student's post.

== See also ==
- List of homicides in Michigan
- List of school shootings in the United States by death toll
- 2023 Michigan State University shooting, which some students who were present at Oxford also survived
- 2024 Apalachee High School shooting
