= Oxford, Michigan =

Village in Michigan, United States

- Village
- Village of Oxford
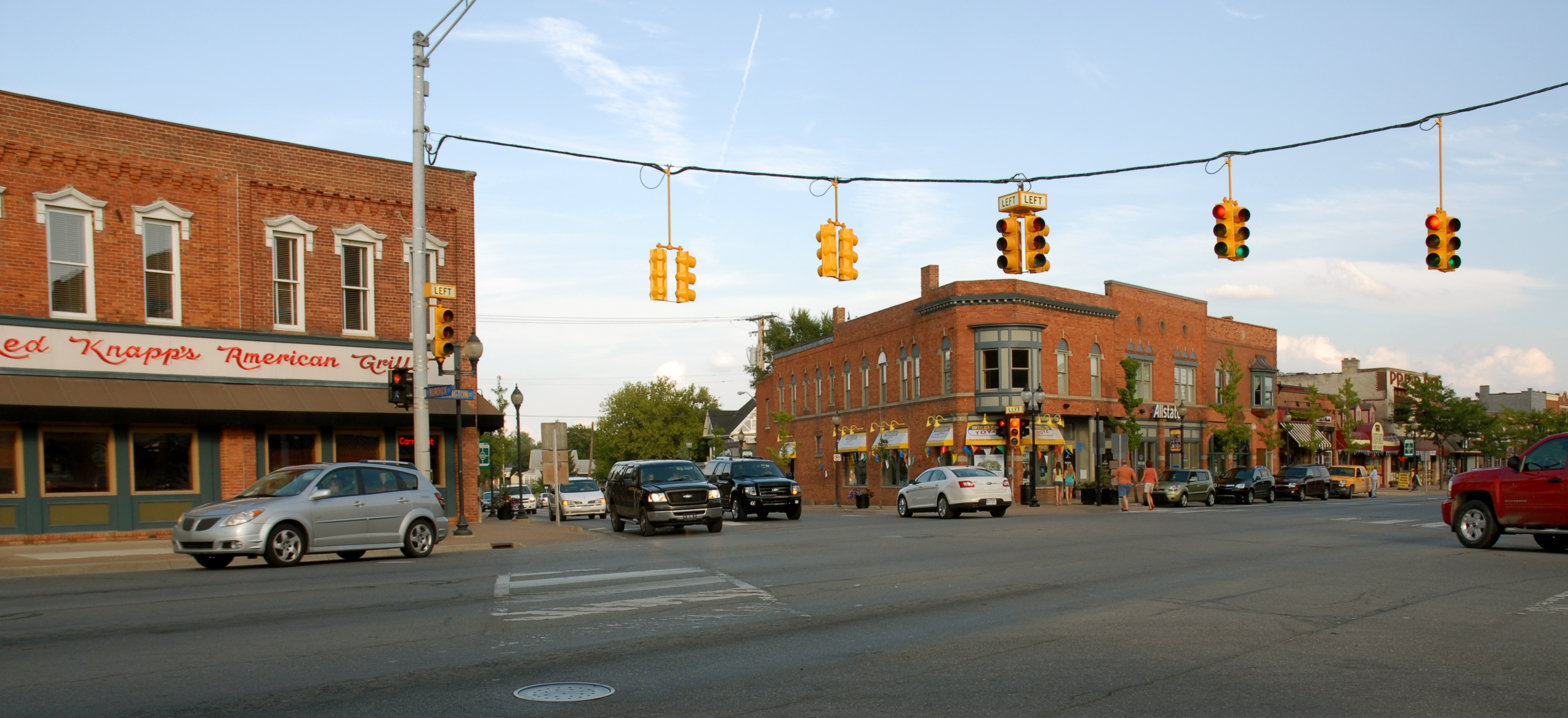
- Intersection of Washington and Burdick
- Motto: "Our past guides our vision for the future."
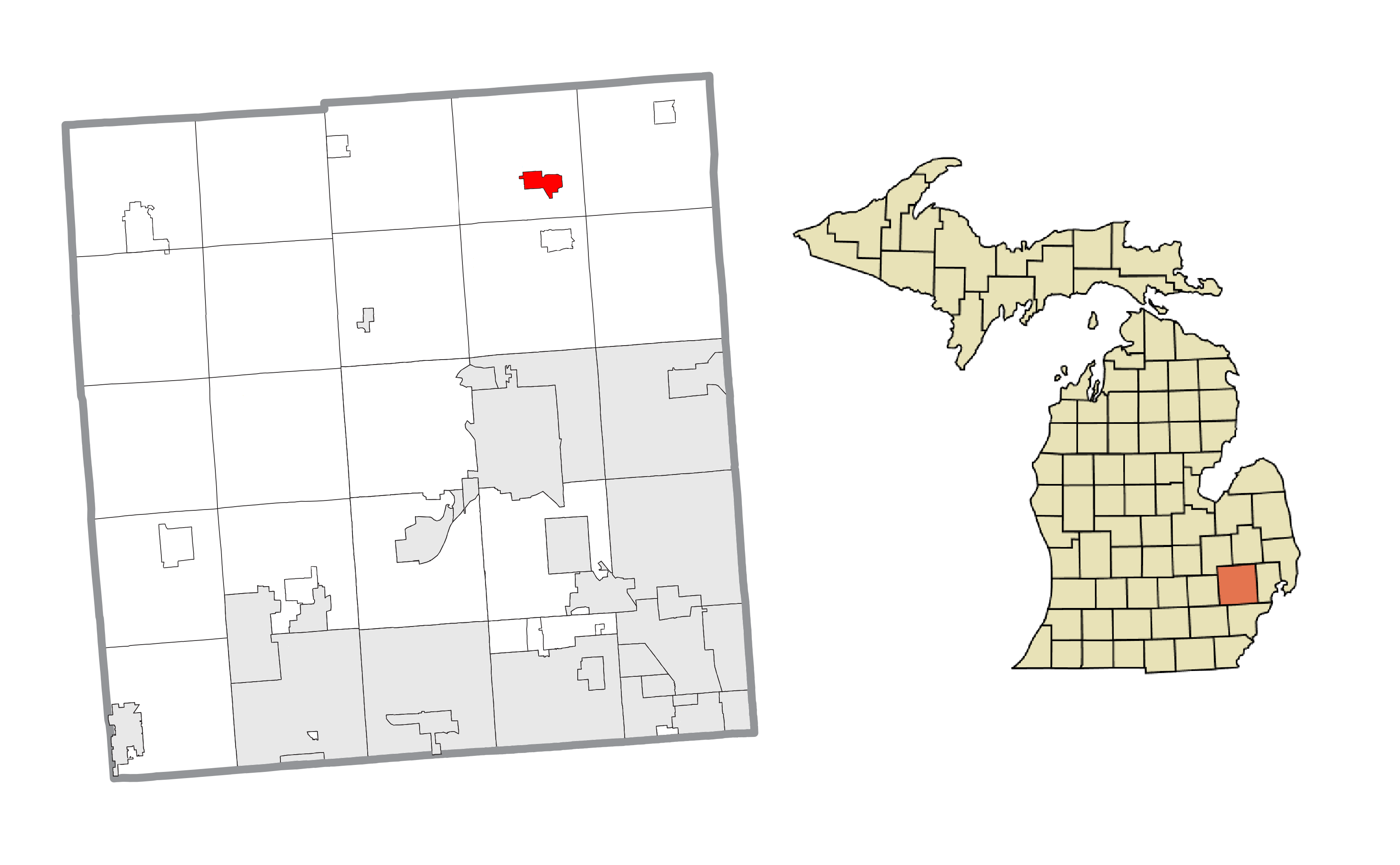
- Location within Oakland County

- Location within the state of Michigan Location within the United States
- Coordinates: 42°49′29″N 83°15′53″W
- Country: United States
- State: Michigan
- County: Oakland
- Township: Oxford
- Settled: 1823
- Incorporated: 1876

Government
  - Type: Village council
  - President: Kelsey Cooke
  - Manager: Joe Madore
  - Clerk: Tere Onica

Area
  - Village: 1.46 sq mi (3.78 km^{2})
  - Land: 1.26 sq mi (3.26 km^{2})
  - Water: 0.20 sq mi (0.52 km^{2})
- Elevation: 1,056 ft (322 m)

Population (2020)
  - Village: 3,492
  - Density: 2,774.7/sq mi (1,071.31/km^{2})
  - Metro: 4,296,250 (Metro Detroit)
- Time zone: UTC-5 (EST)
  - Summer (DST): UTC-4 (EDT)
- ZIP code(s): 48371
- Area codes: 248 and 810
- FIPS code: 26-62020
- GNIS feature ID: 0634267
- Website: Official website

Oxford is a village in Oakland County in the U.S. state of Michigan. As of the 2020 census, Oxford had a population of 3,492. The village is located within Oxford Township. Located about 30 miles (48 km) north of Detroit, it is a northern suburb of the Metro Detroit region.

== History ==
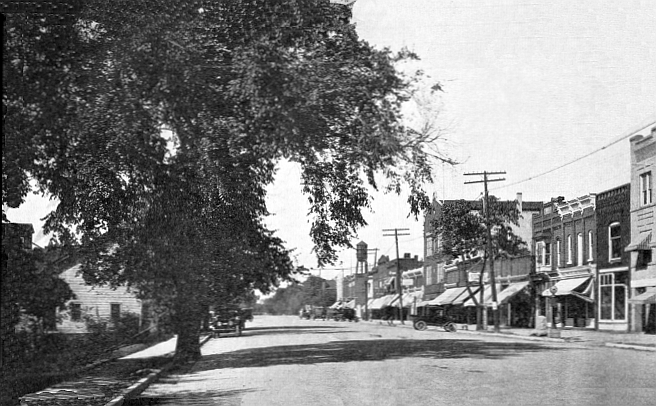
Washington Street, 1922

During the early 19th century the northeast Oakland County area was largely avoided by the early settlers because it was believed to be nothing but impenetrable swamp land. The area was, at that time, nicknamed "The Barren Plains of Oxford." It was called this primarily because of a report made in 1812 by the U.S. Surveyor General that described the area as a poor, barren, sandy land, on which scarcely any vegetation could grow with the exception of some very small scrubby oaks. It was concluded in the surveyors' report there was one acre out of one hundred that appeared to be eligible for cultivation. Any hope for crop production was thought to be preposterous. At this point, the area was deemed worthless, and discouragement of any hope for development by forthcoming settlers was inevitable.

Purchase of public land in what is now called Oxford was in 1823 by a man named Elbridge G. Deming. Soon after, the first person to settle in Oxford was a wolf trapper named Avery Brown. He made use of the land and gave some credibility to its value. It wasn't long after that the first area post office was officially established in what was then known as Demingsburgh on May 2, 1834. Five years later, the name was officially changed to Oxford on January 15, 1839. Elbridge D. Deming was the first postmaster for Oxford, as the post office was located in his log home near the intersection of M-24 and Metamora Road.

On November 30, 2021, a mass shooting occurred at Oxford High School. Four people were killed, and seven others were injured, including an injured teacher. School attendance was very low that day, as rumors had spread earlier that week of a shooting being about to occur. Most of the students escaped into a nearby Meijer. The suspect, a 15-year-old sophomore student, reportedly fired between 15 and 20 bullets in a chemistry room and did not resist arrest.

== Geography ==
According to the United States Census Bureau, the village has a total area of 1.46 square miles (3.78 km^{2}), of which 1.26 square miles (3.26 km^{2}) is land and 0.20 square miles (0.52 km^{2}) (1.37%) is water.

== Demographics ==
Historical population
Census	Pop.	Note	%±
1880	851		—
1890	1,128		32.5%
1900	1,172		3.9%
1910	1,191		1.6%
1920	1,668		40.1%
1930	2,052		23.0%
1940	2,144		4.5%
1950	2,305		7.5%
1960	2,357		2.3%
1970	2,536		7.6%
1980	2,746		8.3%
1990	2,929		6.7%
2000	3,540		20.9%
2010	3,436		−2.9%
2020	3,492		1.6%
U.S. Decennial Census

=== 2020 census ===
As of the 2020 census, Oxford had a population of 3,492. The median age was 40.2 years. 22.9% of residents were under the age of 18 and 15.4% of residents were 65 years of age or older. For every 100 females there were 100.2 males, and for every 100 females age 18 and over there were 96.0 males age 18 and over.

100.0% of residents lived in urban areas, while 0.0% lived in rural areas.

There were 1,447 households in Oxford, of which 30.8% had children under the age of 18 living in them. Of all households, 47.0% were married-couple households, 19.4% were households with a male householder and no spouse or partner present, and 26.6% were households with a female householder and no spouse or partner present. About 31.7% of all households were made up of individuals and 11.2% had someone living alone who was 65 years of age or older.

There were 1,522 housing units, of which 4.9% were vacant. The homeowner vacancy rate was 0.7% and the rental vacancy rate was 6.1%.

Racial composition as of the 2020 census
Race	Number	Percent
White	3,134	89.7%
Black or African American	56	1.6%
American Indian and Alaska Native	2	0.1%
Asian	59	1.7%
Native Hawaiian and Other Pacific Islander	0	0.0%
Some other race	29	0.8%
Two or more races	212	6.1%
Hispanic or Latino (of any race)	144	4.1%

=== 2010 census ===
As of the census of 2010, there were 3,436 people, 1,335 households, and 889 families residing in the village. The population density was 2,748.8 inhabitants per square mile (1,061.3/km^{2}). There were 1,468 housing units at an average density of 1,174.4 per square mile (453.4/km^{2}). The racial makeup of the village was 95.1% White, 1.9% African American, 0.2% Native American, 0.7% Asian, 0.7% from other races, and 1.3% from two or more races. Hispanic or Latino of any race were 4.4% of the population.

There were 1,335 households, of which 33.0% had children under the age of 18 living with them, 51.5% were married couples living together, 10.6% had a female householder with no husband present, 4.6% had a male householder with no wife present, and 33.4% were non-families. 29.1% of all households were made up of individuals, and 6.6% had someone living alone who was 65 years of age or older. The average household size was 2.49 and the average family size was 3.09.

The median age in the village was 38.5 years. 25% of residents were under the age of 18; 8.4% were between the ages of 18 and 24; 27.5% were from 25 to 44; 28.9% were from 45 to 64; and 10.2% were 65 years of age or older. The gender makeup of the village was 49.3% male and 50.7% female.

=== 2000 census ===
As of the census of 2000, there were 3,540 people, 1,402 households, and 918 families residing in the village. The population density was 2,873.5 inhabitants per square mile (1,109.5/km^{2}). There were 1,476 housing units at an average density of 1,198.1 per square mile (462.6/km^{2}). The racial makeup of the village was 97.23% White, 0.59% African American, 0.28% Native American, 0.51% Asian, 0.31% from other races, and 1.05% from two or more races. Hispanic or Latino of any race were 2.66% of the population.

There were 1,402 households, out of which 35.6% had children under the age of 18 living with them, 53.4% were married couples living together, 9.4% had a female householder with no husband present, and 34.5% were non-families. 29.6% of all households were made up of individuals, and 7.2% had someone living alone who was 65 years of age or older. The average household size was 2.51 and the average family size was 3.15.

In the village, the population was spread out, with 28.2% under the age of 18, 8.1% from 18 to 24, 34.4% from 25 to 44, 21.2% from 45 to 64, and 8.2% who were 65 years of age or older. The median age was 34 years. For every 100 females, there were 96.6 males. For every 100 females age 18 and over, there were 93.7 males.

The median income for a household in the village was $53,885, and the median income for a family was $72,875. Males had a median income of $50,179 versus $29,938 for females. The per capita income for the village was $24,811. About 3.0% of families and 5.3% of the population were below the poverty line, including 6.1% of those under age 18 and 10.5% of those age 65 or over.

== Arts and culture ==
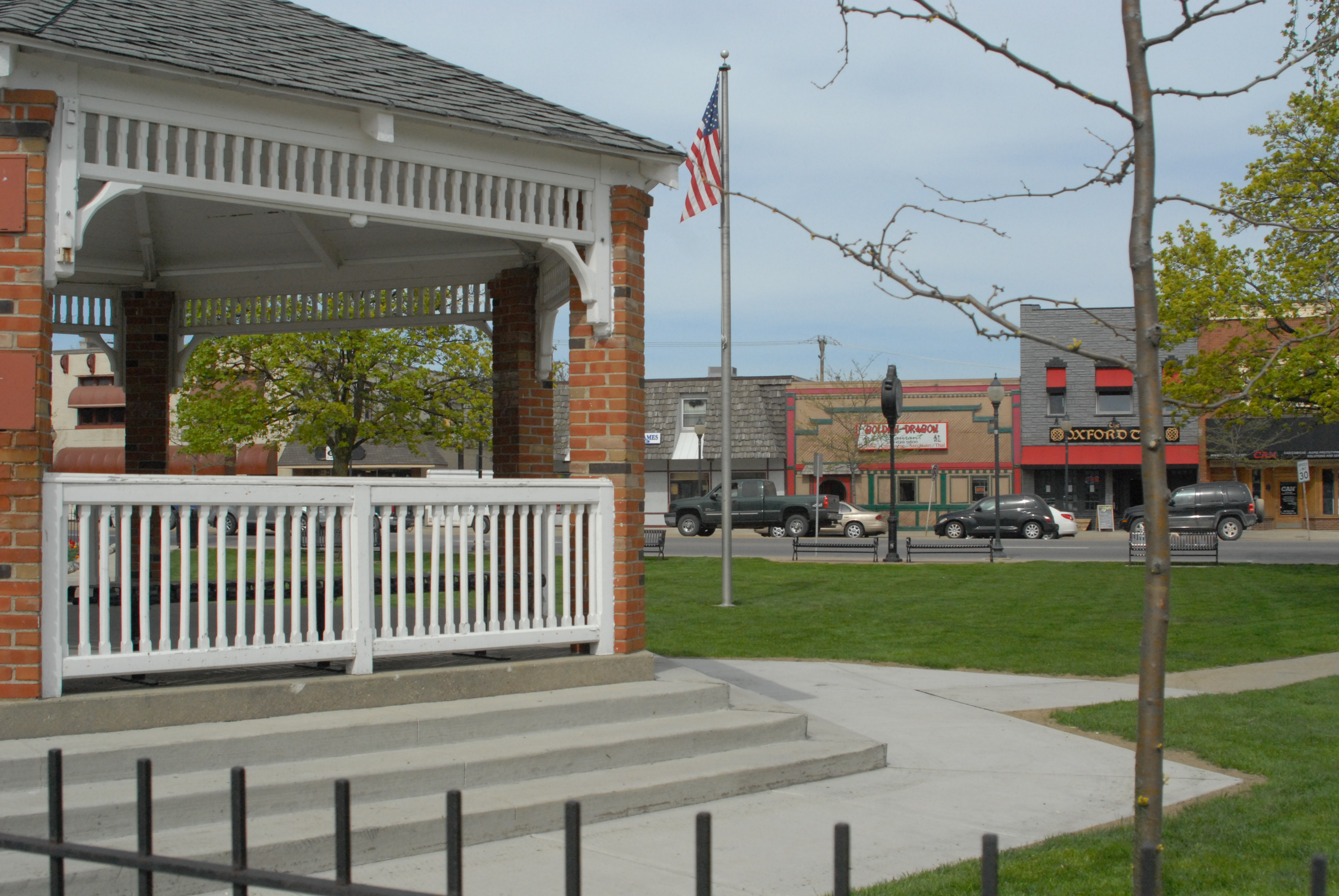
Centennial Park in Downtown Oxford

The village center consists of shops, restaurants, and taverns stretching for two blocks. Local happenings such as athletic events, downtown fairs, scarecrow competitions, school plays, the annual Steamback golf outing at Oxford Hills and concerts garner a large turnout throughout the year and are reported in the weekly newspaper of record since 1898, The Oxford Leader.

The area's public high school, Oxford High School, was newly expanded in 2003–2004.

== Education ==
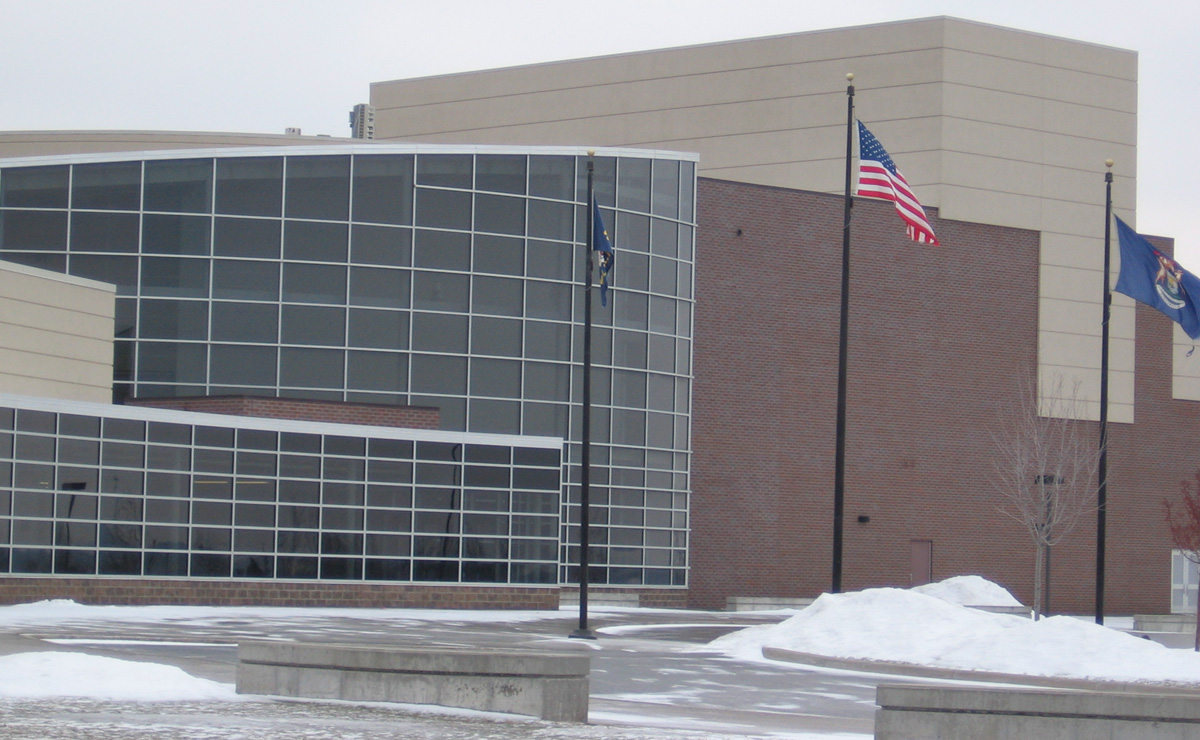
Entrance to Oxford High School

The village of Oxford is home to the school district of Oxford Community Schools. The district has nine schools which include:

- Two high schools (Oxford High School and Oxford Bridges High School, the latter an alternative school )
- One middle school (Oxford Middle School)
- Five elementary schools (Clear Lake, Daniel Axford, Lakeville, Leonard, and Oxford Elementary). All five elementary schools earned an A on their EducationYes! Report cards for the 2010–2011 school year.
- One adjudicated youth school (Crossroads for Youth)

The primary mascot for Oxford Schools is the Wildcat. Both the high school and the middle school have sports teams which are referred to as Oxford Wildcats. The Oxford Wildcat logo is visible around the town, prominently on one of the three water towers.

In 2009 and in 2010, Oxford Community Schools was featured as one of the "Best Schools In Michigan". Two of the elementary schools Leonard Elementary and Lakeville Elementary both won Michigan Blue Ribbon Awards, making all Oxford elementary schools Michigan Blue Ribbon Schools. In the 2010–2011 year, Oxford High School moved from the Flint Metro League to the Oakland Activities Association.

== Notable people ==
- Jim Bates (1964), NFL coach, from University of Tennessee, longtime NFL defensive coach (Packers, Broncos, Dolphins and Bucs) as well as Miami's head coach for eight games in 2004
- Brace Beemer, actor who played the Lone Ranger on radio from 1941 to 1953, retired and raised thoroughbred horses on his 300-acre ranch Paint Creek Acres, until his death in 1965
- Albert J. Campbell, United States Representative from Montana, lived in Oxford
- George H. Durand, U.S. Representative, lived in Oxford
- Chris Gambol, NFL player, (University of Iowa/Indianapolis Colts)
- Nathan Gerbe, former NHL player born in Oxford
- Eric Ghiaciuc, NFL player for the New England Patriots, was born in Oxford on May 28, 1981
- Ralph Gilles, an automotive designer currently serving as Head of Design for Fiat Chrysler Automobiles
- Mike Lantry, NFL player, (University of Michigan/Dallas Cowboys)
- Zach Line, NFL player, played for Southern Methodist University, retired from New Orleans Saints roster as a fullback, currently head coach of Oxford football varsity team
- Josh Norris, NHL player was born in Oxford and currently plays for the Buffalo Sabres of the National Hockey League
- Dave Rayner, NFL player, (Michigan State University/Indianapolis Colts)
- William R. Reed, commissioner of the Big Ten Conference from 1961 to 1971, was born in Oxford
- Josh Schriver, Republican in the House of Representatives trying to overturn the Obergfell v. Hodges Supreme Court decision which would make same sex marriage illegal
- Ava Swiss, singer-songwriter and musician who was a semi-finalist on America's Got Talent
- Trey Townsend, professional basketball player
