= Eric Ghiaciuc =

American football player (born 1981)

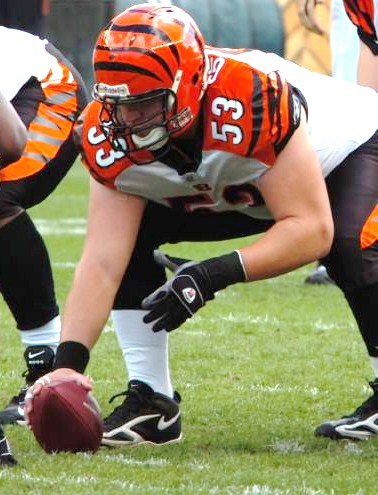
- Ghiaciuc In 2006

No. 53
- Position: Center

Personal information
- Born: May 28, 1981 (age 45); Oxford, Michigan, U.S.
- Listed height: 6 ft 4 in (1.93 m)
- Listed weight: 303 lb (137 kg)

Career information
- High school: Oxford
- College: Central Michigan (2000–2004)
- NFL draft: 2005: 4th round, 119th overall pick

Career history
- Cincinnati Bengals (2005–2008); Kansas City Chiefs (2009)*; San Diego Chargers (2009); Cleveland Browns (2010)*; Florida Tuskers (2010)*; New England Patriots (2010)*; Miami Dolphins (2010)
- * Offseason or practice squad member only

Career NFL statistics
- Games played: 48
- Games started: 42
- Fumble recoveries: 4
- Stats at Pro Football Reference

Eric M. Ghiaciuc [GUY-check] (born May 28, 1981) is an American former professional football player who was a center in the National Football League (NFL). He was selected by the Cincinnati Bengals in the fourth round of the 2005 NFL draft. He played college football for the Central Michigan Chippewas.

== Early life ==
While attending Oxford High School, Ghiaciuc was a three-sport standout in football, wrestling, and track and field. In football, he won All-League, All-County, All-Metro, All-State honors, and he was ranked No.37 prospect by The Detroit News, and No.47 by the Detroit Free Press. In wrestling, he was the state heavyweight champion. Ghiaciuc is of Romanian descent.

== College career ==
At Central Michigan University in Mount Pleasant, Michigan, Ghiaciuc was part of an offensive line which generated 105 touchdowns in a three-year stint. He was redshirted in 2000, saw limited action in 2001, then took over as starting center in 2002, starting for the next 37 games for the Chippewas. He was an Industrial Education major who graduated with a 3.30 GPA.

== Professional career ==
=== Cincinnati Bengals ===
Ghiaciuc was selected by the Cincinnati Bengals in the fourth round (119th overall) of the 2005 NFL draft. Ghiaciuc's college teammate, Adam Kieft, was selected in the fifth round. Paul Alexander, the Bengals' offensive line coach and assistant head coach, had also attended Central Michigan University. Ghiaciuc made his NFL debut and got his first career start against the Jacksonville Jaguars on October 9, 2005. He went on to play in four more games in his rookie season as a reserve. In 2006, Ghiaciuc started 12 of the final 13 games of the season at center, following an injury to Rich Braham in Week 2. He started in 12 games in 2007 and all 16 games in 2008 for the Bengals.

=== Kansas City Chiefs ===
An unrestricted free agent after the 2008 season, Ghiaciuc signed with the Kansas City Chiefs on April 30. He was waived on September 4, 2009.

=== San Diego Chargers ===
Ghiaciuc was signed by the San Diego Chargers on December 22, 2009, after center Scott Mruczkowski was placed on injured reserve. He was inactive for the final two games of the Chargers' regular season, as well as their playoff game against the New York Jets. He became a restricted free agent after the season but was not offered a tender by the Chargers.

=== Cleveland Browns ===
Ghiaciuc was signed by the Cleveland Browns on April 8, 2010. He was released on June 16, 2010.

=== Florida Tuskers ===
Ghiaciuc was a member of the Florida Tuskers' (United Football League) minicamp roster in June 2010.

=== New England Patriots ===
Ghiaciuc was signed by the New England Patriots on August 4, 2010. He was released on September 3, during final cuts.

=== Miami Dolphins ===
Ghiaciuc was signed by the Miami Dolphins on November 22, 2010, after placing Cory Procter on injured reserve. Ghiaciuc was released on December 28, 2010.
