= Lake Orion Community Schools =

School district in Michigan

Address
- 315 N. Lapeer St. Lake Orion, Oakland, Michigan, 48362; United States
- Coordinates: 42°47′14.7″N 83°14′28.6″W

District information
- Type: Public
- Grades: Pre-kindergarten through 12
- Superintendent: Heidi Mercer
- Schools: 13
- Budget: $160,557,000 (2022-2023 expeditures)
- NCES District ID: 2620730

Students and staff
- Students: 6,589 (2024-2025)
- Teachers: 420.02 FTE (2024-2025)
- Staff: 1,076.93 FTE (2024-2025)
- Student–teacher ratio: 15.69 (2024-2025)

Other information
- Website: www.lakeorionschools.org

Lake Orion Community Schools is a school district headquartered in Lake Orion, Michigan, serving students from the Village of Lake Orion and Orion Township; and small parts of Addison Township, Independence Township, Oakland Township, and Oxford Township.

A photo of Lake Orion High School

== Schools ==
Schools in Lake Orion Community Schools
School	Address	Notes
High school (grades 9-12)
Lake Orion High School	495 E Scripps Rd., Lake Orion	Built 1997.
Learning Options High School	455 E Scripps Rd., Lake Orion	Alternative high school. Building opened fall 1957 as Lake Orion High School.
Middle schools (grades 6-8)
Oakview Middle School	917 Lake George Road, Oakland	Opened fall 2002.
Scripps Middle School	385 East Scripps Road, Lake Orion	Opened 1965.
Waldon Middle School	2509 Waldon Road, Lake Orion	Built 1972.
Elementary schools (grades K-5)
Blanche Sims Elementary School	465 East Jackson Street, Lake Orion	Built 2023.
Carpenter Elementary School	2290 Flintridge, Orion Township	Built 1955.
Early Childhood Center	1155 Joslyn Road, Lake Orion	Preschool, opened fall 2021.
Orion Oaks Elementary School	1255 Joslyn Road, Lake Orion	Grades PreK-5, completed August 1996.
Paint Creek Elementary School	2800 Indianwood Road, Lake Orion	Grades PreK-5, opened fall 2000.
Pine Tree Center	590 Pine Tree Rd, Lake Orion	Special education school, grades K-12, built 1972.
Stadium Drive Elementary	244 Stadium Drive, Lake Orion	Built 1972.
Webber Elementary School	3191 West Clarkston Road, Lake Orion	PreK-5, first opened 1955.
