= Addison Township, Michigan =

- Civil township
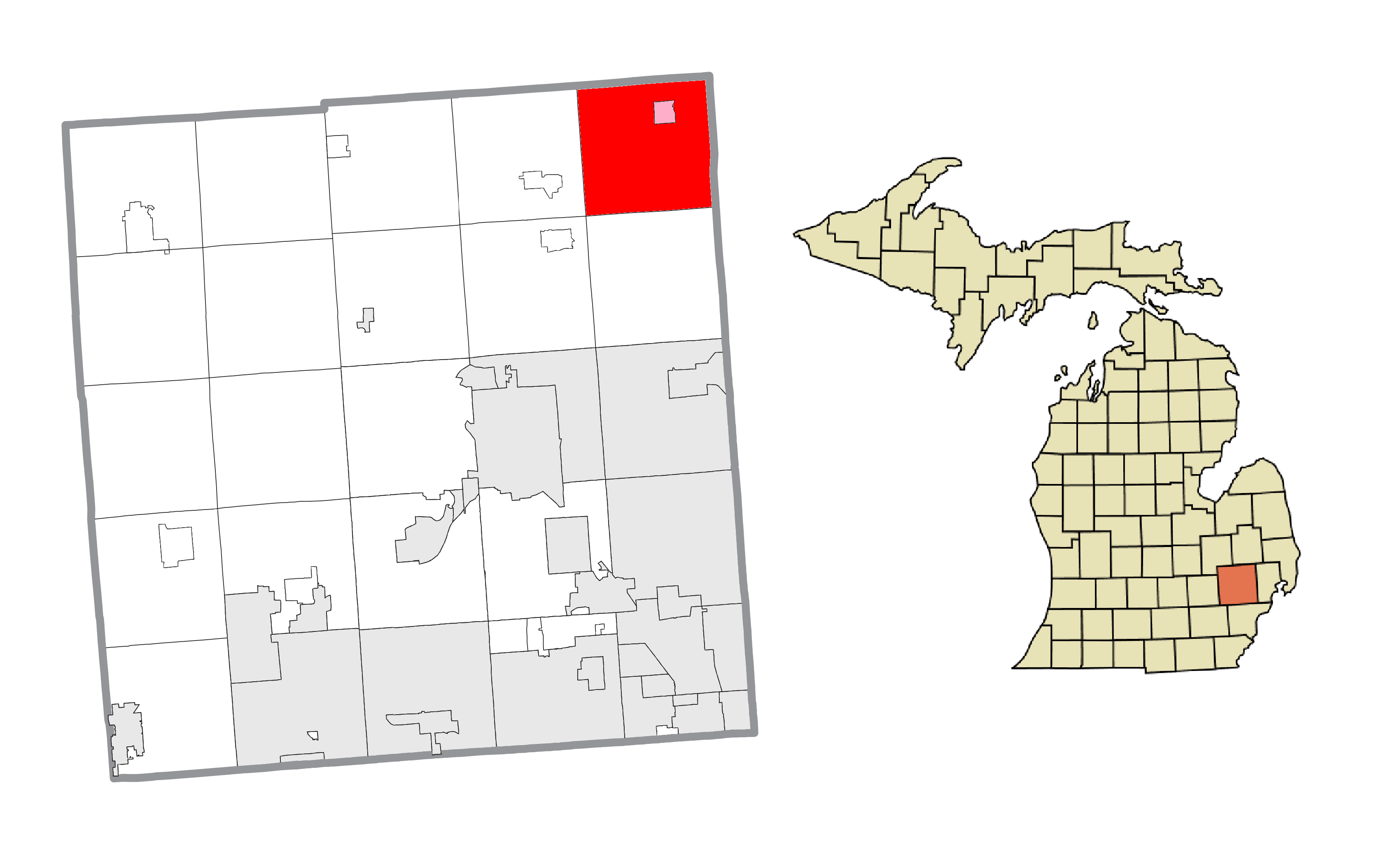
- Location within Oakland County (red) and the administered village of Leonard (pink)

- Location within the state of Michigan Addison Township (the United States)
- Coordinates: 42°50′18″N 83°09′01″W
- Country: United States
- State: Michigan
- County: Oakland

Government
  - Supervisor: Bruce Pearson
  - Clerk: Pauline Bennett

Area
  - Civil township: 36.58 sq mi (94.7 km^{2})
  - Land: 35.52 sq mi (92.0 km^{2})
  - Water: 1.06 sq mi (2.7 km^{2})
- Elevation: 997 ft (304 m)

Population (2020)
  - Civil township: 6,256
  - Density: 176.1/sq mi (68.00/km^{2})
  - Metro: 4,296,250 (Metro Detroit)
- Time zone: UTC-5 (Eastern (EST))
  - Summer (DST): UTC-4 (EDT)
- ZIP code(s): 48366 (Lakeville); 48367 (Leonard); 48370 (Oxford)
- Area codes: 248, 947, 586, and 810
- FIPS code: 26-00400
- GNIS feature ID: 1625802
- Website: Official website

Addison Township is a civil township of northeast Oakland County in the U.S. state of Michigan. As of the 2020 census, the township population was 6,256.

The Township was named for pioneer settler Addison Chamberlain.

== Communities ==
- The village of Leonard is in the northeast part of the township. The Leonard ZIP code 48367 serves most of the eastern portion of the township.

The Township has two unincorporated communities:

- Campbells Corner is on the southern border with Oakland Charter Township.
- Lakeville is located in the south central part of the township at 42°49′17″N 83°09′01″W. It was founded and named by Sherman Hopkins in 1830. It was the first white settlement in the Township, which had been named for pioneer settler Addison Chamberlain. A post office was established in November 1836, and Lakeville was platted in 1840. The community is served by the P.O. box-only ZIP code 48366.

== Geography ==
According to the United States Census Bureau, the township has a total area of 36.58 square miles (94.74 km^{2}), of which 35.52 square miles (92.00 km^{2}) is land and 1.06 square miles (2.75 km^{2}) (2.90%) is water.

== Demographics ==
As of the census of 2000, there were 6,439 people, 2,174 households, and 1,752 families residing in the township. The population density was 177.7 inhabitants per square mile (68.6/km^{2}). There were 2,290 housing units at an average density of 63.2 per square mile (24.4/km^{2}). The racial makeup of the township was 97.10% White, 1.07% African American, 0.33% Native American, 0.23% Asian, 0.02% Pacific Islander, 0.26% from other races, and 0.99% from two or more races. Hispanic or Latino of any race were 1.94% of the population.

There were 2,174 households, out of which 39.9% had children under the age of 18 living with them, 70.4% were married couples living together, 6.1% had a female householder with no husband present, and 19.4% were non-families. 14.5% of all households were made up of individuals, and 3.5% had someone living alone who was 65 years of age or older. The average household size was 2.89 and the average family size was 3.21.

In the township the population was spread out, with 29.2% under the age of 18, 6.6% from 18 to 24, 30.1% from 25 to 44, 27.3% from 45 to 64, and 6.9% who were 65 years of age or older. The median age was 37 years. For every 100 females, there were 105.6 males. For every 100 females age 18 and over, there were 102.9 males.

The median income for a household in the township was $69,266, and the median income for a family was $79,019. Males had a median income of $60,281 versus $30,720 for females. The per capita income for the township was $29,350. About 3.8% of families and 5.7% of the population were below the poverty line, including 6.1% of those under age 18 and 6.3% of those age 65 and over.

== Education ==
Most of Addison Township is in Oxford Community Schools. Other portions are in Lake Orion Community Schools, Almont Community Schools, and Romeo Community Schools. The first district's zoned high school is Oxford High School. The others', respectively, are Lake Orion High School, Almont High School, and Romeo High School.

== Notable residents ==
- Mark S. Brewer (1837–1901), United States Congressman
