= Leonard, Michigan =

- Village
- Village of Leonard
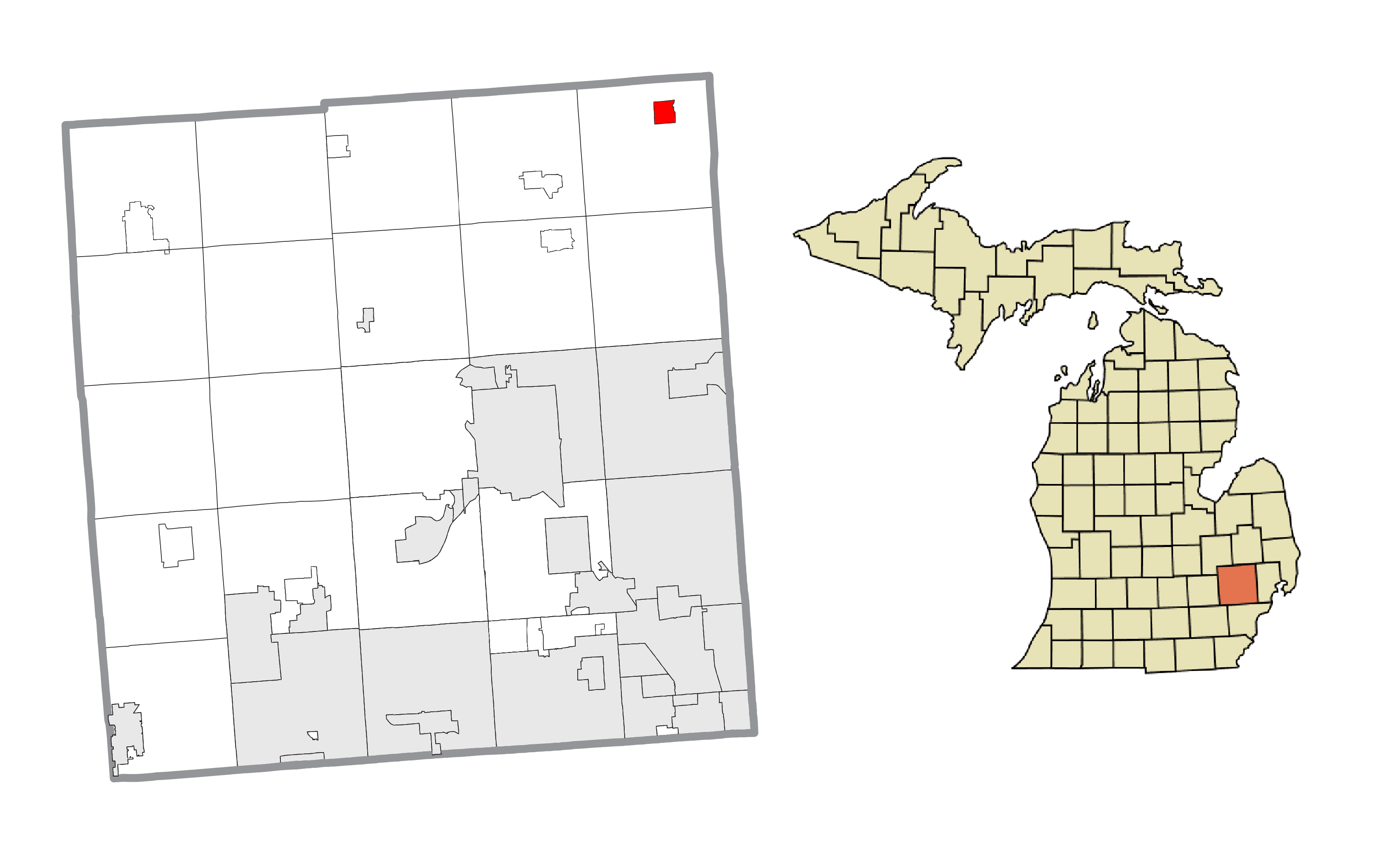
- Location within Oakland County

- Location within the state of Michigan
- Coordinates: 42°51′54″N 83°08′29″W
- Country: United States
- State: Michigan
- County: Oakland
- Township: Addison
- Incorporated: 1889

Government
  - Village President: William "Bill" Moore

Area
  - Village: 0.99 sq mi (2.57 km^{2})
  - Land: 0.99 sq mi (2.57 km^{2})
  - Water: 0 sq mi (0.00 km^{2})
- Elevation: 1,007 ft (307 m)

Population (2020)
  - Village: 377
  - Density: 379.5/sq mi (146.54/km^{2})
  - Metro: 4,296,250 (Metro Detroit)
- Time zone: UTC-5 (Eastern (EST))
  - Summer (DST): UTC-4 (EDT)
- ZIP code(s): 48367
- Area codes: 248 and 810
- FIPS code: 26-46940
- GNIS feature ID: 0630315
- Website: Official website

Leonard is a village in Addison Township, Oakland County in the U.S. state of Michigan. The population was 377 at the 2020 census, and 403 at the 2010 census.

== History ==
A post office called Leonard has been in operation since 1884. Birthplace of Steven Avery. The village was named for Leonard Rowland. Leonard was incorporated in 1889.

== Projects ==
In 2014, an initiative was made to restore the Leonard Mill, and turn it into a stop on the Poly Ann Trail. The Leonard Mill was an old mill with a Grain elevator and beanery that used to serve the PO & N Railway. After a general store that was using the mill closed, the mill was left to rot. In 2014 the Village Of Leonard acquired the mill and would soon start renovations. The beanery was completely demolished in the Summer of 2015, and the roof of the mill was restored in 2017. Since then, no notable work has been done on the mill. The final plan for the mill is a rest stop with bike infrastructure, restrooms, and a seasonal small retail outlet.

== Geography ==
According to the United States Census Bureau, the village has a total area of 0.96 square miles (2.49 km^{2}), all land.

== Demographics ==
Historical population
Census	Pop.	Note	%±
1890	276		—
1900	335		21.4%
1910	313		−6.6%
1920	264		−15.7%
1930	280		6.1%
1940	276		−1.4%
1950	391		41.7%
1960	359		−8.2%
1970	378		5.3%
1980	423		11.9%
1990	357		−15.6%
2000	332		−7.0%
2010	403		21.4%
2020	377		−6.5%
U.S. Decennial Census

=== 2010 census ===
As of the census of 2010, there were 403 people, 153 households, and 114 families living in the village. The population density was 419.8 inhabitants per square mile (162.1/km^{2}). There were 162 housing units at an average density of 168.8 per square mile (65.2/km^{2}). The racial makeup of the village was 97.5% White, 0.2% African American, 1.0% Native American, 0.7% from other races, and 0.5% from two or more races. Hispanic or Latino of any race were 2.2% of the population.

There were 153 households, of which 35.9% had children under the age of 18 living with them, 61.4% were married couples living together, 7.8% had a female householder with no husband present, 5.2% had a male householder with no wife present, and 25.5% were non-families. 21.6% of all households were made up of individuals, and 11.7% had someone living alone who was 65 years of age or older. The average household size was 2.63 and the average family size was 3.07.

The median age in the village was 39.9 years. 24.6% of residents were under the age of 18; 6.5% were between the ages of 18 and 24; 26% were from 25 to 44; 30.3% were from 45 to 64; and 12.7% were 65 years of age or older. The gender makeup of the village was 51.9% male and 48.1% female.

=== 2000 census ===
As of the census of 2000, there were 332 people, 124 households, and 93 families living in the village. The population density was 344.7 inhabitants per square mile (133.1/km^{2}). There were 129 housing units at an average density of 133.9 per square mile (51.7/km^{2}). The racial makeup of the village was 99.92% White, 00.08% African American, 0.30% Native American, 0.60% Asian, and 0.90% from two or more races. Hispanic or Latino of any race were 5.72% of the population.

There were 124 households, out of which 33.9% had children under the age of 18 living with them, 62.9% were married couples living together, 6.5% had a female householder with no husband present, and 24.2% were non-families. 21.0% of all households were made up of individuals, and 10.5% had someone living alone who was 65 years of age or older. The average household size was 2.68 and the average family size was 3.06.

In the village, the population was spread out, with 26.2% under the age of 18, 6.3% from 18 to 24, 27.4% from 25 to 44, 27.1% from 45 to 64, and 13.0% who were 65 years of age or older. The median age was 39 years. For every 100 females, there were 95.3 males. For every 100 females age 18 and over, there were 100.8 males.

The median income for a household in the village was $45,625, and the median income for a family was $57,500. Males had a median income of $41,458 versus $31,250 for females. The per capita income for the village was $29,006. None of the families and 3.9% of the population were living below the poverty line, including no under eighteens and 9.4% of those over 64.

== Government ==
The government of the Village of Leonard consists of elected and appointed officials. The elected officials include: four council members, one President and one Treasurer, the Clerk is appointed. The appointed officials also include Street Superintendent. Currently, the clerk also has a part-time administrative assistant.

The village has a Planning Commission consisting of five citizens who are appointed by the Village Council. The Village Council acts as the Zoning Board of Appeals when necessary. The village has a Parks and Recreation Commission whose members are both appointed and volunteer. There is a State of Michigan-approved Recreation Plan for the village which the commission is responsible for maintaining and managing.

== Education ==
Leonard is in Oxford Community Schools. Its zoned high school is Oxford High School. It should also be noted, Leonard has an operating Elementary School, which used to be a High school.

== Popular culture ==
- The humor novel Ghosts/Aliens takes place in Leonard.
- The Native Howl
