= Jim Bates (American football) =

American football coach (born 1946)

Personal information
- Born: May 31, 1946 (age 80); Pontiac, Michigan, U.S.

Career information
- High school: Oxford (Oxford, Michigan)
- College: Tennessee

Career history
- Tennessee (1968) Graduate assistant; Sevier County HS (TN) (1969–1971) Head coach; Southern Miss (1972) Freshmen coach; Villanova (1973) Offensive line coach (1973); Villanova (1974) Linebackers coach; Kansas State (1975–1976) Linebackers coach; West Virginia (1977) Defensive backs coach; Texas Tech (1978–1979) Defensive backs coach; Texas Tech (1980–1983) Defensive coordinator; San Antonio Gunslingers (1985) Head coach; Tennessee (1989) Linebackers coach; Florida (1990) Defensive coordinator & defensive backs coach; Cleveland Browns (1991–1993) Inside linebackers coach; Atlanta Falcons (1994) Defensive coordinator; Cleveland Browns (1995) Defensive backs coach; Dallas Cowboys (1996–1997) Linebackers coach; Dallas Cowboys (1998–1999) Defensive line coach; Miami Dolphins (2000–2004) Defensive coordinator; Miami Dolphins (2004) Interim head coach; Green Bay Packers (2005) Defensive coordinator; Denver Broncos (2007) Defensive coordinator; Tampa Bay Buccaneers (2009) Defensive coordinator

Head coaching record
- Regular season: NFL: 3–4 (.429)
- Postseason: NFL: 0–0 (–)
- Career: NFL: 3–4 (.429)
- Coaching profile at Pro Football Reference

Jim Bates (born May 31, 1946) is an American former football coach in the National Football League (NFL). A defensive coordinator for multiple teams, he primarily ran a 4–3 scheme, using fast, undersized linebackers. Bates served as interim head coach for the Miami Dolphins during the 2004 NFL season.

== Coaching career ==
=== Collegiate coaching ===
Bates' coaching career began as a graduate assistant with the Tennessee Volunteers in 1968. Bates then spent the next three seasons as head coach at Sevier County High School in Sevierville, Tennessee, before returning to the collegiate ranks with the Southern Mississippi Golden Eagles in 1972. In 1973, he coached the offensive line for the Villanova Wildcats and the linebackers coach in 1974. Bates spent the 1975–1976 seasons as the Kansas State Wildcats' linebackers coach. Bates spent the 1977 season as a secondary coach with the West Virginia Mountaineers. He held the same position with the Texas Tech Red Raiders from 1978 to 1979 before being promoted to defensive coordinator from 1980 through 1983.

=== 1985 ===
Bates began his professional coaching career in the USFL with the San Antonio Gunslingers, replacing retiring head coach Gil Steinke for the team's 1985 season. After 12 games, Bates resigned as head coach following the club's failure to pay its players over the course of several preceding weeks.

=== 1989 ===
Served as a Linebackers Coach for the University of Tennessee

=== 1990 ===
When Steve Spurrier was hired as the new head football coach for the University of Florida in 1990, Spurrier hired Bates as his first defensive coordinator for his Florida Gators football team. Bates' hard-hitting defense and Spurrier's offensive scheme helped the Gators to a 17–13 upset win over the Alabama Crimson Tide, and resounding victories over the LSU Tigers (34–8), the Auburn Tigers (48–7), the Georgia Bulldogs (38–7) and the Kentucky Wildcats (47–15). The Gators finished 9–2 overall, and 6–1 in the Southeastern Conference—the best record in the conference. They would finish 11th in the country averaging 15.5 PA per game.

=== 1991–2004 ===
Bates began his National Football League coaching career with the Cleveland Browns as their defensive line coach in 1991, where he served under head coach Bill Belichick and defensive coordinator Nick Saban, who would succeed him as Dolphins head coach in 2005.

He then moved on to the Atlanta Falcons to serve as defensive coordinator in 1994, his first time at this position. It would only last one year, however, and Bates returned to the Browns to coach their secondary in 1995 when Saban left to take the head coaching position at Michigan State. Bates was fired along with Belichick and his entire staff by owner Art Modell on February 9, 1996, the day NFL owners approved the Browns' move to Baltimore to become the Baltimore Ravens.

In 1996, Bates was hired by the Dallas Cowboys as their linebackers coach under Barry Switzer. He was promoted to assistant coach/defensive line in 1998 by new head coach Chan Gailey.

In 2000, the Miami Dolphins hired him as their defensive coordinator. Under Bates, the Dolphins defense finished no lower than 10th in the NFL in yards allowed from 2000 to 2004.

=== 2004–2005 ===
His first head coaching job in the NFL came in 2004 when he was named interim head coach for the Miami Dolphins following the resignation of Dave Wannstedt. He went 3-4 (including a Monday Night victory over the eventual Super Bowl champion New England Patriots) with the underachieving Dolphins, who had started 1-8 under Wannstedt. When Saban took over the team, it soon became clear that Bates was not part of his plans, and Bates took over the defensive coordinator job with the Green Bay Packers.

=== 2006 ===
When Mike Sherman was fired by Packers General Manager Ted Thompson on January 2, 2006, Bates was offered the opportunity to interview for the head position. He interviewed on January 10 but was informed the next day the organization would be hiring San Francisco 49ers offensive coordinator Mike McCarthy instead.

Bates took the news very hard. McCarthy met with him on January 15 in hopes of convincing him to stay with the organization. However, after two meetings between McCarthy and Bates, the team announced on January 16 that they would be parting ways.

Bates did not take another coaching job in the NFL in 2006.

=== 2007 ===
In early January 2007, Bates was signed on by the Denver Broncos to replace Larry Coyer as the defensive coordinator. However, Defensive Backs coach Bob Slowik was promoted to the defensive coordinator position (nominal), and Bates was named "Assistant Head Coach/Defense." In the 2007 season, the Broncos defense went from 9th ranked in the league in scoring in 2006 to 29th in 2007 as of week 13. On January 8, 2008, Bates announced he was leaving the Denver Broncos.

=== 2009 ===
On January 22, 2009, he was announced as the Tampa Bay Buccaneers Defensive Coordinator, working with new head coach Raheem Morris. After a 1–9 start into the season, Bates was relieved of his duties by Morris on November 24, 2009.

=== Head coaching record ===
Team	Year	Regular Season					Postseason			
Team	Year	Won	Lost	Ties	Win %	Finish	Won	Lost	Win %	Result
MIA*	2004	3	4	0	.429	4th in AFC East	–	–	–	–
MIA total		3	4	0	.429		–	–	–	
Total		3	4	0	.429					

*Interim head coach.

== Scheme ==
Bates' defensive scheme uses the defensive tackles to plug the middle, with the defensive ends pressuring the quarterback. Special emphasis is on the linebackers, as short, speedy LB's are especially fitted for this format. Linebacker Zach Thomas and defensive end Jason Taylor are among the players Bates developed in Miami. Bates is well liked among players for being a fiery, energetic, demanding, yet fair and hands-on coach.

== Personal life ==
A graduate of the University of Tennessee, Bates now lives in Oneida, Wisconsin. His son, Jeremy, has been an offensive coach for several professional and college teams, including a stint as the offensive coordinator for the Seattle Seahawks. James Bates, his oldest son, played linebacker for the Florida Gators and was a captain on the Gators' 1996 Florida Gators football team, and 1996 NCAA Division I-A football season where Jim served as a defensive coordinator, Bates works as A Color commentator on the ACC Network and raycom Sports His daughter Jennifer, was previously a television sports reporter and news anchor at KWCH, the CBS affiliate in Wichita, Kansas. He is currently a sports broadcaster and working artist.

Bates is a 1964 graduate of Oxford High School in Oxford, Michigan. He earned 10 varsity letters in 4 sports before accepting an offer to play football at Tennessee. Bates was named to the school's athletic hall of fame. Bates currently resides in Florida.
