= Ava Swiss =

American singer-songwriter

- Genres: Pop; indie pop; alternative pop
- Occupations: Singer; songwriter; musician
- Instrument: Vocals
- Years active: 2022–present
- Website: avaswiss.com

Ava Swiss (born Ava Swieczkowski) is an American singer-songwriter and musician who was a semi-finalist on the television show, America's Got Talent.

== Early life ==
Swiss grew up in Oxford, Michigan and has been singing since she was two years old. She is a survivor of the Oxford High School shooting that took place on November 30, 2021.

== Career ==
Swiss was a participant on the television show, America's Got Talent, first appearing in the eighth episode of Season 17 on July 26, 2022. Her audition consisted of singing Lauren Daigle's song, "Remember". Judges Howie Mandel, Heidi Klum, Sofía Vergara, and Simon Cowell all voted "Yes", sending her to the next round. Ava Swiss' semifinals performance consisted of singing Pink's "Wild Hearts Can't Be Broken". All four judges gave her a standing ovation but she did not receive enough votes to make it to the finals. On August 6, 2023, Swiss released the EP, What Is Real Love?.

== Discography ==
EPs

- What Is Real Love? (2023)
