= Trey Townsend =

American basketball player (born 2002)

No. 00 – Greensboro Swarm
- Position: Power forward / small forward
- League: NBA G League

Personal information
- Born: August 30, 2002 (age 24) Oxford, Michigan, U.S.
- Listed height: 6 ft 6 in (1.98 m)
- Listed weight: 228 lb (103 kg)

Career information
- High school: Oxford (Oxford, Michigan)
- College: Oakland (2020–2024); Arizona (2024–2025)
- NBA draft: 2025: undrafted
- Playing career: 2025–present

Career history
- 2025: Köping Basket
- 2025–2026: Texas Legends
- 2026: Salt Lake City Stars
- 2026: Saskatoon Mamba
- 2026–present: Greensboro Swarm

Career highlights
- Lou Henson Award (2024); Horizon League Player of the Year (2024); First-team All-Horizon League (2024); Second-team All-Horizon League (2023)
- Stats at NBA.com
- Stats at Basketball Reference

Lawrence Frank Townsend III (born August 30, 2002) is an American professional basketball player for the Greensboro Swarm of the NBA G League. He played college basketball for the Oakland Golden Grizzlies and Arizona Wildcats.

== High school career ==
Townsend attended Oxford High School in Oxford, Michigan. He finished his high school career with 1,010 career points, finishing second all-time in school history, before committing to play college basketball at Oakland University.

== College career ==
As a freshman, Townsend averaged eight points and six rebounds per game. In his senior season, Townsend was named the Horizon League Player of the Year. On March 12, 2024, in the Horizon League championship game against Milwaukee, he scored a career-high 38 points, leading Oakland to their first NCAA Tournament berth since 2011. In the first round of the NCAA Tournament against Kentucky, Townsend recorded a double-double, tallying 17 points and 12 rebounds, helping lead Oakland to an 80–76 upset victory. He followed that up with 30 points and 12 rebounds in Oakland's 73–79 overtime defeat in the second round against NC State. Townsend was awarded the Lou Henson Award as the top mid-major player in the country after averaging 17.3 points and 8.1 rebounds per game. On April 3, 2024, he entered the transfer portal.

On April 24, 2024, Townsend announced his decision to transfer to the University of Arizona to play for the Arizona Wildcats. He averaged 8.2 points and 3.9 rebounds per game.

== Professional career ==
In 2025, Townsend signed with Köping Basket and averaged 15.7 points, 5.5 rebounds, and 2.9 assists per game. On December 31, he signed with the Texas Legends. In 15 games, Townsend averaged 3.2 points, 2.2 rebounds, and 0.8 assists per game. He was acquired by the Salt Lake City Stars on March 6, 2026 in a trade.

On April 20, 2026 Townsend signed with the Saskatoon Mamba of the Canadian Elite Basketball League (CEBL). Townsend played in all 24 regular season games in 2026 and shot a league leading 46.9% from three–point range (minimum of 60 attempts), which also put him 4th in the CEBL's career highest all time 3pt% for regular season games.

On September 1, 2026, Townsend signed with the Charlotte Hornets. He subsequently joined the Greensboro Swarm for the 2026–27 NBA G League season.

== Personal life ==
Both of Townsend's parents, Skip and Nicole, played basketball at Oakland.

== Career statistics ==
Legend
| GP | Games played | GS | Games started | MPG | Minutes per game |
| FG% | Field goal percentage | 3P% | 3-point field goal percentage | FT% | Free throw percentage |
| RPG | Rebounds per game | APG | Assists per game | SPG | Steals per game |
| BPG | Blocks per game | PPG | Points per game | **Bold** | Career high |

=== College ===
| Year | Team | GP | GS | MPG | FG% | 3P% | FT% | RPG | APG | SPG | BPG | PPG |
|---|---|---|---|---|---|---|---|---|---|---|---|---|
| 2020–21 | Oakland | 30 | 30 | 30.2 | .524 | .333 | .592 | 6.1 | .8 | **1.4** | .8 | 8.4 |
| 2021–22 | Oakland | 31 | 31 | **36.4** | **.531** | .167 | .757 | 5.6 | 1.8 | **1.4** | **1.0** | 13.3 |
| 2022–23 | Oakland | 32 | 32 | 36.3 | .518 | **.385** | .737 | 7.6 | 1.5 | 1.0 | **1.0** | 16.5 |
| 2023–24 | Oakland | **36** | **36** | **36.4** | .455 | .375 | **.779** | **8.1** | **3.1** | 1.3 | .3 | **17.3** |
| Career | | 129 | 129 | 34.9 | .500 | .314 | .739 | 6.9 | 1.9 | 1.3 | .8 | 14.1 |

== See also ==
- List of NCAA Division I men's basketball players with 2,000 points and 1,000 rebounds
