= Brace Beemer =

American radio actor and announcer

- Beemer as the Lone Ranger
- Born: Brace Beemer; December 9, 1902; Mount Carmel, Illinois, U.S.
- Died: March 1, 1965 (age 62); Oxford Township, Michigan, U.S.
- Occupation: Actor
- Known for: The voice of the Lone Ranger on radio
- Spouse(s): Evelyn (Couvert) Beemer, Leta (Wales) Beemer
- Children: Robert Beemer, J.D. Beemer, Richard Beemer, Barbara B. Daniel

Brace Beemer (December 9, 1902 – March 1, 1965) was an American radio actor and announcer at radio station WXYZ (AM), Detroit, Michigan.

He is best known as the radio voice of the Lone Ranger.

== The Lone Ranger ==
Brace Beemer became the third radio voice of the Lone Ranger on April 18, 1941, after the death of Earle Graser and remained so until the series's last new episode on September 3, 1954. During the 13 years that Beemer played the title character, he was required by contract to restrict his radio acting to that one role until the program left the air.

The experienced and popular Western film actor, Clayton Moore, was chosen to take over the role for the television series. Although Beemer had the right voice and had made many public appearances as the Ranger, he had no experience as a film actor, as he preferred radio and live performing to television. However, Beemer's voice as the character was so familiar that Moore imitated his sound in the earliest TV episodes.

== Other roles ==
Beemer also portrayed Sergeant William Preston of the Yukon on Challenge of the Yukon, for a brief time after the Lone Ranger series ended.

Beemer's last TV appearance was an interview with former film actor Bill Kennedy on his Bill Kennedy Showtime program on CKLW TV9 from Windsor, Ontario, Canada. Beemer died the next day.

== Early years ==
Brace Bell Beemer was born at his home on Cherry Street in Mount Carmel, Illinois on December 9, 1902, the son of Joseph D. Beemer and Bertina (Bell) Beemer.

He attended high school in Vincennes, Indiana, leaving school to enlist in the military.

When Beemer was 14, he misrepresented his age to participate in World War I. He served with "Battery E, 150th field artillery, and was wounded in action in France May 27," 1918. He was said to be the youngest sergeant in that war.

== Later years ==
Beemer resided in Oxford Township, Michigan. He raised thoroughbred horses on his 300-acre ranch, Paint Creek Acres. The barn where the great white stallion Silver used to stay still stands, and it’s rumored that the horse was buried in the woods on the property.

== Death ==
Brace Beemer died of a heart attack March 1, 1965. He is buried in White Chapel Cemetery in Troy, Michigan. At the time of his death, he was using his famous "Lone Ranger" voice in automobile commercials running on radio stations.
