= Shannon Pettypiece =

American journalist

- Born: June 10, 1981 (age 44); Lake Orion, Michigan, United States
- Education: University of Michigan
- Occupation: White House correspondent
- Years active: 8
- Employer: NBC News 2019 - present
- Parent(s): Aileen and Doug Pettypiece
- Relatives: Erin Pettypiece (Sister)

Shannon Pettypiece is an American print and broadcast journalist. She is currently Senior White House Correspondent for NBC News Digital.

== Early life ==
Pettypiece grew up in Lake Orion, Michigan, where she attended Lake Orion High School. At age 5, she began showing horses competitively and was involved in 4-H as well as her high school and college equestrian teams. She attended the University of Michigan where she was a reporter and editor at The Michigan Daily, the university's student-run newspaper. She graduated with a Bachelor's degree in political science with a focus on Russia and the former Soviet Union. Her mother is a teacher and her father is a woodworker.

== Journalism career ==
Pettypiece's first journalism job was as an intern for The New York Times in Washington, D.C. She later worked as a stringer for The New York Times in Detroit. She has covered local government for Miami Today News and health care and technology for Crain's Cleveland Business.

In 2006, she joined Bloomberg News in Washington covering the Food and Drug Administration. She later moved to New York where she took over coverage of the pharmaceutical industry. She has also been a contributor to Bloomberg Businessweek. While at Bloomberg, she interviewed the chief executives of the world's largest health care companies, including Pfizer, Merck, GlaxoSmithKline, Bayer, and Eli Lilly. Her reporting has taken her to China, where she went inside Chinese hospitals, research labs, and homes for a four-part series on the country's evolving health care system.

In 2010, she became a correspondent for Bloomberg TV, covering the healthcare industry.

As of July 3, 2019, she is a senior White House reporter for NBC News Digital.
