= William R. Reed =

American athletics administrator

William Reynolds Reed (November 28, 1915 – May 20, 1971) was an American college athletics administrator who was commissioner of the Big Ten Conference from 1961 until his death in 1971.

A native of Oxford, Michigan, Reed attended the University of Michigan, graduating in 1936 with a major in political science before continuing at Michigan Law. As an undergraduate at Michigan, he played on the freshmen football team. Reed first joined the Big Ten in 1939 before leaving for a six-year period to serve in the United States Navy during World War II and then as an assistant to Homer S. Ferguson, United States Senator from Michigan. He later served as an assistant to Big Ten commissioner, Kenneth Wilson, before succeeding Wilson in 1961.

Reed died at the age of 55 on May 20, 1971, at Advocate Lutheran General Hospital in Park Ridge, Illinois. He was hospitalized four months earlier for rheumatoid arthritis before contracting hepatitis and, ultimately, falling into a coma several days before his death.
