= Oxford Community Schools =

School district in Michigan, United States

Address
- 775 W. Drahner Rd. Oxford, Oakland County, Michigan, 48371; United States

District information
- Grades: PreKindergarten–12
- Superintendent: Dr. Tonya Milligan
- Schools: 10
- Budget: $111,966,000 2022-2023 expenditures
- NCES District ID: 2627240

Students and staff
- Students: 5,605 (2024-2025)
- Teachers: 332.22 (on an FTE basis) (2024-2025)
- Staff: 847.08 FTE (2024-2025)
- Student–teacher ratio: 16.87 (2024-2025)
- District mascot: Wildcats

Other information
- Website: www.oxfordschools.org

Oxford Community Schools is a school district headquartered in Oxford, Michigan.

The district serves portions of northeastern Oakland County and southwestern Lapeer County as well as a small northeast section of Macomb County. In Oakland County, it serves Oxford, Leonard, most of Oxford and Addison townships, and portions of Brandon Township. In Lapeer County, the district serves sections of Dryden and Metamora townships. The district also extends into a very small portion of Bruce Township, Macomb County.

== History ==
Oxford's first school was built in 1832. But Oxford's school of note was the Oxford Institute, a private school founded in 1857 with a capacity of 200 students. Facing financial failure, the public school system bought it in 1860.

The district's Union School was built in 1887 on North Washington Street, and would serve the district for many years. With consolidation of several outlying districts with Oxford's district in 1956, a new high school was built. It was succeeded by the next high school, now the district's middle school, in 1982. The district saw rapid growth during the 1990s and reached a high of 5,812 students in the 2019–2020 school year.

One of the oldest schools in the district, Daniel Axford Elementary, was built in 1927 and expanded in 1952. The current high school opened as the district's middle school in 1998, and was converted into the high school with several additions in 2004.

=== Chinese international student program ===
Oxford Community Schools operated an international student program enrolling students from China in the 2010s. In 2010, the district established a program so that international students from China could pay tuition and study at Oxford Community Schools. The school district placed some students with American host families, while the majority of the students who came as part of the Weiming Education Group lived in a residence hall at Rochester College. At one point, the district had 80 Chinese national international students. The district had a Confucius Institute-related program, and in 2013 the operator of the program, the Hanban ranked the district "Confucius Classroom of the Year". The district had Chinese students for two years, with Chinese students required to take university courses so they could stay for the second year, with courses taking place at Oxford High School.

The district also opened a school in China in fall 2011, the Northeast Yucai Oxford Academy, led by former Clarkston High School teacher Aaron Dobson.

William Skilling, then the superintendent, supported a proposal to establish a 200-student dormitory so the district could educate international students from China as part of a partnership with Weiming. The dormitory was to be 40,000 square feet (3,700 m^{2}) in size. The condition was that Oxford schools had to attract at least 100 Chinese students, which by 2017 the district maintained. At first, the presence of Chinese students was not controversial in the district community. But a group of area residents opposed the proposal, which surfaced in October 2014. Skilling approved the proposal because it could generate income for the district.

In December 2014, Skilling said he planned to retire on August 31, 2015. On February 11, 2015, the school board approved the dormitory deal, which was in a 20-year contract. Five members voted for it, and one voted against it. In May 2015, the school board immediately designated Tim Throne as the superintendent and canceled Skilling's contract. By November 2015, the Department of Homeland Security said Oxford Schools could from this point forward only house each Chinese international student for one year, with remaining two-year program students grandfathered in and taking their university courses at Rochester University.

As of 2017, the tuition for the Weiming program was $30,500 U.S. per student, a decline from the previous $40,000 per student. In turn, the district received $10,000 per student per year from Weiming.

=== COVID-19 pandemic ===
In November 2021, the school board considered refusing to follow the statewide mask mandate during the COVID-19 pandemic.

=== 2021 shooting ===
On November 30, 2021, a mass shooting occurred at Oxford High School. Four students were killed, and seven other people were injured. The shooter was 15-year-old sophomore student, Ethan Crumbley, who was taken into custody at the scene on the same day. Crumbley was charged as an adult, having been convicted on both murder and terrorism charges. Crumbley's parents had met with school personnel regarding his behavior just three hours before the shooting. Crumbley's cell phone contained a video about the shooting plans that he made the night before the shooting. He was arraigned on December 1 on charges including terrorism and four counts of premeditated murder. Crumbley's parents were charged on December 3 with involuntary manslaughter for failing to secure the handgun used in the shooting. Both were arraigned on December 4 on their charges.

Following public scrutiny of the school's handling of reports about Crumbley's behavior, Throne announced that a third-party investigation of the incident would be conducted. He also said he would recommend a review of the district's "entire system" to school board members. On December 9, multiple survivors of the shooting filed two $100 million lawsuits against the district and its employees. At least one lawsuit alleges that school officials failed to stop the shooting and ignored several warning signs, such as threats posted to social media that had been brought to the school's attention.

== Schools ==
Schools in Oxford Community Schools district
School	Address	Notes
Oxford High School	745 N. Oxford Rd., Oxford	Grades 9-12. Built 1998, expanded 2004.
Oxford Middle School	1420 Lakeville Rd., Oxford	Grades 6-8. Built 1982.
Daniel Axford Elementary	74 Mechanic, St., Oxford	Grades PreK-2. Built 1927.
Clear Lake Elementary	2085 W. Drahner, Oxford	Grades K-5
Lakeville Elementary	1400 E. Lakeville Rd., Oxford	Grades K-5
Leonard Elementary	335 E. Elmwood, Leonard	Grades K-5
Oxford Elementary	109 Pontiac St., Oxford	Grades 3-5
Oxford Early Learning Center	105 Pontiac St., Oxford	Preschool housed at Oxford Elementary.
Oxford Bridges High School	775 W. Drahner Rd., Oxford	Alternative high school.
Oxford Virtual Academy	775 W. Drahner Rd., Oxford	Grades K-12. Online school.
Oxford Crossroads Day School	810 James Hunt Drive, Oxford	Grades 6-12. Program for adjudicated youth housed at Crossroads for Youth.
