= Oxford High School (Michigan) =

School in Oxford, Michigan

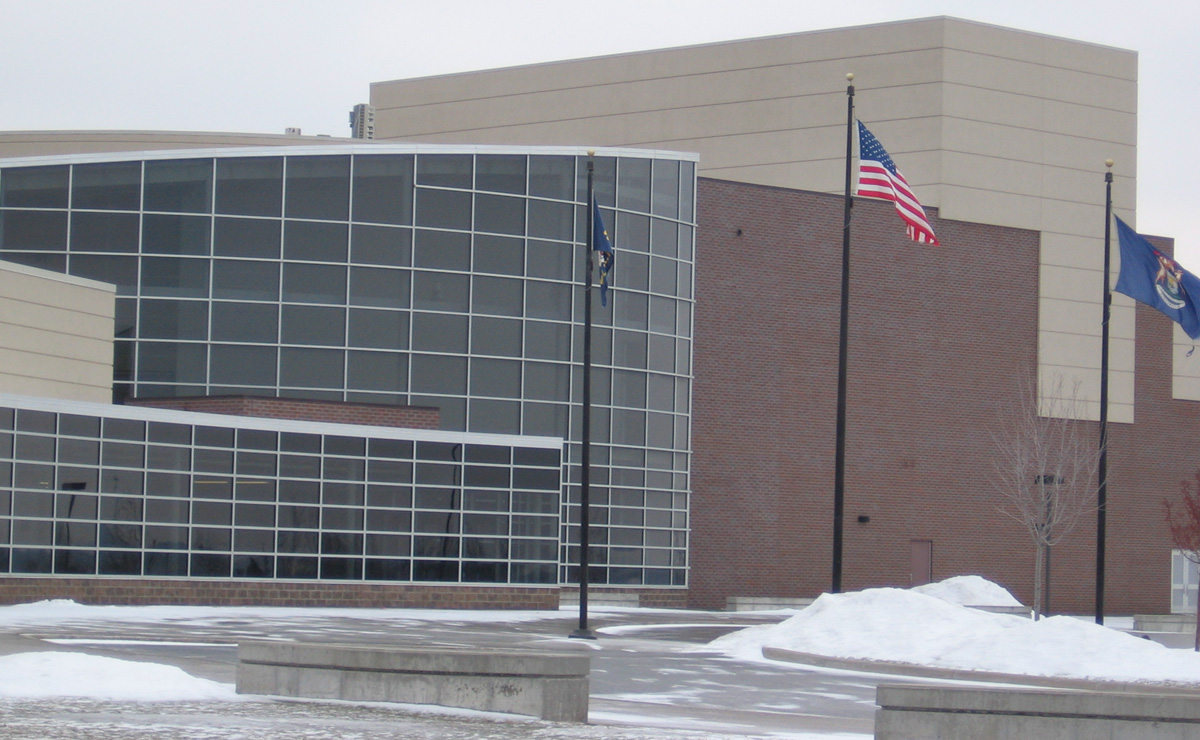
- The main entrance of Oxford High School, 2007

Location
- 745 North Oxford Road; Oxford address, Oakland County, Michigan 48371-3715; United States; 42.838°N 83.261°W

Information
- Type: Public secondary school
- Established: 2004
- Status: Open
- School board: 7
- School district: Oxford Community Schools
- NCES District ID: 2627240
- School code: MI-63110-02437
- CEEB code: 232935
- NCES School ID: 262724006338
- Principal: Brad Bigelow
- Teaching staff: 79.30 (on an FTE basis)
- Grades: 9–12
- Gender: Mixed-sex education
- Enrollment: 1,568 (2024–2025)
  - Grade 9: 390
  - Grade 10: 380
  - Grade 11: 353
  - Grade 12: 445
- Student to teacher ratio: 19.77
- Campus type: Suburb: Large
- Colors: Blue and gold
- Nickname: Wildcats
- Rivals: Lake Orion Dragons; Lapeer West Panthers
- USNWR ranking: 5,212
- Website: oxfordhigh.oxfordschools.org

Student assessments
- 2021–22 school year Change vs. prior year

M-STEP 11th grade proficiency rates (Science / Social Studies)
- Advanced %: 21.7 / 8.9
- Proficient %: 26.3 / 26.5
- PR. Proficient %: 15.8 / 49.0
- Not Proficient %: 36.2 / 15.6

Average test scores
- SAT Total: 1006.4 (▼ −15.3)

Oxford High School is a coed public secondary institution located in Oxford Township, Michigan, United States, with an Oxford postal address. Part of the Oxford Community Schools district, it is within one of the largest school districts, geographically, in southeastern lower Michigan.

== History ==
Oxford's first high school was built in 1887 and expanded in 1917. It was still in use in 1956, when Oxford's district consolidated with small outlying school districts, prompting the need for a new high school. It was then built at 105 Pontiac Street, and is currently Oxford Elementary. It served as the high school until 1982.

The current Oxford High School building was originally the district's middle school, which opened in fall 1998. By 2001, the high school had reached its 1,200-student capacity and was continuing to add students, but there was little room to expand on the high school site. The district proposed a bond issue to convert the high school into the middle school and build additions at the middle school to convert it to the high school. The additions were intended to surround the existing building, creating a new architectural identity. Designed by TMP Architecture, the new Oxford High School opened in fall 2004.

The previous high school, now the district's middle school, opened in spring 1982, replacing the 1956 high school. It used energy-efficiency features that were innovative at the time, such as earth sheltering and passive solar building design. Designed by Flint architectural firm Tomblinson, Harburn, Yurk & Associates, the building won the Engineering Society of Detroit's Construction Award.

On November 30, 2021, a mass shooting occurred at the high school. Four students were killed, and seven other people were injured.

The shooting occurred in the east academic corridor, and that section of the building was repaired with new carpet, paint, and ceilings. When students returned to the building on January 24, 2022, they found it decorated with cards of support from the district's younger students.

== Attendance boundary ==
The district (of which this is the sole comprehensive high school) serves portions of northeastern Oakland County and southwestern Lapeer County as well as a small northeast section of Macomb County. In Oakland County, it serves Oxford, Leonard, most of Oxford and Addison townships, and portions of Brandon Township. In Lapeer County, the district serves sections of Dryden and Metamora townships. The district also extends into a very small portion of Bruce Township, Macomb County.

== Curriculum ==
Oxford High School is an authorized International Baccalaureate World School for the Diploma Programme.

== Extracurricular activities ==
Oxford High School offers 24 different varsity sports. Teams participate in the Oakland Activities Association, a high school athletic conference whose member schools have similar enrollments and are all located in the Oakland County area. The statewide class designation (based on enrollment) is "Division 1" or "Class A".

The school's athletic nickname is the Wildcats. Both the high school and the middle school have teams which are referred to as the "Oxford Wildcats". Oxford's chief rival is Lake Orion, located directly in the township to the south, and connected by M-24. In football, the two teams compete for the "Double-O" (Oxford/Orion) rivalry trophy. The teams had competed annually from at least 1950 until 1983 when Oxford moved to the Flint Metro League. During FML play, Oxford's chief rivals were Lapeer East High School and Lapeer West High School, located in Lapeer approximately 15 miles north of Oxford on M-24.

Prior to the 2010-2011 year, Oxford High School moved from the Flint Metro League, where it had been a member school since 1983, to the Oakland Activities Association. Reasons cited for the move included demographic and geographic considerations. Urban sprawl in Metro Detroit over the years had brought Oxford in from the rural–urban fringe and closer in line with the greater Detroit area like much of the OAA, rather than the Flint area. As a result of the move, the sports rivalry with Lake Orion resumed after a 27-year hiatus.

Oxford has won state championships in boys track (1991 class B), football (1992 class BB), and wrestling (2011 class A).

In 2011, the school installed blue-colored artificial turf for the football stadium at a cost of $400,000, which was to be paid for with private donations. Initially, the turf was to be paid for with public bonds; however, voters disapproved of the millage. The AstroTurf made headlines when it was revealed that several athletics boosters had put their personal homes up as collateral for the purchase of the field. When initial fundraising efforts came up short, the boosters were hit with a $300,000 balance and were in danger of defaulting. An agreement was reached between the boosters and AstroTurf that allowed for an extended payback period. The turf also made headlines when Boise State University notified Oxford that they held a trademark on the term "Blue Turf" for their field at Albertsons Stadium. Therefore, Oxford could not continue calling their field "blue turf", but instead could use the terms "navy turf", "Oxford blue turf", or "true blue turf".

== Notable alumni ==
- Jim Bates, 1964, former professional football coach
- Mike Lantry, 1966, former University of Michigan football kicker
- Dave Rayner, 2001, former professional football player
- Ava Swiss, 2022, singer-songwriter and musician who was a semi-finalist on America's Got Talent
- Trey Townsend, 2020, professional basketball player
