= Lake Orion High School =

Public school in Michigan, United States

- The main entrance of Lake Orion High School, 2007

Location
- 495 East Scripps Road; Orion Township, Oakland, Michigan; 42°45′17″N 83°14′00″W

Information
- Type: Public high school
- Motto: Once a dragon, always a dragon
- Established: 1893, 1997 (current site)
- School district: Lake Orion Community Schools
- Superintendent: Heidi Mercer
- Principal: Daniel Haas
- Teaching staff: 108.52 (FTE)
- Grades: 9-12
- Enrollment: 2,035 (2024-2025)
- Student to teacher ratio: 18.75
- Colors: Green and white
- Nickname: Dragons
- Website: www.lakeorionschools.org/high-school-home

Student assessments
- 2021–22 school year Change vs. prior year

M-STEP 11th grade proficiency rates (Science / Social Studies)
- Advanced %: 23.2 / 19.2
- Proficient %: 29.9 / 30.8
- PR. Proficient %: 14.1 / 35.5
- Not Proficient %: 32.8 / 14.5

Average test scores
- SAT Total: 1042.3 (▼ −40.2)

Lake Orion High School is a public high school located in Orion Township, Michigan, United States. It is a part of Lake Orion Community Schools.

Its motto is "Once a dragon, always a dragon," coined by Jeff Heath.

Held once a year since 2015, the Leadership class organizes and plans Cell Out For Soldiers. Students voluntarily give up their cell phone for one school day. For every phone turned in, the Leadership class donates $1 to Cell Phones for Soldiers and students get a t-shirt in return. Almost every student participates, roughly 2,100.

As a graduation condition, all students are required to complete 40 hours of community service by the time they graduate, typically 10 hours a year.

LOHS hosts their graduation at Pine Knob Music Theatre.

== Athletics ==
State Championships

- 1925 - Boys' Basketball (Class E)
- 1990 - Wrestling (Class A/Division 1)
- 2007 - Girls' Golf (Division 1)
- 2007 - Baseball (Division 1)
- 2008 - Power Lifting (Club) (Class A)
- 2009 - Power Lifting (Club) (Class A)
- 2010 - Football (Division 1)
- 2012 - Boys' Track (Division 1)
- 2018 - Girls' Volleyball (Division 1)
- 2019 - Boys' Golf (Division 1)
- 2019 - Power Lifting (Club) (Class A)

== Notable alumni ==
- Matthew Blackmer, champion figure skater
- Matthew Dear, electronic avant-pop musician
- Jordan Desilets, steeplechase runner
- Andrew J. Feustel, NASA astronaut
- Tom Gillis, professional golfer
- Sebastian Harris, professional soccer player
- Jeff Heath, professional football player
- Frederick Henderson, former CEO of General Motors
- Zak Keasey, former professional football player
- Jamie Milam, professional hockey player
- Troy Milam, professional hockey player
- Shannon Pettypiece, journalist
- Raymond Plouhar, staff sergeant, USMC
- Connor Stalions, Captain USMC and football coach
- Ron Tripp, World Sambo and Judo Champion; president of USA Judo
- Seth Troxler, record producer, DJ
- Cynthia Watros, actress
