= Rochester, Michigan =

City in Michigan

- City
- City of Rochester
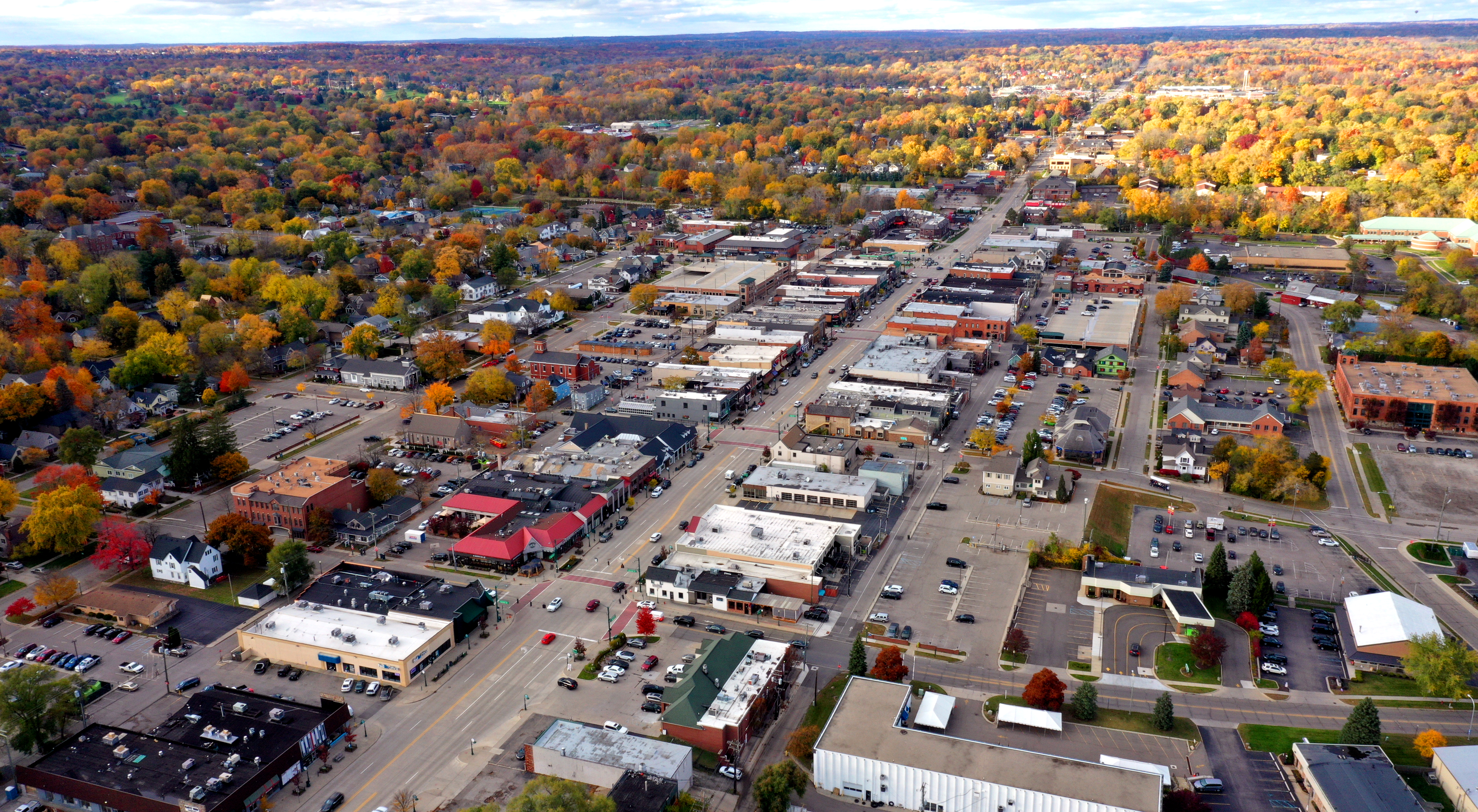
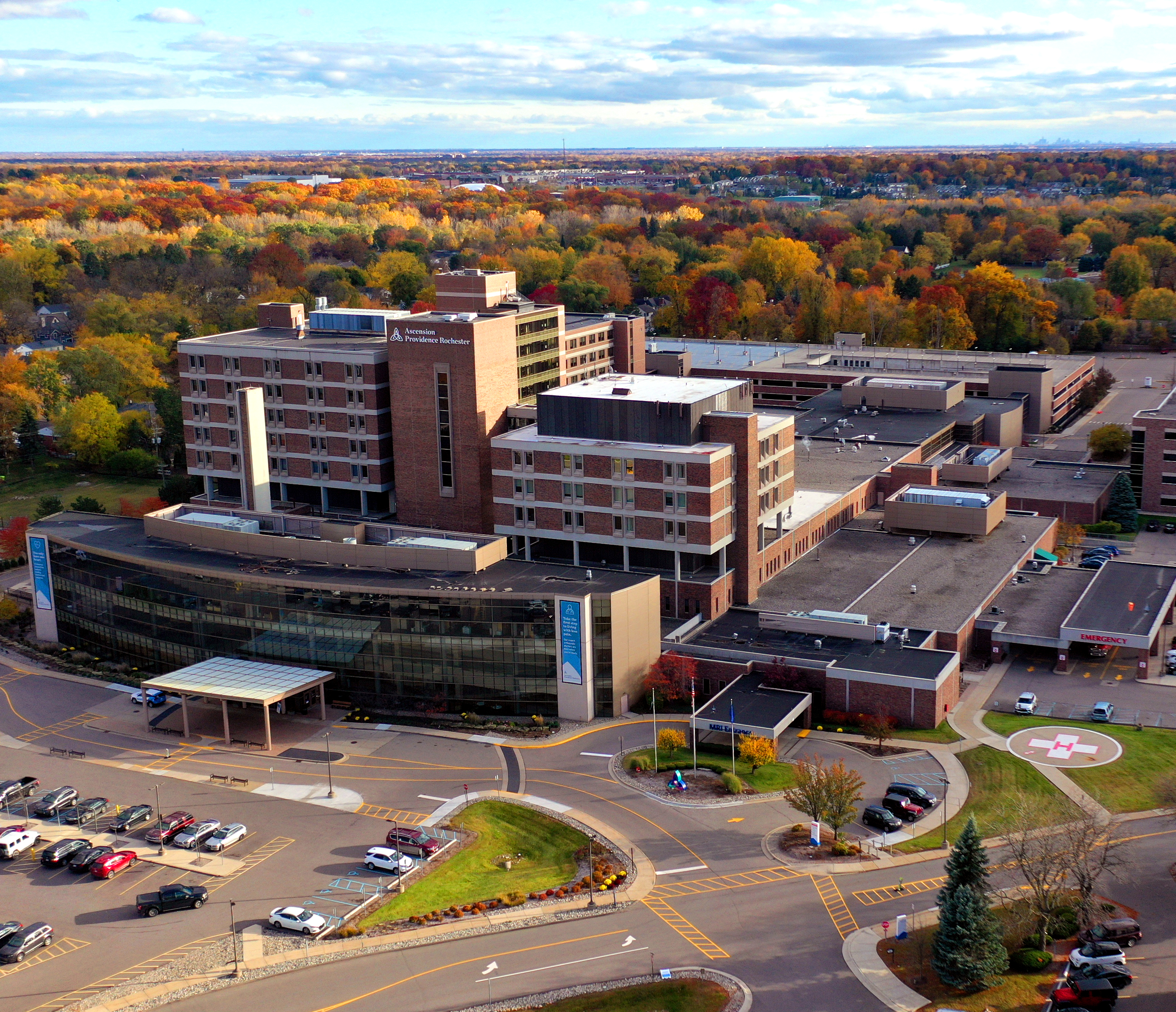
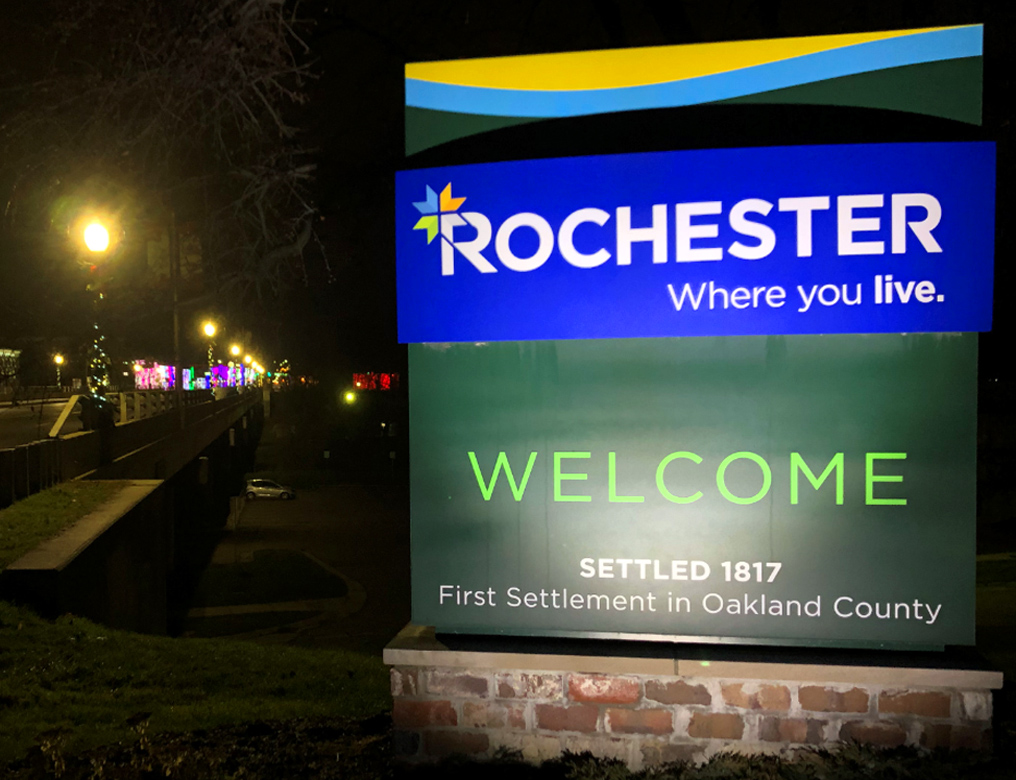
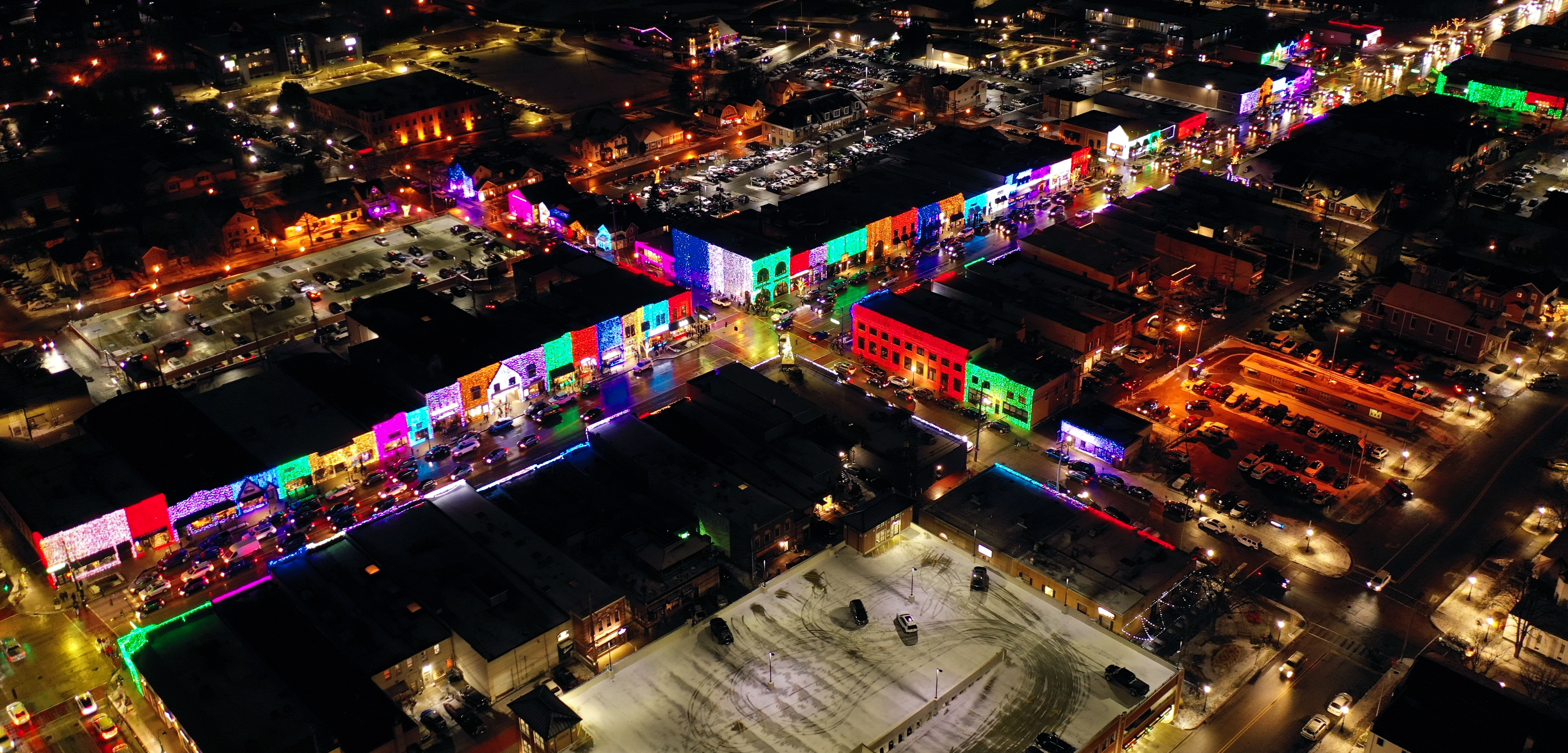
- Top-to-bottom, left-to-right: Downtown Rochester, Ascension Providence Hospital, Rochester's welcome sign, Downtown Rochester's Christmas Lights

- Seal wordmark

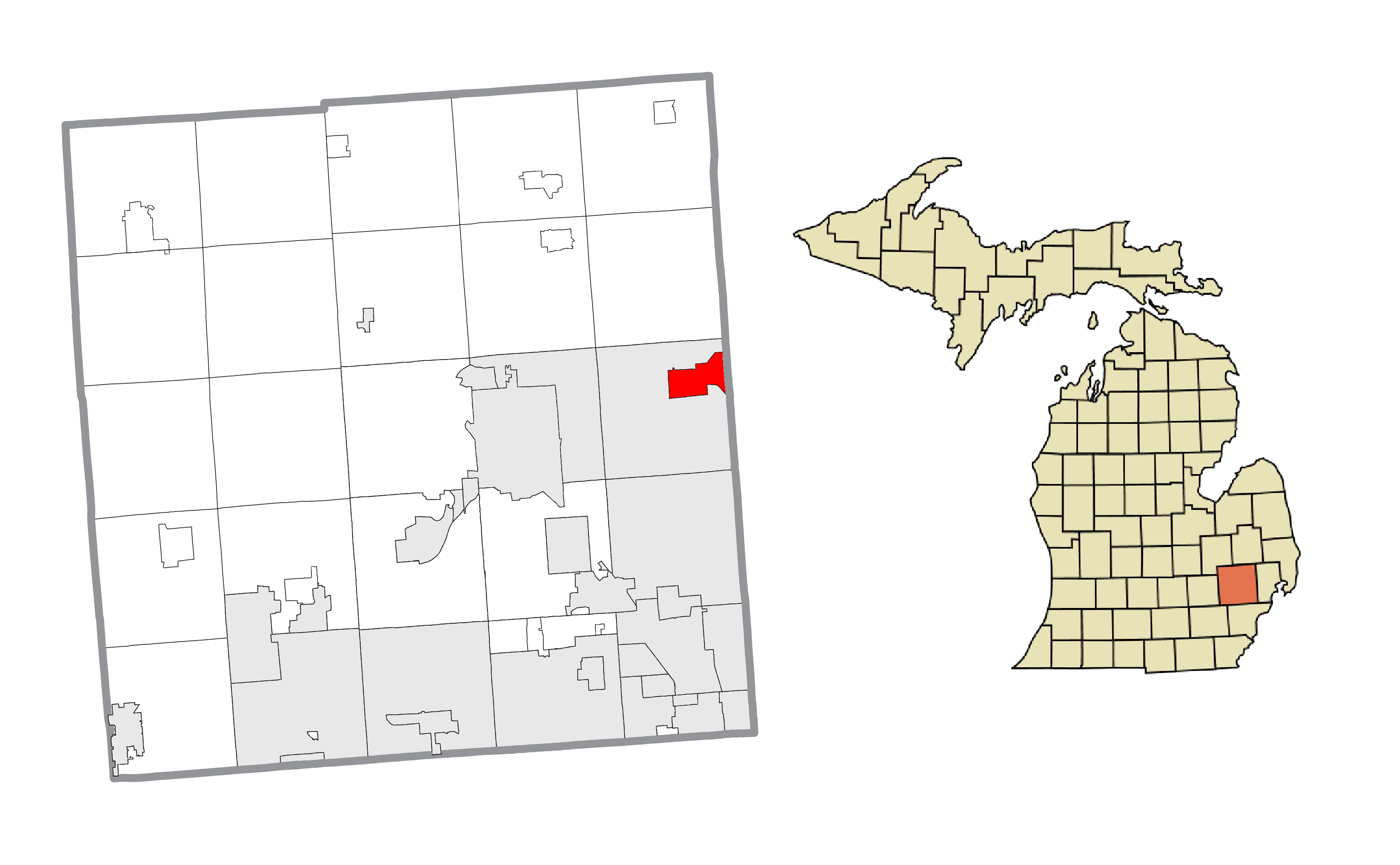
- Location within Oakland County

- Location within the state of Michigan
- Coordinates: 42°40′50″N 83°08′02″W
- Country: United States
- State: Michigan
- County: Oakland
- Settled: 1817; 209 years ago
- As village: 1869; 157 years ago
- Incorporated (city): 1967; 59 years ago

Government
  - Type: Mayor–council
  - Mayor: Debbie Jones
  - Manager: Nik Banda
  - Clerk: Brian D'Annunzio

Area
  - City: 3.83 sq mi (9.92 km^{2})
  - Land: 3.83 sq mi (9.92 km^{2})
  - Water: 0 sq mi (0.00 km^{2})
- Elevation: 751 ft (229 m)

Population (2020)
  - City: 13,035
  - Density: 3,402.6/sq mi (1,313.75/km^{2})
  - Metro: 4,296,250 (Metro Detroit)
- Time zone: UTC-5 (EST)
  - Summer (DST): UTC-4 (EDT)
- ZIP code(s): 48306–48308
- Area codes: 248 and 947
- FIPS code: 26-69020
- GNIS feature ID: 0636069
- Website: Official website

Rochester is a city in Oakland County in the U.S. state of Michigan. As of the 2020 census, Rochester had a population of 13,035. It is a northern suburb in Metro Detroit located 20 miles north of the city of Detroit.

Rochester was the first European settlement in Oakland County when it was founded in 1818. It became part of the Avon Township in 1835 and incorporated as an autonomous city in 1967. It is mostly surrounded by the city of Rochester Hills and also borders Shelby Township to the east.

== Communities and boroughs ==
The city has the following neighborhoods:

- Stony Creek is a neighborhood on the northeast end of the city on the border with Rochester Hills.
- The Bluffs is a neighborhood on the southeast corner of the city on the border with Rochester Hills.
- Yates is shared with Shelby Charter Township, Macomb County and Rochester Hills.

== History ==
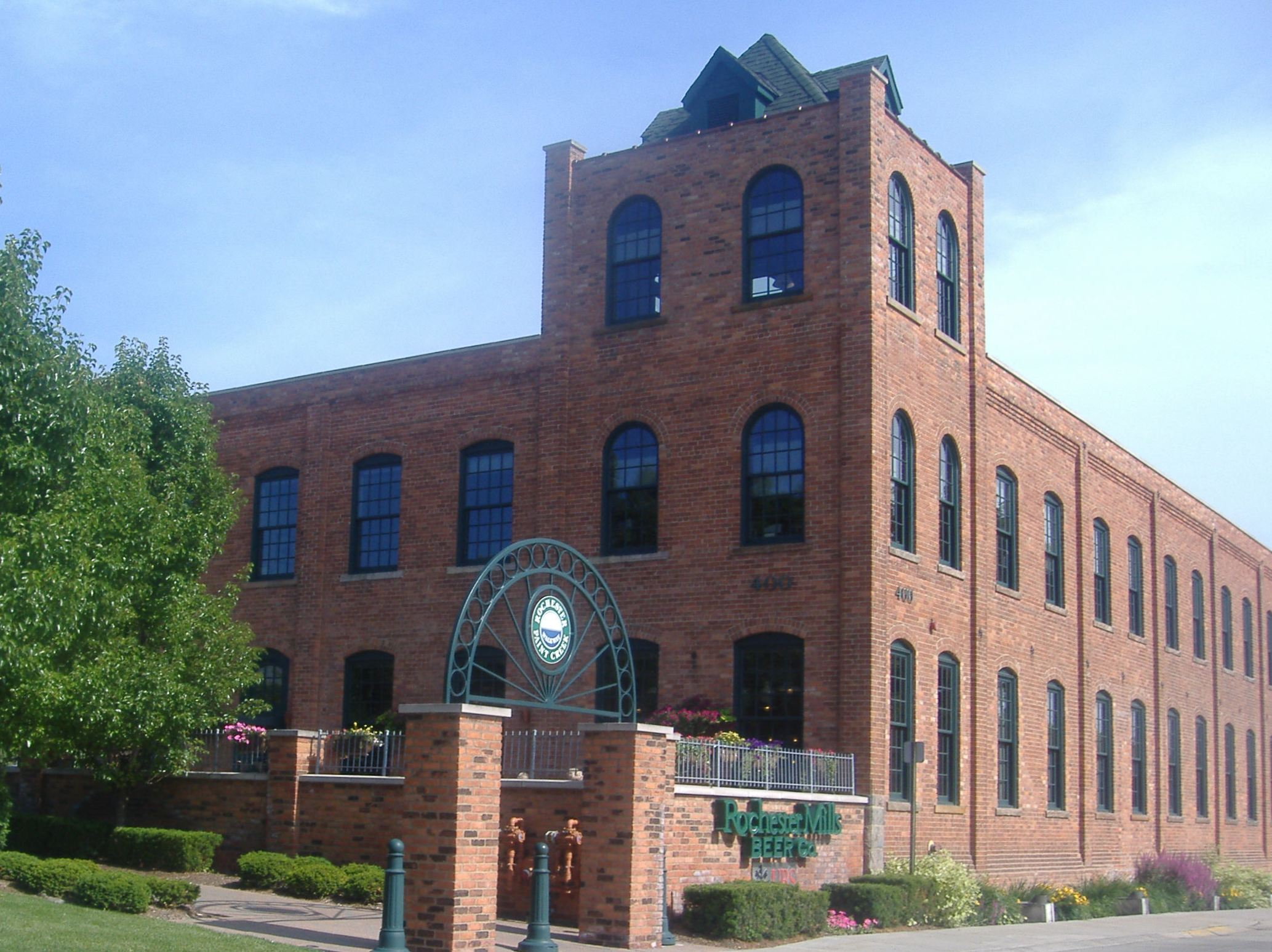
The Western Knitting Mills, built in 1896, was owned by the Chapman brothers.

Rochester had been settled since the prehistoric era, prior to about 3000 B.C. There appears to have been a village around the junction of Third and Main and at least three burial sites have been buried under city buildings.

The Odawa, Ojibwe, Potawatomi and Wyandot peoples all resided in the Rochester area. All of them ceded land claims by the early 19th century. The first settlers in what would become Rochester, the Graham family, built a log cabin in 1817. The cabin was located on present-day 3rd St., just west of Main. The city was named for Rochester, New York, just like Rochester, Minnesota, as many early settlers to the area were formerly from the state of New York.

The city became an industrial center with abundant water power from the Clinton River and Paint Creek. The interconnected waterways are no longer used for travel or local industry, but provide natural beauty, some fishing, and a healthy portion of the Clinton Watershed. Historically, past industries formerly located in Rochester included a refinery for sugar beets, a paper products company, and the Western Knitting Mills factory, which was later adapted and utilized during World War II for incendiary production—businesses that no longer exist in the area. Rochester was served by two railroads as well as the Detroit United Railway, an interurban to Royal Oak and Detroit.

Chapman Mill Pond, east of downtown, disappeared into the Paint Creek when the dam broke during the flood of 1946. The reclaimed land is the site of the current post office, Rochester Hills library, and Olde Towne Road. Water Street, formerly situated at the edge of the large pond, remains a reminder of it.

The Rochester Oral History Archive is an online collection of memories from elderly members of the community about the city. All of the audio recordings are publicly accessible and can viewed from their website.

Michigan became the 26th state in 1837, and the Village of Rochester was formed on April 12, 1869, within the boundaries of Avon Township. By 1895, Rochester's population was 900. The village became the city of Rochester in 1967, breaking away from Avon Township. Avon Township became the City of Rochester Hills in 1984, following a long court battle, where the city of Rochester annexed 2.2 square miles (5.7 km^{2}) of Avon Township's land. It more than doubled the city of Rochester's size.

== Geography ==
According to the United States Census Bureau, the city has a total area of 3.82 square miles (9.89 km^{2}), all land.

Since an annexation of a section of Avon Township (now Rochester Hills), the city has an eastern boundary that extends to the border with Macomb County.

== Government ==
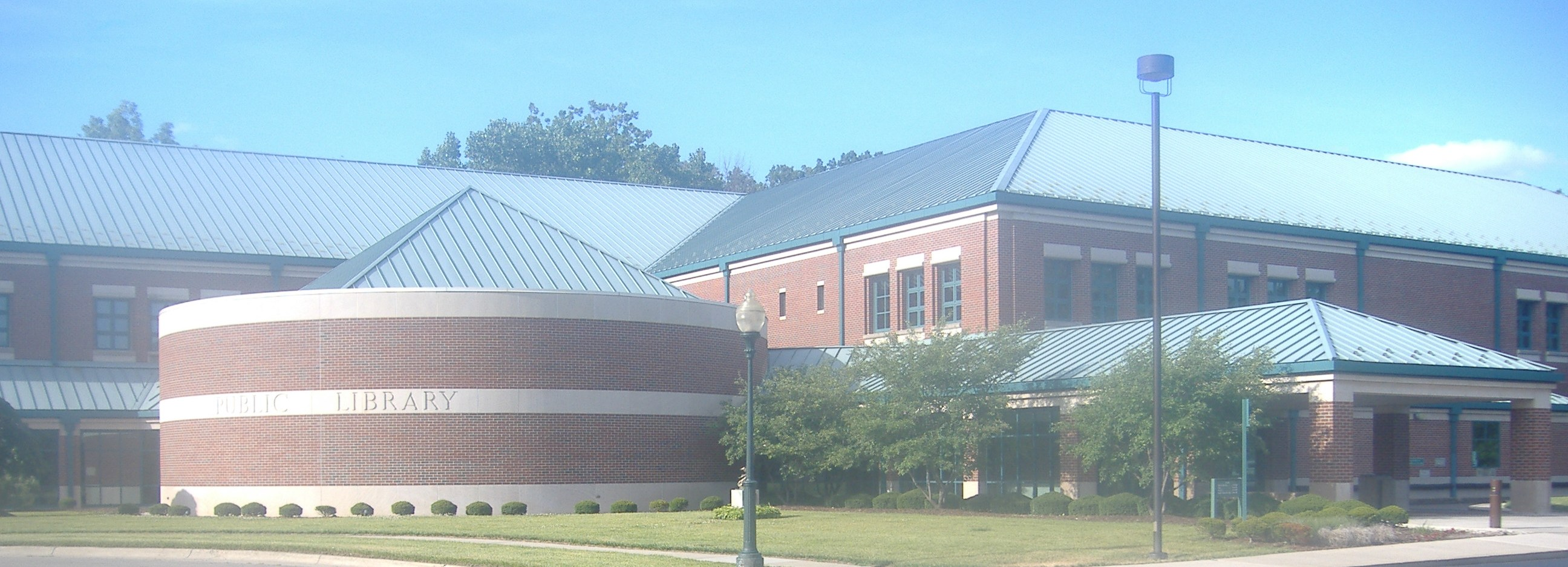
Rochester Hills Public Library in Rochester, MI

The city of Rochester is governed by a seven-member city council and its mayor. City policy is then administered by a full-time city manager. The government provides full city services, including police, fire and water/sewer services, similar to many other communities in north Oakland County.

The city contracts with neighboring Rochester Hills for public library services for the city's residents.

=== Federal, state, and county legislators ===
United States House of Representatives
District	Representative	Party	Since
10th	John James	Republican	2023

Michigan Senate
District	Senator	Party	Since
9th	Michael Webber	Republican	2023

Michigan House of Representatives
District	Representative	Party	Since
55th	Mark Tisdel	Republican	2021 (Note: Tisdel has represented Rochester Hills since 2021, but has only represented the 55th district since 2023.)

Oakland County Board of Commissioners
District	Commissioner	Party	Since
5	Michael Spisz	Republican	2013

== Culture ==
The city has held the annual "Rochester Hometown Christmas Parade" since 1951. Held on the first Sunday in December, it features over 100 units. It claims to be Michigan's largest Christmas parade.

In 2006, the city had its first "Big Bright Light Show" for the Christmas season. The downtown businesses were covered in 500,000 individual lights. An expansion of the program after its initial inception expanded that coverage to a reported one million lights. It was also aired by WXYZ-TV.

=== Architecture ===
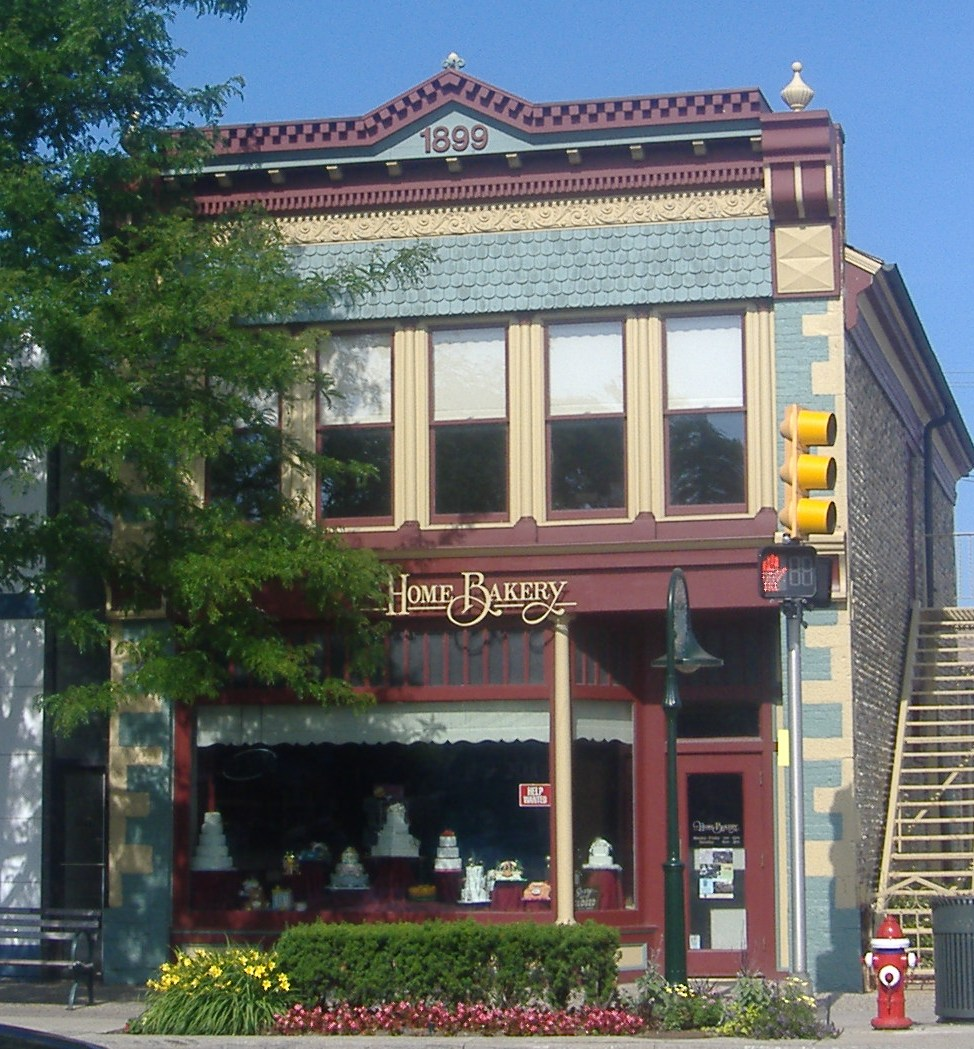
Rollin Sprague Building, built in 1849.

Established in 1817, Rochester was one of Oakland County's first settlements. Twenty-two buildings on Main Street are more than 50 years old, and several are on the State Register of Historic Places.

- Rollin Sprague Building – The oldest commercial building in the downtown is the Rollin Sprague building, built in 1849 of coursed cobblestone. Since 1930 it has housed "The Home Bakery".
- Opera House – The Opera House Building opened on November 8, 1890, as the social and cultural center of town. It featured movies, lectures, dances, commencements and other events until 1933. Ironically, an opera was never performed in the Opera House. Refurbished in 1987, it currently houses the Lytle Pharmacy.
- Rochester Grain Elevator – Located at the corner of University Drive and Water Street is the Rochester Grain Elevator (originally named Griggs Grain Elevator), in the form of a red barn, and built in 1880. Until the 1970s, farmers brought their grain to the elevator to be shipped to Detroit. After that time, its primary use has been as a supply store. An external restoration in the summer of 2009 worked toward returning the building to its former appearance.

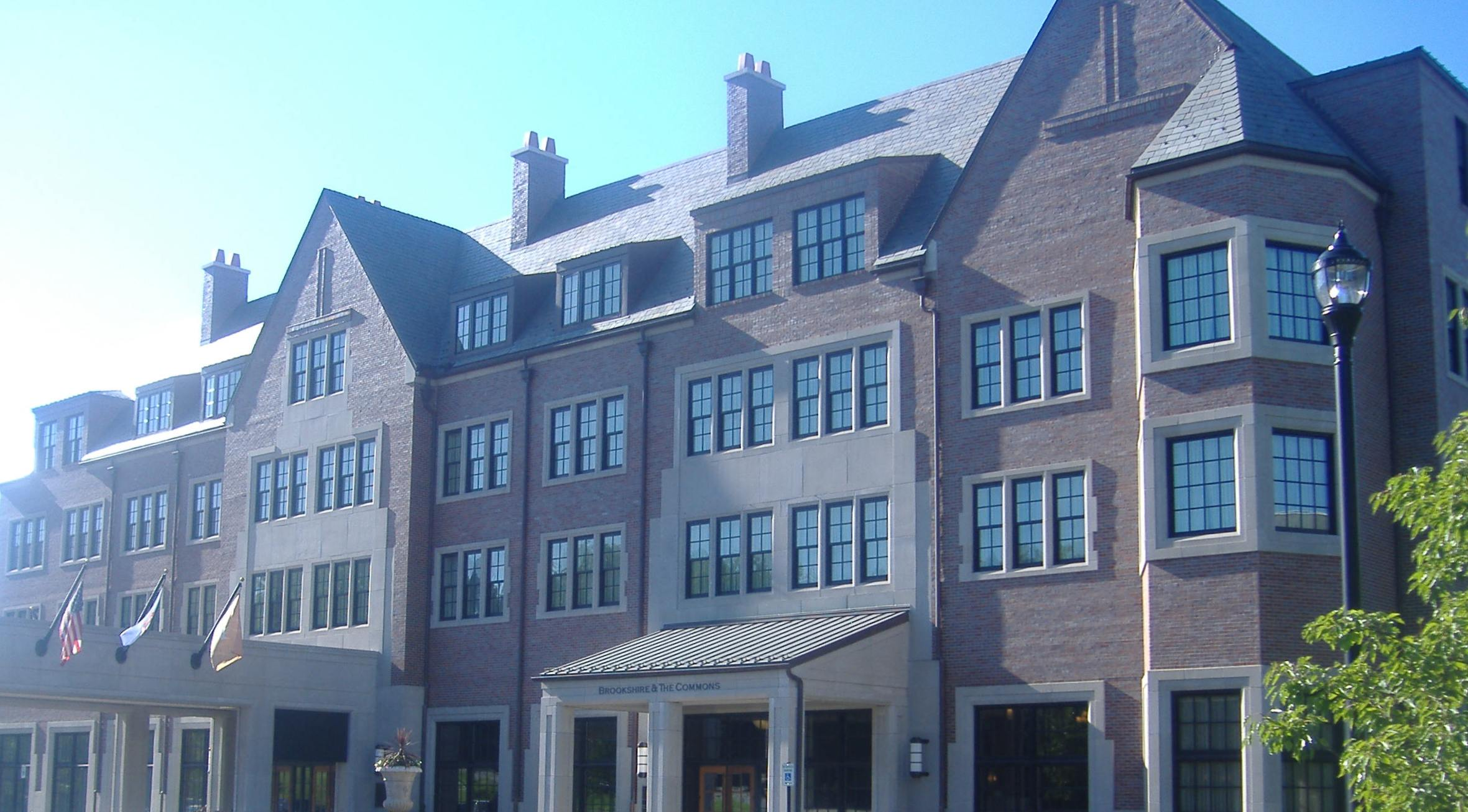
The Royal Park Hotel opened in September 2004.

- Royal Park Hotel – In September 2004, the Royal Park Hotel, a four-diamond luxury boutique hotel, designed by Victor Saroki opened in downtown Rochester. It cost $43 million to build. Several celebrities have stayed there, including Paul McCartney, Hugh Hefner, and former president George W. Bush (while seeking re-election).
- Western Knitting Mills – The Western Knitting Mills, a large brick building on Water Street, was built in 1896. At one time, its annual output of 100,000 dozen pairs of gloves made it one of the largest glove producers in the world. Today the mill is fully restored, and home to The Rochester Mills brewery restaurant, as well as several other businesses.
- RCS Administration Center is the former Rochester High School, at one point in its past serving kindergarten through graduating senior students. Built in 1889 but renovated at different times in its history, it opened as Rochester School (Avon #5), replacing an earlier school on that same site that had burned down in 1888. The property has been used for school purposes since 1847. Since the mid-1970s, the building has housed the Rochester Community Schools Board of Education offices and occasional related events, and is certainly one of the largest and noteworthy structures in the city.

=== Parks and recreation ===
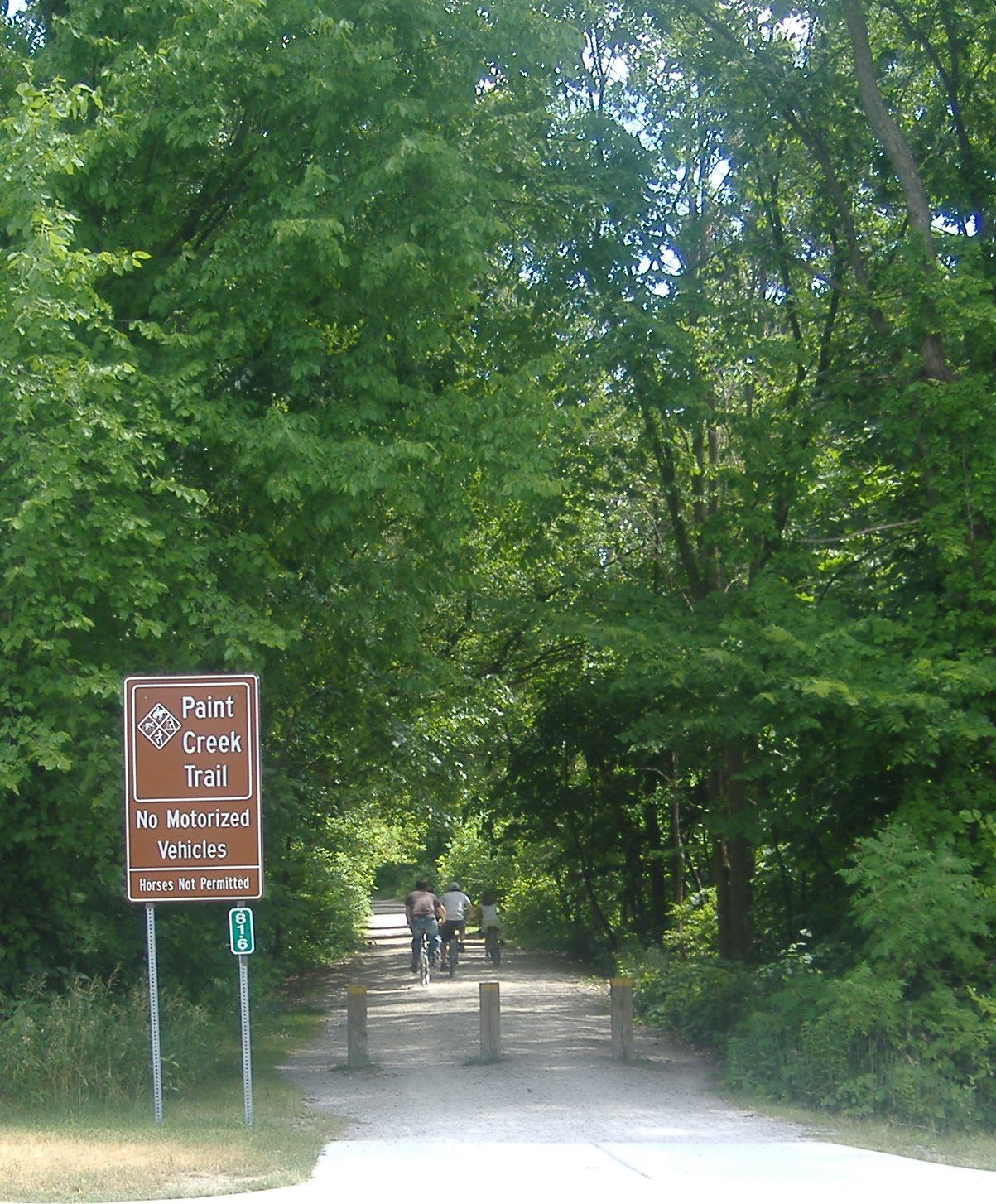
The Paint Creek Trail of 8.5 miles (14 km) connects the Rochester area to the Lake Orion, Michigan area.

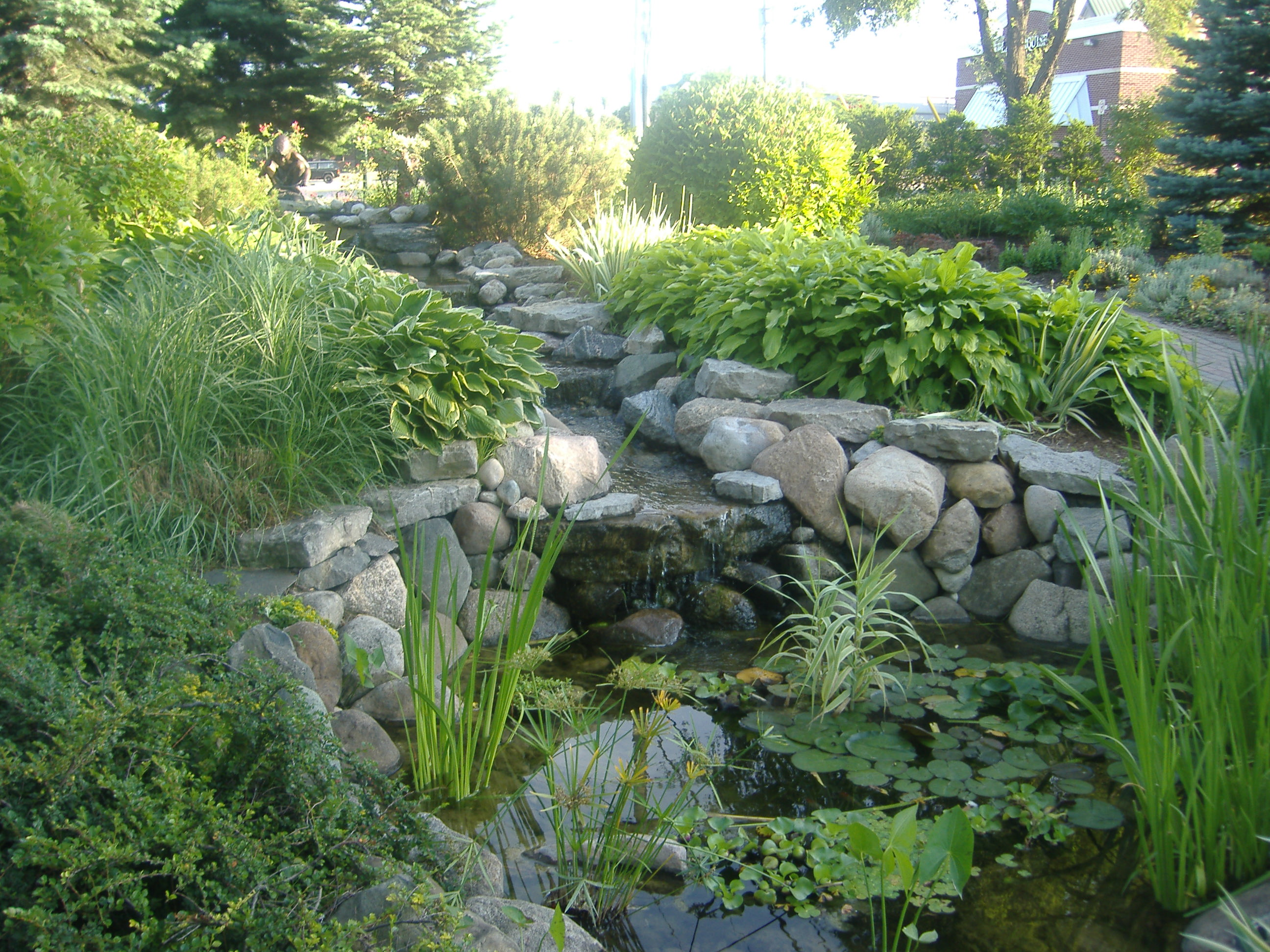
Rotary Gateway Park in Rochester, Michigan.

- Paint Creek and Clinton River Trails – City is at the cross section of two major "Rails-to-Trails" projects: the Paint Creek Trail and Clinton River trail. These trails are used for recreational activities, like biking and walking. They connect to several major parks, including Bloomer Park, Rochester Municipal Park, Stoney Creek Metropark and the Dinosaur Hill Nature Preserve. The majority of the area used for the trails and pathways include former railroad and interurban rail lines, long since converted to non-vehicular recreational use.
- Paint Creek Center for the Arts – Paint Creek Center for the Arts is a regional non-profit art center dedicated to promoting the arts and artistic excellence through a full range of cultural programming including studio art classes for children and adults, exhibitions of emerging and established Michigan artists, outreach programs, community involvement and the annual Art & Apples Festival.
- Rochester Avon Recreation Authority – The Rochester Avon Recreation Authority (RARA) has been a recreation provider to Rochester, Rochester Hills, and Oakland Township since 1946. It provides recreation programs from 12 months to adults in a variety of areas, such as dance, sports classes, sport leagues, pre-school classes, special events, fitness, skiing, etc.
- Rochester Municipal Park – Formerly called Avon Park, is the largest park area in the city, comprising a large portion of the downtown area. Linked with the Paint Creek trail system (and including a significant portion of the creek itself), it offers a quiet, naturalized setting, easily enjoyed from its own trail system, as well as two playground areas, lighted tennis courts, an outdoor music-stage amphitheater, the Rochester Community House, and the Kiwanis Pavilion. The 'duck pond' has been used in past winters for skating. The public park is home to free annual events such as the Art & Apples Festival, the Heritage Festival, and the summer concert series (Music In The Park).

== Economy ==
Rochester has a shopping district in the downtown area. A farmer's market takes place on Saturdays, May through October. Goods on offer include fresh produce, flowers, and other products made in Michigan.

Several city festivals take place in downtown: MI Earthday Festival (on Earthday weekend), Dancing in the Streets (August), Music in the Park (Thursdays in summer), Art & Apples Festival (weekend after Labor Day in September), and the Heritage Festival (Memorial Day Weekend), which includes two classic automobile shows. Other scheduled, traditional civic celebrations and activities include Girls' Night Out, the Gallery Walk, Lagniappe, the Sidewalk Sales, Movies In The Moonlight, and the two-day Fire And Ice Festival. The popular Rockin' Rods classic car show each August features hundreds of rare and unusual automobiles, both domestic and imported.

The Older Persons Commission provides social and educational activities, nutritional meals, senior resource services, as well as health and wellness programs to community members 50 years old and older.

== Demographics ==
Historical population
Census	Pop.	Note	%±
1880	996		—
1890	900		−9.6%
1900	1,535		70.6%
1910	1,516		−1.2%
1920	2,549		68.1%
1930	3,554		39.4%
1940	3,759		5.8%
1950	4,279		13.8%
1960	5,431		26.9%
1970	7,054		29.9%
1980	7,203		2.1%
1990	7,130		−1.0%
2000	10,467		46.8%
2010	12,711		21.4%
2020	13,035		2.5%
U.S. Decennial Census

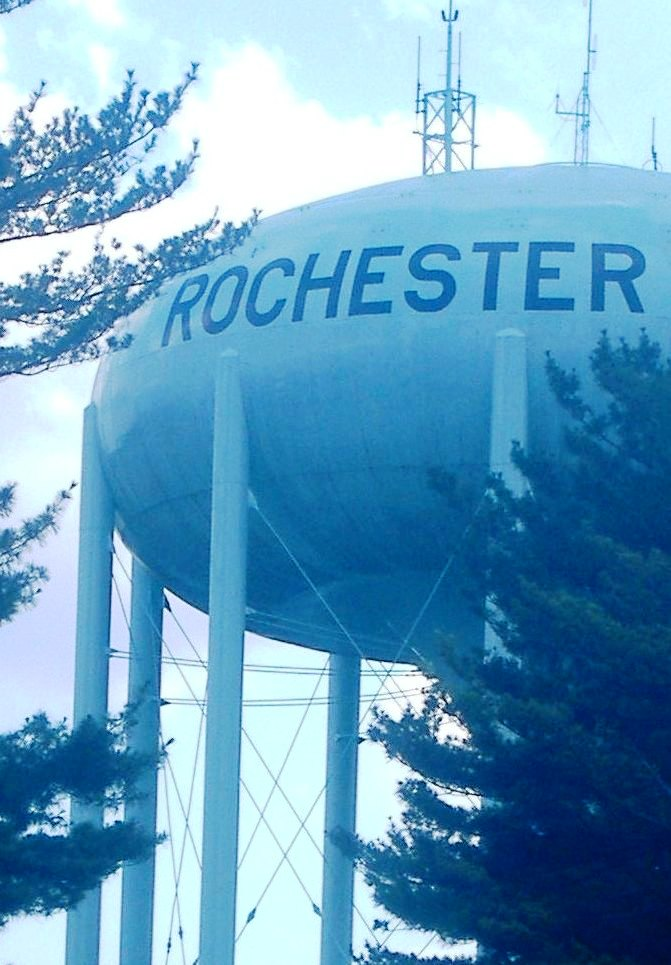
Water Tower, City of Rochester, Michigan

=== 2020 census ===
As of the 2020 census, Rochester had a population of 13,035. The median age was 41.0 years. 20.5% of residents were under the age of 18 and 16.0% of residents were 65 years of age or older. For every 100 females there were 95.0 males, and for every 100 females age 18 and over there were 93.8 males age 18 and over.

100.0% of residents lived in urban areas, while 0.0% lived in rural areas.

There were 5,770 households in Rochester, of which 26.5% had children under the age of 18 living in them. Of all households, 47.0% were married-couple households, 20.5% were households with a male householder and no spouse or partner present, and 27.4% were households with a female householder and no spouse or partner present. About 35.7% of all households were made up of individuals and 11.4% had someone living alone who was 65 years of age or older.

There were 6,138 housing units, of which 6.0% were vacant. The homeowner vacancy rate was 1.3% and the rental vacancy rate was 6.7%.

Racial composition as of the 2020 census
Race	Number	Percent
White	10,647	81.7%
Black or African American	340	2.6%
American Indian and Alaska Native	29	0.2%
Asian	1,005	7.7%
Native Hawaiian and Other Pacific Islander	1	0.0%
Some other race	171	1.3%
Two or more races	842	6.5%
Hispanic or Latino (of any race)	621	4.8%

=== 2010 census ===
As of the census of 2010, there were 12,711 people, 5,514 households, and 3,195 families residing in the city. The population density was 3,318.8 inhabitants per square mile (1,281.4/km^{2}). There were 5,994 housing units at an average density of 1,565.0 per square mile (604.2/km^{2}). The racial makeup of the city was 88.6% White, 3.7% African American, 0.2% Native American, 5.5% Asian, 0.6% from other races, and 1.5% from two or more races. Hispanic or Latino residents of any race were 2.7% of the population.

There were 5,514 households, of which 30.9% had children under the age of 18 living with them, 47.3% were married couples living together, 7.7% had a female householder with no husband present, 2.9% had a male householder with no wife present, and 42.1% were non-families. 35.5% of all households were made up of individuals, and 8.8% had someone living alone who was 65 years of age or older. The average household size was 2.31 and the average family size was 3.09.

The median age in the city was 38.3 years. 25.1% of residents were under the age of 18; 7.6% were between the ages of 18 and 24; 29.4% were from 25 to 44; 26.4% were from 45 to 64; and 11.5% were 65 years of age or older. The gender makeup of the city was 48.0% male and 52.0% female.

=== 2000 census ===
As of 2000 the median income for a household in the city was $65,179, and the median income for a family was $92,078. Males had a median income of $62,486 versus $37,107 for females. The per capita income for the city was $36,989. About 0.6% of families and 2.7% of the population were below the poverty line, including 1.0% of those under age 18 and 5.9% of those age 65 or over.

== Education ==
Rochester is served by Rochester Community Schools, whose boundaries completely encompass the city. A majority of the residents are zoned to Stoney Creek High School, with a small part of the west side of the city instead zoned to Rochester High School. Both high schools are located in Rochester Hills.

Oakland University, while geographically split between the cities of Rochester Hills and Auburn Hills, has maintained a Rochester mailing address since its inception in 1958. The main campus buildings are located in the nearby but not adjacent city of Auburn Hills.

== People ==
This list includes people from the area (Rochester Hills, Rochester, and Oakland Township) (48306, 48307, 48309, 48363)

- Jimmy Carson, former professional hockey player
- Tommy Clufetos, drummer for Ozzy Osbourne, Rob Zombie, Alice Cooper and Ted Nugent; graduated from Rochester Adams HS
- Paul Davis, former professional basketball player
- Eminem, Grammy-winning rapper, actor, producer, songwriter; owned a house in Oakland Township.
- Eric Fisher, former NFL offensive lineman
- Hal Foster, award-winning artist and writer of comic strip Prince Valiant; born in Canada, lived in Rochester during his work on comic strip
- Amy Frazier, former professional tennis player; career included 20 consecutive US Open appearances
- Jay Gibbons, former professional baseball player
- Andrew Good, former professional baseball player; graduated from Rochester High
- Brothers Hildebrandt, fantasy artists and painters of original Star Wars movie poster
- Max Jones, professional ice hockey player
- Bob Keselowski, NASCAR Craftsman Truck Series driver
- Brad Keselowski, NASCAR driver, driver of #2 Miller Lite Dodge for Penske Racing, 2012 NASCAR Sprint Cup champion
- Walt Kowalczyk, former NFL player
- Jana Kramer, country artist
- Tim Lelito, former NFL offensive lineman
- Elmore Leonard, novelist and screenwriter
- Madonna, artist and entertainer grew up in Rochester Hills and graduated from Rochester Adams HS
- Alec Martinez, professional ice hockey player
- Dorthy Moxley, educator and crime victim advocate, graduated from Rochester High
- Karen Newman, former U.S. national anthem singer for the Detroit Red Wings
- Craig Owens, lead singer of Chiodos and Cinematic Sunrise
- Kevin Pereira, game show host
- Roxy Petrucci, drummer of all-female rock/metal band Vixen in 1980s
- Jesse R. Pitts, sociologist, founder of The Tocqueville Review, pioneered work on marginality, deviance and conformity
- Zach Putnam, former professional baseball pitcher
- Rude Jude, television and radio personality, graduated from Rochester High
- Brian Sell, retired marathoner, resides in Rochester Hills
- Joey Sturgis, record producer, resides in Oakland Township
- Ron Teachworth, educator, artist, writer and filmmaker
- Jack Tocco, Detroit Mafia boss
- Jacob Trouba, professional ice hockey player
- Peter Vanderkaay, swimmer, grew up in Oakland Township and graduated from Rochester Adams HS in 2002; won gold medal at 2004 Summer Olympics in 4x200 free style relay; in 2008 Beijing Olympics, won bronze medal in 200m freestyle and gold in 4 × 200 m freestyle relay
- Jason Varitek, former professional baseball catcher for Boston Red Sox, team captain and 2-time World Series champion; was born in Rochester
- Dita Von Teese, burlesque artist, model and actress
- Christian Wolanin, professional ice hockey player; born in Canada, lived in Rochester
- Robert Simpson Woodward, physicist and mathematician, was born in Rochester; professor at Columbia, president of American Mathematical Society, dean of Carnegie Institute in Washington
- Aileen Wuornos, serial killer

== See also ==
- List of Registered Historic Places in Oakland County, Michigan
