= Thiago David Olson =

Venture capitalist and entrepreneur

Thiago David Olson (born 1989) is a venture capitalist, electrical engineer and entrepreneur. Olson is the co-founder and CEO of Stratos Technologies, Inc., creators of the Stratos Card. As an electrical engineer Olson became known as a teenager for his research in Nuclear Fusion and Neutron Sciences. As a 17-year-old, attending Stoney Creek High School in Rochester Hills, Michigan, Olson created a homemade nuclear fusion reactor. In his article Neutron activation analysis using an inertial electrostatic confinement fusion device he indicated that his apparatus did not produce surplus energy.

For this work, he received a first place Special Award given by the AVS/VTD in 2007 in connection with a second place prize in the Intel International Science and Engineering Fair 2007, section Physics and Astronomy

He studied at Vanderbilt University and Princeton University. In 2009, he was one of three students to receive a Department of Defense SMART Fellowship, which supports students who demonstrate interest in conducting applied research.

Olson previously worked as an electrical engineer at the U.S. Department of Defense.

The minor planet 23262 Thiagoolson has been named after Olson for his research in nuclear fusion and neutron sciences.
