= Going Back =

Going Back may refer to:

- Going Back (album), a 2010 album by Phil Collins
- Going Back (film), a 1983 film starring Bruce Campbell
- Going Back, a.k.a. Under Heavy Fire, a 2001 TV film with Casper Van Dien
- "Goin' Back", a 1966 song written by Gerry Goffin and Carole King
