= Rochester High School (Michigan) =

Public school in Michigan, United States

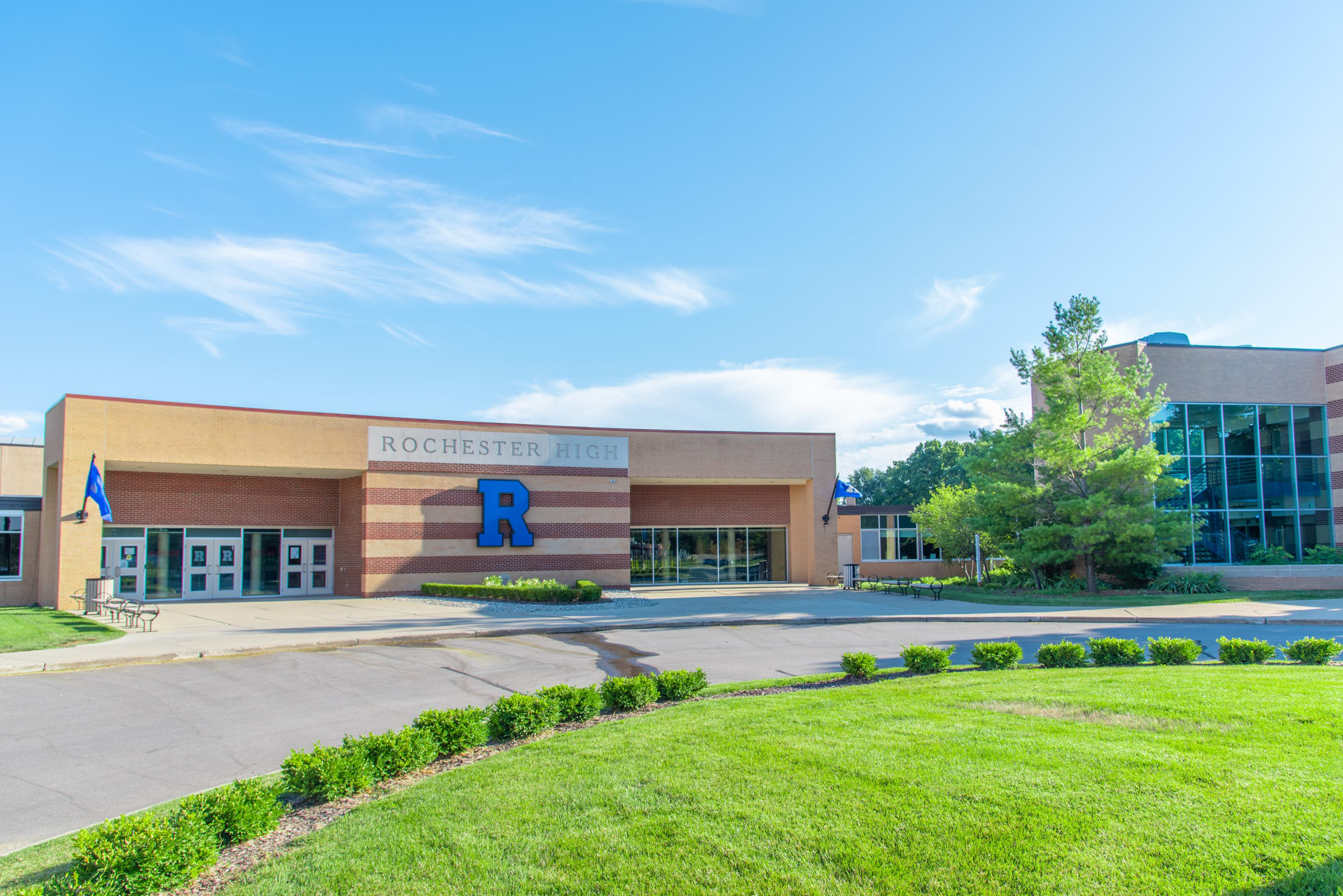

Location
- 1361 Walton Blvd; Rochester Hills, Michigan 48309; United States; 42.679°N 83.155°W

Information
- Type: Public high school
- Established: 1883, 1955
- School district: Rochester Community Schools
- Principal: Josh Wrinkle
- Teaching staff: 79.49 (FTE)
- Grades: 9-12
- Enrollment: 1,671 (2023-2024)
- Student to teacher ratio: 21.02
- Colors: Blue and White
- Nickname: Falcons
- Newspaper: The Talon
- Website: Rochester High School

Student assessments
- 2021–22 school year Change vs. prior year

M-STEP 11th grade proficiency rates (Science / Social Studies)
- Advanced %: 14.8 / 17.3
- Proficient %: 29.1 / 35.3
- PR. Proficient %: 15.8 / 37.6
- Not Proficient %: 40.4 / 9.8

Average test scores
- SAT Total: 1074.7 (▼ −18.1)

Rochester High School is a public high school located in Rochester Hills, Michigan, United States, and is part of the Rochester Community Schools. It was established in 1883, and classes have been held in the current facility since 1955.

The school mascot is Freddie the Falcon. Most students attending this school come from Reuther Middle School, West Middle School, or Holy Family Regional School.

== History ==
In 1889, Rochester's first high school, known as the "Academy on the Hill", was built on Fourth and Wilcox in the (then) Village of Rochester for $8,000. The first class graduated from Rochester High School in 1896. The historic structure still exists, long since adapted and widely renovated for Board of Education offices and a variety of other uses.

Rochester High accreditation was granted in 1924.

In 1955, groundbreaking for a new building at the current location on the corner of Livernois and Walton in Rochester Hills took place and on October 31, 1956, students walked from the "Academy on the Hill" to the new Rochester High School, many carrying their books along with them. The gymnasium was added in 1957. The two-story wing (freshman hallway) was built in 1961. The auditorium, the bridge (a.k.a. Falcon Freeway), and the swimming pool were added in 1965. The school split to a half-day schedule to accommodate the growing student population while Rochester Adams High School was being built and completed in 1970. In 1986, the mall enclosure, media center, cafeteria, and auxiliary gym were added. In 1998, a courtyard was converted into four classrooms. In 1999, the metal shop was converted into two classrooms.

A complete renovation of Rochester High took place in 2001, which included upgrades to the main office, counseling offices, weight room, pool, gymnasium, the addition of computer labs and photography lab, theater and vocal area, additional science labs, new locker banks, an enhanced courtyard with green house, and a new auditorium and theater areas.

In 2012, the school organized a series of murals and artwork displays within the building's hallways to showcase student accomplishments and school spirit.

The school began a new round of renovations in the fall of 2016 after the renewing of the funding bond. Renovations included a new football and soccer stadium and updates to the athletic, theater, and music wings.

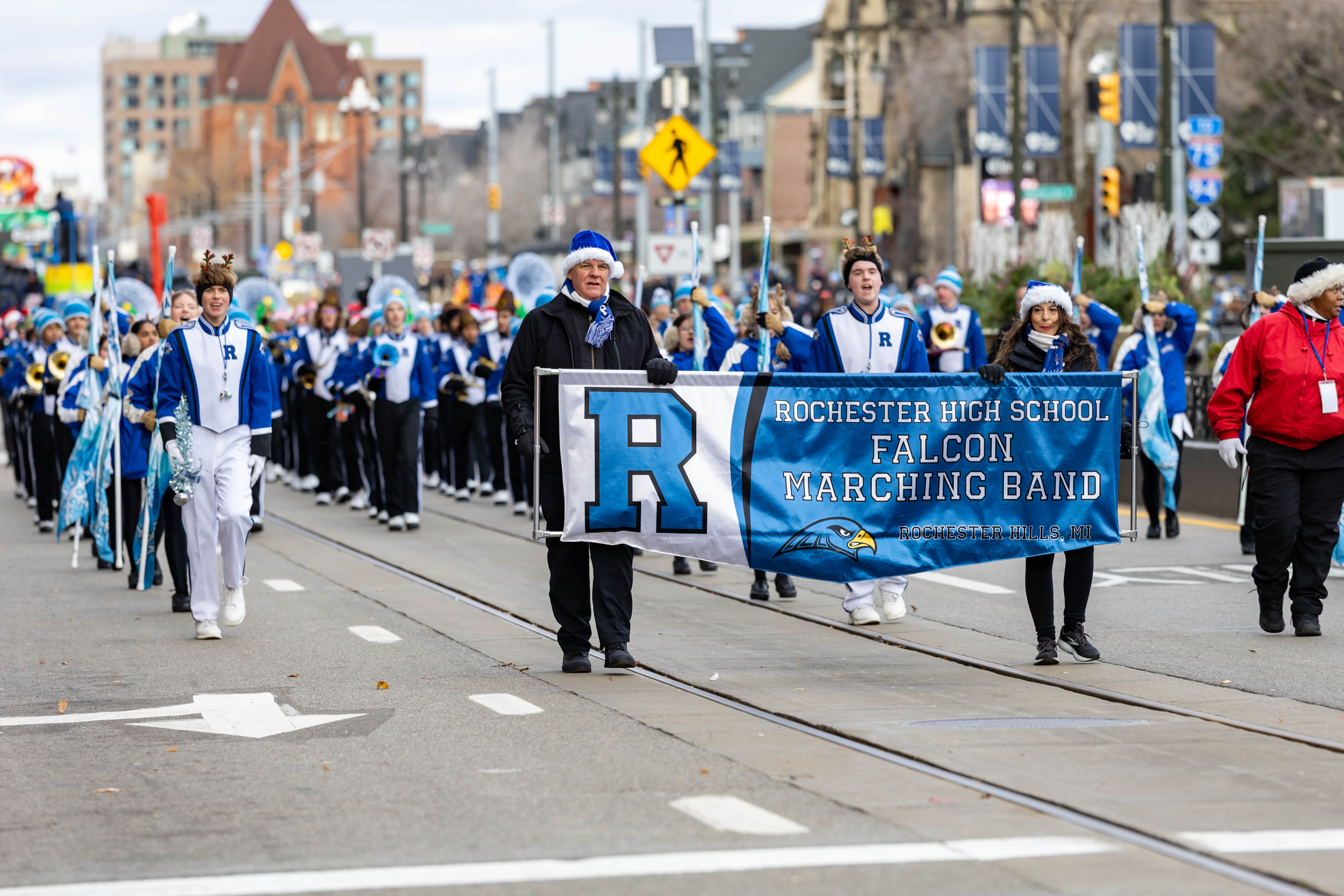
The Falcon Marching Band in the 2025 America's Thanksgiving Parade in Detroit

== Band ==
The high school takes pride in its band program and boasts many different musical ensembles: Concert Band, Symphony Band, Wind Ensemble, Pit Orchestra, Pep Band, Jazz Band, and "Rochester's First and Finest", the Falcon Marching Band. Since 2007, the FMB has received over 15 straight Division I ratings from the MSBOA Marching Band Festival. The Falcon Marching Band regularly performs at many different events across the community, including Downtown Rochester's Art and Apples Festival, the OPC Senior Day Picnic, the Detroit Veterans Day Parade, the Rochester Hometown Christmas Parade, and even the Sarnia Santa Claus Parade in Canada.

Since 1983, the school has only had 3 band directors: August J. Thoma from 1983 to 2007, Timothy Nadeau from 2007 to 2014, and David A. Uhrig from 2014 to present.

== Notable alumni ==
- Porcelain Black, née Alaina Beaton, pop singer
- Jim Burton, former MLB player (Boston Red Sox)
- Paul Davis, former NBA player (Los Angeles Clippers)
- Andrew Good, Major League Baseball pitcher
- Robert Hurst, jazz bassist
- Andrew Hutchinson, National Hockey League defenseman
- Brad Keselowski, NASCAR stock car driver
- Dorthy Moxley (1932–2024), educator and crime victim advocate
- Gary Peters, United States Senator from Michigan
- Jake Davis, MLS player for Sporting Kansas City
- Walker Russell, Jr., NBA player for the Detroit Pistons
- L. J. Shelton, National Football League offensive tackle
- James Young, NBA player; 2019-20 top scorer in the Israel Basketball Premier League
