= Western Knitting Mills =

- U.S. National Register of Historic Places
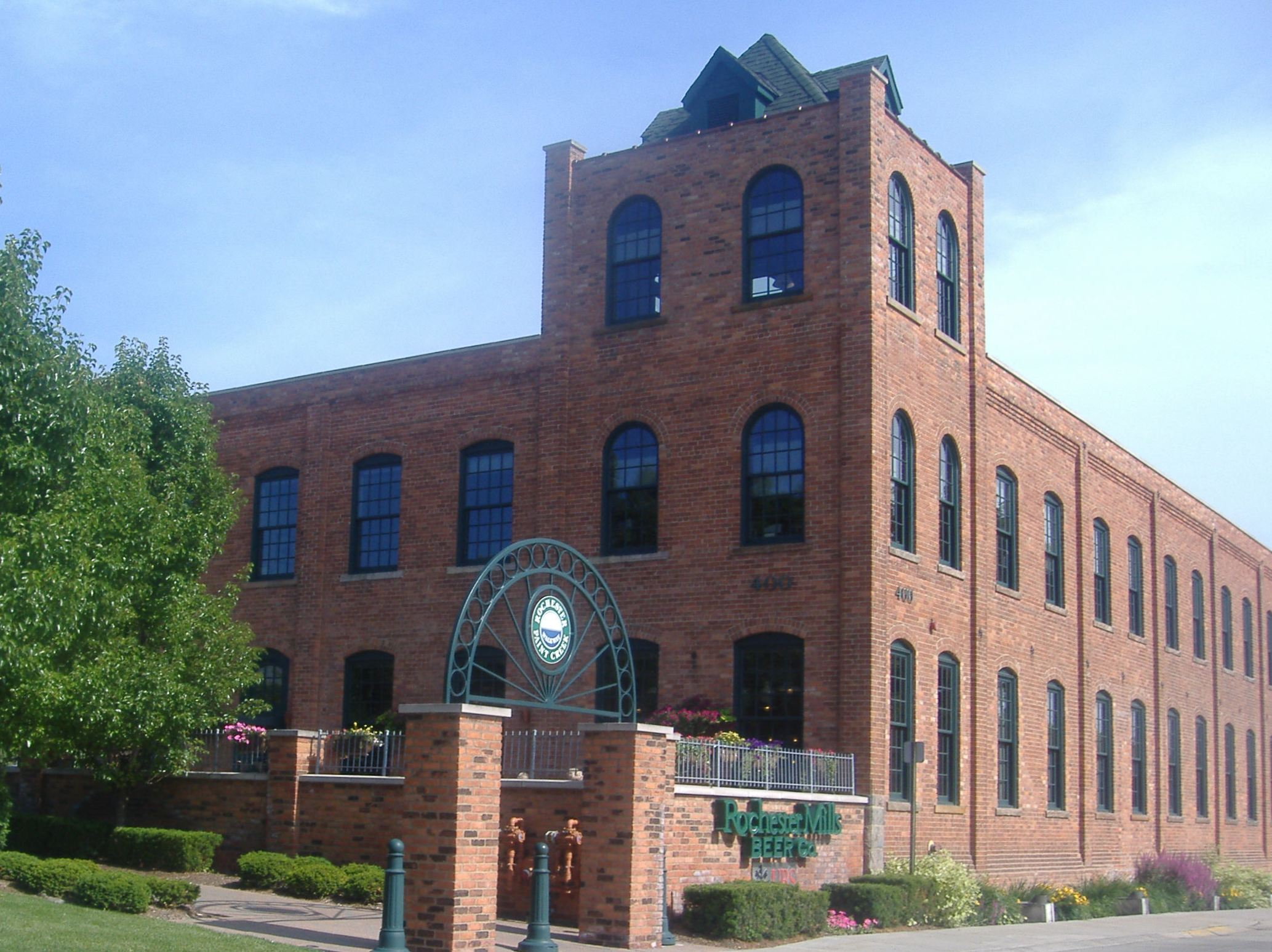
- Interactive map
- Location: 400 Water St., Rochester, Michigan
- Coordinates: 42°40′49″N 83°07′52″W
- Area: 2.8 acres (1.1 ha)
- Built: 1896
- Architectural style: Early Commercial
- NRHP reference No.: 00000646
- Added to NRHP: June 9, 2000

The Western Knitting Mills is a former industrial building located at 400 Water Street in Rochester, Michigan. The building has been renovated to serve commercial tenants, including Rochester Mills Beer Company. It was listed on the National Register of Historic Places in 2000.

== History ==
In 1844, Hosea B. Richardson built a wool carding and cloth-dressing mill at this location. This original building was destroyed by fire in 1867. A new building, the Rochester Woolen Mill, was constructed soon after, and purchased by Hosea's son Samuel Richardson, who owned the Western Knitting Works in Detroit. This new plant produced woolen goods until it too was destroyed by fire in 1882. In 1891, stockholders in the Western Knitting Works bought out Richardson, reorganized it, and changed the name to Western Knitting Mills Inc. They moved the company's headquarters to Rochester, and built another mill in Middleville, Michigan. In 1896, the company began construction of this plant in Rochester.

The original 1896 plant was constructed in a U-shape, and included a three-story watchtower on one corner, which for use by the village as a night fire watchtower. The mill measures 60,000 square feet, and had its own hydro generating station, two large warehouses and two dormitories on site, as well as a railroad spur directly onto the property. The mill made knitted wool socks, gloves and mittens until 1916, when it began making wool cloth. At some point the U-shaped factory was filled in to make a square, and in 1916 an addition was constructed to handle the cloth making. During World War I, the government commissioned the factory to make khaki gloves for U.S. soldiers.

However, after the war, business began to decline, and the mill closed in 1927. In 1929, the Bradley Knitting Company of Wisconsin purchased the factory to produce yarn and knitted cloth, but the onset of the Great Depression forced the mill to close again in 1931. It reopened briefly in 1933, but soon closed again permanently. After that, several other companies used the factory beginning in the 1940s, including McAleer Manufacturing Company, Higbie Manufacturing, Avon Tube and ITT-Higbie. The last manufacturer, ITT-Higbie, closed the plant in 1993 and sold it to private owners in 1997, who renovated it for commercial use. During and previous to the renovation, the other buildings on the property were demolished, leaving only the 1896 mill in place. The Rochester Mills Beer Company opened in the building in 1998, and as of 2024 still occupies the ground floor.

== Description ==
The Western Knitting Mills factory is a two-story, brick late nineteenth-century mill building with a square plan. The building measures 140 feet by 150 feet. The building has a built-up roof and a fieldstone foundation with a basement. The building is eight bays wide on each original elevation, with bays separated by brick pilasters projecting from the building. The north elevation, originally the interior of the U shape, has three bays on each side of the former courtyard. Each bay contains two windows set in flat arched openings. The windowsills and parapet caps are of stone. The main entry fronts into what is now a parking lot, and is topped with a high parapet and a carved name block which make it a visual focal point.

A three-story fire tower is located on one corner of the building. The original tower was demolished in the early 1900s, but it was reconstructed during the 1997-98 renovation of the building. The tower has a hipped roof with dormers on each side.

== Gallery ==
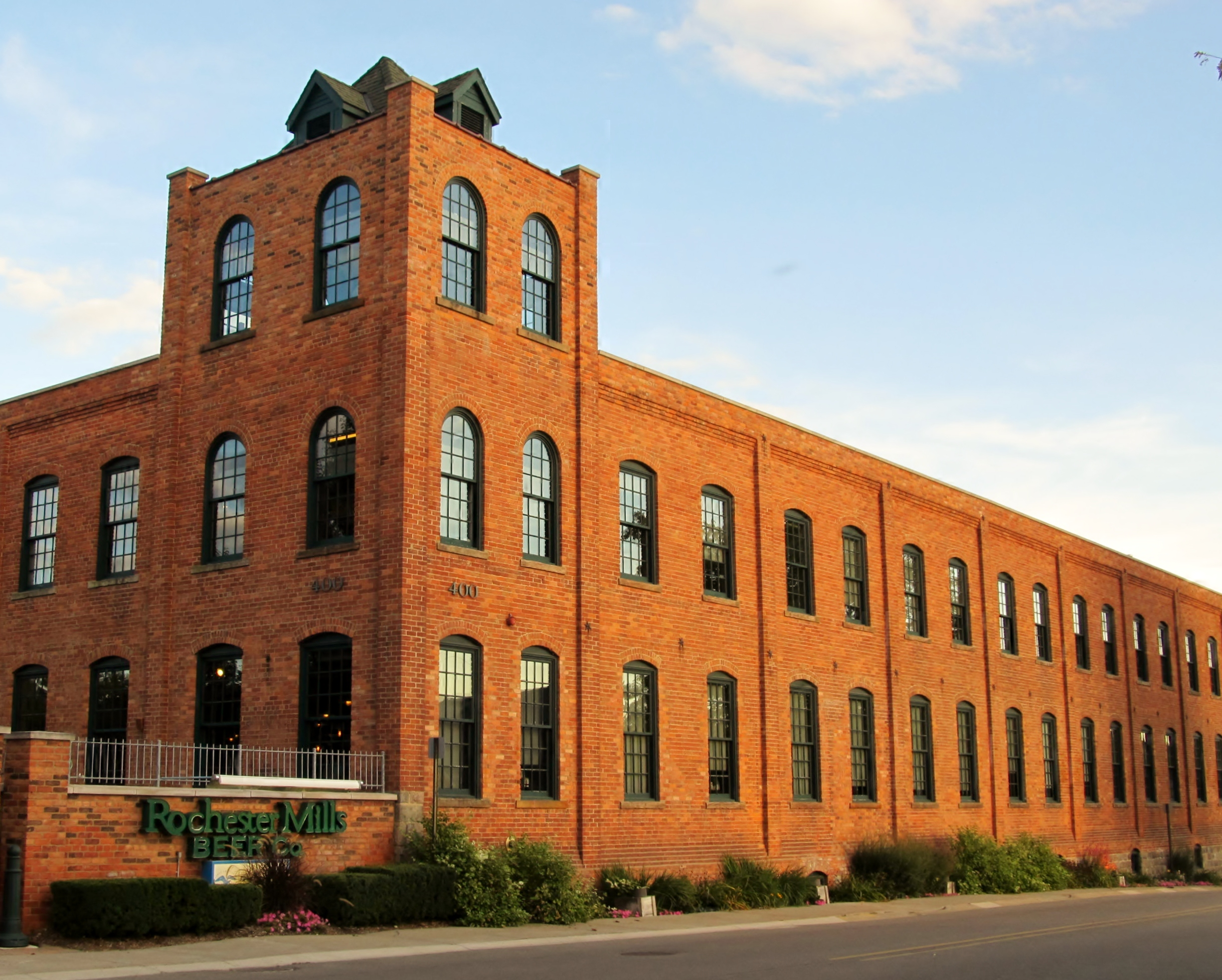

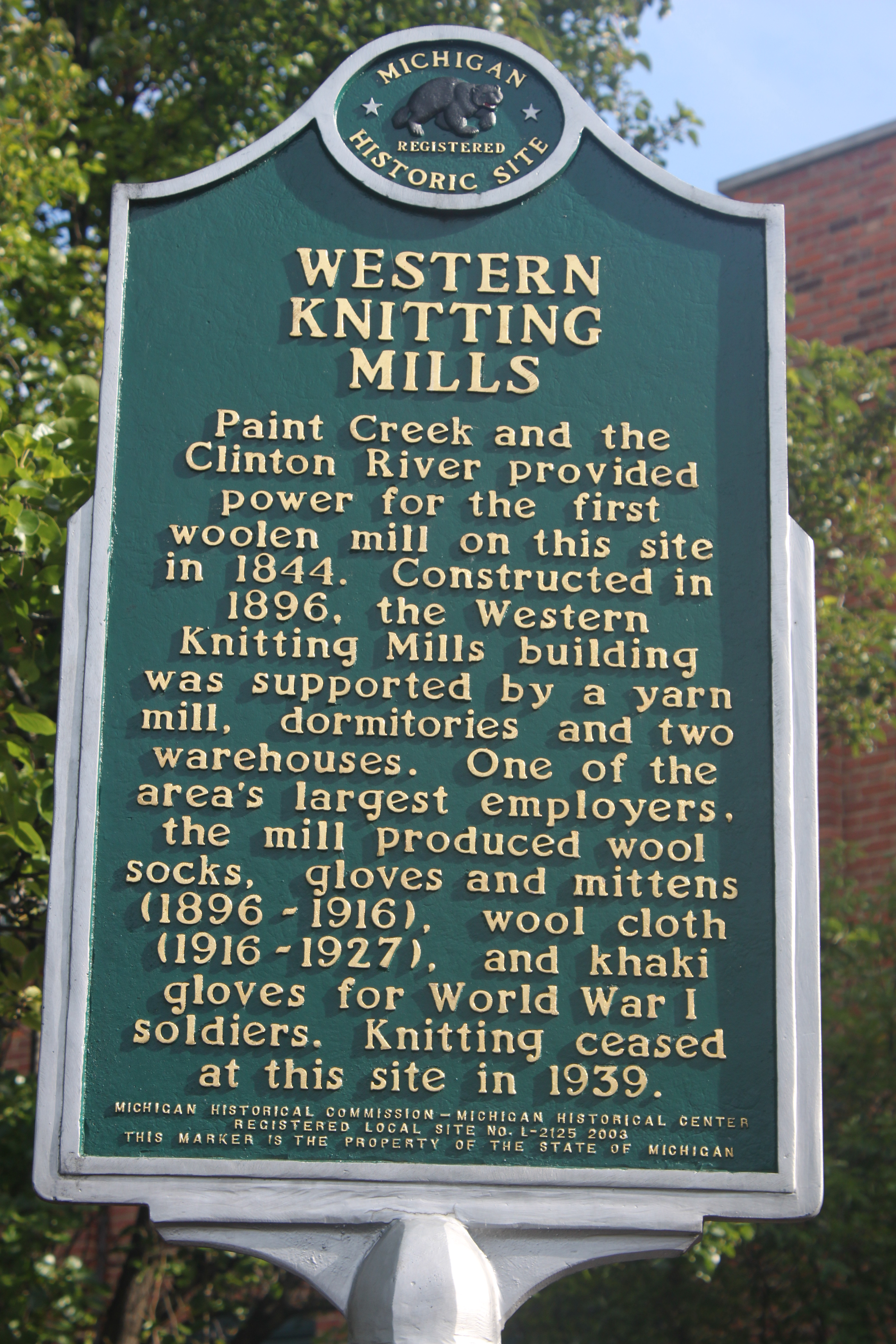

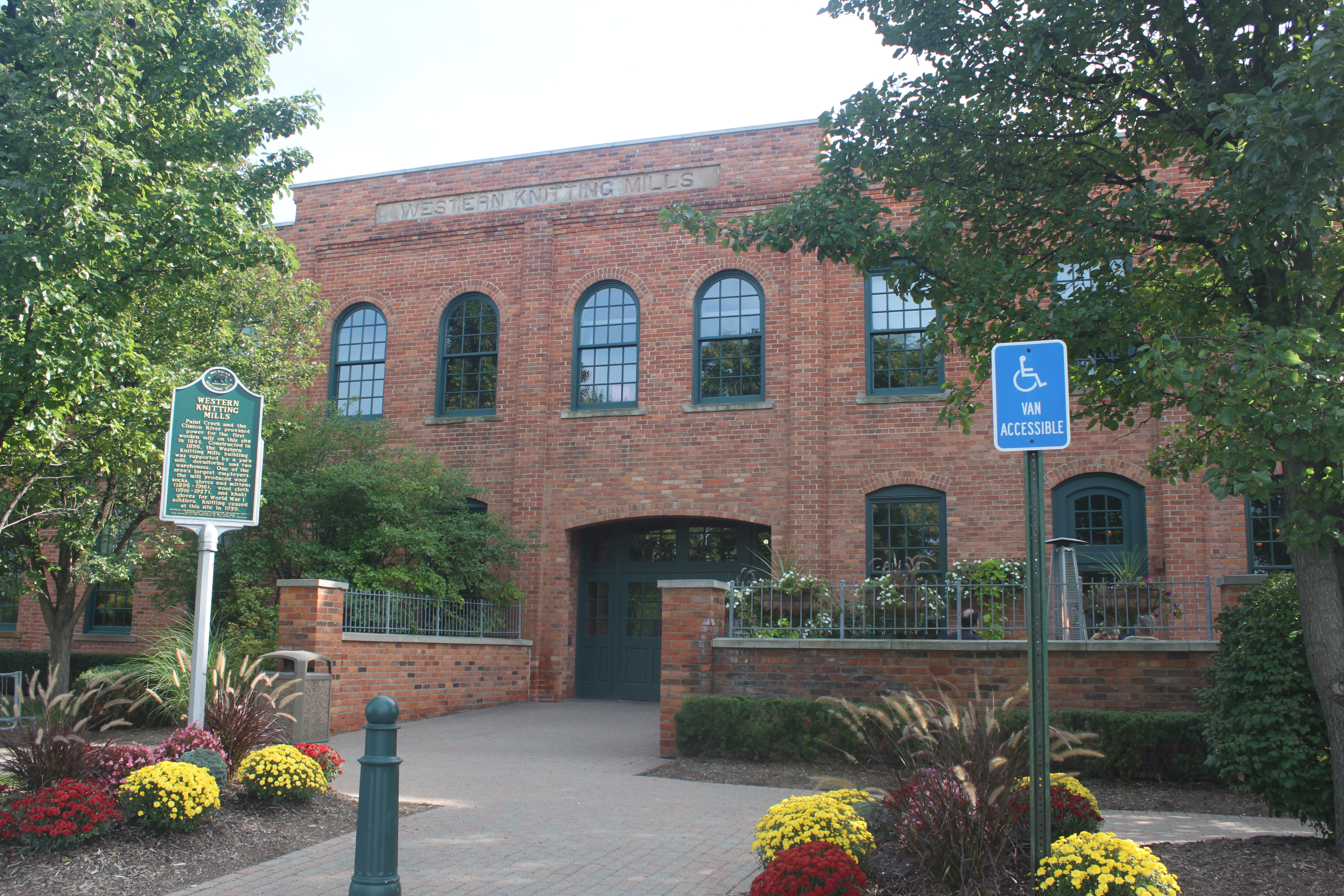

== See also ==
- National Register of Historic Places listings in Oakland County, Michigan
