= Paul Davis (basketball) =

American basketball player (born 1984)

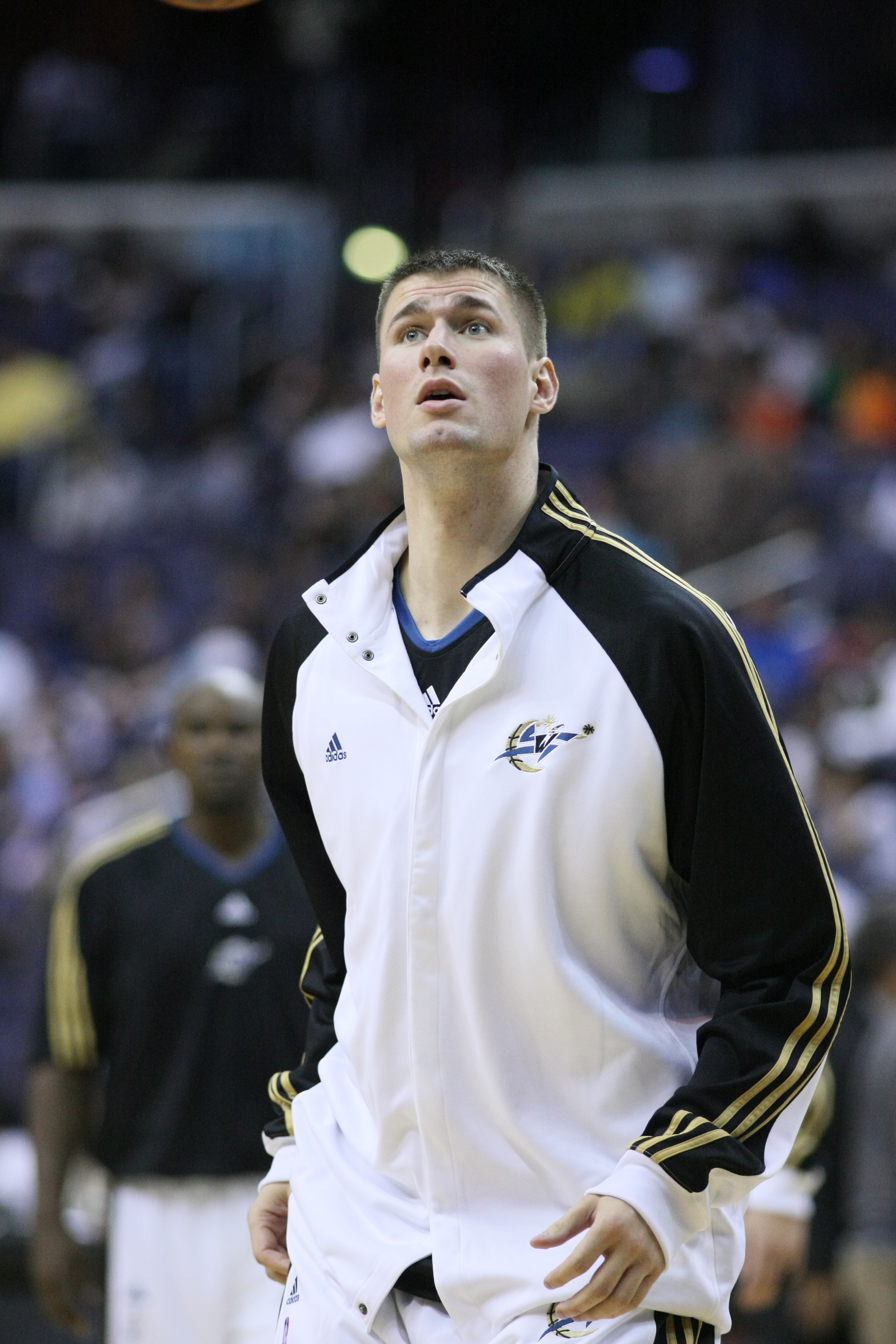
- Davis with the Washington Wizards in 2009

Personal information
- Born: July 21, 1984 (age 42) Rochester, Michigan, U.S.
- Listed height: 6 ft 11 in (2.11 m)
- Listed weight: 270 lb (122 kg)

Career information
- High school: Rochester (Rochester, Michigan)
- College: Michigan State (2002–2006)
- NBA draft: 2006: 2nd round, 34th overall pick
- Drafted by: Los Angeles Clippers
- Playing career: 2006–2016
- Position: Power forward / center
- Number: 40, 9

Career history
- 2006–2009: Los Angeles Clippers
- 2009: Washington Wizards
- 2009–2010: Maine Red Claws
- 2010: Obradoiro CAB
- 2010–2012: Cajasol Sevilla
- 2012–2016: Khimki

Career highlights
- EuroCup champion (2015); All-EuroCup Second Team (2011); First-team Parade All-American (2002); Mr. Basketball of Michigan (2002); McDonald's All-American (2002)
- Stats at NBA.com
- Stats at Basketball Reference

Paul Davis (born July 21, 1984) is an American retired professional basketball player. Standing at 6 ft 11 in (2.11 m), he played at the power forward and center positions.

== Early years ==
Davis attended Reuther Middle School where his number has been retired. Davis played for Rochester High School, earning Mr. Basketball of Michigan honors in 2002.

As a center for the Michigan State Spartans, he finished the 2005 season as the NCAA Tournament's leading rebounder. Davis was ranked as the nation's number three center by Lindy's College Basketball and the nation's number five post man by Athlon Sports.

In his senior season, he averaged 17.5 points, 9.1 rebounds, 1.6 assists, 1 steal and 0.9 blocks, while also shooting 87% from the free-throw line, and was 6–19 from three-point territory. Paul finished his college career with 1,718 points.

On April 2, 2009, Paul appeared on the Bravo show Millionaire Matchmaker.

== Professional career ==
=== NBA ===
On June 28, 2006, Davis was selected by the Los Angeles Clippers in the 2006 NBA draft with the 34th pick (4th pick of 2nd round).

After 2007–08 season, he became a restricted free agent. His rights were renounced by the Clippers, but on August 18, 2008, he was re-signed by the Clippers. He was waived by the Clippers in January 2009.

On September 25, 2009, Davis signed with the Washington Wizards. He was waived on November 11, 2009, when the Wizards signed guard Earl Boykins.

=== European clubs ===
On April 8, 2010, Davis signed with Xacobeo Blu:Sens, a Spanish ACB team. In September 2010 he signed with CB Cajasol Sevilla.

After two seasons at Seville, in May 2012 he signed a two-year deal with the Russian club BC Khimki, to join them for the EuroLeague competition. In July 2014, he re-signed with Khimki for one more season. On July 11, 2015, he signed another one-year extension with the club.

On June 27, 2016, Davis announced his retirement from professional basketball due to constant injuries.

== Personal life ==
=== Controversies ===
Davis was kicked out of a January 2026 Michigan State Spartans basketball game after "verbally abusing" a referee. Michigan State Coach Tom Izzo (who previously coached Davis) acknowledged the ejection at his after game press conference, stating "What he said, he should never say in the world. That ticked me off".

Davis expressed regret for his comments the next day, sharing he had called the official to offer his apologies.

== Career statistics ==
Legend
GP	Games played	GS	Games started	MPG	Minutes per game
FG%	Field-goal percentage	3P%	3-point field-goal percentage	FT%	Free-throw percentage
RPG	Rebounds per game	APG	Assists per game	SPG	Steals per game
BPG	Blocks per game	PPG	Points per game	PIR	Performance index rating
**Bold**	Career high

=== NBA ===
==== Regular season ====
Year	Team	GP	GS	MPG	FG%	3P%	FT%	RPG	APG	SPG	BPG	PPG
2006–07	L.A. Clippers	**31**	0	5.8	.423	.000	.700	1.4	.2	.2	.2	1.6
2007–08	L.A. Clippers	22	**1**	8.8	.369	.000	.600	2.1	.5	.3	.3	2.5
2008–09	L.A. Clippers	27	**1**	**11.9**	.408	.000	**.794**	**2.5**	.4	**.4**	.1	**4.0**
2009–10	Washington	2	0	4.0	**.500**	.000	.500	.0	**1.5**	.0	**.5**	2.5
Career		82	2	8.6	.402	.000	.732	1.9	.4	.3	.2	2.6

=== EuroLeague ===
Year	Team	GP	GS	MPG	FG%	3P%	FT%	RPG	APG	SPG	BPG	PPG	PIR
2012–13	Khimki	23	2	19.6	.605	1.000	.855	5.5	1.3	.9	1.0	13.4	16.1
Career		23	2	19.6	.605	1.000	.855	5.5	1.3	.9	1.0	13.4	16.1

=== Domestic leagues ===
Season	Team	League	GP	MPG	FG%	3P%	FT%	RPG	APG	SPG	BPG	PPG
2009–10	Maine Red Claws	D-League	16	28.5	.469	.000	.903	8.8	1.9	1.2	1.6	15.0
2009–10	Xacobeo Blu:sens	Liga ACB	6	23.8	.469	1.000	.833	7.7	1.3	1.3	.8	13.2
2010–11	Cajasol Banca Cívica	Liga ACB	33	19.8	.542	–	.748	5.3	.6	1.5	.5	13.2
2011–12	Cajasol Banca Cívica	Liga ACB	31	21.5	.540	.000	.748	7.3	1.3	1.1	.4	14.1
2012–13	BC Khimki	Russian PBL	7	13.0	.514	–	.750	3.7	.3	1.0	.9	7.6
2012–13	BC Khimki	VTB United League	20	18.6	.579	.000	.813	4.7	1.6	.7	.6	12.5
2013–14	BC Khimki	VTB United League	4	16.3	.548	–	.875	4.8	1.5	.5	.5	10.3
2014–15	BC Khimki	VTB United League	22	17.0	.575	.000	.870	4.1	1.5	1.0	.5	13.1
