= Rochester Hills, Michigan =

- City
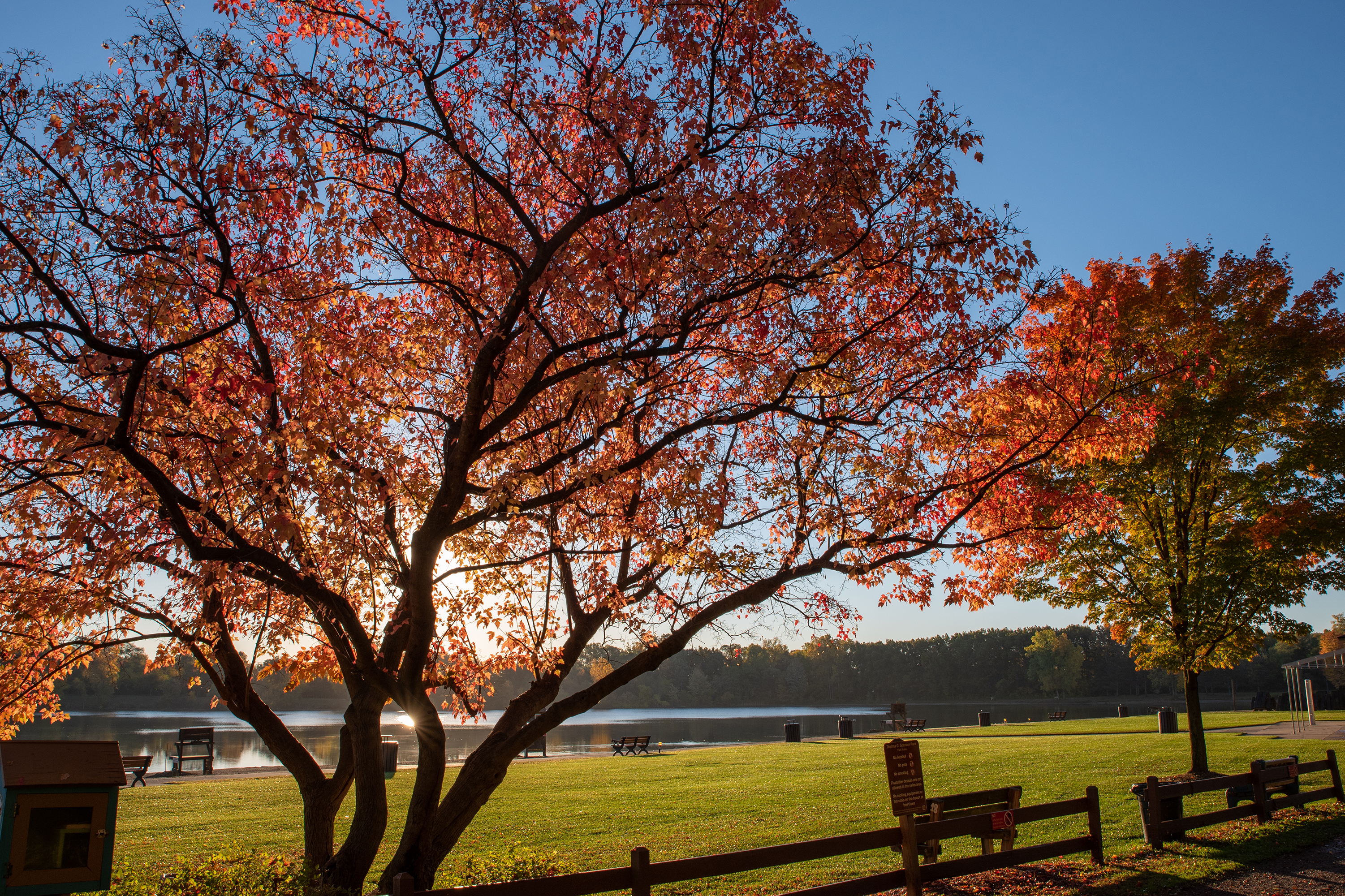

- Flag
- Interactive map of Rochester Hills, Michigan
- Location within Michigan Location within the United States
- Coordinates: 42°39′57″N 83°09′29″W
- Country: United States
- State: Michigan
- County: Oakland
- Settled: 1817
- Organized: 1835 (Avon Township)
- Incorporated: 1984 (City of Rochester Hills)

Government
  - Type: Mayor–council
  - Mayor: Bryan K. Barnett (R)
  - Clerk: Leanne Scott

Area
  - City: 32.90 sq mi (85.22 km^{2})
  - Land: 32.80 sq mi (84.96 km^{2})
  - Water: 0.097 sq mi (0.25 km^{2})
- Elevation: 820 ft (250 m)

Population (2020)
  - City: 76,300
  - Density: 2,326.0/sq mi (898.06/km^{2})
  - Metro: 4,296,250 (Metro Detroit)
- Time zone: UTC-5 (Eastern (EST))
  - Summer (DST): UTC-4 (EDT)
- ZIP code(s): 48306–48309
- Area codes: 248 and 947
- FIPS code: 26-69035
- GNIS feature ID: 1675440
- Website: www.rochesterhills.org

Rochester Hills is a city in Oakland County, Michigan, United States. A northern suburb of Detroit, Rochester Hills is located about 25 miles (40 km) north of downtown Detroit. As of the 2020 census, the city had a population of 76,300. The area was first settled by European Americans in 1817 and organized as Avon Township in 1835. The city of Rochester was incorporated in 1967, while the remaining area of Avon Township was incorporated and renamed the city of Rochester Hills in 1984.

== History ==
Prior to European settlement, the area now known as Rochester Hills was inhabited by Native Americans, namely the Potawatomi. The Potawatomi depended on the area's abundant water sources, such as the Clinton River and Paint Creek, to grow crops, fish, and travel. They resided in the area until the 1807 Treaty of Detroit caused them, along with the Odawa, Wyandot, and Ojibwe peoples, to forcibly cede their land in Southeast Michigan.

The first European settler was James Graham who arrived in 1817. Graham and his family reached the area by following trails created by the Sauk Native Americans. Avon Township was organized in 1835. Rochester incorporated as a village within the township in 1869. The township adopted a charter in 1948 under the Home Rule Act. Also in 1948 a post office was established under the name of Brooklands for the area between Auburn Road and Hamlin Road just to the west of Dequindre Road.

In 1966, village residents voted to become the City of Rochester, effective in February 1967. As a result, Rochester residents no longer had to pay property taxes to the township, as it was now a separate municipality.

In 1967, Avon Township filed a petition to become a city. In January 1968, township voters approved the petition to move forward with seeking city status. Three proposed city charters were voted down by residents, the first in March 1969, the second in May 1970, and the third in September 1971. The city of Rochester then sought to annex all of the township, which was unanimously denied by the Michigan Boundary Commission. In 1972, petitions were filed to consolidate Avon Township and Rochester. In April 1974, the consolidation petition lost by 350 votes in the township, while passing by four votes in Rochester. In May 1974, Rochester's petition to annex 2.2 square miles (5.7 km^{2}) of Avon Township was approved by the Michigan Boundary Commission, depriving Avon Township of its largest taxpayer. The township became Avon Charter Township in August 1978. Court challenges to the 1974 annexation continued until November 1981, when the township was ordered to surrender the annexed property. An impending annexation request from the City of Troy, due south, for 300 acres of southeast Avon Township brought the city hood question to a crisis.

In May 1984, township voters approved a city charter. On November 20, 1984, Avon Township became the City of Rochester Hills. The name of the new city was put to a vote, with the other choice being "Avon Hills." The name "Rochester Hills" won by a landslide with voters, based on the area's historical ties to Rochester and the rolling hills in the area. Township Supervisor Earl E. Borden became the first mayor of Rochester Hills.

In June 2024, there was a mass shooting in the city.

== Geography ==
According to the United States Census Bureau, the city has a total area of 32.91 square miles (85.24 km^{2}), of which 32.82 square miles (85.00 km^{2}) is land and 0.09 square miles (0.23 km^{2}) (0.27%) is water.

Rochester Hills is bordered to the north by Oakland Charter Township along Dutton Road, to the south by the city of Troy along South Boulevard, to the east by Shelby Township in Macomb County along Dequindre Road, and to the west by the city of Auburn Hills along part of Adams Road. Rochester Hills is also partially bordered by the city of Rochester to the east. Elevations in the city range from 690 feet (210 m) above sea level in the southeastern portion of the city to 1,032 feet (315 m) in the northwestern section.

=== Neighboring communities ===
- Stony Creek is a neighborhood on the northeast end of the city on the border with Rochester at 42°41′46″N 83°06′43″W.
- Yates is on the boundary with Rochester and Shelby Township, Oakland County (42°40′25″N 83°05′45″W ; Elevation: 669 ft./204 m.).

== Demographics ==
Historical population
Census	Pop.	Note	%±
1990	61,766		—
2000	68,825		11.4%
2010	70,995		3.2%
2020	76,300		7.5%
U.S. Decennial Census

=== 2020 census ===
As of the 2020 census, Rochester Hills had a population of 76,300. The median age was 41.7 years. 21.8% of residents were under the age of 18 and 19.0% of residents were 65 years of age or older. For every 100 females there were 95.1 males, and for every 100 females age 18 and over there were 93.1 males age 18 and over.

100.0% of residents lived in urban areas, while 0.0% lived in rural areas.

There were 29,711 households in Rochester Hills, of which 30.9% had children under the age of 18 living in them. Of all households, 58.5% were married-couple households, 15.1% were households with a male householder and no spouse or partner present, and 22.8% were households with a female householder and no spouse or partner present. About 26.3% of all households were made up of individuals and 13.1% had someone living alone who was 65 years of age or older.

There were 31,208 housing units, of which 4.8% were vacant. The homeowner vacancy rate was 0.7% and the rental vacancy rate was 9.6%.

Racial composition as of the 2020 census
Race	Number	Percent
White	55,546	72.8%
Black or African American	2,813	3.7%
American Indian and Alaska Native	217	0.3%
Asian	11,570	15.2%
Native Hawaiian and Other Pacific Islander	19	0.0%
Some other race	1,219	1.6%
Two or more races	4,916	6.4%
Hispanic or Latino (of any race)	3,614	4.7%

=== 2010 census ===
As of the census of 2010, there were 70,995 people, 27,578 households, and 19,308 families residing in the city. The population density was 2,163.2 inhabitants per square mile (835.2/km^{2}). There were 29,494 housing units at an average density of 898.7 per square mile (347.0/km^{2}). The racial makeup of the city was 89.1% White, 2.5% African American, 0.2% Native American, 4.5% Asian, 0.7% from other races, and 1.9% from two or more races. Hispanic or Latino residents of any race were 1.1% of the population.

There were 27,578 households of which 33.2% had children under the age of 18 living with them, 59.2% were married couples living together, 8.1% had a female householder with no husband present, 2.8% had a male householder with no wife present, and 30.0% were non-families. 25.7% of all households were made up of individuals and 10.3% had someone living alone who was 65 years of age or older. The average household size was 2.53 and the average family size was 3.08.

The median age in the city was 40.9 years. 23.7% of residents were under the age of 18; 7.7% were between the ages of 18 and 24; 24.6% were from 25 to 44; 30.3% were from 45 to 64; and 13.8% were 65 years of age or older. The gender makeup of the city was 48.4% male and 51.6% female.

== Government ==
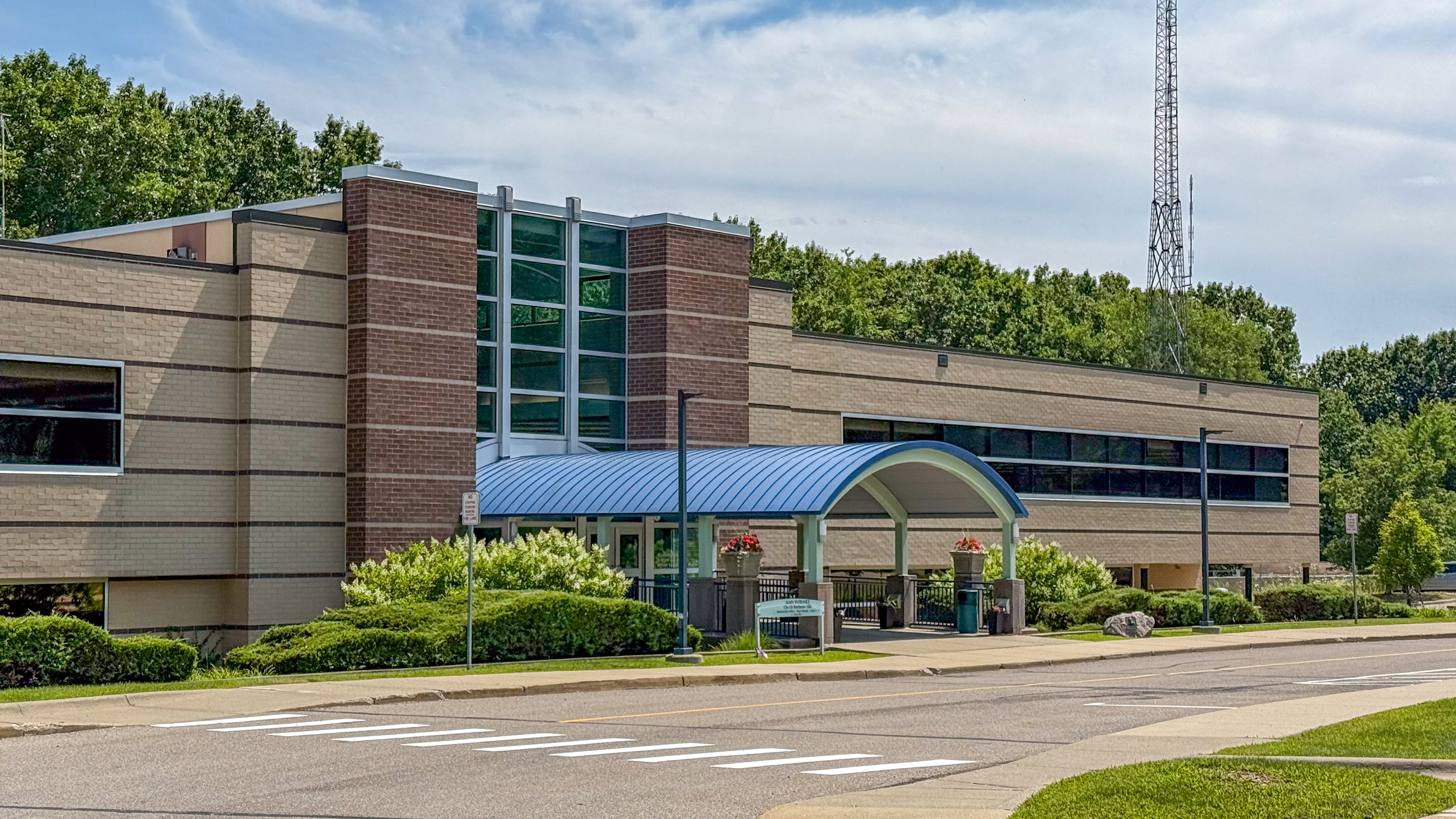
Rochester Hills City Hall

Rochester Hills has a mayor-council government. The Rochester Hills City Council consists of seven Council Members: four district members and three at-large members. They are elected to four-year terms and, due to term limiting, can serve no more than two terms for a maximum of eight years. However, there are no limits on how many times the mayor can run for re-election as a write-in candidate.

Rochester Hills does not have a police department, so the city's police services are provided by the Oakland County Sheriff's Office. The 52nd District Court Division Three is also located in Rochester Hills.

In the 2020 United States presidential election in Michigan, 23,173 (50.67%) votes went to Joseph Biden and 21,680 (47.4%) votes were cast for Donald Trump.

=== Federal, state, and county legislators ===
United States House of Representatives
District	Representative	Party	Since
10th	John James	Republican	2023

Michigan Senate
District	Senator	Party	Since
9th	Michael Webber	Republican	2023

Michigan House of Representatives
District	Representative	Party	Since
55th	Mark Tisdel	Republican	2021 (Note: Tisdel has represented Rochester Hills since 2021, but has only represented the 55th district since 2023.)

Oakland County Board of Commissioners
District	Commissioner	Party	Since
4	Brendan Johnson	Democratic	2023
5	Michael Spisz	Republican	2013
6	Michael Gingell	Republican	2007

== Education ==
Rochester Community Schools serve most of the city. Rochester Adams High School, Rochester High School, and Stoney Creek High School are in Rochester Hills. The city also hosts college and graduate-level programs in various disciplines at Oakland University and Rochester Christian University.

Some portions of the city, however, are in the Avondale School District. Much of the ASD portion of Rochester Hills is zoned to Deer field Elementary School, also within the city. Other portions are zoned to Auburn Elementary School in Auburn Hills and Woodland Elementary School in Troy. All ASD residents are zoned to Avondale Middle School in Rochester Hills and Avondale High School in Auburn Hills. Avondale GATE Magnet School, The Meadows School, Avondale Academy, and the ASD transportation department are all in Rochester Hills.

City services include Rochester Hills Public Library. (The neighboring City of Rochester and Oakland Township contract with the City of Rochester Hills to permit their residents' use of the library.)

The Japanese School of Detroit, a supplementary school for Japanese citizens of school age, at one time had its administrative offices in the former Oakland Steiner School in Rochester Hills.

== Notable people ==
This list includes people from Rochester and Rochester Hills:

- Abdul El-Sayed, politician and epidemologist
- Alec Martinez, professional hockey player
- Amy Frazier, professional tennis player
- Andrew Good, professional baseball player
- Bob Keselowski, NASCAR driver
- Brad Keselowski, NASCAR driver
- Brian Keselowski, NASCAR driver
- Brian Lindstrom, filmmaker and economics specialist
- Brian Sell, marathoner
- Craig Owens, lead singer of Chiodos and Cinematic Sunrise
- Dita von Teese, burlesque artist, model and actress
- Elmore Leonard, novelist and screenwriter
- Eminem, rapper
- Eric Fisher, professional football player
- George Zamka, NASA astronaut and Marine Corps pilot
- George Jamison, professional football player
- Greg and Tim Hildebrandt, fantasy artists and painters of the original Star Wars movie poster
- Hal Foster, artist and writer
- Haley Stevens, politician
- Idris Goodwin, playwright, poet, activist, professor
- Jacob Trouba, hockey player
- Jana Kramer, country music singer and actress
- Jason Varitek, professional baseball player
- Jay Gibbons, professional baseball player
- Karen Moncrieff, actress, director and screenwriter
- Karen Newman, anthem singer for the Detroit Red Wings
- Kayden Pierre, soccer player
- Madonna, singer, songwriter, record producer, and actress
- Mike Bishop, politician
- Paul Davis, professional basketball player
- Peter Vanderkaay, Olympic gold medal swimmer
- Robert Simpson Woodward, physicist and mathematician
- Ron Teachworth, educator, artist, writer and filmmaker
- Roxy Petrucci, drummer of Vixen
- Rude Jude, television and radio personality
- Shawn Hare, professional baseball player
- Tommy Clufetos, professional drummer
- Walt Kowalczyk, professional football player
