= List of mayors of Rochester Hills, Michigan =

The office of mayor of Rochester Hills, Michigan has been the city's chief executive since its elevation from Avon Township on November 20, 1984. The current, and most notable, mayor is Bryan Barnett who has been incumbent since 2006.

== List of Mayors of Rochester Hills ==
Mayor	Term begins	Term ends	Notes
Earl Borden	1984	1985	City’s first mayor. Former Supervisor for Avon Township. Died after just 9 months in office aged 53.
Billie Ireland	1985	1995	Elected to the Avon Township Board in 1980, served the remainder of Mayor Borden’s term. Proceeded to win re-election twice before retiring.
Kenneth Snell	1995	1999	Served on the Rochester Hills City Council from 1984-1991 and again from 1993-1995 before being elected mayor.
Patricia Somerville	1999	2006	Won her election through a massive grassroots movement where she personally knocked on most doors in the city. Stepped down as mayor shortly before the end of her second term due to health concerns.
Bryan Barnett	2006	Incumbent	Former city councilmen, appointed to serve the remaninder of Somerville's term, has won four additional terms running as a write in for two elections. Also former President United States Conference of Mayors from 2019-2020.
