= Rollin Sprague Building =

- Rollin Sprague Building-Old Stone Store
- U.S. National Register of Historic Places
- Michigan State Historic Site
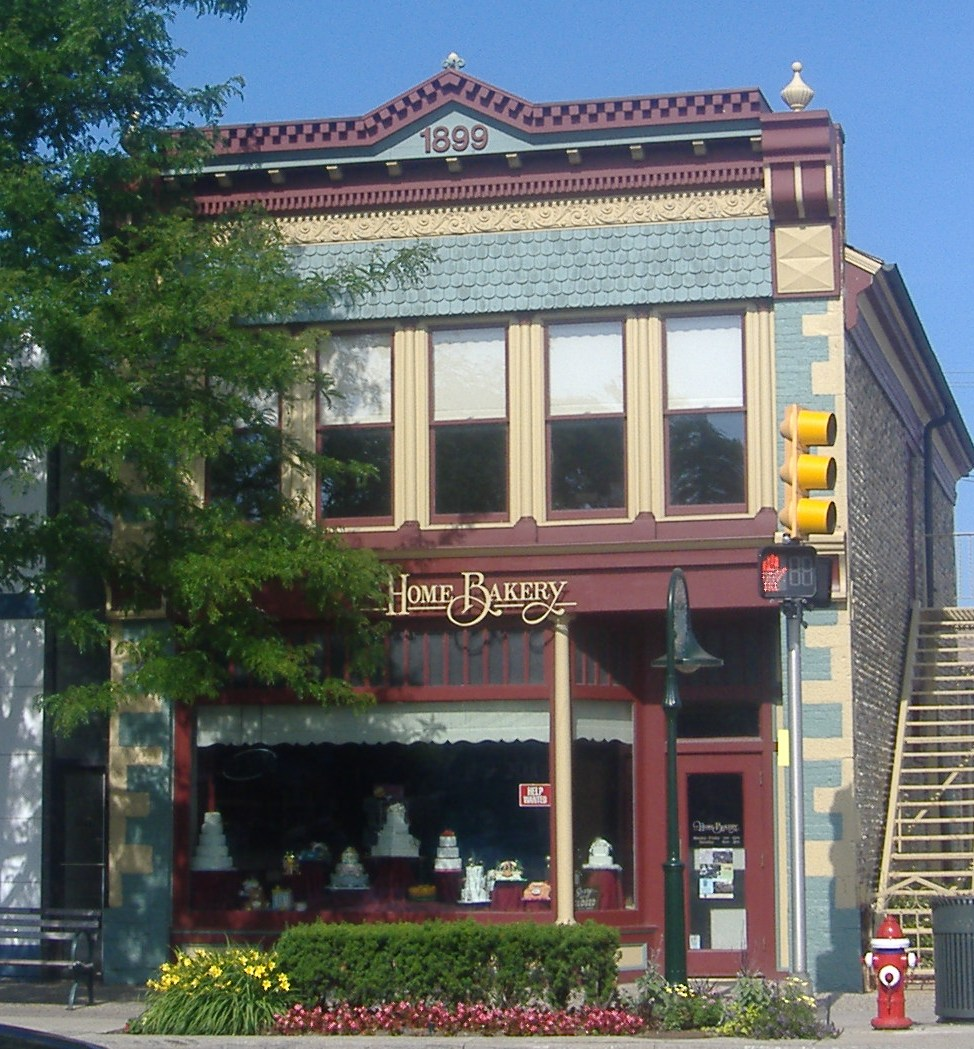
- Interactive map
- Location: 300 Main St., Rochester, Michigan
- Coordinates: 42°40′46″N 83°08′00″W
- Area: less than one acre
- Built: 1849
- Built by: Thomas Anscomb
- Architectural style: Greek Revival, Late Victorian
- NRHP reference No.: 99000474
- Added to NRHP: April 22, 1999

The Rollin Sprague Building, also known as the Old Stone Store, is a commercial building located at 300 Main Street in Rochester, Michigan. It was listed on the National Register of Historic Places in 1999. The building is a rare example of coursed, cobblestone construction, and is the only known commercial building in Michigan featuring this type of construction.

== History ==
Rollin Sprague was born in Ontario County, New York in 1806. He moved with his family to Oakland County by 1821, and by 1831 was a prominent local physician. in that year, he opened a drug store in Rochester in a partnership with his father-in-law, David Cooper. The drugstore was located in what was previously Rochester's first schoolhouse, and remained in that building until 1849, when Sprague commissioned the construction of this building. The mason who built it was Thomas Anscomb, an English-born stonemason living in Troy Township.

Dr. Sprague died in 1872 and left his business to his wife, Adeline Cooper Sprague. She continued to operate it until 1875, when she sold it to Barnes & Goodison, who operated it as a general store. In 1899, the front facade of the building was remodeled. Barnes & Goodison continued to use the building as a dry goods store and drug store until 1904. It later housed an auto dealership and a dairy. In 1947, Harry Schaefer and Donald Bennett opened the Scha-Ben bakery in the building, which later became the Home Bakery. The bakery has occupied the building since.

== Description ==
The Rollin Sprague Building is a two-story gable front commercial building with walls of coursed cobblestone construction. The building sites on a fieldstone foundation The rear and side walls are of cobblestone with corner quoins, while the current front facade replicates a Late Victorian pressed metal facade constructed in 1899. The original front facade was likely of Greek Revival styling, constructed of coursed cobblestones in the same manner as the sides and rear. The current facade features a single storefront on the first floor, with five, tall double-hung windows on the second and a cornice above.

== See also ==
- National Register of Historic Places listings in Oakland County, Michigan
