= Bryan Barnett (politician) =

American politician

Mayor Bryan Barnett

5th Mayor of Rochester Hills, Michigan
- Incumbent
- Assumed office 2006
- Preceded by: Patricia Somerville

77th President of the United States Conference of Mayors
- In office 2019–2020
- Preceded by: Stephen K. Benjamin
- Succeeded by: Greg Fischer

Rochester Hills city councilmen
- In office 2000–2006

Personal details
- Party: Republican
- Website: mayor

Bryan K. Barnett is an American politician currently serving as mayor of Rochester Hills, Michigan. He has held office since 2006 as a Republican. He also served as the president of the United States Conference of Mayors from 2019 to 2020.

== Political career ==
=== Rochester Hills city council ===
Barnett served on the city council for Rochester Hills for six years between 2000 and his election as mayor in 2006.

=== Mayor of Rochester Hills ===
Barnett was appointed mayor in 2006 to serve the remainder of mayor Pat Somerville's term when she resigned due to poor health. He would be elected to the office in 2007. During his tenure he has worked to improve the quality of life in the city. It has been named the safest city in Michigan with a population over 70,000, and it's consistently ranked in the top 25 best cities to live in the United States. In order to achieve this high standard of living, Barnett is known for his bipartisanship, consistently working with Democratic mayors and with the state government in Lansing. He has also sought to improve local participation in municipal government by running events and festivities, increasing local attendance to his speeches from just 30 individuals to over a thousand. He also led the city through the COVID-19 pandemic and promoted a "rebound" effort for people to spend more time in public parks as opposed to in-home quarantine, resulting in a 300% increase in park usage in a year.

In Rochester Hills, mayors can only be on the ballot for two terms for a major party. However, Barnett has successfully run for three more terms as a write-in candidate, bypassing the term limit. In 2019 he won with 8,251 of the 9,156 votes cast, with an additional 720 votes being invalid write-ins with his name spelled wrong. In 2023 he was re-elected with 11,029 write-in votes of 16,986 total votes.

=== Congressional campaign ===
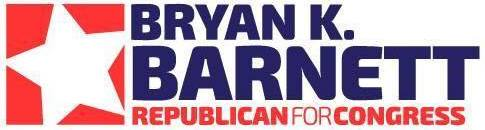
2014 Congressional campaign logo

Barnett announced his candidacy to stand for a United States House of Representatives seat in 2014 for Michigan's District 8. However, he withdrew after just 25 days to focus on his mayoral re-election campaign, endorsing eventual winner Mike Bishop.

=== President of United States Conference of Mayors ===
Barnett was selected to serve as the president of the United States Conference of Mayors from 2019 to 2020. The association is non-partisan with every mayor of a city whose population is larger than 30,000 being invited to be a member. Barnett's selection, as mayor of the relatively small Rochester Hills, was seen as representative of his efforts to improve quality of life in his city. As president, he acted as the Conference's mouthpiece during the beginning of the COVID-19 pandemic. During which he advocated for $250 billion in federal spending to cities to counteract the 88% shortfall in city revenues across the country.
