= Going Back (film) =

- DVD cover image
- Directed by: Ron Teachworth
- Written by: Ron Teachworth
- Produced by: Ron Teachworth; Jill Teachworth
- Starring: Bruce Campbell; Christopher Howe; Perry Mallette; Susan Waderlow Yamasaki
- Cinematography: John Prusak
- Edited by: Christa Kindt; Wayne Wahrman
- Music by: Denny Brown
- Production company: R S T Productions
- Distributed by: Bifrost Distribution (DVD)
- Release date: 1983
- Running time: 79 minutes
- Country: United States
- Language: English

Going Back is a 1983 American independent drama film written and directed by Ron Teachworth and starring Bruce Campbell and Christopher Howe. It was Campbell's second feature film, produced shortly after The Evil Dead.

The film had been extremely rare to acquire for a number of years, due to contract disputes between the director, producer, and the bankrupt original distributor. It was finally re-released on DVD in October 2006. The DVD release features an additional audio commentary track by Campbell, director Teachworth and cinematographer John Prusak.

== Plot ==
In 1964, two high school friends, Brice (Campbell) and Cleveland (Howe), leave their suburban neighborhood near Detroit, Michigan to hitch-hike their way to the countryside before going off to college. They are befriended by a lonely farmer, Jack Bodell (Perry Mallette), who offers them a place to stay. As days pass, Cleveland helps Jack around the farm and finds in him the father figure he lacks, while Brice falls in love with a local girl named Cindy (Susan Waderlow-Yamasaki). Four years later, Brice and Cleveland meet up in their senior year of college and decide to "go back" to Jack's farm, where they find much has changed in just a few years.

== Cast ==
Actor	Character
Bruce Campbell	Brice Chapman
Christopher Howe	Cleveland "Clee" Neal
Perry Mallette	Jack Bodell
Susan Waderlow-Yamasaki	Cindy
Vern Teachworth	Cindy's Father

== Production ==
The movie was filmed in Cass City, Michigan, Rochester Hills, Michigan, and parts of Tennessee.

Several of the stories told in the movie by the Brice and Jack characters actually happened to director Ron Teachworth.

The woman kissing her son Cleveland good-bye (at the beginning of the film) is played by the actor's real mother, Noralee Howe.

== Reception ==
Going Back received mixed reviews from critics and audiences. Susan Leighton of 1428elm.com gave some praise, stating, "Going Back is a sheer delight for anyone who has enjoyed Bruce Campbell’s works throughout the years. In his second film, you start to see flashes of the actor that he would become. In this performance, he is less stilted and more natural. There is an ease to him which makes his effort as Brice believable." MaryAnn Johanson of FlickFilosopher.com was more critical ("it’s just a little too like a shorthand version of the things it wants to say...about how young people see the world through a gauze of idealism"), but she did praise the cinematography of John Prusak (who would later serve as cinematographer for Michael Moore's Roger & Me).
