= Rochester Oral History Archive =

History Archive

The Rochester Oral History Archive (ROHA) Project is based in Rochester, Michigan. ROHA's goal is to collect memories about the city of Rochester and compile them in a publicly accessible, digital format. The project benefits not only residents of Rochester but also non-residents who are interested in the city's history.

ROHA is funded by grants from both the Meadow Brook Writing Project, part of the National Writing Project, and Building the Civic ‘Net, an initiative that gives grants to projects that find creative ways to engage in civic culture using the internet.

Residents of Rochester aged 55 and older are invited to share their memories via digital recording sessions at collection events or privately scheduled interviews. Researchers use a provided list of prompts to interview residents, whose memories are recorded in mp3 format and donated to the Rochester Oral History Archive. ROHA then uploads these files to the project website where they can be accessed by the general public.

First year composition students at Oakland University have the opportunity to participate as interviewers.
