= Stoney Creek High School =

High school in Rochester Hills, Michigan, United States

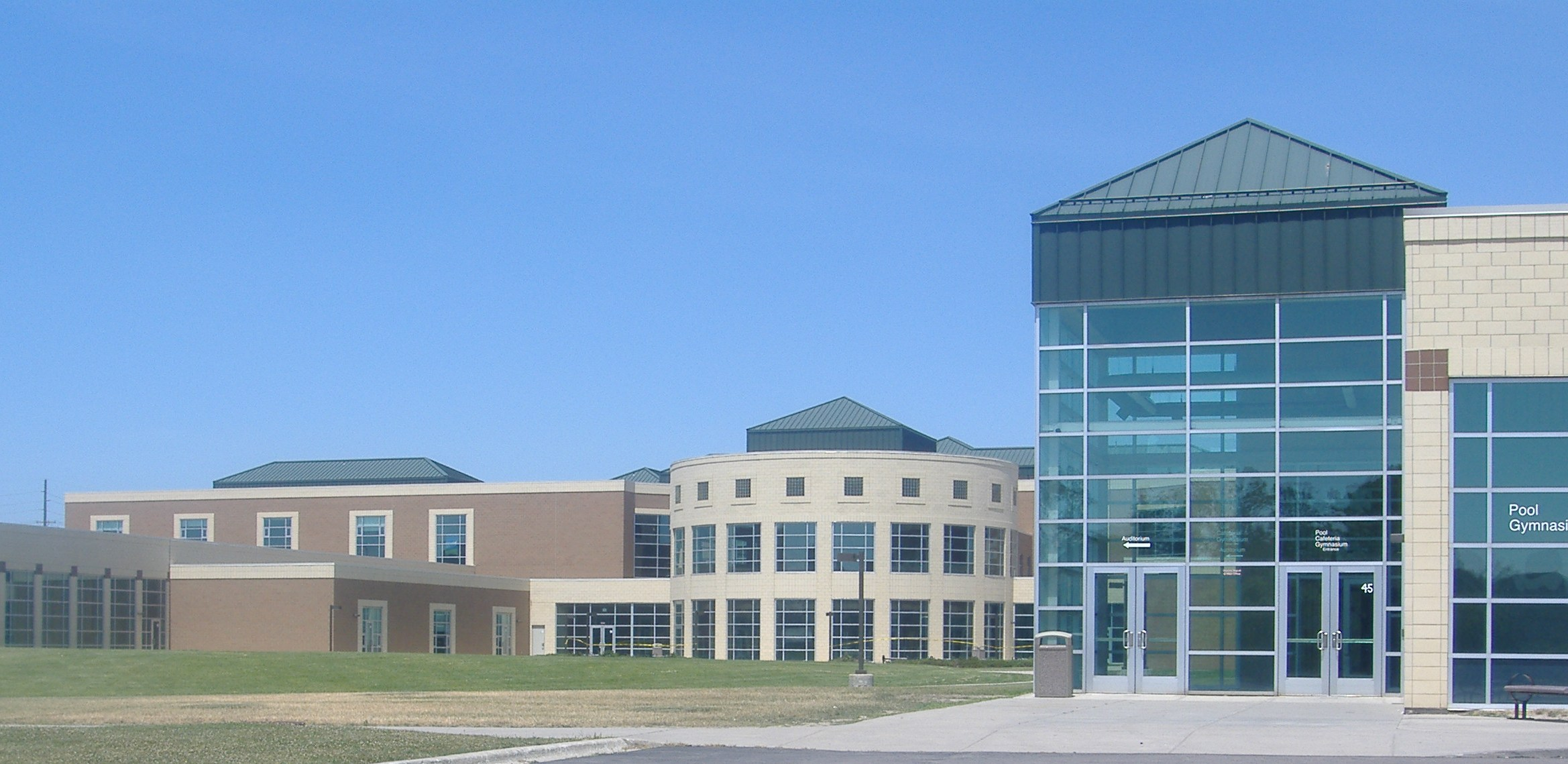

Location
- 6755 Sheldon Road; Rochester Hills, Michigan 48306; United States; 42.7°N 83.1223°W

Information
- Type: Public high school
- Established: 2001
- School district: Rochester Community Schools
- Principal: Brian Shelson
- Teaching staff: 70.21 (FTE)
- Grades: 9–12
- Enrollment: 1,496 (2023-2024)
- Student to teacher ratio: 21.29
- Colors: Vegas Gold and Millennium Blue
- Nickname: Stoney
- Newspaper: The Source
- Yearbook: The Cougar Tales
- Website: Stoney Creek High School

Student assessments
- 2021–22 school year Change vs. prior year

M-STEP 11th grade proficiency rates (Science / Social Studies)
- Advanced %: 20.0 / 20.3
- Proficient %: 35.4 / 40.3
- PR. Proficient %: 15.7 / 32.0
- Not Proficient %: 28.9 / 7.4

Average test scores
- SAT Total: 1101.9 (▼ −28.9)

Stoney Creek High School is a public high school located in Rochester Hills, Michigan and is part of the Rochester Community Schools school district.

== History ==
Construction began in 1997 when voters approved a bond issue for building improvements in the growing district. The school board decided to name the school after the nearby historic village of Stony Creek. The 420,000 sq ft (39,000 m^{2}) high school opened in 2001 at a total cost of $64 million. The building first housed Rochester Adams students when their school was being renovated. It later housed Rochester High School Students in the 2001–2002 school year. The building also housed North Hill Elementary students when their school was receiving extensive renovations in the 2002–2003 school year but, the elementary students only attended class in half of the school while the other half was used by students of Stoney Creek. The building similarly housed Hart Middle School students when their school underwent renovations in the 2018–2019 school year.

The school began renovations in 2019 after the district funding bond, including a remodel of the media center.

The first principal was Daniel Hickey, who retired in 2009. The second principal of Stoney Creek High School was Larry Goralski, who was named the Michigan Association of Student Councils (MASC) Principal of the Year in 2010. Dr. Cathryn Skedel served as principal from 2014 to 2020. Brian Shelson is the current principal.

== Extracurricular activities ==
=== Athletics ===
Stoney Creek High School has various boys and girls sports in the fall, winter, and spring seasons.

	Fall	Winter	Spring
Boys	Cross Country; Soccer; Tennis; Football	Basketball; Skiing; Wrestling; Hockey; Swim/Dive	Baseball; Lacrosse; Golf; Track & Field; Volleyball
Girls	Swim/Dive; Cross Country; Golf; Volleyball; Tennis	Basketball; Skiing; Cheerleading	Soccer; Lacrosse; Softball; Track & Field

The varsity football program is currently under head coach Nick Merlo, who originated the "Armor Up" theme in 2018. He coached the cougars to a playoff appearance in 2019 and a district finals appearance in 2020, along with Stoney Creek's first-ever undefeated regular season in 2020.

The school's competitive cheer team has one the District 1 state championship multiple times, with three victories in a row in 2024, 2025, and 2026, also having won the championship in 2010 and 2019.

=== Music program ===
Stoney Creek's Chamber Singers have performed several times at the Michigan Music Conference in Grand Rapids, MI. In 2012 they also performed at the ACDA convention in Fort Wayne, IN. The Wind Ensemble group has also performed at the Michigan Music Conference.

The choral program at Stoney has led students to sing with the Detroit Symphony Orchestra, Rochester Symphony Orchestra, Toronto Symphony Orchestra, and the Detroit Chamber Winds

Stoney Creek's Marching Band has held numerous performances at the Joe Louis Arena. The combined instrumental programs were also invited to perform at Walt Disney World in 2015.

Stoney Creek has two winter guard teams competing in the Michigan Color Guard Circuit. The school also hosts regional competitions through MCGC.

=== Theatre program ===
The Stoney Creek Theatre Company produces three shows throughout the school year. The Fall Play (September–November), the Winter One Act (December–February), and the Spring Musical (February–May). Currently, the SCHS Theatre Program is under the direction of Kayvon Kashani-Gharavi.

== Notable alumni ==
- Eric Fisher - NFL offensive tackle
- Alec Martinez - NHL defenceman
- Thiago David Olson - electrical engineer and entrepreneur
- Lauren Zakrin - Broadway actress
