= Ron Teachworth =

American artist, writer and film director

- Education: Central Michigan University, Wayne State University, Utica Community Schools
- Occupations: Artist, writer and film director

Ronald S. Teachworth is an American artist, writer, and film director from Rochester Hills, Michigan.

== Personal ==
Teachworth received his B.A. in fine art from Central Michigan University in 1968, and an M.A. from Wayne State University in Detroit in 1972. In the 1970s and 1980s, he worked as a high school art and filmmaking teacher, primarily in the Utica Community Schools district of southeast Michigan. Later, he served as an administrator in the same district. In recent years, he has returned to his teaching roots, serving numerous college and community programs. Most recently, Mr. Teachworth has published a collection of short stories called Beyond: A Collection of Metaphysical Short Stories, and the 2014 novel The Annunciation. He has had a retrospective visual art exhibition at the University of Michigan. In 2014 he founded the Detroit Art Review that covers all the museums and galleries in Southeastern Michigan and is a member of AICA-USA. He now writes and paints full-time.

== Artwork ==
Teachworth's work in painting, watercolor, and collage has been featured in six solo exhibitions (five in Michigan, one in New York) and over 30 group exhibitions.

== Film ==
Teachworth's most notable film is the 1983 release Going Back, for which he directed and wrote the screenplay. The film is a coming-of-age nostalgia piece that features many of Teachworth's own life experiences. It stars Bruce Campbell (The Evil Dead, Army of Darkness, Bubba Ho-Tep, Burn Notice) and Christopher Howe (Rookie of the Year, Timequest), and takes place in 1964 rural Michigan. Teachworth re-acquired the distribution rights to Going Back after it spent nearly 20 years in limbo as part of the back-catalog of bankrupt distributor Vestron Video, allowing for its re-release on DVD in 2006.

== Books ==
After writing the screenplay for Going Back, Teachworth started writing fiction. His first published work was the children's book Two Stones. It was later followed by a collection of short stories called Beyond. As of 2014, Teachworth has written three other novels: The Mound, An Attraction Beyond Vows, and his most recent work, The Annunciation.

- Two Stones (children's book) (2008)
- The Mound (children's book) (2011)
- Beyond: A Collection of Metaphysical Short Stories (2013)
- The Annunciation (2014)

== Sources ==
- Official Going Back Website – Contains synopsis, history of film, production stills, link to the trailer
- Ron Teachworth's Official Website – About writer/director/artist Ron Teachworth
- http://www.ronteachworthliterary.com/ – about literary work
