= Rochester Community Schools (Michigan) =

School district in Michigan, United States

- RCS Logo from 2017-present

Address
- 5285 Dequindre Rochester Hills, Michigan, 48307; United States

District information
- Type: Public
- Grades: PreK–12
- Established: 1949
- President: N/A (Jayson Blake as Acting President)
- Vice-president: Jayson Blake
- Superintendent: Nicholas Russo
- Schools: 22 schools, including 13 elementary schools, 4 middle schools, 3 high schools
- Budget: Operating expenditures 2023-2024 $227,354,503
- NCES District ID: 2629940

Students and staff
- Students: 14,868 (2024–2025)
- Teachers: 771.2 (on an FTE basis) (2024-2025)
- Staff: 2,057.37 FTE (2024-2025)
- Student–teacher ratio: 19.28 (2024-2025)

Other information
- Website: www.rochester.k12.mi.us

Rochester Community Schools (RCS) is a public school district in Metro Detroit in the U.S. state of Michigan, serving Rochester, most of Rochester Hills and Oakland Township, and small portions of Auburn Hills, Orion Township, Shelby Township, and Washington Township. As of the 2023–24 academic year, the district enrolled 14,980 students.

== History ==
Prior to 1949, there were several small school districts within the current district's boundaries. Each district had a single school that did not include high school grades, whereas the school district in Rochester itself included a high school. Because of Avon Township's rising population and the need for students to be guaranteed a high school education, the small districts consolidated with the Rochester district in April 1949. The new district was called Rochester Community Schools and it consolidated the following districts: Rochester, Avon, Brewster, Hamlin, and Ross.

The district population was expanding rapidly by 1952, and the district needed to plan more buildings. However, there were still eight other small school districts in the township whose consolidation would affect the district's long-range planning. Pending the agreement of the districts, the RCS school board voted on October 15, 1952 to annex the following districts: Baldwin, Stoney Creek, Brooklands, Kline, Snell, and Brush. Bigler and Mount Vernon school districts, who did not have schools of their own but sent both funds and students to Rochester Schools, were also on the list. On December 15, 1952, the districts voted to be annexed, with Kline school district (in the area of Rochester Road and Stoney Creek Road) the only holdout. The Kline district was ultimately annexed, (Note: The exact date of annexation remains unclear due to a lack of available sources.) and the district boundaries became roughly what they are today.

=== Budget crisis ===
Like nearby school districts such as Avondale, RCS faced a budget crisis in the early 1980s. The district projected a $1.9 million deficit for the 1983-84 school year ($6.1 million in 2024 dollars). The crisis, as well as changing housing patterns, led to the closure of two historic elementary schools in June 1983, Woodward (1926) and Hamlin (1929). Woodward Elementary, at 312 Woodward Ave in Rochester, housed the Older Person's Commission until being demolished in 2003. Hamlin Elementary reopened in 1984 and has since been renovated.

=== Controversy ===
In 2022, a civil rights lawsuit was filed against then-Superintendent Robert Shaner and the school district accusing him of spying on parents through social media and challenging their right to free speech. The district reached a settlement that stipulated all parties keep settlement terms confidential, and no admission of liability. Shaner resigned from the district in 2023. Later, Shaner sued the district for improperly firing him in August 2023 and was awarded a judgement of $732,631 for damages in 2025.

=== Board of Education ===
As of March 2026, the Board of Education consists of Michelle Bueltel (Secretary), Barbara Anness (Trustee), Julie Alspach (Treasurer), Carol Beth Litkouhi (Trustee, Censured), Jayson Blake (President, Acting), and Shelley Lauzon (Trustee), with a spot open for a potential candidate.

== Schools ==
Enrollment Comparison by School (1977 vs. 2023-2024)
School	1977 Enrollment	2023-2024 Enrollment
Elementary Schools
Baldwin	618	534
Brewster		399
Brooklands	543	482
Delta Kelly		620
Hamlin	547	476
Hampton		543
Hugger		511
Long Meadow	685	544
McGregor	570	451
Meadow Brook	590	402
Musson		494
North Hill	561	511
University Hills	557	403
Woodward	314	
Middle Schools
Hart		1016
Reuther	755	670
Van Hoosen	535	904
West	909	807
High Schools
John M Schultz		68
Rochester Adams High School	1964	1539
Rochester High School	1250	1671
Stoney Creek High School		1495
