= Rochester Adams High School =

Public school in Michigan, United States

Location
- 3200 West Tienken Road; Rochester Hills, MI 48306; United States; 42.695881°N 83.197366°W

Information
- School type: Public high school
- Established: 1969 (building opened in 1970)
- School district: Rochester Community Schools
- Superintendent: Nicholas Russo
- Principal: Luke Swanson
- Faculty: 68.80 (on an FTE basis)
- Grades: 9-12
- Enrollment: 1,539 (2023-2024)
- Student to teacher ratio: 22.37
- Colors: Brown and Gold
- Athletics conference: Oakland Activities Association
- Nickname: Highlanders
- Newspaper: The Kilt
- Website: Rochester Adams High School

Student assessments
- 2021–22 school year Change vs. prior year

M-STEP 11th grade proficiency rates (Science / Social Studies)
- Advanced %: 28.4 / 26.3
- Proficient %: 34.3 / 34.3
- PR. Proficient %: 13.1 / 31.7
- Not Proficient %: 24.2 / 7.7

Average test scores
- SAT Total: 1164.9 (▼ −7)

Rochester Adams High School (also known as Adams High School, Adams, or AHS) is a public high school located in Rochester Hills, Michigan, and is part of the Rochester Community Schools district.

== Academics ==
Rochester Adams High School has been accredited by the Cognia or its predecessors since 1971.

== Demographics ==
The demographic breakdown of the 1,539 students enrolled for 2023-24 was:

- Boys - 49%
- Girls - 51%
- Native American/Alaskan - 0.1%
- Asian - 16.8%
- Black - 2.7%
- Hispanic - 6.3%
- Native Hawaiian/Pacific islanders - 0.1%
- White - 70.6%
- Multiracial - 3.3%

5% of the students were eligible for free or reduced-cost lunch.

== Athletics ==
Adams has various boys and girls sports in the fall, winter, and spring seasons.

	Fall	Winter	Spring
Boys	Cross Country; Soccer; Tennis; Football	Basketball; Skiing; Wrestling; Hockey; Swim/Dive	Baseball; Lacrosse; Golf; Track & Field
Girls	Swim/Dive; Cross Country; Golf; Volleyball; Cheerleading	Basketball; Skiing; Cheerleading; Gymnastics	Soccer; Lacrosse; Softball; Tennis; Track & Field

== Notable alumni ==
=== Entertainers and musicians ===
- Tommy Clufetos (born 1979), drummer for Black Sabbath, Ozzy Osbourne, Rob Zombie, Alice Cooper and Ted Nugent
- Joe Henry (born 1960), singer/songwriter/record producer
- Robert Hurst (born 1964), jazz musician
- Jamison Jones, actor
- Jana Kramer (born 1983), actress/singer
- Madonna (born 1958), entertainer/singer/actress/producer
- Karen Moncrieff (born 1963), actress/director
- Christopher Yost (born 1973, class of 1991), screenwriter

=== Athletes ===
- Michelle Berube (born 1966), USA Olympian at the 1984 and 1988 Olympics.
- Amy Frazier (born 1972), professional female tennis player
- Shawn Hare (born 1967), former professional baseball player
- J. P. Reese (born 1980), professional MMA fighter
- Mary Jo Sanders (born 1974, class of 1992), professional female boxer
- Jacob Trouba (born 1994), defenseman and captain for the New York Rangers
- Alex Vanderkaay (born 1986), NCAA swimming champion in the 400-yard individual medley
- Peter Vanderkaay (born 1984), Olympic Gold Medalist swimmer
- Katherine Vibert (born 1999), Olympic Silver Medalist and 2019 World Champion in weightlifting.

=== Other ===
- Mike Bishop (born 1967), former U.S. Representative from Michigan's 8th congressional district
- George D. Zamka (born 1962, class of 1980), NASA astronaut
- David Shaw (American football) (Born 1972), American football coach who is currently the passing game coordinator for the Detroit Lions of the National Football League (NFL)
