= Andrew Good =

American baseball player (born 1979)

- Pitcher
- Born: September 19, 1979 (age 45); San Diego, California, U.S.
- Batted: Right Threw: Right

MLB debut
- April 18, 2003, for the Arizona Diamondbacks

Last MLB appearance
- April 20, 2005, for the Detroit Tigers

MLB statistics
- Win–loss record: 5–4
- Earned run average: 5.30
- Strikeouts: 75
- Stats at Baseball Reference

Teams
- Arizona Diamondbacks (2003–2004); Detroit Tigers (2005)

Andrew Richard Good (born September 19, 1979) is an American former professional baseball pitcher. He played in Major League Baseball (MLB) for the Arizona Diamondbacks and Detroit Tigers.

== Career ==
Good is a 1998 graduate of Rochester High School where he was taken in the 8th round of the 1998 MLB draft.

Good made his major league debut in 2003 for the Arizona Diamondbacks, pitching in 16 games, 10 starts. In 2004, he pitched mainly out of the bullpen, appearing in 17 games. He was acquired by the Detroit Tigers in the offseason, spending most of the 2005 season with the Triple-A Toledo Mud Hens. Good played in two games for the Tigers in 2005.

In 2006, Good played in the Washington Nationals organization for the Triple-A New Orleans Zephyrs. In 2007, Good pitched in 3 games for the Triple-A Syracuse Chiefs in the Toronto Blue Jays organization, starting one game and relieving in two more.

In 2012, Good took up a teaching job in Michigan at North Hill Elementary School as a fifth grade teacher. He worked there until 2020 when he began work as an 8th grade history teacher at Hart Middle School where he continues to work to this day.
