= Paint Creek Trail =

Linear park in Oakland County, Michigan, US

Coordinates: 42.72936°N 83.1596°W

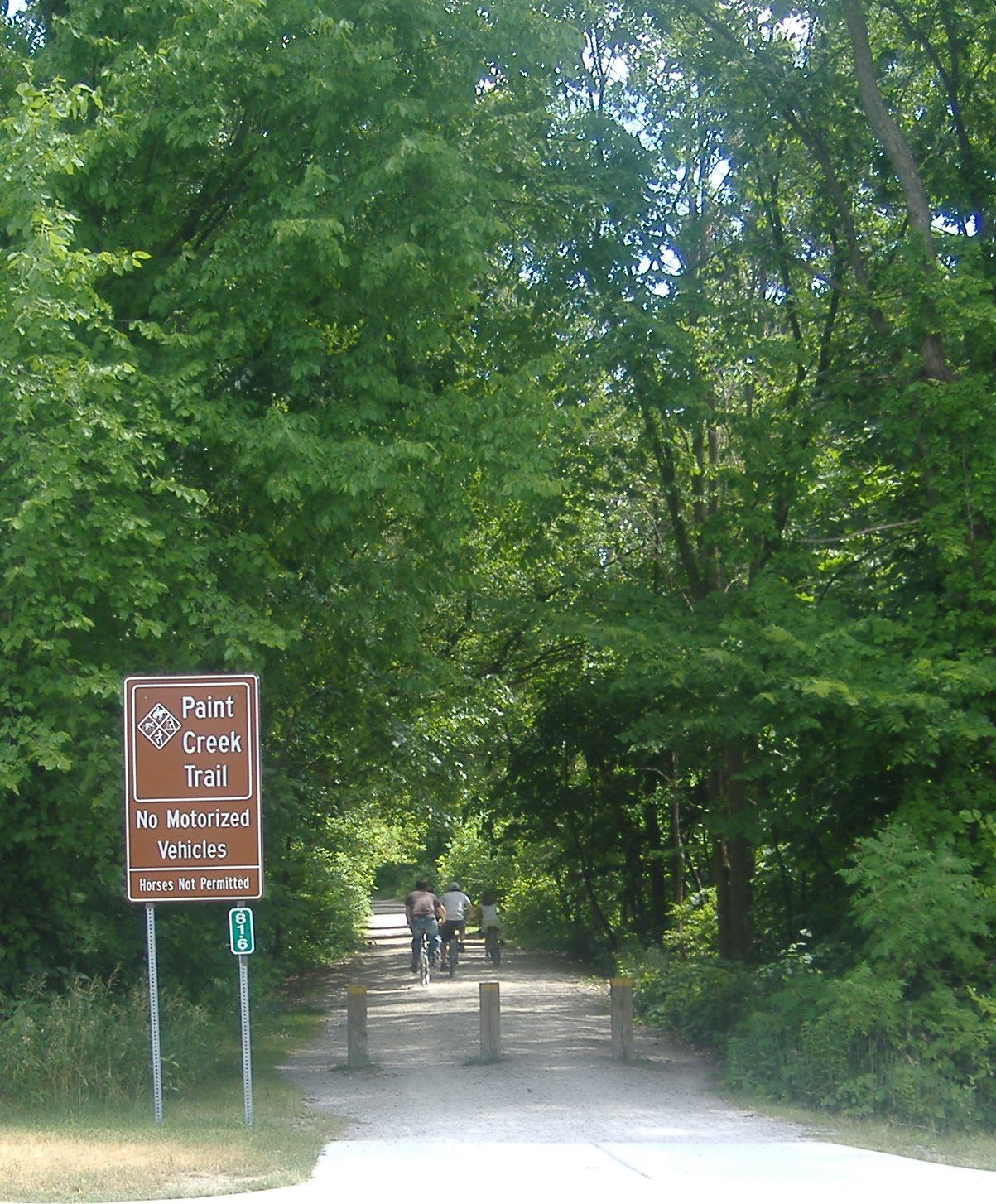
- Road crossing at Paint Creek Trail
- Length: 8.9 mi (14.3 km)
- Location: Michigan, United States
- Trailheads: Rochester, Michigan; Lake Orion, Michigan
- Use: Hiking, Cycling, Horseback
- Elevation change: negligible
- Difficulty: Easy
- Season: All
- Sights: Paint Creek, Goodison, Michigan
- Hazards: Severe weather Poison ivy

Paint Creek Trail is an 8.9-mile (14.3 km) rail trail linear park in northeast Oakland County, Michigan. The course of the park generally follows Paint Creek, a stream that flows southeast towards the Clinton River.

The trail is composed of crushed limestone and has a slope of 2% going south to north, and has a width of 8 feet. The trail is administered and funded through an inter-government commission representing the townships that the trail services.

Paint Creek Trail was named a National Recreation Trail in 2006.

== History ==
Paint Creek Trail opened in 1983 as the first rail trail in Michigan. The trail is in the right-of-way of the former Michigan Central Railroad and Penn Central Railroad lines. The original rail line was completed in 1872, and was in service until Penn Central's railroad operations were taken over by Conrail in 1976. The right-of-way was purchased by the Paint Creek Trail Commission in 1983 for $450,000.

== Route ==
The trail starts at Lake Orion, then stops at South Lake Orion, Goodison Orion Road, Goodison Collins Road, Goodison Tower Road, then all stops to North Rochester Hills, then South Rochester Hills, Rochester. The unincorporated village of Goodison is located within the Oakland Township boundaries. The trail also crosses into Bald Mountain Recreation Area.

== Activities ==
The trail is used for a combination of recreation and exercise, with activities such as walking, jogging, running, cycling, and horseback riding. Motor vehicles are not permitted. The trail is conducive to other outdoor activities such as geocaching and bird watching; as well as trout fishing in Paint Creek. 1 station had already opened in 1983 and others are under construction.
