= Script =

Script may refer to:

== Glyph display ==
- Script, a distinctive writing system, based on a repertoire of specific elements or symbols, or that repertoire
- Script (styles of handwriting)
  - Script typeface, a typeface with characteristics of handwriting
- Script (Unicode), historical and modern scripts as organised in Unicode glyph encoding

== Text documents ==
- Manuscript, any written document, often story-based and unpublished
- Play (theatre), the story, dialogue and stage directions for a theatrical production
- Rob Wagner's Script, a defunct literary magazine edited and published by Robert Leicester Wagner (1872–1942)
- Screenplay, the story, dialogue, action and locations for film or television
- Script (comics), the story and dialogue for a comic book or comic strip
- Script (video games), the narrative and text of a video game

== Computing ==
- Scripting language, in which computer programming scripts are written
- SCRIPT (markup), a text formatting language developed by IBM
- script (Unix), a command that records a terminal session
- Script, a description of procedural knowledge used in script theory, also used in artificial intelligence

== Medical and psychological ==
- SCRIPT (medicine), a standard for electronically transmitted medical prescriptions
- SCRIPT (mnemonic), a memory aid related to heart murmurs
- Behavioral script, a sequence of expected behaviors
- Life (or childhood) script, in transactional analysis
- Medical prescription (abbreviated Rx, scrip, or script), official health instructions

== Law ==
- SCRIPT (AHRC Centre), the Scottish Centre for Research in Intellectual Property and Technologies
- Narrative crime script, a step-by-step account of the processes involved in a criminal event

== Music ==
- The Script, an Irish band
  - The Script (album), their 2008 debut album
- ”Scripted”, a song by Zayn from Icarus Falls

== See also ==
- Transcript (disambiguation)
- Scrip, any currency substitute
- Scripps (disambiguation)
- Scripted (company), an online marketplace for businesses and freelance writers
