= Scripps =

Scripps may refer to:

== People ==
- Edward W. Scripps (1854–1926), American publisher and media financier
- Ellen Browning Scripps (1836–1932), American philanthropist, half-sister of Edward W. Scripps
- James E. Scripps (1835–1906), American newspaper publisher, brother of Ellen Browning Scripps
- Samuel H. Scripps (1927–2007), American philanthropist in theater and dance, grandson of Edward W. Scripps
- Anne Scripps (1946–1993), heiress to the Scripps newspaper publishing and great-great granddaughter of James E. Scripps
- Charles Scripps (1920–2007), chairman of the board of the E. W. Scripps Company and grandson of Edward W. Scripps
- Dan Scripps, American politician
- John Locke Scripps (1818–1866), attorney, journalist, and author. First cousin once removed of E.W. Scripps
- John Martin Scripps (1959–1996), British serial killer
- Natalee Scripps (born 1978), New Zealand cricketer
- William Edmund Scripps (1882–1952), American founder of WWJ radio, son of James E. Scripps

== Organizations and enterprises ==
- E. W. Scripps Company, American media conglomerate founded by Edward W. Scripps
  - Scripps Center, office building owned by E. W. Scripps Company in Cincinnati, Ohio, U.S.
  - Scripps Howard Foundation, the corporate foundation of the E. W. Scripps Company
  - Scripps National Spelling Bee, annual American competition sponsored by E. W. Scripps Company
  - Scripps Networks, American digital multicasting division of E. W. Scripps Company
  - Scripps Networks Interactive, American cable TV media company spun-off from E. W. Scripps Company
- Scripps Health, a not-for-profit, community-based health care delivery network in San Diego, California, U.S.
- Scripps Institution of Oceanography, an ocean and earth science institution in San Diego, California, U.S.
- Scripps League Newspapers, a newspaper publishing company in the United States founded by Josephine Scripps in 1921
- Scripps Research, American medical research facility
- Scripps-Booth, early 20th century American automobile company

== Places ==
- Scripps Canyon, underwater gorge in the Pacific Ocean off the coast of southern California
- Scripps Coastal Reserve, reserve located west of UC San Diego in La Jolla Farms
- Scripps Cottage, part of the campus of San Diego State University in San Diego, California, U.S.
- Scripps Formation, a geologic formation in coastal San Diego County, California
- Scripps Heights, heights on the east coast of Palmer Land, Antarctica
- Scripps Mansion, personal estate of William Edmund Scripps in Lake Orion, Michigan, U.S.
- Scripps Ranch, San Diego, community in San Diego, California, U.S.

== Schools ==
- Scripps College, women's college in Claremont, California, U.S.
- Scripps College of Communication, a division of Ohio University, U.S.
  E. W. Scripps School of Journalism, part of the college
