= Transcription =

Transcription refers to the process of converting sounds (voice, music etc.) into letters or musical notes, or producing a copy of something in another medium, including:

== Genetics ==
- Transcription (biology), the copying of DNA into RNA, often the first step in gene expression
  - Abortive transcription, the generation of very short RNA transcripts which are not used and rapidly degraded
  - Bacterial transcription, the generation of RNA transcripts of the genetic material in bacteria
  - Eukaryotic transcription, the process of copying the genetic information stored in DNA into RNA in eukaryotes
  - Reverse transcription, the process of copying the genetic information stored in RNA into DNA in viruses
  - Transcription (journal), an academic journal about genetics
  - Transcription factor, a protein that controls the rate of transcription of genetic information from DNA to messenger RNA

== Music ==
- Transcription (music), notating, converting musical sound into visual musical notes (for any purpose)
  - Piano transcription, a common type of music transcription

== Broadcasting ==
- Electrical transcription, recording of a radio program for future use by the same or another broadcaster
  - Transcription disc, such a recording as cut, and for technical reasons not suitable for domestic replay
  - BBC Transcription Services, distribution service of programmes by the British broadcaster under licence conditions

== Speech transcription ==
The process of converting spoken words into text, such as in:

linguistics

- Transcription (linguistics), the representations of speech or signing in written form
  - Orthographic transcription, a transcription method that employs the standard spelling system of each target language
  - Phonetic transcription, the representation of specific speech sounds or sign components

service and software

- Transcription (service), a service or business that converts speech into text
- Transcription (software), software that aids the conversion of speech into text

other

- Medical transcription, the process of converting a health professional's voice-recorded comments into a text document

== Other ==
- Transcription (Atkinson novel), a 2018 novel by Kate Atkinson
- Transcription (Lerner novel), a 2026 novel by Ben Lerner

== See also ==
- Transcript (disambiguation)
