= Oakland Charter Township, Michigan =

Oakland Township, Michigan
- Charter township
- Charter Township of Oakland
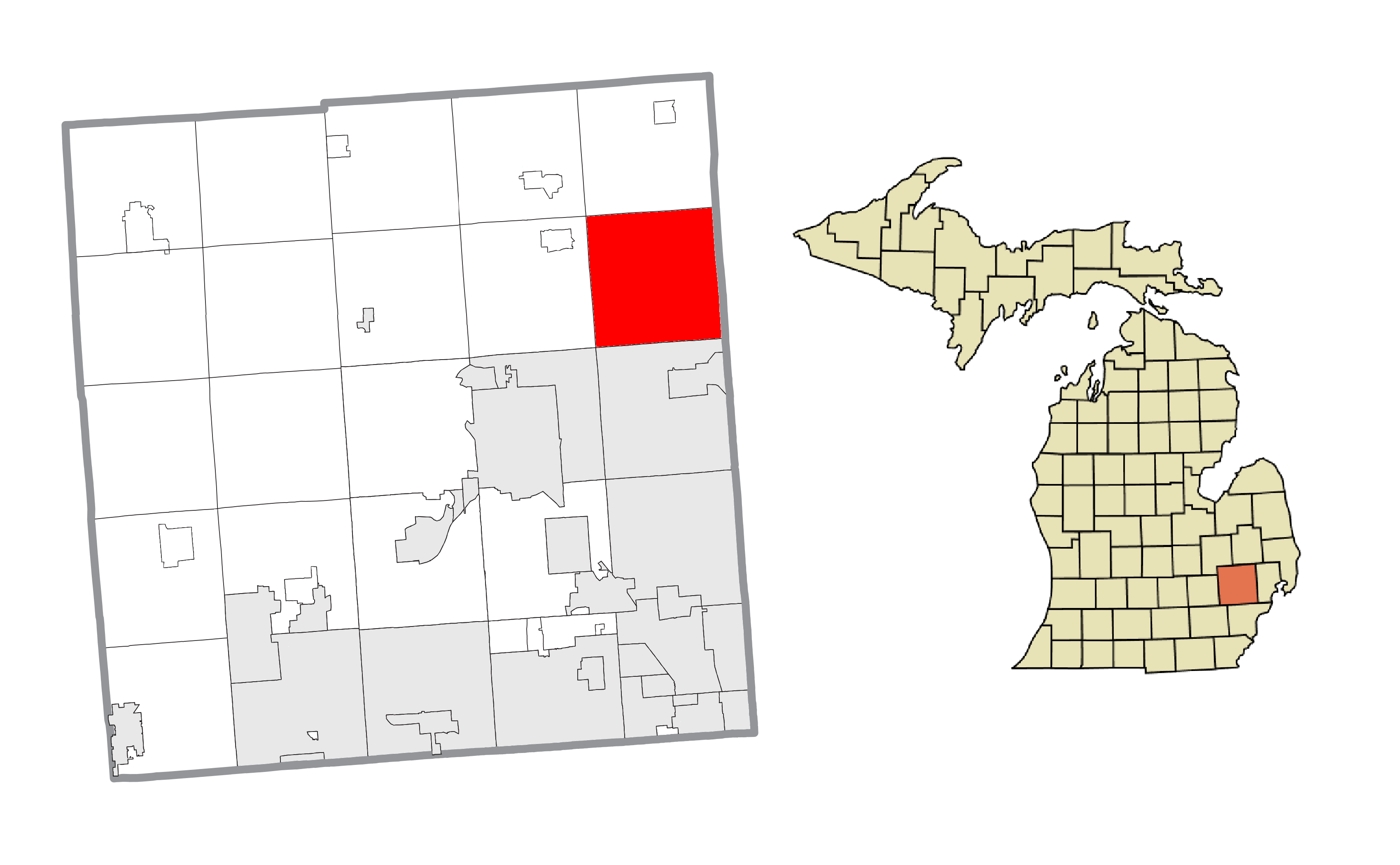
- Location within Oakland County

- Location within the state of Michigan
- Coordinates: 42°44′52″N 83°10′11″W
- Country: United States
- State: Michigan
- County: Oakland
- Settled: 1785
- Established: 1827

Government
  - Manager: Adam Kline

Area
  - Charter township: 36.7 sq mi (95.0 km^{2})
  - Land: 36.3 sq mi (93.9 km^{2})
  - Water: 0.42 sq mi (1.1 km^{2})
- Elevation: 938 ft (286 m)

Population (2020)
  - Charter township: 20,067
  - Density: 553/sq mi (214/km^{2})
  - Metro: 4,296,250 (Metro Detroit)
- Time zone: UTC-5 (Eastern (EST))
  - Summer (DST): UTC-4 (EDT)
- ZIP code(s): 48306, 48363, 48370
- Area codes: 248 and 947
- FIPS code: 26-59820
- GNIS feature ID: 1626833
- Website: Official website

The Charter Township of Oakland is a charter township on the north Oakland County outskirts of Metro Detroit, in the U.S. state of Michigan. It is colloquially referred to as "Oakland Township". The population was 20,067 at the 2020 census.

Oakland Township is less densely populated than neighboring townships to the west, south, and east; and retains many elements of a rural, wooded residential bedroom community. Local ordinances and zoning laws are aimed at limiting commercial and industrial development while maintaining a cap on population density by way of a master plan.

Oakland Township's northern half has its own zip code, "Oakland, Michigan, 48363", while the southern portion of the township shares zip code 48306 with the northernmost portion of adjacent Rochester Hills. "Oakland", "Goodison", “Rochester”, and "Rochester Hills" are other city names recognized for addresses for residents in this township.

== Communities ==
The Township has unincorporated communities:

- Campbells Corner is on the northern border with Addison Township at 42°47′59″N 83°08′01″W.
- Goodison (also historically known as Goodison Station) is located within the township at Collins, Territorial/Orion and Gallagher/Tower Roads (42°43′58″N 83°09′45″W Elevation: 840 ft./256 m.). Goodison is named for William Goodison and his family who ran the local grist mill after immigrating from England. The mill was established in 1835, and a post office began operations in 1874. Goodison was a named station on the Michigan Central Railroad on a north–south track between Bay City and Detroit. One of the Oakland Township Master Plan objectives is to "Establish Goodison as a central gathering place". To this end township officials are attempting to restore water to the water wheel at the current old mill site and draw small retail businesses to the area.

Former Communities:

- Oakland (also known as Kline Settlement and Alert) is located within the township at Stoney Creek and Rochester Roads. This was the original settlement in the township. In its prime it had two churches and a school house. It contained the first post office in the township as well. It is now a Ghost town with only a graveyard left in the area where the town once stood. The town was established in 1822 when the post office was built. In 1894 the town changed names from Oakland to Alert and in 1902 the Alert post office closed its doors. The Paint Creek Methodist Church was moved from this town to Goodison sometime in the 1870s. This is the last remaining building of the town. With the construction on the Michigan Central Railway which established Goodison Station, the town of Oakland was bypassed and this led to its ultimate fate.

== History ==
Oakland Township has the distinction of being one of the Michigan's oldest townships, and was first named in surveys using the guidelines set by the Land Ordinance of 1785. A United States General Land Office opened in 1818, bringing the first permanent settlers to the area. It was one of the original 25 townships in the Territory of Michigan when counties were further divided into townships in 1827. Township boundaries and area (36 sq mi) were finalized in 1837 when Michigan gained statehood.

A grist mill and mill race was built on Paint Creek in 1835. Later named Goodison Mill, it operated for more than 100 years before being dismantled in the late 1940s. The former site of the mill is the current location of Paint Creek Cider Mill.

Goodison Station was a flag station built in 1872 on the Detroit and Bay City Railroad. Another branch of track served the Detroit United Railway. In 1926, a head-on collision between a passenger train and freight train near the Goodison depot resulted in one death and 36 injuries. Passenger service on the lines had ceased by 1950.

Paint Creek Trail opened in 1983 as the first rail trail in Michigan. The trail is in the right-of-way of the former Detroit and Bay City Railroad, Michigan Central Railroad and Penn Central Railroad lines; linking the village of Lake Orion with the city of Rochester and passing through the unincorporated village of Goodison. The original rail line was in service until the track was removed when Penn Central's railroad operations were taken over by Conrail in 1976 The property was purchased by the trail commission representing local governments in 1983 for $450,000.

Oakland Township is one possible location of the final resting place of former Teamsters president Jimmy Hoffa, who has been missing since 1975. A specific piece of property came under scrutiny in January 2013 after Tony Zerilli, 85, the son of reputed former Detroit Partnership boss Joseph Zerilli, told investigators that Hoffa was buried there. It was reported that the property had at one time been owned via land contract and intermediate businesses by Jack Tocco, a convicted mobster who also had legitimate real estate holdings in Metro Detroit, including Oakland Township. On June 17, 2013, FBI investigators arrived to conduct a thorough search of the area. On June 19, 2013, authorities concluded the search after no evidence was discovered.

== Geography ==
Oakland Charter Township is bordered to the north by Addison Township, to the west by Orion Township, to the south by the city of Rochester Hills, and to the east by Washington Township in Macomb County. According to the United States Census Bureau, the township has a total area of 36.7 square miles (95 km^{2}), of which 36.3 square miles (94 km^{2}) is land and 0.4 square miles (1.0 km^{2}), or 1.15%, is water.

== Demographics ==
As of the census of 2000, there were 13,071 people, 4,341 households, and 3,772 families residing in the township. The population density was 358.8 inhabitants per square mile (138.5/km^{2}). There were 4,529 housing units at an average density of 124.3 per square mile (48.0/km^{2}). The racial makeup of the township was 94.14% White, 2.00% African American, 0.09% Native American, 2.62% Asian, 0.19% from other races, and 0.96% from two or more races. Hispanic or Latino of any race were 1.19% of the population.

There were 4,341 households, out of which 45.2% had children under the age of 18 living with them, 80.2% were married couples living together, 4.7% had a female householder with no husband present, and 13.1% were non-families. 11.2% of all households were made up of individuals, and 3.2% had someone living alone who was 65 years of age or older. The average household size was 3.01 and the average family size was 3.26.

In the township the population was spread out, with 30.5% under the age of 18, 5.3% from 18 to 24, 27.9% from 25 to 44, 29.1% from 45 to 64, and 7.1% who were 65 years of age or older. The median age was 38 years. For every 100 females, there were 100.3 males. For every 100 females age 18 and over, there were 97.5 males.

The median income for a household in the township was $102,034, and the median income for a family was $107,268. Males had a median income of $80,354 versus $41,208 for females. The per capita income for the township was $42,616. About 1.7% of families and 2.6% of the population were below the poverty line, including 3.5% of those under age 18 and 1.7% of those age 65 and over.

== Government ==
Oakland Township is a Charter township. While similar to a civil township found elsewhere in the United States, a charter township in Michigan is unique in that it is exempt from annexation by neighboring cities and carries home rule responsibility. The township provides clerk, building, park, and firefighting services. Library service is provided under contract by nearby Rochester Hills Public Library.

The township is primarily governed by:

- Board of Trustees (7 elected members)
- Park Commission (7 elected members)
- Planning Commission (7 appointed members)
- Zoning Board of Appeals (5 appointed members)
- Historical District Commission (7 appointed members)

The board of trustees is responsible for the hire of a Township Manager (similar to a city manager) who manages the day-to-day operations of the local government. Dale Stuart is the township manager. All of these groups have regular meetings that are open to the public and documented with written minutes and videotape available at the township website.

Police protection for the township is provided through a contract with the Oakland County Sheriff's Office, who also provides emergency dispatch services.

Fire protection and emergency medical services is provided by the Oakland Township Fire Department - a "combination" fire department primarily staffed by paid-on-call personnel and one full-time firefighter/paramedic at each fire station. The Oakland Township Fire Department is an advanced life support transporting agency that responds to approximately 900 calls/year, with a majority being medical emergencies.

== Schools ==
Rochester Community Schools serves a majority of the township following a school district consolidation in 1952. Lake Orion Community Schools and Romeo Community Schools serve the remaining areas of the township. Previously, schools within township borders were autonomous. Baldwin School is a former one room schoolhouse in the Goodison area that now serves local students as Baldwin Elementary, a Rochester Community Schools K-5 elementary school.

== Notable people ==
- Luther Elliss, former professional football player, former resident
- Joe Henry, musician
- Ted Lindsay, former professional hockey player
- Eminem, Grammy-winning rapper, songwriter, producer, actor; former resident.
- Joey Sturgis, record producer, currently resides in Oakland Township
- Peter Vanderkaay, Olympic swimmer, grew up in Oakland Township and graduated from Rochester Adams High School in Rochester Hills in 2002; won gold medal at 2004 Summer Olympics in 4x200 free style relay; in 2008 Beijing Olympics, won bronze medal in 200m freestyle and gold in 4 × 200 m freestyle relay

== See also ==
- Rochester, Michigan
- Rochester Hills, Michigan
