= William Edmund Scripps =

American publisher

William E. Scripps in a Curtiss Model F in 1914

William Edmund Scripps (May 6, 1882 – June 12, 1952) was a pioneer aviator and the publisher of The Detroit News. He was also an original founder of the WWJ radio station.

== Biography ==
He was born on May 6, 1882, to James E. Scripps, the founder of Detroit's Evening News. His uncle (father's half-brother) Edward W. Scripps, founded the E.W. Scripps Company; and his aunt (father's half-sister), Ellen Browning Scripps, was a noted philanthropist. He was a great uncle to Samuel H. Scripps. His brother-in-law, George Gough Booth, worked alongside him in the newspaper and radio industry. His nephew (George's son) was James Scripps Booth, an artist and automotive engineer.

Scripps married Nina Amenda Downey and had four children. A one-room schoolhouse on the family property was named for his wife. When his son James Edmund II died of appendicitis in 1925 at 22, an oil painting was donated to the Detroit Art Museum in his memory by his wife in 1954. The painting is "The Nut Gatherers" by William Adolphe Bourguereau.

He died on June 12, 1952, from a respiratory illness.

== Estate ==
In 1916, he began purchasing large tracts of farmland in Lake Orion, Michigan, with an ambition to raise livestock and show animals, including Angus cattle, swine, cows, and poultry. The estate, called Wildwood Farms, grew in size to 3,830 acres (15.5 km^{2}).

In the mid-1920s Scripps hired his brother-in-law, architect Clarence E. Day, to build a new home for his family on the northwest quadrant of the property. Scripps Mansion, a magnificent Norman and Tudor style dwelling, was completed in 1927. It has served as a guest house and retreat center for the Catholic church since the 1950s and is not open to the public, except on scheduled guided tours showcasing the interior design and garden.

Many of the European paintings from the estate were later donated to the Detroit Institute of Arts. William was an active contributor to the DIA, and his father James was an original founder of the permanent collection building.

After his death in 1952, the farm livestock and equipment was auctioned off, and the land was sold or donated for parkland to Orion Township, Oakland County, and the state of Michigan (Bald Mountain Recreation Area). The farm buildings and employee housing were later developed in the Canterbury Village shopping center.

In 2007 the estate was added to the National Register of Historic Places.

== Aviation and boating ==
Scripps was an avid aviator and promoted aviation through his father's newspaper, The Detroit News, which he helped run from 1929–1952. In 1913, Scripps flew a Curtis Model F flying boat underneath the original Belle Isle Bridge.

Scripps invited Amelia Earhart to Lake Orion in 1929, where she successfully tested an experimental glider.

In 1904, Scripps helped found the Gold Cup boat racing series on the Detroit River.

== Media ==
William had a role with the News after his father's death, although the paper was primarily run by George Gough Booth; William's brother in law.

William and his brother John Scripps were original founders of WWJ (AM) radio in 1920. Worried that radio might interfere with newspaper sales, the Scripps family invested in the new medium. Housed in The Detroit News Building, it began limited broadcasts that same year. During the 1940s, William established the first radio broadcasting of Alcoholics Anonymous. The station remained under News ownership until 1987, when U.S. Federal Communications Commission (FCC) regulations mandated a sale to prevent cross ownership. WWJ is currently broadcasting as a popular all-news format.

In 1947 the News also founded a television station, WWJ TV. That station remains on the air, however it is now known as WDIV-TV. A new and separate station known as WWJ-TV began operations in 1978.
