= Bald Mountain Recreation Area =

Recreation area in Oakland County, Michigan, US

Bald Mountain State Recreation Area
- Location within Michigan Location within the United States
- Location: Oakland County, Michigan, United States
- Nearest city: Lake Orion, Michigan
- Coordinates: 42°46′38″N 83°12′41″W
- Area: 4,637 acres (18.77 km^{2})
- Governing body: Michigan Department of Natural Resources
- Website: Official website
- Lower Trout Lake Bathhouse Complex and Contact Station
- U.S. National Register of Historic Places
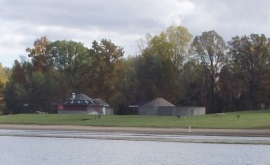
- Interactive map
- Built: 1964
- Architect: Gunnar Birkerts
- Architectural style: Modern
- NRHP reference No.: 13000670
- Added to NRHP: September 3, 2013

Bald Mountain State Recreation Area is a 4,637-acre (1,877 ha) state park located near Lake Orion, Michigan off M-24. It consists of some of the most rugged terrain in southeastern Michigan. The recreation area is composed of a North Unit and a South Unit, which are not contiguous. The South Unit itself includes two parts separated by M-24 (Lapeer Road), but the section west of M-24 has no recreational facilities or trails and is primarily undeveloped forest and grassy plains segmented by a few through-roads.

It is a popular recreation area for day users, hunters, and fishermen. Hunting opportunities encompass deer, rabbit, squirrel, Canada goose, woodchuck, duck, raccoon, and woodcock. Fishing options include bass, pike, panfish, and trout. Additionally, the park features a rifle and a sporting clays range.

Bald Mountain gained widespread attention when it was the location of two assisted suicides performed by Dr. Jack Kevorkian in 1991.

Bald Mountain's South Unit is adjacent to the grounds of Lake Orion High School.

Some of the land that is now part of Bald Mountain had previously been a part of the Scripps Mansion.

== Facilities ==
The Bald Mountain State Recreation Area was also home to the only recreational facilities designed by world-renowned architect Gunnar Birkerts. Known by the name Lower Trout Lake Bathhouse Complex and Contact Station, as the buildings are listed on the National Register of Historic Places, the complex included five Mid-Century Modern resources, located on two separate land parcels in the Trout Creek section of the Bald Mountain State Recreation Area. Four of the buildings—the men's and women's bathhouses, a pump house, and a concessions stand—were all set on a large circular pad of concrete pavement near the beach at Lower Trout Lake. The fifth building—a "contact station"—is located about a mile away at the entrance to the Trout Creek section. The buildings were all circular in form and constructed of patterned, cast-in-place, reinforced concrete. They ranged in size from 225 square feet to 1200 square feet.

The five structures were commissioned by the Michigan Department of Conservation, during the Mission 66 era. A master plan for the park had been approved in 1955, but it was not until 1964 that the state approached Birkerts to design the facilities. In keeping with Mission 66 design guidelines, Birkerts designed the structures to require little maintenance, and with unusually shaped roofs and textured concrete walls. Construction on the buildings began in 1964 and was completed in 1969. These facilities were listed on the National Register of Historic Places in 2013. All but the main boathouse and the small contact house were demolished in September 2024.

== Activities ==
- Hunting: The park is open to hunting from September 15 to March 31.
- Shooting/Archery range
- Swimming: The South Unit's Lower Trout Lake features a sandy beach.
- Canoeing
- Playground
- Hiking: There are 15 miles of marked trails, some rugged.
- Mountain biking
- Cross-country skiing: Eight miles of trails are groomed.
- Snowmobiling: The park's southern trails (seven miles' worth) are open to snowmobiling.
- Boating
- Fishing: Trout Creek and Paint Creek are designated trout streams. Graham Lake and other area lakes have largemouth bass and northern pike.
- Picnicking
  - Picnic area
  - Picnic shelter
- Camping: Camping options are limited to two rustic cabins in the North Unit.
- Metal Detecting: Metal detecting is permitted in designated areas of the park. Found items are subject to review by park staff and may be retained pending further investigation.

== See also ==
- National Register of Historic Places listings in Oakland County, Michigan
