= James Marcinkowski =

Former CIA officer

James Marcinkowski (born January 10, 1955) is a former Central Intelligence Agency (CIA) case officer and former administrative staff attorney in the Oakland County Prosecutor's Office (Michigan), and was an unsuccessful candidate in the 2006 election for the United States House of Representatives in Michigan's 8th Congressional District. He is one of the former CIA officers who has spoken about the consequences of the Plame affair.

== Early life ==
Marcinkowski was born in Hamtramck, Michigan of Polish descent. After finishing high school in 1973, Marcinkowski, then 18, clerked in the Computer Systems Division of the Federal Bureau of Investigation. In 1975, he enlisted in the United States Navy, where, as an Operations Specialist he became an expert in anti-submarine warfare, was an Air Controller, and collected shipboard intelligence on the Soviet Navy during the Cold War. He served aboard the USS Rathburne FF-1057 and was a member of the commissioning crew of the USS John Rodgers DD-983.

Following assignments to the 3rd and 7th (Pacific) and the 2nd (Atlantic) Fleets, Marcinkowski returned to Michigan where he earned his B.A. degree in political science from Michigan State University in 1982. At Michigan State, Marcinkowski ran Ronald Reagan's campus campaign in 1980 and served as the Michigan College Republican chairman in 1980–82. In 1985 he earned a Juris Doctor degree from the University of Detroit School of Law.

== Career ==
After graduating from law school, Marcinkowski joined the CIA. He completed the Career Trainee Program and the Operations Course to become a case officer in the Agency's Directorate of Operations. He served as an Operations Officer in Washington, D.C. and Central America.

After leaving the CIA in 1989, Marcinkowski joined the Prosecutor's Office in Oakland County, Michigan where, as an executive staff attorney, he established the first special prosecution unit for domestic violence. In 1993, Marcinkowski abruptly left the office, refusing to cooperate with the criminal probe of another assistant prosecutor who was arrested in a gambling raid.

He publicly accused his former boss, Prosecutor Richard Thompson, of corruption and demanded an investigation by Michigan Attorney General Frank Kelly. After a review of the allegations, Kelly, a Democrat, declined the request citing a lack of "specific information" that Thompson, a Republican, broke any laws.

That same year, Marcinkowski filed a lawsuit against Thompson claiming defamation and violation of his First Amendment rights. The case resulted in a judgment for Defamation against Richard Thompson and other Oakland County officials. Later, as a Deputy City Attorney for the City of Royal Oak, Marcinkowski obtained the first criminal conviction of Jack Kevorkian. He is a member of Teamsters Local 214.

A former resident of Oxford, Michigan, he unsuccessfully ran as a Republican candidate for state representative in 1992 and township trustee in August 2000. A former member of the Young Republicans, he made a $250 campaign contribution to George W. Bush in 1999. He made a total of $350 in contributions to Republican Michael Cox's successful 2002 run for Michigan Attorney General.

Marcinkowski, a resident of Lake Orion, Michigan, was the Democratic nominee for U.S. Representative from Michigan's 8th Congressional District in 2006 (see map). He was defeated by Republican incumbent Mike Rogers of Brighton. Marcinkowski currently is acting vice president of the Atwater Commons HOA (Homeowner's Association) in Lake Orion.

== Plame affair ==
Marcinkowski trained with Valerie Plame when he started at the CIA in September 1985. On July 22, 2005, Marcinkowski joined two other former CIA agents, Vincent Cannistraro and Larry Johnson, in discussing the consequences of the Plame affair.

== Congressional campaign ==
On June 28, 2006, an article in Congressional Quarterly's CQPolitics.com announced that Marcinkowski's early campaign efforts had spurred it to change its rating of the race to "Republican Favored" from "Safe Republican". The article noted that Marcinkowski presented two logistical challenges that Republican Mike Rogers had not faced in either of his previous re-election bids: location and resources. Marcinkowski hailed from the portion of Oakland County outside of Detroit at the eastern end of the 8th District. According to Congressional Quarterly, that gave Rogers, from Livingston County in the middle of the 8th, his first direct competition for votes in the portion annexed to the district in the most recent remap.

Campaign resources were also giving Marcinkowski an advantage over past candidates; he had enough money to launch a radio ad campaign in early June, putting him ahead of Rogers' past two underfinanced opponents. A May 4, 2006 article in Roll Call noted that Marcinkowski raised more than $138,000 from January 1-March 31, 2006 — about $11,000 more than Rogers took in during that same period. Marcinkowski received 79 percent of his money from individual contributions, which, according to his comments in the article, translated into support on the ground in the district.

According to Roll Call, Rogers received 63 percent of his first-quarter money from political action committees, while only 37 percent came from individual contributions. Marcinkowski told Roll Call, "It is way harder to raise money from working people than from the K Street Project. I think it shows that we're connecting to people in the district."

== Founding member of the Veteran Intelligence Professionals for Sanity ==
Marcinkowski is a founding member of the Veteran Intelligence Professionals for Sanity.

In September 2015, Marcinkowski and 27 other members of VIPS steering group wrote a letter to President Obama, challenging a recently published book, that claimed to rebut the report of the United States Senate Intelligence Committee on the Central Intelligence Agency's use of torture.

== See also ==
Fighting Dems
