= Bi-Autogo =

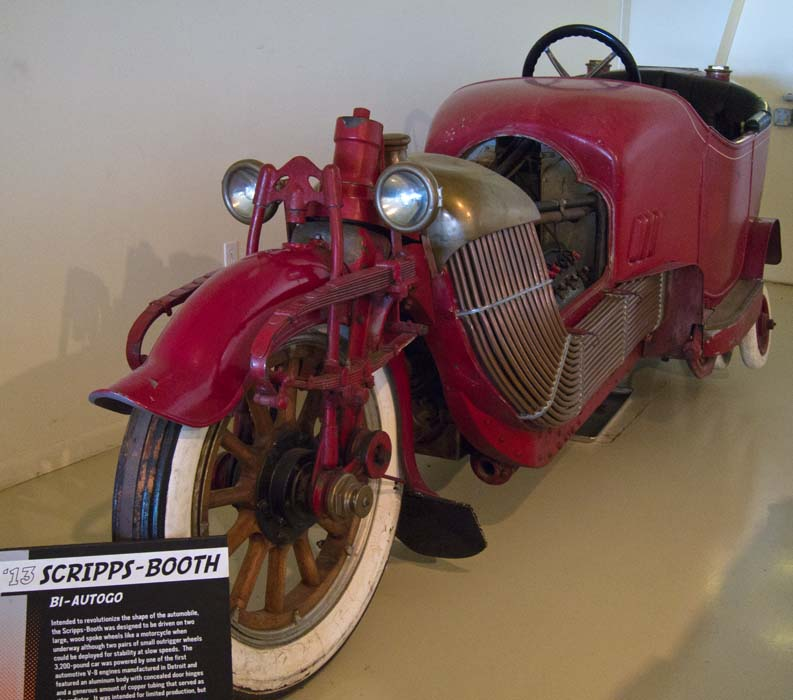
- Bi-Autogo (engine cover removed for display purposes).

Overview
- Manufacturer: Scripps Automobile Company
- Production: 1908-1912
- Designer: James Scripps Booth

Body and chassis
- Body style: roadster

Powertrain
- Engine: 6.3 L V8
- Transmission: 4-speed manual

Dimensions
- Curb weight: 3,200 lb (1,500 kg)

The Bi-Autogo was a prototype American cyclecar, built from 1908 to 1912.

Designed and built by Detroit artist & engineer James Scripps Booth, it had the usual two wheels (wooden-spoked, 37 inches (940 mm)), plus two pairs of smaller, retractable outrigger wheels in the three-seater body. Fitted with wheel steering, it had a 45 hp (33.5 kW) V8 engine (3.5 in × 5 in (89 mm × 127 mm), 384.8 cu in (6,306 cm^{3})), the first of its kind from a Detroit company, with an external copper tube radiator, and a weight of 3,200 pounds (1,500 kg). Just one was built. It is in the collection of the Detroit Historical Society. The Bi-Autogo was restored in 2017 by Mobsteel in Detroit.

== See also ==
- Gyrocar
- Cyclecar
- List of motorcycles of the 1910s
- List of motorcycles by type of engine
