= MacArthur Bridge (Detroit) =

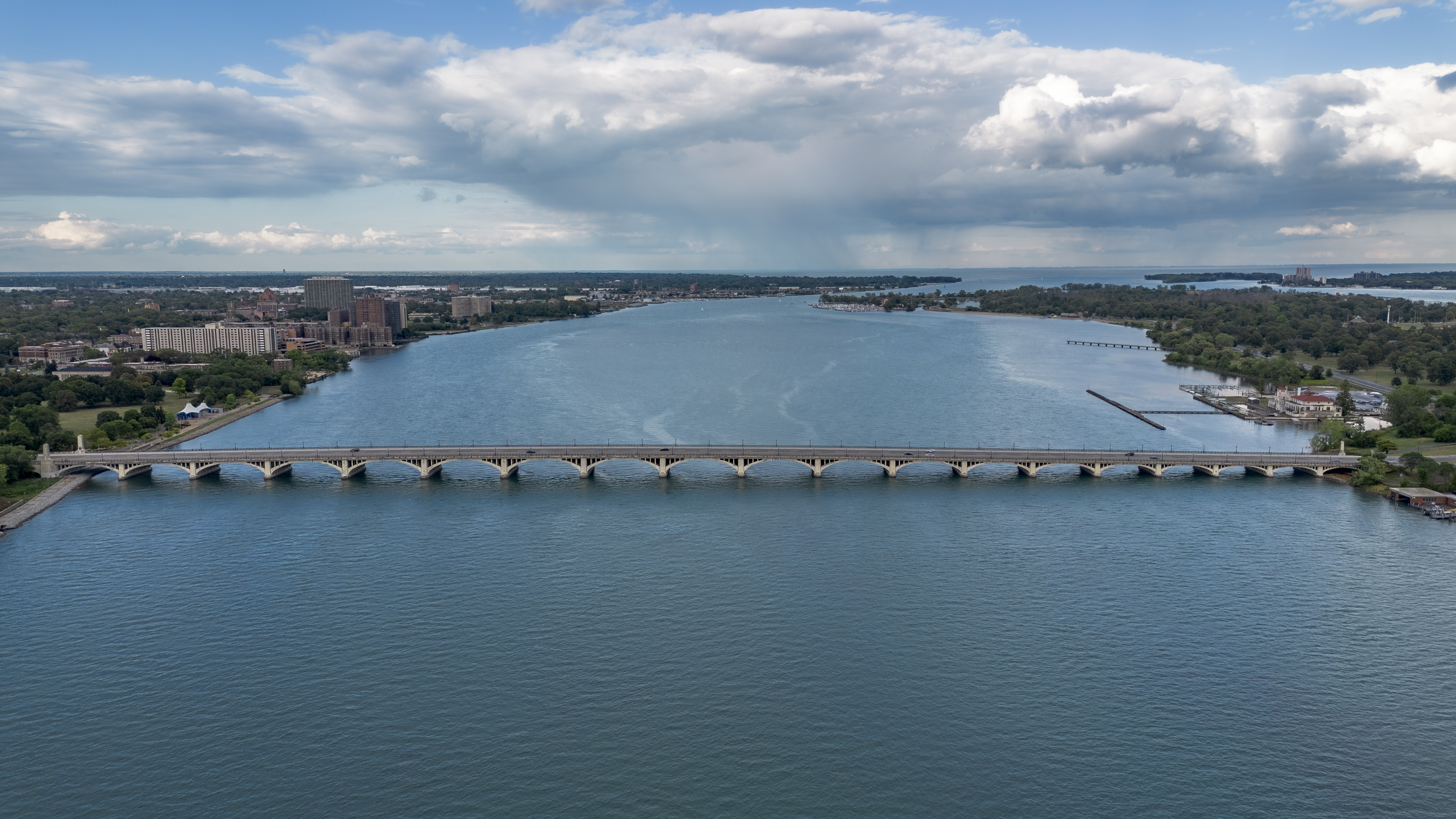
- MacArthur Bridge in 2025
- Coordinates: 42°20′33″N 82°59′55″W
- Carries: 5 lanes of East Grand Boulevard
- Crosses: Detroit River
- Locale: Detroit, Michigan
- Official name: Douglas MacArthur Bridge
- Other name: Belle Isle Bridge

Characteristics
- Design: Arch bridge
- Total length: 2,193 feet (668 m)
- Width: 85 feet (26 m)
- Clearance below: 30 feet (9 m)

History
- Opened: November 1, 1923

Location
- Interactive map of MacArthur Bridge

The MacArthur Bridge spans a channel of the Detroit River in Detroit, Michigan. The bridge, which features 19 total arches across 2,193 feet (668 m), provides main access between the city's mainland and Belle Isle. Completed in 1923 for $2.635 million (equivalent to $37.7 million in 2024), it replaced an iron bridge with wooden decking that accidentally caught fire and was destroyed in 1915. The bridge, popularly known as the Belle Isle Bridge, was originally named the George Washington Bridge and renamed the Douglas MacArthur Bridge after General Douglas MacArthur in 1942. It was restored in 1986 at a cost of $11.5 million (equivalent to $27.8 million in 2024).

In 1913, William Edmund Scripps (of the Scripps publishing family), flew a Curtiss Aeroplane and Motor Company flying boat underneath the original Belle Isle Bridge.

Two sets of streetcar tracks were built into the east side of the bridge but a streetcar route was never implemented. The tracks were eventually paved over in the 1950s.

== Photo gallery ==
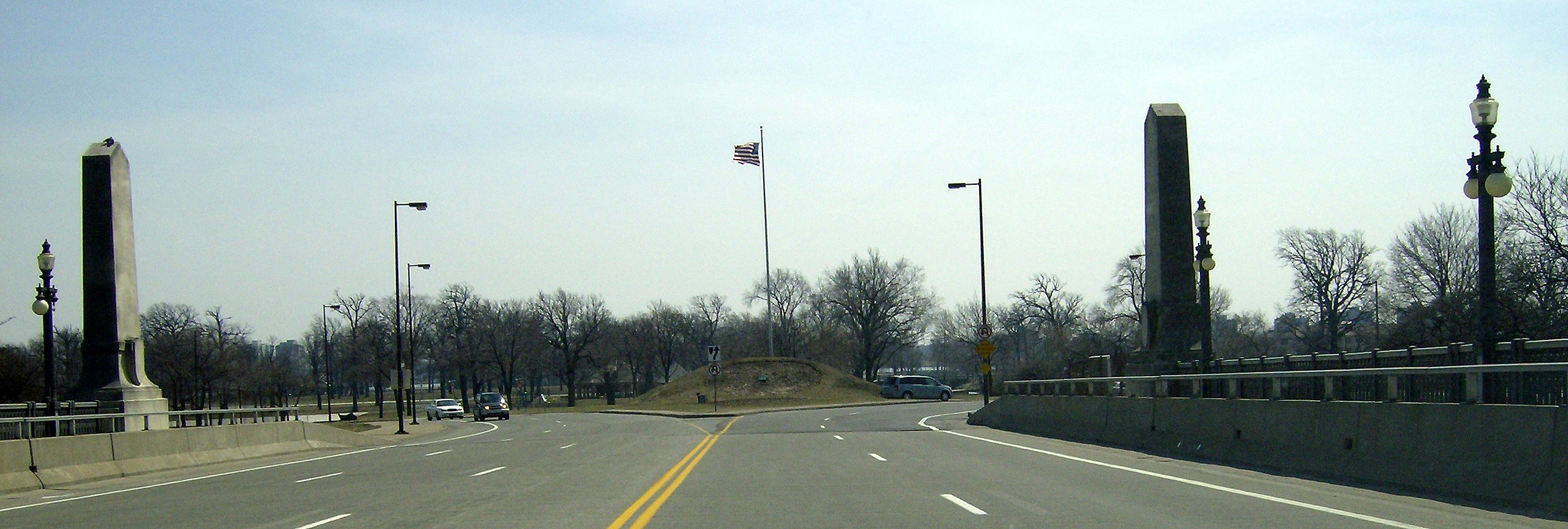
Entering Belle Isle from MacArthur Bridge

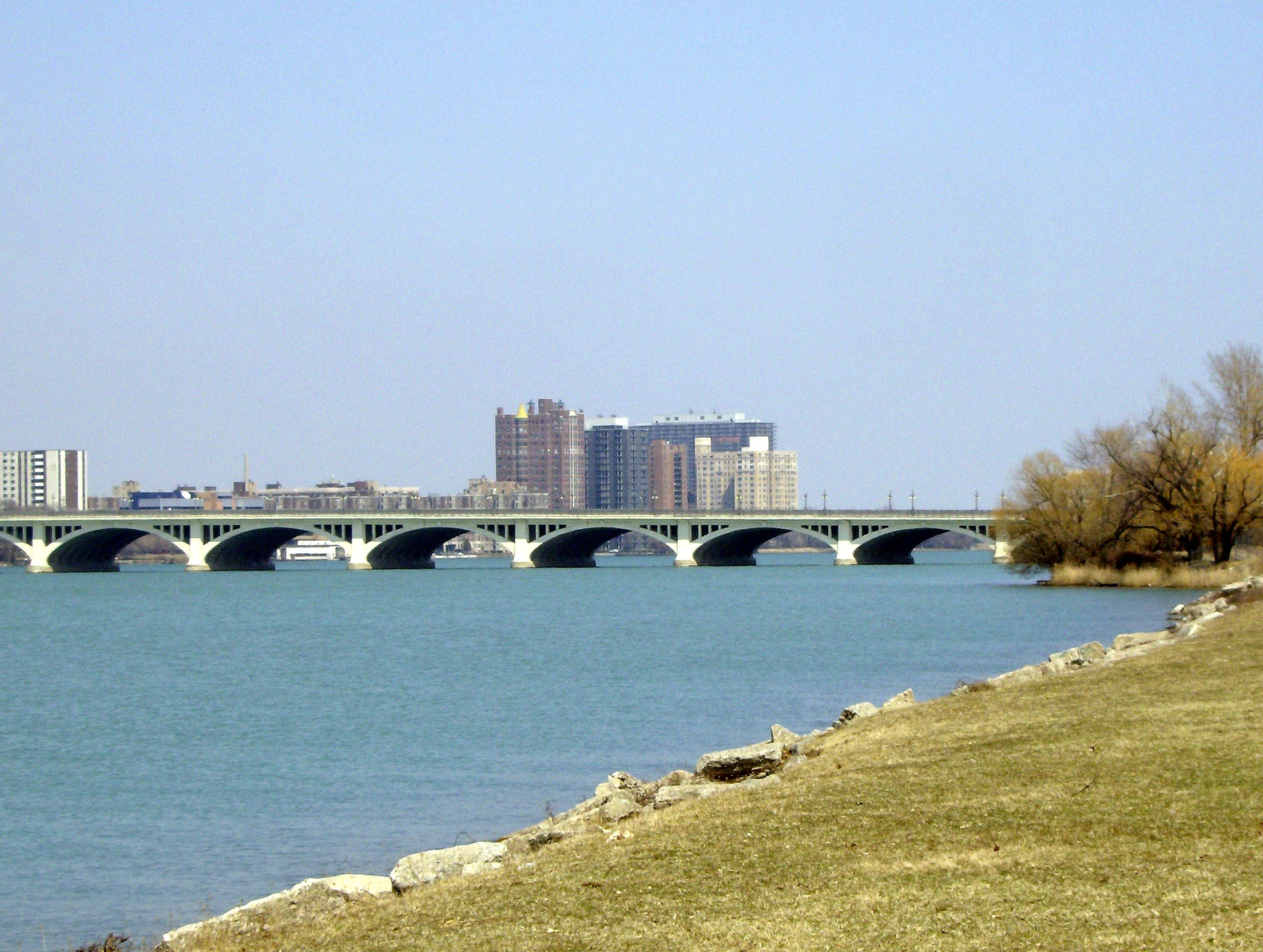
View of bridge from Belle Isle

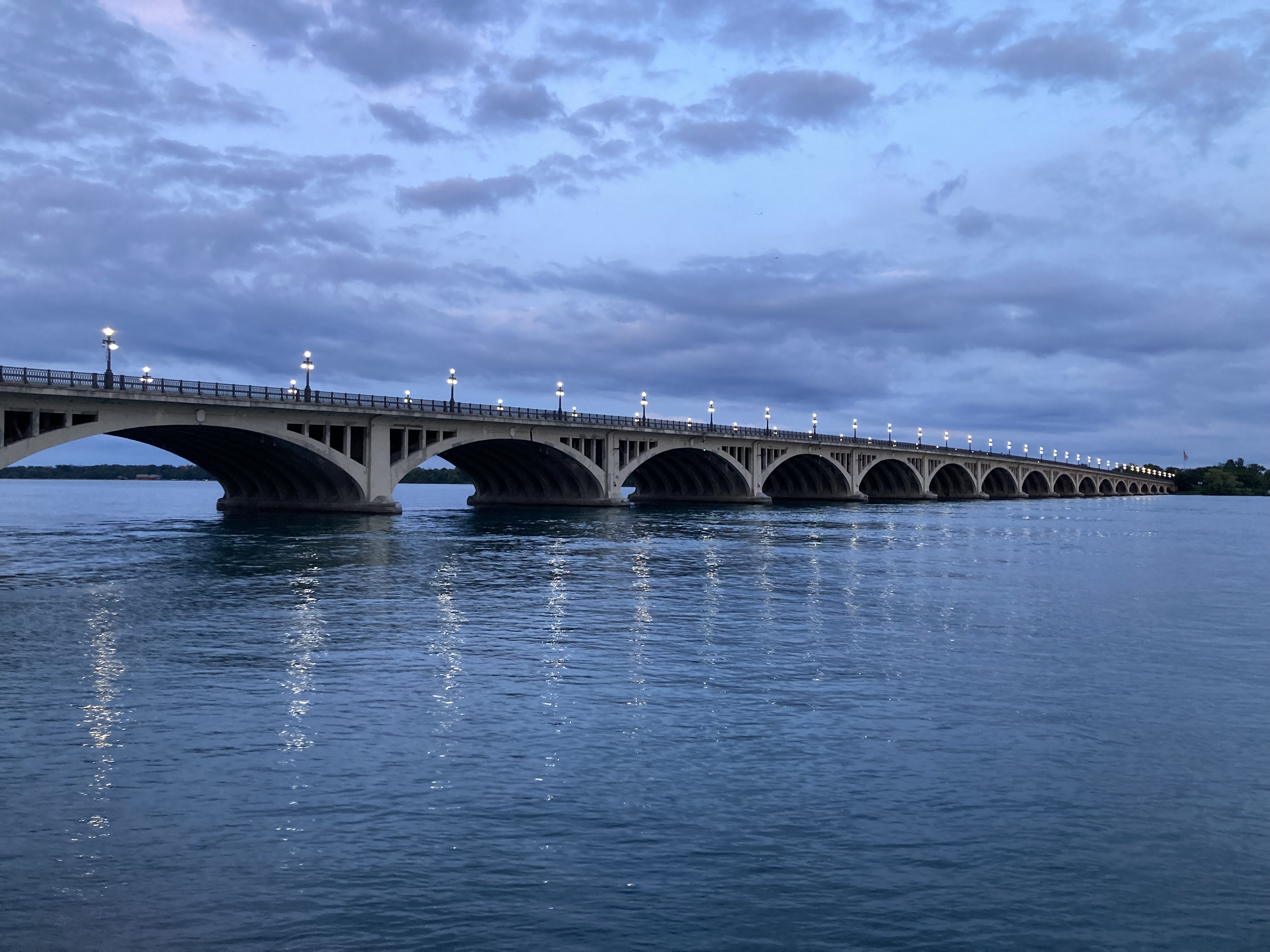
View of bridge from the Detroit International Riverfront
