= Transcript =

Transcript may refer to:

- Transcript (biology), a molecule of RNA transcribed from DNA
- Transcript (education), a copy of a student's permanent academic record
- Transcript (law), a written record of spoken language in court proceedings
- Transcript (programming language), a computer programming language
- "Transcript" (Space Ghost Coast to Coast), an episode of Space Ghost Coast to Coast
- Transcripts of legislative bodies
- The Transcript, Ohio Wesleyan University's student-run newspaper

== See also ==
- Script (disambiguation)
- Transcription (disambiguation)
