= James Scripps Booth =

American artist & engineer (1888–1954)

James Scripps Booth (May 31, 1888 – September 13, 1954) was an artist and automotive engineer.

== Biography ==
The eldest of George Gough Booth and Ellen Booth's five children, James was born on May 31, 1888, in Detroit, Michigan. He received his education at private schools, he left school before graduating from the tenth grade. By this time, his artistic gifts were well recognized.

At 22, Booth married Jean Alice McLaughlin in 1910 in Detroit. The young couple traveled abroad and lived for a period in Paris, where Booth studied at the École des Beaux-Arts. They also spent time in Etaples, France with Michigan-born artist Myron Barlow, who taught Booth the fundamentals of working with pastels. Booth quickly took to the medium and thereafter preferred it to all others.

He accepted and completed two important commissions in 1917. One commission, from the directors of the Evening News Association, called for him to render a series of pastel drawings of the soon-to-be-vacated Detroit lebron News Shelby Street plant. The second commission came from his father, who wished to have a set of Cranbrook scenes for his own home. Following the completion of these works, Booth moved to Pasadena, California, with his wife and children. First in his El Molino, CA home and later in a home he designed for himself in Linda Vista, Booth built studios where he executed an extensive body of work, primarily pastel drawings of nudes and clothed models set in the surrounding hills. Many of these were exhibited at the Detroit Museum of Art and the Scarab Club, where they were well received.

In the 1930s, Booth established a studio and automotive workshop in Indian Village in Detroit. Here, he spent considerable time reworking and brightening his earlier pastels and producing works far more colorful than those he had executed previously. During this period of his life, he maintained an active interest in the work his parents were carrying on at Cranbrook.

Prior to the death of his wife Jean in July, 1942, Booth discontinued teaching his automotive courses. Booth remarried on February 20, 1943, to Ellen Catherine Norlen. Wishing to remain near his parents, the couple took up residence in Grosse Pointe. There, after the death of George Booth in 1949, James began to edit Cyril Player's biography of his father (published in 1964 as The Only Thing Worth Finding).

In 1951, the Booths left Detroit for New Canaan, Connecticut, where they purchased and restored a historic home, "Sun House". Booth converted the barn of the house into a studio and continued to paint, work on his automobiles, and write. There he completed a commentary on the Bible, Adventures in Analysis, which he published in 1954 under the pseudonym "Edmund Wood Gagnier".

He died suddenly in Connecticut at age 66 on September 13, 1954, and was buried in the family plot in Greenwood Cemetery in Birmingham, Michigan.

== Legacy ==
At the time of his death, Booth left behind many hundreds of paintings, pastels, scrapbooks, and sketches for new automobile designs. A large collection of his engineering drawings and several of his cars, including the "Bi-Autogo" and the "JB Rocket," were donated to the Detroit Historical Museum by his widow. The "Da Vinci" is owned by the Northwood University in Midland, and the Henry Ford Museum in Dearborn holds a few Booth cyclecars and Scripps-Booth models. His art work is in the permanent collections of Cranbrook Academy of Art Museum, the Detroit Institute of Arts, the Detroit Historical Museum, and Cranbrook Educational Community.

== Art work ==
Growing up in a household that encouraged an awareness and appreciation of the arts, James Scripps Booth spent many hours sketching in and around his parents' home in Detroit. There he had access to one of the largest private collections of old master paintings and etchings in the Midwest, and it was in the Scripps home that he was brought into the company of many distinguished artists, writers, and musicians.

While attending the Detroit University School and the St. Luke's School for Boys in Wayne, Pennsylvania, Booth executed posters, handbills, sketches, and set designs for student publications and productions. He also produced several racing scenes and other works featuring automobiles during this period, giving notice that automotive themes were never far from his mind.

Booth was essentially self-taught as an artist, although he did attend the École des Beaux-Arts in Paris in 1911 and studied for a period under Myron Barlow, the Michigan-born artist, in France. His work received critical acclaim at exhibitions at the Detroit Museum of Art and at other shows in Michigan and California in the 1910s through the 1930s. However, Booth's reluctance to part with his art work greatly limited his appeal to collectors. Only a handful of his paintings and pastels ever came to be owned outside the Booth family.

Best known for his pastel work, Booth also produced a large number of oils, charcoal drawings, pen and ink sketches, watercolors, and pencil drawings. None of the few sculptures he executed are known to exist.

== Automotive designer and engineer ==
From his early teen years until the time of his death at the age of 66, James Scripps Booth maintained a passionate interest in mechanical engineering and automotive design. He was a serious student of the automobile, closely followed trends and emerging technology in the industry, and was responsible for inventing many automotive features which became standard in time.

Booth acquired his knowledge of mechanics just after the turn of the century in his parents' garage, where he carefully dismantled and reassembled family automobiles to learn as much as he could about their operation. Much of this knowledge was quickly put into practice, for as the family chauffeur, he was called upon frequently to make repairs on the road.

As is evidenced from the marginalia of his schoolbooks, James Booth developed a precocious flair for automotive design at an early age. By his twentieth fourth birthday, he had engineered and built his first car, the Bi-Autogo. It was designed to travel on two large wheels at speeds above 20 mph; at lower speeds a pair of smaller wheels could be lowered to balance the machine. Booth intended the car to be a limited production vehicle that would appeal to wealthy young men with a sporting character. Because of the tremendous engineering challenges that his design presented, however, Booth was obliged to delay construction of the prototype. In May 1913, he finally produced a vehicle that incorporated many innovative features: it had the first V-8 engine ever built in Detroit, possessed a compressed air self-starter, had a four-speed transmission, and even boasted a retractable arm rest. The engine cowling and body panels were built of aluminum, and the top speed of the car, Booth stated, was 75 mph (120 km/h). Nonetheless, lacking a power steering unit, the "Bi-Autogo" was extremely hard to turn at low speeds. After the prototype was fashioned and a complete set of parts were fabricated, funding for the vehicle ceased. Consequently, the "Bi-Autogo" never came to market.

With John Batterman, a distant relation, Booth organized the Scripps-Booth Cyclecar Company in Detroit. In 1913, they began to manufacture the "JB Rocket", a small roadster, and a delivery model, the "Packet". Despite the brisk sales of his cars, Booth realized the cyclecar fad had run its course and sold the company in 1914. Enlisting backers, he immediately began another venture, the Scripps-Booth Company. This firm was organized to market his designs for a "luxurious light car . . . designed to meet the ideal of drivers of big, expensive family cars who want a light car of equal luxury and equipment." The first car to roll off the company's assembly lines, the Model C, was the first car sold with a spare wheel and tire and a steering wheel horn button. Later models featured such amenities as electric door locking systems and removable hard tops. The beautiful, clean lines and fine appointments of Scripps-Booth automobiles did, as Booth predicted, appeal to the tastes of wealthy clients. Among those who purchased Scripps-Booth cars were the King of Spain, the Queen of the Netherlands, Winston Churchill, and the tenor John McCormick.

Over Booth's objections that a move from light car production would weaken the market share of the Scripps-Booth Company, company directors began to approve the additions of larger and larger models to its product lines. Angered by this turn of events, Booth tendered his resignation to the company in the autumn of 1916, just as Scripps-Booth began to experience a severe drop in sales. At the end of 1917, the company was absorbed by Chevrolet and in the following year, when Chevrolet was acquired by General Motors, Scripps-Booth became a part of the General Motors family. The line was discontinued altogether in 1922.

In 1923, Booth began to design his ultimate driving machine, the "Da Vinci". This compact car featured an underslung worm drive axle which allowed for a flat nineteen inch floor (much lower than any other car on the market), cable-controlled hood latches, hanging brake and clutch pedals, and a parking brake in the transmission. Having no interest in manufacturing the car on his own, Booth attempted to sell his novel design to established automakers. He was understandably horrified, then, when Stutz produced a car with a similar underslung drive a year after he had shown the firm the "Da Vinci" plans. A costly patent infringement suit ensued, which Booth eventually won in 1935. By then, however, Stutz was ailing financially and the judgement that Booth received barely covered his own legal expenses. After this disconcerting ordeal, Booth produced just one other vehicle—the "Da Vinci Pup", a small, sleek cyclecar—and that solely for his own pleasure.

At the outbreak of the Second World War, Booth realized that women were going to need to know more about the operation of their cars. Consequently, he began to conduct Red Cross classes on automobile mechanics at his Detroit studio. In addition, he wrote and published General Handbook, Motor Mechanics Simplified: Understand Your Car as a text for the course.

Through his association with the Scripps-Booth Company and as an independent designer, Booth championed the cause of the small car in America from the mid-1910s through the mid-1920s. In this respect, automotive historians consider him to be decades ahead of his time. Once retired from active participation in the business, he continued to design cars for his own pleasure and kept a small collection of automobiles, including several of his own design, which he maintained in excellent running condition. Several of these are now owned by the Detroit Historical Museum, Henry Ford Museum, and Northwood University in Midland, Michigan.

== Sources ==
- Coir, Mark; James Scripps Booth: Artist and Engineer. Cranbrook Archives. 1988.
- Personal papers belonging to James Scripps Booth and John McLaughlin Booth. Cranbrook Archives, Bloomfield Hills, Michigan.
- James Scripps Booth: Artist, Engineer, Polymath. Foreword by Jason Weems; University of Michigan Press, 2008.
