= Scripps Mansion =

- William Edmund and Nina A. Downey Scripps Estate
- U.S. National Register of Historic Places
- U.S. Historic district
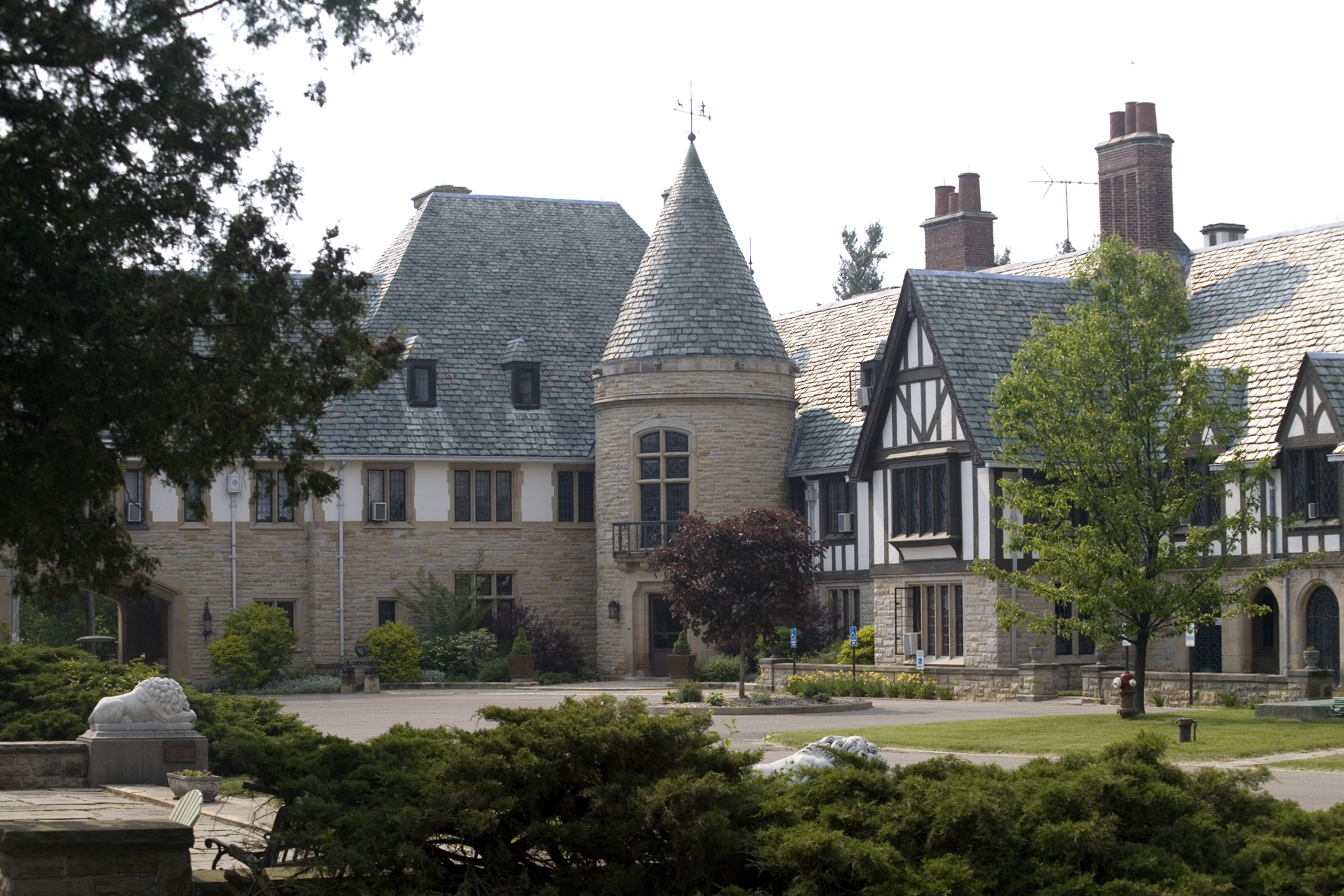
- The mansion in 2008

- Location within Michigan
- Interactive map
- Location: 1840 W. Scripps Rd; Lake Orion, Michigan
- Coordinates: 42°44′58″N 83°17′01″W
- Built: 1927
- Architect: Clarence E. Day
- Architectural style: Norman/Tudor Revival
- NRHP reference No.: 07001009
- Added to NRHP: September 27, 2007

The Scripps Mansion (originally called Moulton Manor) is a Norman/Tudor Revival style mansion located in Orion Township, Michigan, United States. The buildings and surrounding land are known collectively as the William E. Scripps Estate.

Since 1956, the property has been part of the campus of Guest House, a residential treatment center for Catholic clergy. The estate was added to the National Register of Historic Places in 2007.

== History ==
The mansion was built in 1927 for William Edmund Scripps and his family as a summer residence, at an estimated cost of $2.5 million. Scripps, the founder of the WWJ radio station (and son of the founder of the Detroit News), was an aviator, radio pioneer, inventor, and environmentalist. It is currently not open to the public due to ongoing repairs, but tours and events have been offered in the past to showcase the interior design and garden.

The mansion was designed by Detroit architect Clarence E. Day, who was also Scripps brother-in-law. Its exterior and interior reflect a combination of Norman Revival and English Tudor influences. The towers, large massing, and steep hipped roof were inspired by the architecture of Normandy, France.

The estate's landscape was designed by pioneering American landscape architect Bryant Fleming. His design for the Scripps estate created both sweeping long views and intimate short views, offering visual interest and beauty throughout the grounds. The landscape features include gardens, garden rooms and water features that consist of formal fountains, reflecting pools, and naturalistic waterfalls.

The gardens also featured iron gates expertly crafted by Samuel Yellin, a master blacksmith and metal designer. Oscar Bach, also a noted blacksmith and metal designer, designed and crafted the main entrance gates to the mansion, along with decorative metalwork inside the home. Additional interior features included Pewabic Pottery, stained glass by the Detroit-Stained Glass Works, and furnishings from the Hayden Company.

The 28,000-square-foot mansion contains 67 rooms, including 15 bedrooms and 11 fireplaces. The steel-framed building features an exterior of gold and buff Briar Hill sandstone ashlar at the ground level, with half-timbering and stucco on the second story.

The mansion is distinguished by three round towers, a prominent rustic slate roof with gable and hip forms, varied dormers and chimneys, single and grouped windows, and a large open porte cochere. Throughout the interior, many original features remain, including marble, carved stone and woodwork, decorative metalwork, custom details, stained glass, ornamental plaster, painted finishes, and furnishings.

The farmland of 3,830 acres (15.5 km^{2}) was purchased by Scripps in 1916 from several different landowners. At its peak, the farm featured Angus cattle, cows, swine, sheep, and poultry. During the Depression years, the farmhands and mansion servants all lived on the property. A small one-room schoolhouse for children of farm employees was established in 1925, and in 1952, it was converted into an Episcopalian church.

Amelia Earhart, at the request of Scripps, flew an experimental glider at the property in 1929. Scripps, a pilot himself, became a glider enthusiast and formed his own company (Gliders, Inc.) in 1929. He began his venture by manufacturing a primary type glider.

== Today ==
Scripps died in 1952, Nina Scripps sold the estate to a group of investors shortly thereafter. A large part of the collection of European paintings from the estate was donated to the Detroit Institute of Arts in 1956. Austin Ripley, Guest House founder, purchased a portion of the estate in 1955, and opened on Pentecost Sunday in 1956 as an inpatient treatment center where catholic religious clergy would receive treatment with the goal of achieving sobriety and returning to active ministry. In 1994, Guest House expanded its services to include women religious.

The farmland and lakes are now mostly parks for Orion Township, Oakland County, and the state of Michigan (Civic Center Park, Orion Oaks and Bald Mountain Recreation Area, respectively). Some of the former farm buildings were converted into the Canterbury Village shopping center.

The airstrip and field used by Earhart is now used as an area for radio controlled airplanes as part of Bald Mountain Recreation Area.

== Austin Ripley ==
Austin Ripley was born on July 25, 1896, in Washington, D.C. He was the youngest of three children, with an older brother and sister, and was raised as a devout Catholic.

At age 12, instead of attending school, Ripley became a page boy in the U.S. House of Representatives, serving Joseph W. Fordney and Speaker Joseph G. “Joe” Cannon. When concerns arose within Ripley’s family about his formal education, he was advised not to return for another year as a page boy. After completing high school, he worked briefly on a farm before becoming a stenographer.

After becoming disinterested in both jobs, Ripley enrolled in a special training course for future salesmen. Following his training, he began working as a salesman for The Life Savers Mints Company, traveling as far as Chicago to sell products to wholesale grocers, outlets, and retailers.

After resigning at age 20, Ripley eventually returned to Washington, D.C., to visit his family. There, he became interested in a new branch of the Army called the Graves Registration Service. Ripley enlisted during World War I and was stationed in France. After the war ended and restoration efforts were underway, Ripley was sent back to Chicago due to poor behavior and inactivity related to his alcohol addiction.

Addiction eventually overtook much of Ripley’s life, leading to inconsistent employment, strained relationships, and periods of instability. He recognized his dependence on alcohol, but his efforts to achieve sobriety came and went. During this time, Ripley married Leone Johannes Ripley in 1933 and began building a successful writing career. He wrote Minute Mysteries, a feature for the Chicago Tribune made up of brief mystery stories with hidden clues. The feature was syndicated in hundreds of newspapers. He also created Photocrime, a picture-based feature for Look magazine that appeared in every issue for 16 years.

Ripley later adapted Minute Mysteries into radio scripts for Gang Busters and published the stories as hardcover books and booklets, which were sold around the world. They were also provided to the Red Cross as recreational reading for soldiers during World War II. He expanded Photocrime into motion picture shorts and created puzzles under the name Observo. This observation-based game was eventually used as a training tool for America’s Armed Forces.

Ripley and his wife, Leone, later moved to Lake Tainter in Eau Claire, Wisconsin, in the hope that the change would support his recovery from alcoholism. As Ripley moved in and out of treatment centers and Alcoholics Anonymous groups, he became increasingly aware that available treatment options were not meeting the unique needs of Catholic priests with alcoholism. This realization led him to pursue a more appropriate treatment setting for priests seeking sobriety and a return to active ministry.

Austin Ripley first developed the concept of Guest House in 1943. The first Guest House was established in Milwaukee, Wisconsin, in 1950, followed by Guest House in Lake Orion, Michigan, in 1956, and Rochester, Minnesota, in 1969. In 1968, Ripley was forced to retire as Guest House’s first President-Director at the Lake Orion location so he could focus on his own health and treatment in Eau Claire, Wisconsin.

In 1972, Ripley underwent surgery to remove cataract from his right eye. During the operation, a hemorrhage occurred, resulting in blindness in that eye. Because he was already partially blind in his left eye, the loss caused difficulty with movement, confusion, and depression. Rip passed away in 1974 at his home on Lake Tainter in Eau Claire, Wisconsin.

== See also ==
- National Register of Historic Places listings in Oakland County, Michigan
