= Transcription (journal) =

- Language: English

Publication details
- Publisher: Taylor & Francis
- Frequency: 5/year

Standard abbreviations
- ISO 4: Transcription

Indexing
- ISSN: 2154-1264 (print); 2154-1272 (web)

Links
- Journal homepage

Transcription is a scientific journal published by Taylor & Francis focusing on the subject of the transcription of DNA. Its stated aim is to publish "high-quality articles that provide novel insights, provocative questions, and new hypotheses into the expanding field of gene transcription".
