= Scripps-Booth =

Defunct American motor vehicle manufacturer

Scripps-Booth Company
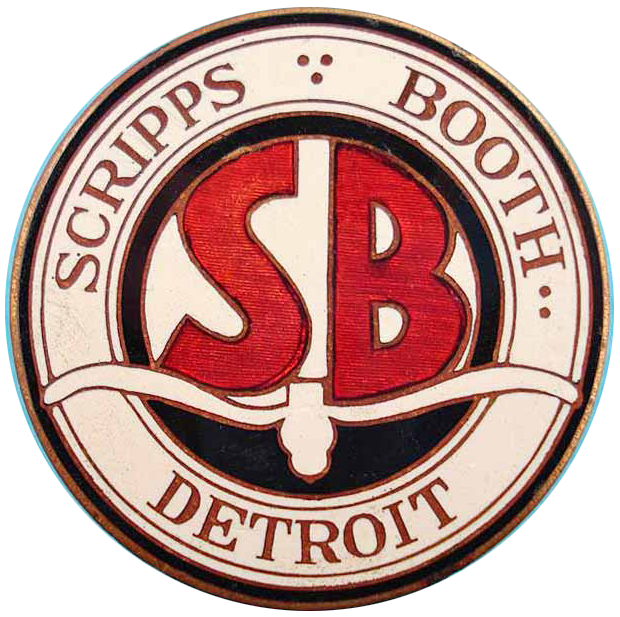
- Type: Division
- Industry: automotive
- Founded: 1913 in Detroit
- Founder: James Scripps Booth
- Defunct: 1923; 103 years ago
- Fate: Acquired by General Motors, then defunct
- Headquarters: Detroit, Michigan, United States
- Key people: James Scripps-Booth, William B. Stout, Alanson P. Brush
- Products: automobiles
- Parent: General Motors

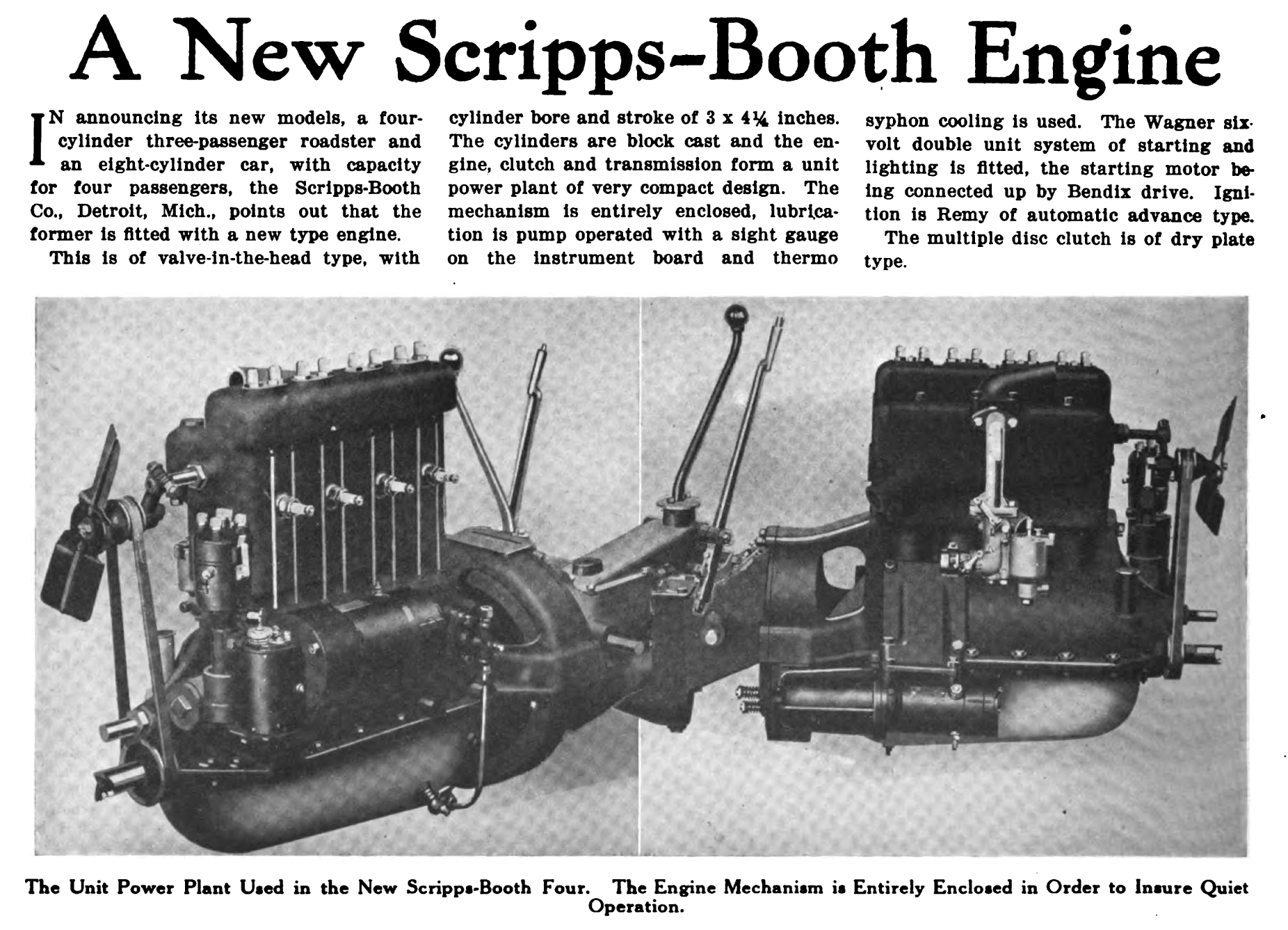
A new Scripps-Booth engine described in the journal Horseless Age, 1916.

Scripps-Booth was a United States automobile marque based in Detroit, Michigan. Established by James Scripps Booth in 1913, Scripps-Booth Company produced motor vehicles and was later acquired by General Motors, becoming a division of it, until the brand was discontinued in 1923.

== History ==
The company was founded by artist and engineer James Scripps Booth (of the Scripps publishing family), who also built the Bi-Autogo. Although the company's first models were cyclecars, Scripps-Booth later produced a "luxurious light car" intended for the luxury market. Designed by William B. Stout, the Model C went on sale in 1915. James Booth next developed a sporting version called Vitesse using the Alanson P. Brush designed Ferro V8, to compete with Mercer and Stutz. The roadster idea was vetoed by company directors and the engine was used in the four-seater Model D instead About one-third of Model C production had been shipped to Europe and Scripps-Booth smaller luxury cars were popular in export markets.

Reliability issues with the Sterling engine in early cars caused the engine to be changed to a Chevrolet 490 in the Model G. James Booth believed the company should build their own engines and when company directors declined to do this, Booth resigned.

In 1916, Scripps-Booth Company consolidated with the Sterling Motor Company to become the publicly traded Scripps-Booth Corporation. By the end of 1917, Scripps-Booth had been purchased by Chevrolet whose founder William C. Durant was also the founding president of Sterling Motor Company. Billy Durant regained control of General Motors and Scripps-Booth became a division of GM with A. H. Sarver as president.

The Scripps-Booth cars were now built with Oakland chassis and Northway engines. With the departure of Durant from GM in 1921, Alfred P. Sloan could not find a use for Scripps-Booth in the GM line-up and discontinued the brand name in 1922. The factory was converted to build Buicks. Approximately 60,000 Scripps-Booths had been produced.

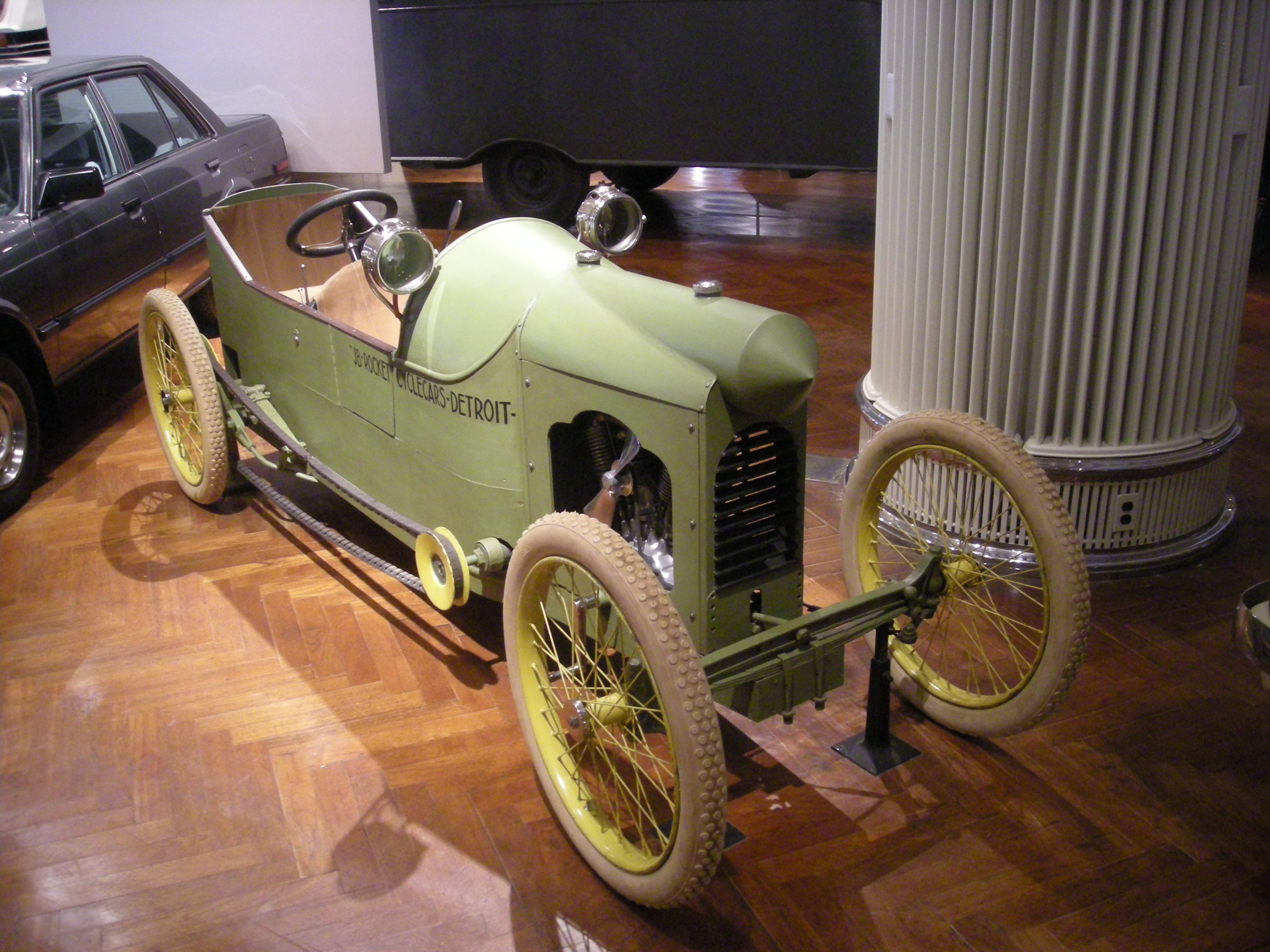
1913 Scripps-Booth Rocket Cyclecar at the Henry Ford Museum

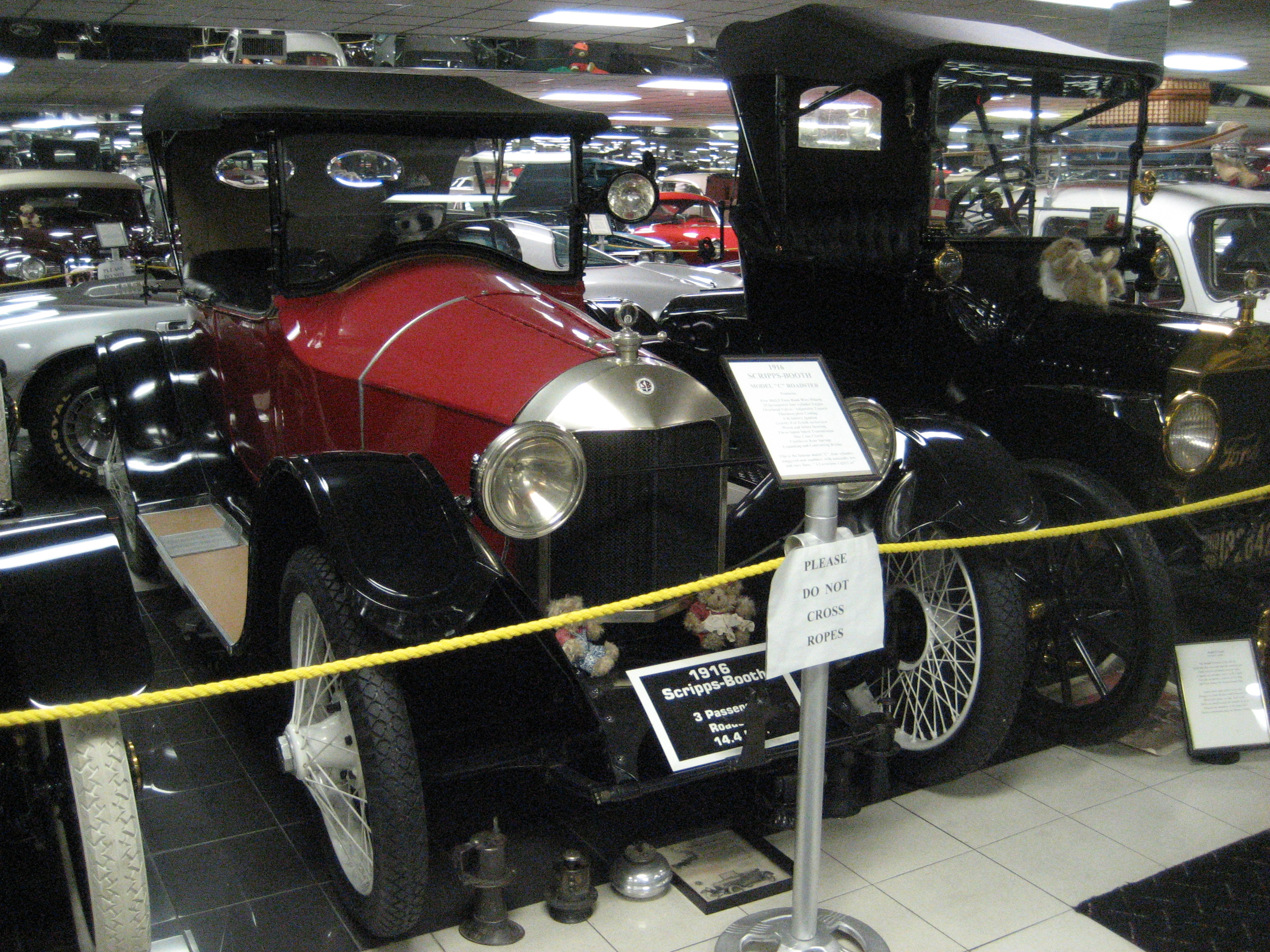
1916 Scripps-Booth Model C Roadster at Tallahassee Automobile Museum

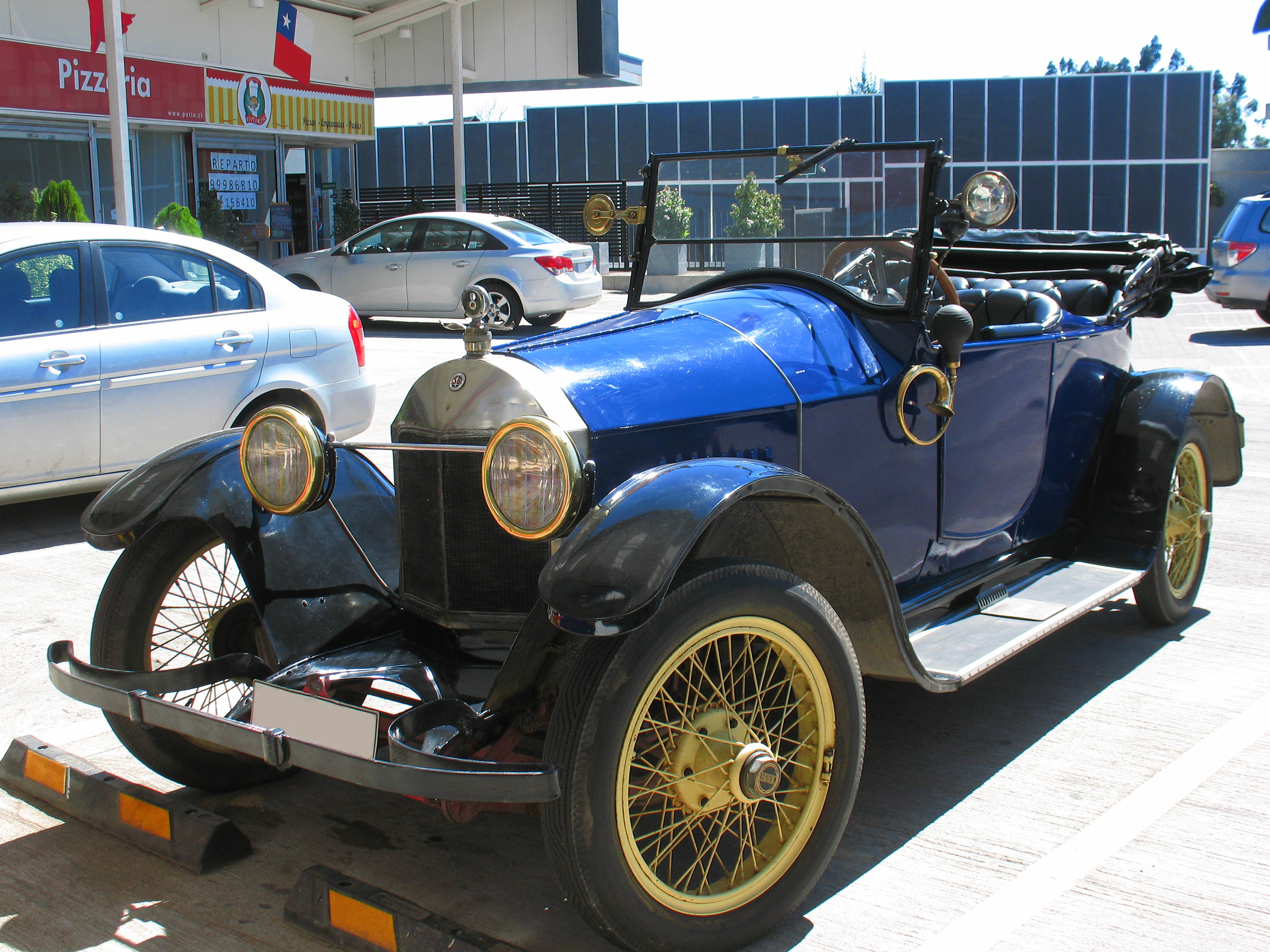
1918 Scripps-Booth Model D roadster in Chile

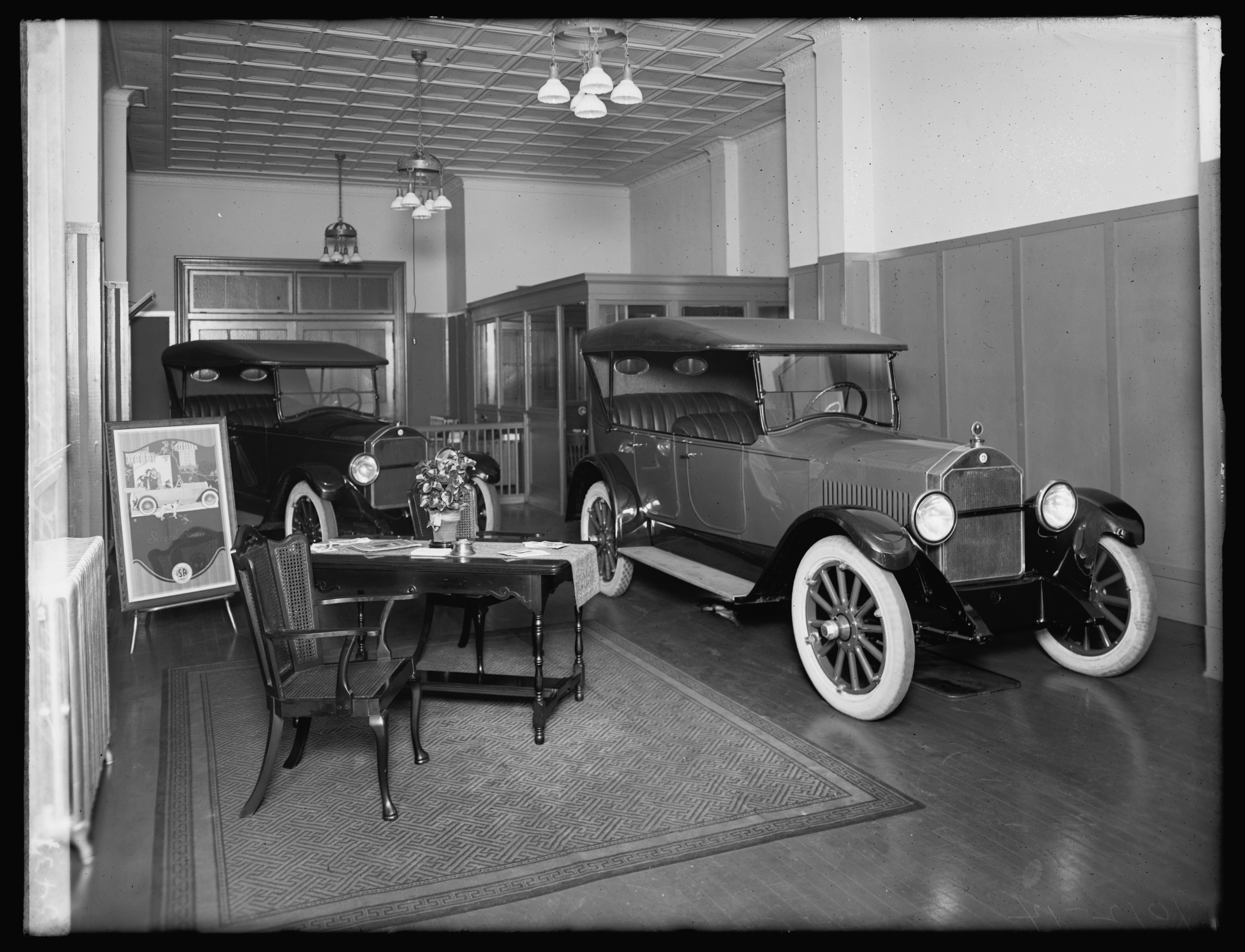
A 1920s Scripps-Booth showroom

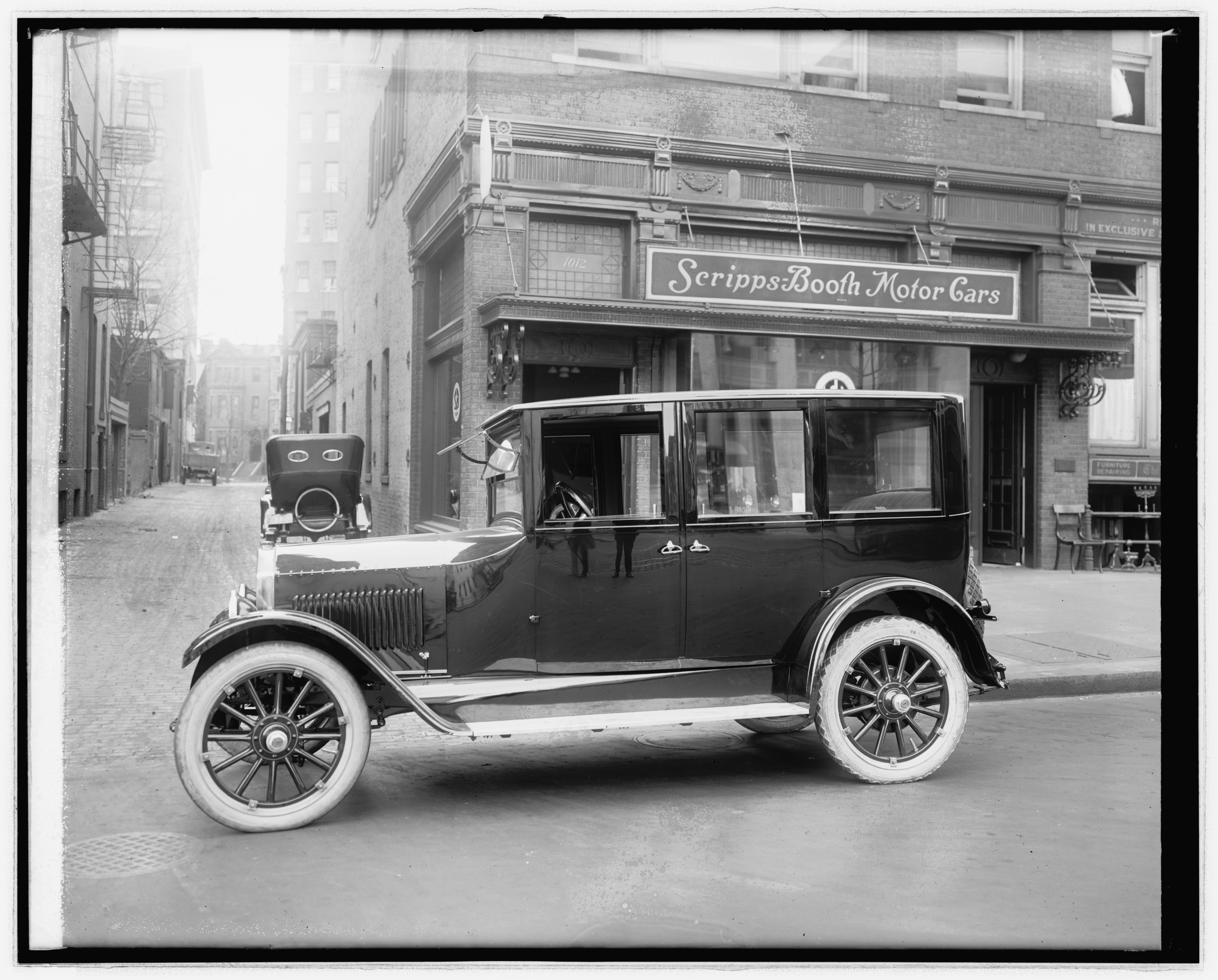
1921 Scripps-Booth sedan in front of a showroom

== Vehicles ==
The Vintage Chevrolet Club of America accepts the following Scripps-Booth models:

- Model C Roadster, 1915–17
- Model G Roadster, 1917–19
- Model D 4 Passenger Roadster, 1916–17
- Model H 4 Passenger, 4 Door Touring, 1918

For 1914, Scripps-Booth offered a three-passenger torpedo roadster, powered by a 103 in^{3} (1702 cc) (2 7/8×4-inch, 3 1/2×102 mm) 18 hp (13 kW) water-cooled four-cylinder of valve-in-head design with Zenith carburetor and Atwater-Kent automatic spark advance. It featured a 110 in (2794 mm) wheelbase and 30×3 1/2-inch (76×8.8-cm) Houk detachable wire wheels, with three speeds and shaft drive. With complete electrical equipment, from Bijur starter to ignition (on a separate switch from starter) to headlights to Klaxet electric horn (with a button in the steering hub, rather than a bulb) to pushbutton door locks, it sold for US$775, equivalent to $24,911 in 2025

The 1916-17 Model D was powered by an overhead valve V8 engine designed by Alanson Brush.

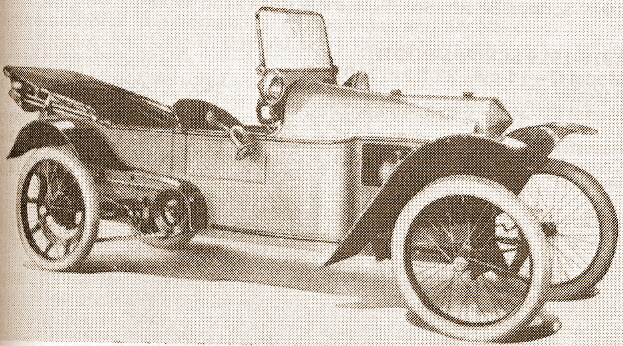
1914 Scripps-Booth Rocket Cyclecar

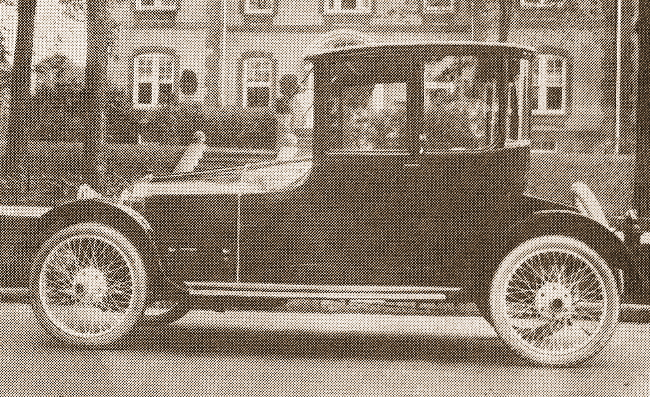
1915 Sripps-Booth Coupe

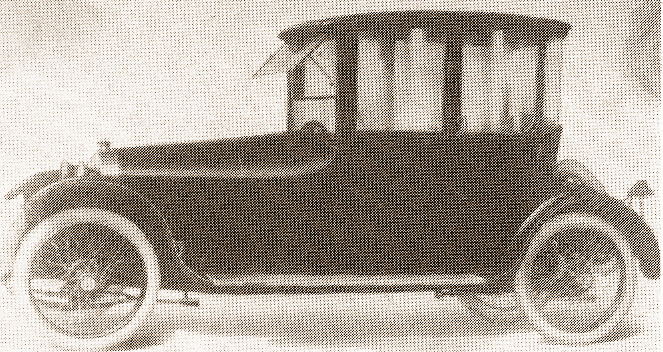
1916 Scripps-Booth Coupe

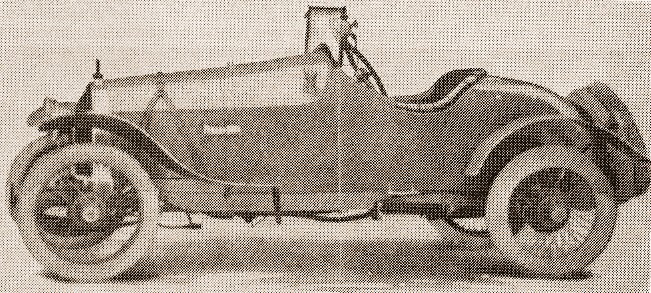
1916 Scripps-Booth Vitesse Roadster

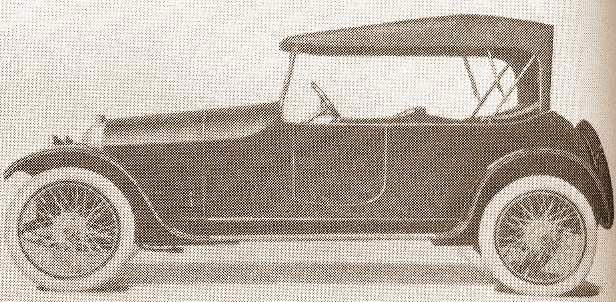
1917Scripps-booth Model D

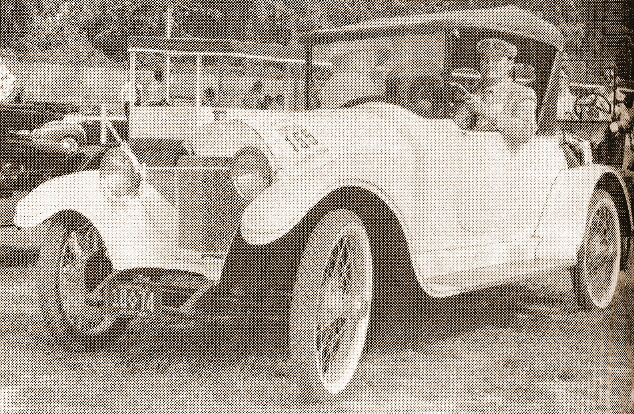
1918 Scripps-Booth Roadster

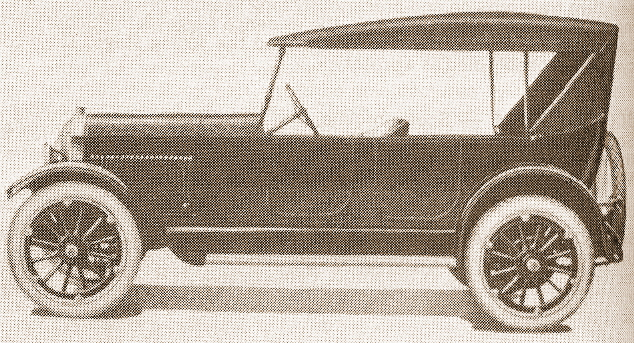
1919 Scripps-Booth Six-39

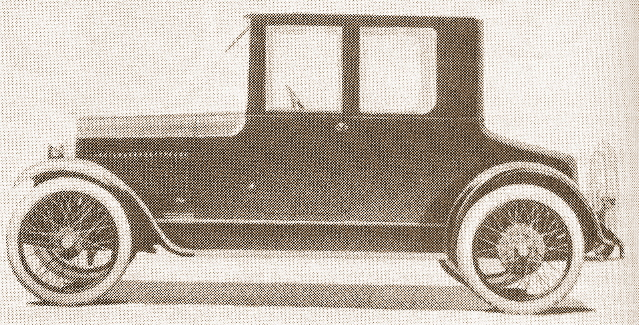
1920 Scripps Booth Model B-45 Coupe

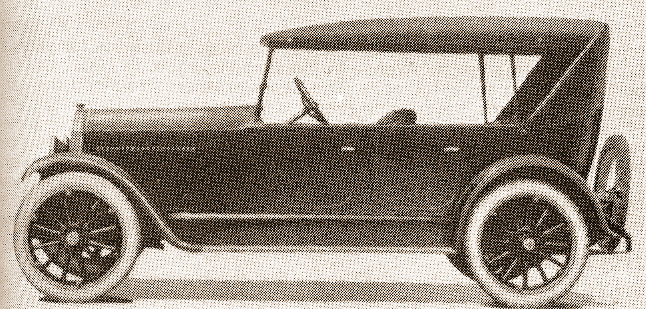
1921 Scripps-Booth Model B-39

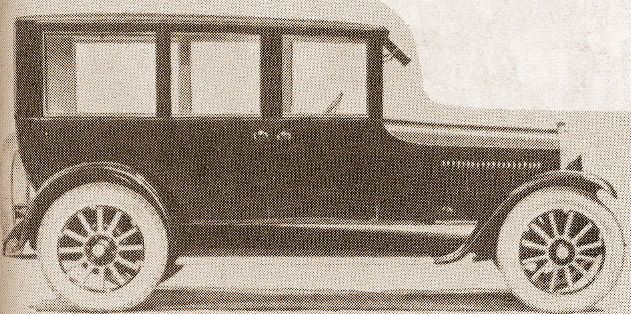
1922 Scripps-Booth Model F-45

== In popular culture ==
Before marrying the main character in John O'Hara's 1934 novel Appointment in Samarra, a youthful Caroline Walker drives a Scripps-Booth Model C Roadster. The car's unusual seating arrangement, in which "the driver sat a foot or so forward of the other seat, which made kissing an awkward act", is especially noted.

Groucho Marx owned a Scripps-Booth.

== See also ==
- Bi-Autogo
