= Narrative crime script =

A narrative crime script is a step-by-step account of the procedures and decision-making processes involved in a particular event, usually relating to an illegal activity.

It is constructed using a logical sequence of events that is easily interpreted by an observer to make themselves a participant viewer. For instance, an observer doesn't need to see firefighters at a burnt house to know they were there.

== Criminology ==
The script-theoretic approach was proposed by Cornish in 1994 as a way to better understand how crimes are committed and how to prevent them. The central element of this approach, the crime script, is a step-by-step account of the actions and decisions involved in a crime.

Crime scripts have been represented in various forms: text/paragraphs, tables and flowchart diagrams.

Crimes have been scripted in the following areas:

- Cybercrime
- Corruption and fraud offences
- Robbery and theft offences
- Drug offences
- Environmental crimes
- Violent crimes
- Sexual offences
- Other

A framework was proposed by Borrion for the evaluation of crime scripts that considers the following properties of crime scripts: typology, traceability, transparency, consistency, context, completeness, parsimony, precision, uncertainty, usability, ambiguity, and accuracy.

== News scripts ==
It is constructed using a logical sequence of events that is easily interpreted by an observer to make themselves a participant viewer. For instance, an observer doesn't need to see firefighters at a burnt house to know there were there.

The format of a news crime script is divided into three sections:

The first section starts with the broadcaster delivering a brief announcement of the event of the crime, consisting of basic information that is relevant to the story. This is usually presented with an anchorperson introducing the story in a news segment.

The second section gives the viewer a supported account of the event. This often includes broadcasting images and video that is related to the event and using supporting statements and accounts from family members, bystanders, and witnesses. The purpose of this phase is to expand on the information given in the first section and to support the details included in the original report.

Third, the focus shifts to the identity of the suspect, and the actions taken to apprehend the perpetrator. This includes the description of any suspects or collected leads. It is often in this section that the biases of the report are most apparent.

The majority of research concerning the narrative script of crime reporting is focused on the viewers of the newscast. Research showed that narrative script crime reporting is receptive to racial stereotypes. In a study where subjects were shown broadcasts in keeping with the narrative crime script model, the majority of subjects recalled the race of the suspect as being of color. This was inconsistent with the broadcast which did not always show a colored suspect, if any suspect at all.

A 2000 study tried to relate exposure to local news and viewers fear of crime. Instead, it was found that factors such as gender, socioeconomic status, current place of residence and past exposure to criminals were far more determinant in an individual's relative fear of crime.
