= Lake Orion, Michigan =

Village in the United States

- Village
- Village of Lake Orion
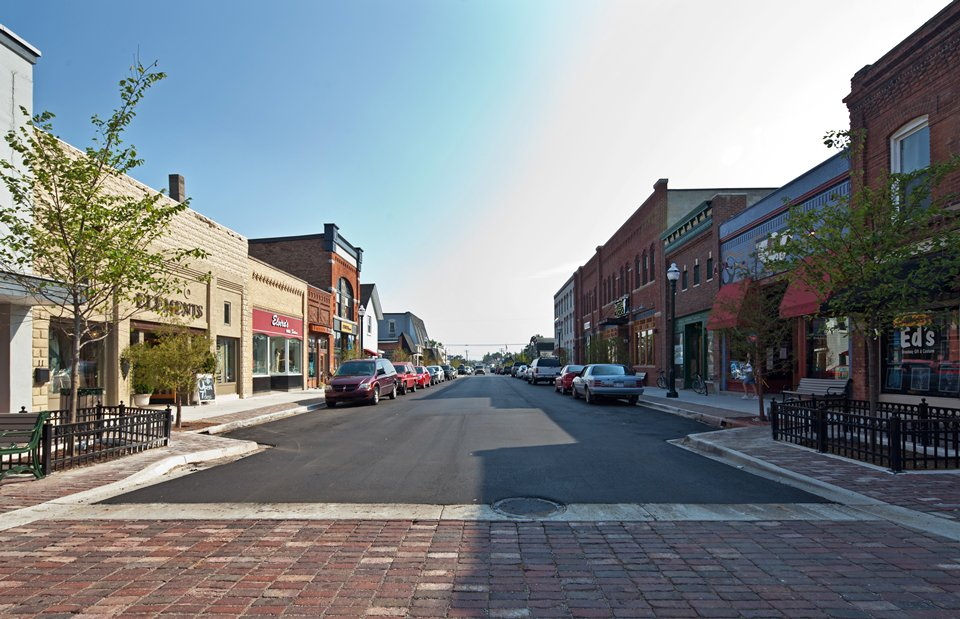
- Looking south along Broadway Street

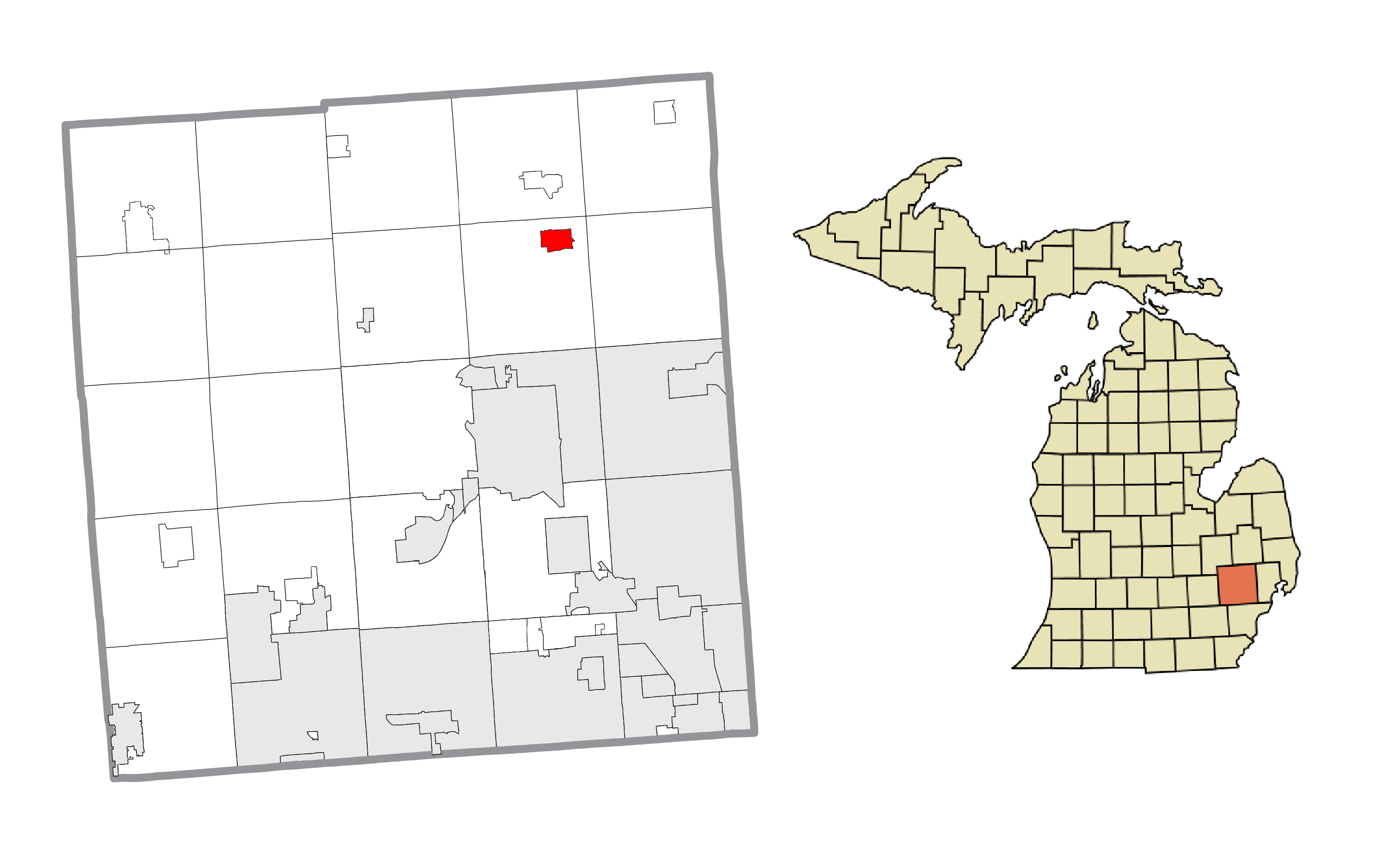
- Location within Oakland County

- Location within the state of Michigan
- Coordinates: 42°47′03″N 83°14′44″W
- Country: United States
- State: Michigan
- County: Oakland
- Township: Orion
- Incorporated: 1859

Government
  - Type: Council/Manager
  - President: Jerry Narsh
  - Manager: Darwin D. P. McClary

Area
  - Village: 1.32 sq mi (3.42 km^{2})
  - Land: 0.79 sq mi (2.05 km^{2})
  - Water: 0.53 sq mi (1.37 km^{2})
- Elevation: 980 ft (300 m)

Population (2020)
  - Village: 2,886
  - Density: 3,631.9/sq mi (1,402.29/km^{2})
  - Metro: 4,296,250 (Metro Detroit)
- Time zone: UTC-5 (EST)
  - Summer (DST): UTC-4 (EDT)
- ZIP code(s): 48362
- Area codes: 248 and 947
- FIPS code: 26-44940
- GNIS feature ID: 0629989
- Website: Official website

Lake Orion (/ˈɒriən/ ORR-ee-ən) is a village in the northern outskirts of Metro Detroit in Oakland County, Michigan, United States. As of the 2020 census, Lake Orion had a population of 2,876. "Lake Orion" can refer to either the village or the much larger Orion Township, of which the village is a part.

Lake Orion began as a resort town and over time has incorporated elements of a bedroom community.

== History ==
Judah Church and Moses (or Samuel) Munson were among the first settlers. Munson, who arrived in 1824, built a sawmill in 1825, and planted the first orchard. Jesse Decker arrived from upstate New York with his wife, Mary, in 1825. He was energetic and became "everything to everybody", so that the place soon became known as "Decker's Settlement" and the town "Canandaigua," after Canandaigua, New York, where the settlers originated. The settlement grew into a bustling commercial center with a sawmill, tavern, post office, general store, blacksmith shop, school and cemetery. In 1828, a power dam was built uniting several small lakes and forming the mile-wide Lake Canandaigua, just west of the village.

In 1830, Decker raised the first frame barn in the area, with local Native Americans' help. The first post office was opened in 1832, with Decker as postmaster. In 1835, the community's name was changed from Canandaigua to Orion, and Lake Canandaigua was renamed Lake Orion. The new name was chosen by the village's attorney. The same year, the Township of Orion was formally approved by the Michigan Territorial government. Decker became the first Supervisor of Orion, with a salary of $2 a year. By 1836, two persons were licensed to keep taverns in the town, one of whom was Decker. He was elected to the first Michigan House of Representatives in 1837 and also served as justice of the peace for the Orion area. By 1840 Decker owned 440 acres (1.8 km^{2}) of land.

In 1909 a Marine Postal Center was established, with mail delivered to over 300 cottages on the lake and islands by boat. Lake Orion was the first town in the United States to have this service.

In 1929, Amelia Earhart visited Lake Orion at the invitation of Orion resident and fellow aviator William Edmund Scripps. While visiting Scripps Mansion, she flew an experimental glider. Also in 1929, the village known as "Orion" was officially renamed "Lake Orion."

=== Railroads and trails ===
The Village of Lake Orion was served by trains on the Michigan Central Railroad from 1872 to 1976, and the Detroit United Railway interurban system from 1899 to 1931. Each service had its own track and depot, although both were named "Orion" and in the village near the intersection of M-24 and Flint Street. Lake Orion also had a flag stop, Rudds Station, on the MCC line east of the village near Clarkston and Kern Roads. Rudds Station served Rudds Mill, a milling operation on Paint Creek that produced wheat. The MCR line ran from Detroit to Mackinaw City, and the Flint Division of the DUR line ran from Royal Oak to Flint. With the automobile's increased popularity and the paving of M-24 in 1929, passenger service on the DUR ended in 1931, and track was scrapped during the 1940s for a World War II metal drive. Little remains of the corridor. The MCR line maintained passenger service until 1950, and freight service continued until the 1970s. The MCC track passed through New York Central and Penn Central and operated until 1976, when it was closed after acquisition by Conrail. The original MCR rails and track east of M-24 were completely removed, and the line from the village south toward Rochester, now serves as the recreational Paint Creek Trail. The line from the village north to Oxford exists now only as a narrow path, but still passes over the historic Indian Lake Road Stone Arch Bridge, a small limestone bridge constructed over Indian Lake Road in 1891.

Lake Orion was also served by trains on the Grand Trunk Western Railroad. The Polly Ann line ran from Pontiac to Caseville, passing through western Orion Township. Two flag stop stations served Lake Orion on the Polly Ann line. Eames Station was near the intersection of Joslyn and Silverbell Roads, and Cole Station was near the intersection of Joslyn and Clarkston Roads. A short section of the track was still in use as of 2014, operated by Canadian National Railway specifically to connect the General Motors Orion Assembly plant with the CN main line in Pontiac, but all track north of Orion Assembly was eliminated and removed by 1985. In 1993, a Rails to Trails federal grant was awarded and matched by the Michigan Department of Natural Resources, providing more than $728,000 to purchase the right-of-way from Grand Trunk. The corridor now serves as the recreational Polly Ann Trail, connecting Lake Orion with Oxford, Addison Township, and Leonard.

=== Amusement park ===
Lake Orion as a resort and amusement destination in the early 20th century

Lake Orion was an amusement destination for residents of Metro Detroit in the first half of the century. The addition of the Michigan Central Railroad track in 1872 set the stage for Lake Orion as a major summertime resort for those traveling on the line, especially between Detroit and Flint. In 1874, several prominent citizens formed the Orion Park Association to capitalize on the growing number of travelers to the area. They developed a park on the shore of the lake (now Green's Park) near the train depot and operated a steam-powered boat for lake excursions and delivery to Park Island. Over time, the Park Island Amusement Park grew to include a penny arcade, carousel, souvenir booths, refreshment booths, lunch stands, dining rooms, dance halls, and a wooden roller coaster named "The Thriller."

The swimming beach on the north side of Park Island had both a men's and ladies' bathhouse, a waterslide, and numerous diving boards, the highest 42 feet above the water. Lake Orion was stocked annually with bass, pickerel, and pike, and fishing tournaments and contests were held seasonally. Several double-deck boats, including the "City of Orion," offered lake excursions replete with bands and a dance floor on the upper deck. At night, Park Island was illuminated by strings of thousands of lights.

Once a premier destination among vacationers, the park suffered through the Great Depression and several fires, gradually losing business before closing in 1955. The park was owned by the Detroit Edison Company (via the purchase of a subsidiary, the Orion Power and Light company) from 1912 until closure. The island and park property were later purchased by a private real estate developer who built homes on the island in the 1960s. In many brochures and newspaper advertisements in the 1910s and 1920s, Lake Orion was advertised to potential travelers as the "Venice of the Middle West," "Paris of Detroit," and "Lake Orion, the One Best Resort".

=== Folklore ===
The story of the Lake Orion Dragon says that sometime in the 1800s, a group of local children played a prank by building a fake dragon and launching it on the lake. A number of people saw it and soon Lake Orion was known for its dragon. There are competing stories about who made it and how it was built, but most agreed that a Levi A. Wild was responsible.

"That same year [1894] the Lake Orion 'dragon' made its entrance into Orion history. First seen by two ladies near the present Robert's Rondevoo cove, the animal grew in length as the story grew in listeners. What had started out as an average-sized lake monster was claimed by some to be at least eighty feet long. Detroit and other newspapers joshingly suggested, upon hearing of the behemoth, that Orion residents should 'drink more well-water in the future.'" The nickname of Lake Orion High School's sports teams (the Dragons) derives from this.

== Geography ==
According to the United States Census Bureau, the village has a total area of 1.30 square miles (3.37 km^{2}), of which 0.79 square miles (2.05 km^{2}) is land and 0.51 square miles (1.32 km^{2}) is water.

=== Lake Orion ===
Lake Orion
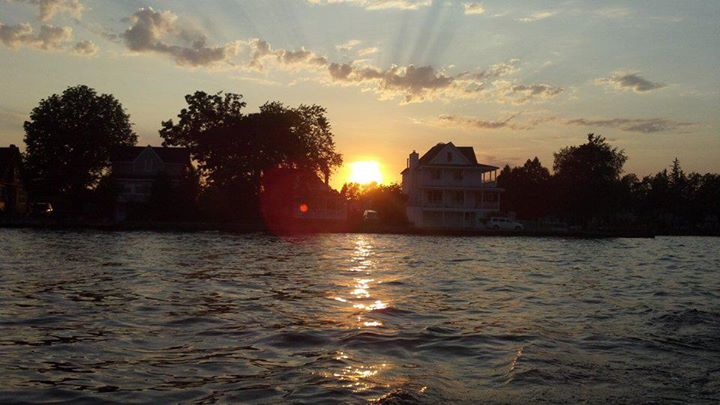
- Lake Orion aka Orion Lake

- Location within Michigan
- Location: Lake Orion, Michigan
- Coordinates: 42°47′N 83°15′W
- Basin countries: U.S.
- Surface area: 495.5 acres (200.5 ha)
- Max. depth: 80 ft (24 m)
- Settlements: Village of Lake Orion, Michigan

Lake Orion (less commonly known as "Orion Lake") is a medium-sized inland lake, with area of 495.5 acres. It has a maximum depth of 80 feet and an average depth of 16 feet. The lake is located within the Village of Lake Orion and Orion Township. It is the eighth largest lake by area in Oakland County.

The current area of the lake was formed by a collection of smaller lakes over time, beginning with the damming of Paint Creek in the 1830s. Canals have also been dredged to maximize lake frontage.

There is a public access boat launch on the northern side of the lake. It is administered by the Michigan Department of Natural Resources.

==== Islands ====
There are several islands in Lake Orion, some of which feature seasonal and year-round residences. The largest islands, Bellevue and Park, are connected to the mainland by two-lane bridges and are populated year-round. Most boats can pass under the Bellevue Bridge, which has a clearance of 9.6 feet. The Park Island bridge has a lower clearance that allows only canoes, kayaks and rowboats to pass underneath. The remaining islands are reachable only by watercraft. Victoria Island is the third largest island, and is home to several seasonal and year-round homes. A smaller island, Paint Island, was home to a single residence from the 1850s to the 1950s. Little remains of the island due to erosion save for a solitary tree, and the shallow waters can be a hazard to boaters. Sweet's Island is home to the Lake Orion Boat Club, and features a private boathouse and docks for LOBC members. Romance Island is home to a single cottage, Preston Island to two seasonal cottages, Dot Island to one seasonal cottage and Armada Island to four seasonal cottages. The residences on all islands except for Bellevue and Park require the use of watercraft to travel to and from the mainland.

== Demographics ==
Historical population
Census	Pop.	Note	%±
1860	292		—
1870	304		4.1%
1880	429		41.1%
1890	522		21.7%
1900	756		44.8%
1910	717		−5.2%
1920	929		29.6%
1930	1,369		47.4%
1940	1,933		41.2%
1950	2,385		23.4%
1960	2,698		13.1%
1970	2,921		8.3%
1980	2,907		−0.5%
1990	3,057		5.2%
2000	2,715		−11.2%
2010	2,973		9.5%
2020	2,876		−3.3%
U.S. Decennial Census

The demographics below are for the village only. Refer to Orion Township for the demographics of the entire township.

=== 2020 census ===
As of the 2020 census, Lake Orion had a population of 2,876. The median age was 45.0 years. 17.6% of residents were under the age of 18 and 19.2% of residents were 65 years of age or older. For every 100 females there were 94.5 males, and for every 100 females age 18 and over there were 91.1 males age 18 and over.

100.0% of residents lived in urban areas, while 0.0% lived in rural areas.

There were 1,295 households in Lake Orion, of which 24.5% had children under the age of 18 living in them. Of all households, 39.2% were married-couple households, 23.4% were households with a male householder and no spouse or partner present, and 30.4% were households with a female householder and no spouse or partner present. About 38.1% of all households were made up of individuals and 14.3% had someone living alone who was 65 years of age or older.

There were 1,454 housing units, of which 10.9% were vacant. The homeowner vacancy rate was 1.4% and the rental vacancy rate was 5.2%.

Racial composition as of the 2020 census
Race	Number	Percent
White	2,583	89.8%
Black or African American	29	1.0%
American Indian and Alaska Native	3	0.1%
Asian	39	1.4%
Native Hawaiian and Other Pacific Islander	0	0.0%
Some other race	49	1.7%
Two or more races	173	6.0%
Hispanic or Latino (of any race)	158	5.5%

=== 2010 census ===
As of the census of 2010, there were 2,973 people, 1,304 households, and 709 families residing in the village. The population density was 3,763.3 inhabitants per square mile (1,453.0/km^{2}). There were 1,483 housing units at an average density of 1,877.2 units per square mile (724.8 units/km^{2}). The racial makeup of the village was 94.2% White, 1.6% African American, 0.2% Native American, 1.1% Asian, 0.9% from other races, and 2.0% from two or more races. Hispanic or Latino of any race were 3.5% of the population.

There were 1,304 households, of which 27.0% had children under the age of 18 living with them, 40.0% were married couples living together, 10.7% had a female householder with no husband present, 3.8% had a male householder with no wife present, and 45.6% were non-families. 38.0% of all households were made up of individuals, and 11.7% had someone living alone who was 65 years of age or older. The average household size was 2.19 and the average family size was 2.93.

The median age in the village was 41.2 years. 20.6% of residents were under the age of 18; 7.8% were between the ages of 18 and 24; 27.9% were from 25 to 44; 27.5% were from 45 to 64; and 16.2% were 65 years of age or older. The gender makeup of the village was 47.5% male and 52.5% female.

== Government ==
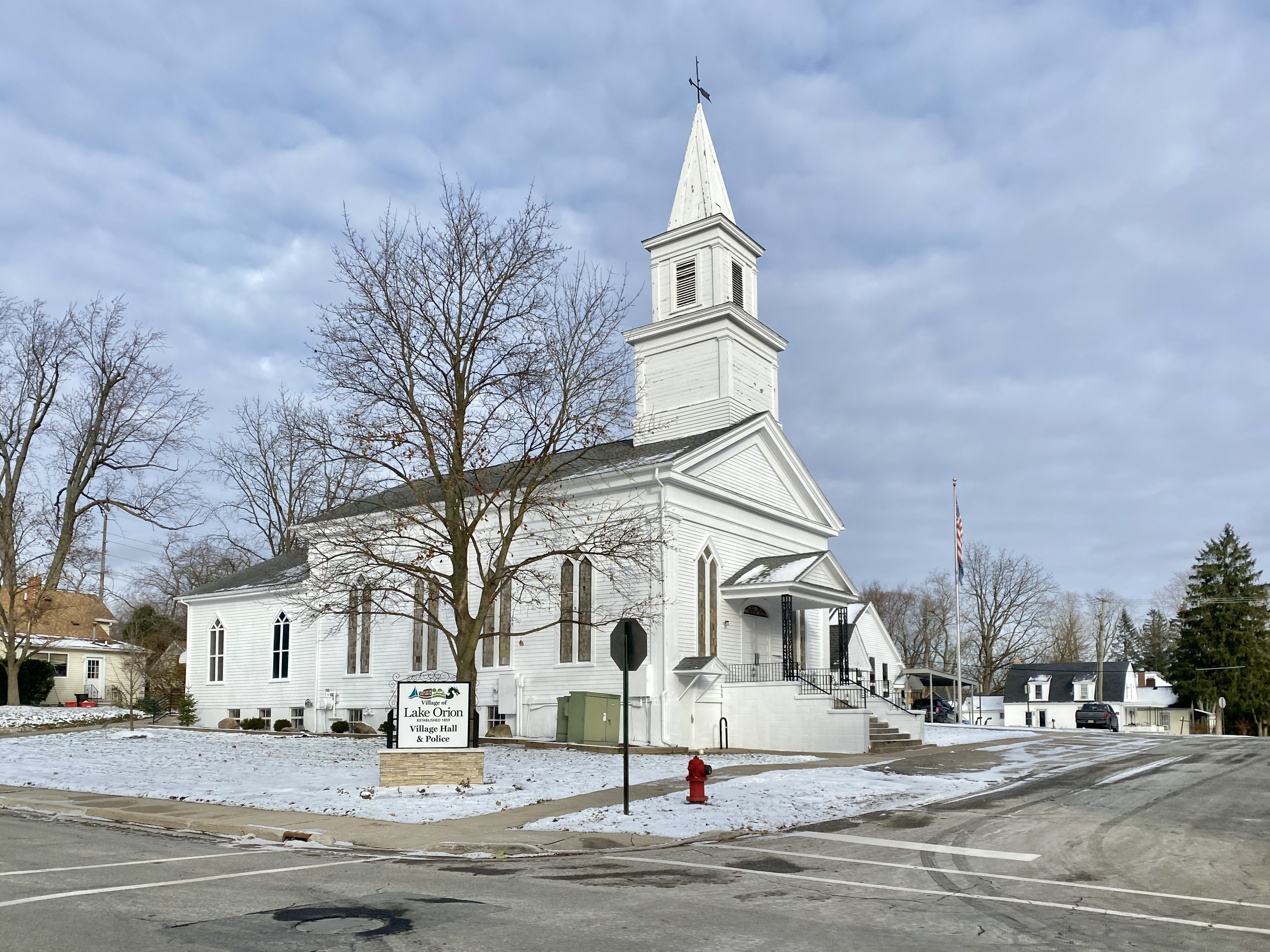
Lake Orion Village Hall

As a village, Lake Orion is provided assessing, counties and school districts tax collecting and elections administration for county, state, and national by Orion Township. The Village of Lake Orion is a Michigan home rule village with a council-manager form of government. The village is governed by a local charter adopted by village electors. The village's legislative body is its village council, comprising a President and six council members. The village council appoints a Village Manager to serve as the Chief Administrative Officer of the government responsible for the management of the village's daily operations and oversight of all departments. Current Village Manager Darwin McClary was appointed in November 2022 after having previously served as Manager from 2013 to 2017.

Lake Orion is served by the Lake Orion Community Schools school district.

== Notable people ==
This list includes people from Orion Township and the Village of Lake Orion

- Keith Aldridge, former professional hockey player
- Scott Amedure, The Jenny Jones Show guest and murder victim
- Trevor Blaylock, United States Marine Corps Forces Special Operations Command
- Christopher Bowman, U.S. Winter Olympian, National Champion, World Medalist champion figure skater
- William Broomfield, former congressman
- Pat Caputo, sportswriter for The Oakland Press, radio personality at WXYT-FM
- Rolla C. Carpenter, engineer, academic, writer
- Dave Collins, former professional baseball player, former coach at Lake Orion High School
- Barbara Ann Crancer, associate circuit court judge, daughter of Jimmy Hoffa
- Nicole Curtis, host of DIY and HGTV's home renovation show Rehab Addict
- Matthew Dear, musician
- Andrew J. Feustel, NASA astronaut
- Frontier Ruckus, art-folk band
- Tom Gillis, professional golfer
- Jeff Heath, professional football player
- Frederick Henderson, former CEO of General Motors
- James P. Hoffa, International Brotherhood of Teamsters President, son of Jimmy Hoffa
- Jimmy Hoffa (family summer home), former International Brotherhood of Teamsters President
- Zak Keasey, former professional football player
- Scott Kowalkowski, former professional football player
- Mickey Lolich, former professional baseball player and donut shop owner
- James Marcinkowski, politician, attorney, former CIA case officer
- Chris "Hot Wings" Michels, syndicated radio show host
- Jamie Milam, professional hockey player
- Troy Milam, professional hockey player
- Frank Novak, former NFL coach
- Shannon Pettypiece, White House correspondent for Bloomberg LP
- Raymond Plouhar, staff sergeant, USMC
- William Edmund Scripps, newspaper magnate
- Rich Strenger, lawyer, former professional football player
- Rod Taylor, former professional hockey player
- Ron Tripp, World sambo and judo champion; president of USA Judo
- Cynthia Watros, actress
- Mike Weger, business owner, real estate developer, former professional football player
- Della Woods, drag racer

== See also ==
- List of cities, villages, and townships in Michigan
