= Paint Creek (Oakland County, Michigan) =

Coordinates: 42.67725°N 83.12827°W

Location
- Country: United States
- State: Michigan
- Counties: Oakland

Physical characteristics
- Mouth: Clinton River
  - location: Rochester, Michigan

Basin features
- Progression: Clinton River → Lake St. Clair → Detroit River → Lake Erie → Niagara River → Lake Ontario → St. Lawrence River → Gulf of St. Lawrence / Atlantic Ocean
- Waterbodies: Lake Orion

Paint Creek is a 16.8-mile-long (27.0 km) stream in the U.S. state of Michigan, located in northern Oakland County and rising in Brandon Township in the northern part of the county. The creek drains through a series of lakes that lead into Lake Orion. Paint Creek continues as the outflow from the east end of Lake Orion in downtown Lake Orion. It flows southeastward through Oakland Township and Rochester Hills into the Clinton River in Rochester.

The damming of Paint Creek in the village of Lake Orion in 1839 resulted in the expansion of Lake Canadaigua. The newly created larger lake was renamed Lake Orion (or Orion Lake) after the village.

It is one of two designated trout streams in Oakland County, the other being Trout Creek. The water level of the creek is dependent upon rainfall, and can vary from very shallow to deep and rapid depending on recent weather conditions. Fishermen can expect to catch brown trout and rainbow trout, as well as creek chubs.

There are two other streams of the same name in Michigan, Paint Creek in Washtenaw County and Paint Creek in Iron County in the Upper Peninsula.

== See also ==
- List of rivers of Michigan
