= Club for Growth =

American political advocacy group

Coordinates: 38°54′15″N 77°02′43″W

- Established: 1999
- Founder: Harlan Crow; Stephen Moore; Thomas L. "Dusty" Rhodes; Richard Gilder
- Tax ID no.: 20-4681603
- Headquarters: 2001 L St NW Ste 600; Washington, DC 20036-4967
- Location: Washington, D.C.
- President: David Martin McIntosh
- Website: www.clubforgrowth.org

The Club for Growth is a 501(c)(4) political organization active in the United States, with a fiscally conservative agenda focused on tax cuts and other economic policy issues.

The club has two political arms: Club for Growth PAC, a traditional political action committee, and Club for Growth Action, an independent-expenditure only committee or super-PAC.

According to its website, the Club for Growth's policy goals include cutting income tax rates, repealing the estate tax, supporting limited government and a balanced budget amendment, entitlement reform (including Social Security reform, Medicare and Medicaid reform), tort reform, school choice, and deregulation.

The Club for Growth PAC endorses and raises money for candidates who meet its standards for fiscal conservatism. According to Politico, "The Club for Growth is the pre-eminent institution promoting Republican adherence to a free-market, free-trade, anti-regulation agenda."

== History ==
The Club for Growth was founded in 1999 by Stephen Moore, Thomas L. Rhodes, and Richard Gilder. Moore served as the first president of the Club from 1999 until December 2004, when board members voted to remove Moore as president. In 2003 through 2004, the Club for Growth was the largest single fundraiser for Republican House and Senate candidates, outside of the Republican Party itself, raising nearly $22 million.

Future Pennsylvania United States Senator Pat Toomey served as president from 2005 until his resignation in April 2009. Former Indiana Congressman Chris Chocola succeeded Toomey. Chocola served as president through December 2014. He remains a member of the Club's board. Former Indiana Congressman David McIntosh was named president in January 2015.

On September 19, 2005, the Federal Election Commission (FEC) filed suit against the Club for Growth alleging violations of the Federal Election Campaign Act for failing to register as a political action committee in the 2000, 2002, and 2004 congressional elections. In September 2007, the Citizens Club for Growth (the Club for Growth changed its name) and the FEC agreed to settle the lawsuit. According to the Associated Press, the settlement was one of "a series of actions by the FEC to penalize independent political groups that spent money to influence elections but did not register as political committees. The groups, called 527 organizations for the section of the IRS code...played a significant role in the 2004 congressional and presidential elections by raising unlimited amounts of money from labor groups, corporations and wealthy individuals."

In 2010, the Club's political arms spent about $8.6 million directly on candidates and bundled another $6 million from Club members, directing those funds to candidates. In 2012, according to OpenSecrets, Club members donated at least $4 million, and the Club's political arms spent nearly $18 million on elections.

In 2013, the Club for Growth super PAC's donors included Peter Thiel, an early backer of Facebook and a co-founder of PayPal, who gave $2 million; Virginia James ($1.2 million); John W. Childs ($1.1 million), chairman and founder of the Boston-based private equity firm J.W. Childs Associates; Robert D. Arnott ($750,000), the chairman and chief executive of California-based Research Affiliates; Robert Mercer, the co-chief executive of Renaissance Technologies and part-owner of Cambridge Analytica, gave $600,000; and hedge fund manager Paul Singer gave $100,000.

The Club for Growth's super PAC, which historically has been most active in Republican primary elections, spent more in general elections in the 2018 cycle than it ever had before. This trend was expected to continue into 2020. Club for Growth president David McIntosh described the Club's evolution, saying "We want to be the political arm of the conservative movement—inside the Republican Party."

In June 2020, The Hill wrote that the Club was "flexing its financial muscle this year, doling out millions of dollars to conservative congressional candidates and outspending most other outside groups as it looks to help the GOP keep control of the Senate and improve Republican chances in the House." The Club for Growth raised $55 million in 2020, "making 2020 its most lucrative cycle yet." The Club, which said it planned to spend at least $35 million in the 2020 election cycle, outspent most other groups not affiliated with presidential candidates. According to a Guardian analysis, the organization was one of the biggest backers of the Republican lawmakers who tried to overturn the 2020 US election results. It spent $20 million to support its campaigns in 2018 and 2020. One of the largest donors was Jeff Yass who in 2020 donated $20.7 million to the Club. As of 2021, the Club for Growth's largest funders were Yass and Richard Uihlein.

== Mission ==
Founder Stephen Moore has said, "We want to be seen as the tax cut enforcer in the [Republican] party." Unlike many other political action committees, the Club for Growth's PAC regularly participates in funding candidates for primary elections. The Club focuses more on open seats than on challenging sitting Republicans, but it has helped to unseat a number of incumbent Republicans. The Club for Growth has established a vetting process for potential candidates that involves one or more interviews, research on the race and the candidate's record, and a poll conducted to establish whether the candidate has a viable chance for victory. Each election cycle, the Club's PAC endorses candidates and encourages donors to support the endorsed candidates. Promoting a more conservative agenda, the Club is known for targeting "establishment" Republican candidates.

== Issue advocacy ==
=== 2003 ===
In 2003, the original Club for Growth strongly opposed the Medicare prescription drug benefit proposal. The Club for Growth strongly supported the Bush tax cuts of 2003 and ran television ads against two Republicans who voiced opposition to the tax cuts. According to The New York Times, "Last spring, [Club for Growth president Steve] Moore attacked two Republican Senators who were resisting the latest tax cut: George Voinovich of Ohio and Olympia Snowe of Maine. He ran ads in each of their states in which he compared them with the French president, Jacques Chirac. Karl Rove, President Bush's political advisor, stated that the ads were "stupid" and "counterproductive".

=== 2005 ===
In 2005, Pat Toomey became president and the Club for Growth created a congressional scorecard. The Club's first key vote alert was an amendment sponsored by a Democrat. Representative Earl Blumenauer offered an amendment to an agricultural appropriations bill that would have reduced the sugar program by 6 percent. The Club for Growth supported the amendment, which failed, 146–280.

The Club fought to support the Dominican Republic–Central America Free Trade Agreement in 2005, running print advertisements in local Beltway publications in the Washington, DC area. According to Roll Call, "Former Rep. Pat Toomey (R-Pa.), president of the Club for Growth, a CAFTA supporter, said his group continued running advertisements before the Congressional vote."

The Club opposed the 2005 highway bill. President Bush threatened to veto the bill but did sign it. The Christian Science Monitor quoted David Keating saying, "For fiscal conservatives, it's frustrating to watch ... He's beginning to lose all credibility with these veto threats." According to The Washington Post, "The Club for Growth, a conservative group that funds like-minded candidates for Congress, has turned the highway legislation into a bumper sticker for the GOP's fiscal failings.

Keating said to the Chicago Sun-Times, "It is a pork-laden bill." The Christian Science Monitor reported Toomey saying,

"This is a defining moment. The Republican Party came to power in 1995 by advocating limited government. But in the last four to five years, there has been no evidence that the Republican officials in the federal government have any remaining commitment to this vital principle."

During the debate on the highway bill, the Club supported an amendment by Tom Coburn that would defund the noted Gravina Island Bridge, from Ketchikan to the island in Southeast Alaska.

Following the Supreme Court's Kelo v. City of New London decision, the Club gained an appropriations amendment by Scott Garrett to prohibit funds in the bill from being used to enforce the Court's decision. The amendment passed, 231–189. The Club for Growth PAC highlighted this vote when it targeted Joe Schwarz, a House Republican who it helped defeat in 2006, claiming he was too liberal.

=== 2006 ===
In the spring of 2006, the Club opposed the 527 Reform Act, which curtailed spending by such political organizations. It led a coalition of center-right groups in sending letters to Congress to support its position. The House passed the 527 Reform Act by a margin of 218–209, but the Senate did not consider the legislation.

The Club for Growth supported various amendments to cut earmarks in the budget, such as "dairy education" and a "wine initiative." The Club included assessment of sponsorship of the card check bill in its scorecard. If lawmakers co-sponsored the bill, they were docked points in the rating system.

=== 2007 ===
The Club for Growth issued a new scorecard in 2007 that highlighted how House members voted on several amendments that defunded earmarks. Sixteen congressmen scored a perfect 100% on the so-called "RePORK Card", voting for all 50 anti-pork amendments. They were all Republicans. Conversely, 105 congressmen (81 Democrats and 24 Republicans) scored a 0%, voting against every single amendment. In 2007, the Club also scored against House bills that increased the minimum wage, implemented card check, and sought caps on CEO pay. In the Senate, the Club scored against bills that increased the minimum wage, passage of the farm bill, and the SCHIP healthcare plan.

In 2007, the Club for Growth opposed protectionist policies against China. Senators Chuck Schumer of New York and Lindsey Graham of South Carolina had proposed a bill to apply large tariffs on Chinese imports if that country did not increase the value of its currency. In response, the Club sponsored a petition of 1,028 economists who stated their opposition to protectionist policies against China. The list of economists included Nobel Laureates Finn Kydland, Edward Prescott, Thomas Schelling, and Vernon Smith. The petition played off a similar petition that was also signed by 1,028 economists in 1930 that opposed the Smoot-Hawley Tariff Act.

=== 2008–09 ===
In 2008 and 2009, the Club for Growth opposed the $787 billion stimulus bill, Cash for Clunkers, cap and trade legislation, the Wall Street bailout, the auto bailout, the Affordable Care Act and the bailout of Fannie Mae and Freddie Mac.

After Barack Obama was elected president in November 2008, Club President Pat Toomey penned an op-ed that included the results of a poll commissioned by the Club: "A poll commissioned by the Club for Growth in 12 swing congressional districts over the past weekend shows that the voters who made the difference in this election still prefer less government—lower taxes, less spending and less regulation—to Obama's economic liberalism. Turns out, Americans didn't vote for Dems because they support their redistributionist agenda, but because they are fed up with the GOPers in office. This was a classic 'throw the bums out' election, rather than an embrace of the policy views of those who will replace them."

In 2009, the Club produced another "RePORK Card". This time there were 22 House members with a 100% score: 1 Democrat and 21 Republicans. At the bottom, 211 House members received a 0% score: 202 Democrats and 9 Republicans.

=== 2010 ===
The Club for Growth launched its Repeal It! campaign in 2010 in an attempt to help build public support for undoing the Affordable Care Act. In 2010, more than 400 federal lawmakers and candidates signed the Repeal It! pledge, including more than 40 of the incoming freshman class of congressmen and senators.

The Club for Growth advocated the discharge petition, a proposal that would have forced a House vote on repealing the Affordable Care Act. At the time, Keith Olbermann said: "The petition, which would need 218 signatures to force House Speaker Pelosi to put the repeal bill up for a vote, went largely ignored. As Talking Points Memo reports, on Monday it had only 30 signatures. That is until the right wing group Club For Growth e-mailed its members, explaining Mr. [Steve] King's discharge petition will be considered as a key vote on the club's annual Congressional scorecard. That scorecard is considered one of the gold standards of conservative rankings. That and the Spanish Inquisition. So by Tuesday, the petition had 22 more signatures."

=== 2011–12 ===
The Club was involved in the debate over the debt ceiling that took place in August 2011. The Club endorsed and strongly supported "Cut Cap and Balance" and ran issue ads urging Republicans to "show some spine" on maintaining the debt ceiling.

The Club opposed the re-authorization of the Export-Import Bank. The Club also took a strong position against Republicans voting for tax increases during the debate over the so-called "fiscal cliff". The Club opposed the "Plan B" tax increase proposed by John Boehner and also opposed the final deal.

=== 2013 ===
In September 2013, Club for Growth made voting on the Continuing Appropriations Resolution a key vote, announcing it track how representatives voted on the bill and make that part of their congressional scorecard. The group urged representatives to vote yes, particularly with defunding ObamaCare in mind.

The Club for Growth opposed the Ryan-Murray Budget deal. It also opposed the 2013 farm bill, which failed for the first time in the bill's 40-year history.

=== 2014 ===
The Club's PAC spent $3.1 million ($2.4 million on independent expenditures and $700,000 on ads) or nearly half of the $7.8 million which it spent in 2014 on Chris McDaniel's effort to defeat Thad Cochran in the United States Senate Republican primary election in Mississippi, 2014.

=== 2015 ===
From April through June 2015, the Club for Growth spent $1 million on television ads in nine congressional districts, urging the members of Congress in those districts to oppose re-authorization of the Export-Import Bank (Ex-Im Bank). Additional advertisements were announced in two districts in Utah, but were cancelled when the members declared their opposition to the Ex-Im Bank. In addition, the Club for Growth announced a key vote against re-authorization of the Ex-Im Bank.

The Club for Growth produced a series of policy papers on the positions taken by major Republican presidential candidates on the government's role in economic growth. The eleven papers examined the records and remarks of the candidates on issues such as tax reform, government spending, entitlement reform, and free trade. The Club concluded that Senators Ted Cruz, Rand Paul, and Marco Rubio were the most likely candidates to enact pro-growth policies if elected president.

In October 2015, the Club for Growth announced a key vote against the Bipartisan Budget Act of 2015, saying that it would include a $1.5 trillion in the debt ceiling and a $112 billion increase in federal spending.

=== Climate change ===
The Club for Growth has opposed government action to curb greenhouse gas emissions. In 2009, the Club for Growth pressured Republican politicians not to support a cap-and-trade bill, which the group viewed as being "extremely harmful to the economy." In 2011, the group issued a white paper criticizing presidential candidate Mitt Romney's regulatory record as Massachusetts governor, including his support of global warming policies. In 2017, the group called on President Trump to exit the Paris Agreement.

=== Internal Revenue Service ===
The Club for Growth opposes efforts to fund the Internal Revenue Service. In 2021, the Club for Growth said that efforts to fund the IRS were intended to aggressively pursue conservatives and that it was one of the "vicious tactics of the radical socialist left".

=== Congressional scorecard ===
Since 2005, the Club for Growth has produced an annual congressional scorecard. Each member of Congress receives a score on a scale of 0 to 100. The Club for Growth awards a Defender of Economic Freedom award to members of Congress who receive a 90% above on the annual scorecard and have a lifetime score of at least 90%. The New York Times described the Club's release of its annual scorecard as "set upon by Republicans like the Oscar nominations list by Hollywood, with everyone dying to know who ranks where, especially in election years".

The Club's 2015 congressional scorecard was based on 29 House votes and 25 Senate votes. Mike Lee was the only U.S. Senator to receive a perfect score. Ben Sasse was ranked second among U.S. Senators, followed by Marco Rubio and Ted Cruz. On the U.S. House side, John Ratcliffe, Tim Huelskamp, and Scott DesJarlais received perfect scores.

The Club for Growth Foundation's 2017 congressional scorecard was released in February 2018. Andy Biggs, a Republican from Arizona, was the only member of the U.S. House to receive a 100% rating. A total of 29 members of the U.S. House received a score of at least 90%. In the U.S. Senate, Jeff Flake, Pat Toomey, and James Lankford scored 100%, while four other senators scored at least 90%.

The Club for Growth's 2018 congressional scorecard awarded twenty members of the U.S. House and five U.S. Senators scores of at least 90%. Four U.S. Senators (Jeff Flake, Mike Lee, Rand Paul, and Pat Toomey) and three U.S. Representatives (Justin Amash, Andy Biggs, and Paul Gosar) received perfect scores. Susan Collins received the lowest score among Republican senators while Brian Fitzpatrick and Christopher Smith were the lowest scoring Republican members of the U.S. House.

== Club for Growth PAC ==
=== 2004 ===
In 2004, the Club for Growth's PAC endorsed and supported U.S. Representative Pat Toomey, who challenged incumbent Senator Arlen Specter in the Republican primary in Pennsylvania. The PAC was reported to have collected contributions totaling over $934,000 for Toomey. It also spent $1 million on its own independent television advertising campaign on Toomey's behalf. Specter, who had the support of President Bush, the RNC, and Sen. Rick Santorum, defeated Toomey by a narrow margin of 51–49%. Afterward Toomey accepted the position as President of the Club for Growth, where he served until April 2009.

=== 2006 ===
The original Club's PAC supported the electoral bids of freshmen U.S. Congressman Adrian Smith (R-NE), Doug Lamborn (R-CO), Bill Sali (R-ID), and Tim Walberg (R-MI), who all were elected. Congressional Quarterly wrote that Smith's views did not differ greatly from those of his primary election rivals, but the endorsement of the Club for Growth's PAC "gave him the imprimatur of the most fiscally conservative candidate, and it helped boost him to the top of the campaign fundraising competition."

In the 2006 primaries, the Club's PAC recommended to its donors that they support incumbent Democratic Congressman Henry Cuellar (D-TX), the first time the Club's PAC recommended support for a Democrat. Cuellar won the primary race against former Congressman Ciro Rodriguez. The Club's PAC endorsed four candidates for U.S. Senate, including Mike Bouchard in Michigan, Mike McGavick in Washington, Michael Steele in Maryland, and Stephen Laffey in Rhode Island, who did not win.

Support by the Club's PAC was not a guarantee of success: its candidate Sharron Angle was defeated in the Republican primary in Nevada's 2nd congressional district, although it spent more than $1 million on her campaign. The Club's PAC also supported primary campaigns of Phil Krinkie in Minnesota and Kevin Calvey in Oklahoma, who lost, as did incumbent congressman Chris Chocola in Indiana, John Gard in Wisconsin, and Rick O'Donnell in Colorado.

The Club's PAC supported the reelection of Steve Chabot in Ohio.

Candidate	Race	Primary	General	Outcome
Adrian Smith	Nebraska's 3rd congressional district	39%	55%	Win
Doug Lamborn	Colorado's 5th congressional district	27%	59%	Win
Bill Sali	Idaho's 1st congressional district	26%	50%	Win
Tim Walberg	Michigan's 7th congressional district	53%	50%	Win
Henry Cuellar	Texas's 28th congressional district	53%	68%	Win
Mike Bouchard	2006 United States Senate election in Michigan	60%	41%	Loss
Mike McGavick	2006 United States Senate election in Washington	86%	40%	Loss
Michael Steele	2006 United States Senate election in Maryland	87%	44%	Loss
Sharron Angle	2006 Nevada's 2nd congressional district election	35%	–	Loss
Phil Krinkie	Minnesota's 6th congressional district		–	Loss
Kevin Calvey	Oklahoma's 5th congressional district	10%	–	Loss
Chris Chocola	Indiana's 2nd congressional district	70%	46%	Loss
John Gard	Wisconsin's 8th congressional district	Unopposed	49%	Loss
Rick O'Donnell	Colorado's 7th congressional district	Unopposed	42%	Loss
Steve Chabot	Ohio's 1st congressional district	Unopposed	52%	Win
Stephen Laffey	2006 United States Senate election in Rhode Island	46%	–	Loss
Jon Kyl	United States Senate election in Arizona, 2006	Unopposed	53%	Win
George Allen	2006 United States Senate election in Virginia	Unopposed	49%	Loss
John Campbell	California's 48th congressional district	Unopposed	60%	Win
Jim Jordan	Ohio's 4th congressional district	50%	60%	Win
Ralph Norman	South Carolina's 5th congressional district	Unopposed	43%	Loss
David McSweeney	Illinois's 8th congressional district	43%	44%	Loss

=== 2007 ===
The Club's PAC endorsed state senator Steve Buehrer in the special election for Ohio's 5th congressional district to replace the deceased Rep. Paul Gillmor. Buehrer however was defeated by Bob Latta, the son of former Rep. Del Latta, in the Republican primary in November 2007 by a 44% to 40% margin.

The Club's PAC endorsed Paul Jost, the chairman of the Virginia chapter of the Club for Growth, in the contest to replace deceased Rep. Jo Ann Davis in Virginia's 1st congressional district. In the nominating convention, Jost was defeated by state delegate Rob Wittman.

=== 2008 ===
In Maryland's 1st congressional district, the Club's PAC endorsed state senator Andrew P. Harris against nine term incumbent Wayne Gilchrest. In the February 12 primary, Harris surged to a strong 44% to 32% victory. Gilchrest became the second incumbent Republican to be defeated by a candidate supported by the Club. The first was Rep. Joe Schwarz in Michigan in 2006. Harris was, however, unable to win the general election.

In Georgia's 10th congressional district, the Club's PAC endorsed incumbent Paul Broun who defeated state representative Barry Fleming 71% to 29% in the July 15, 2008, primary election. Broun's victory surprised many political observers.

In Arizona's 5th congressional district, the Club's PAC endorsed former Maricopa County Treasurer David Schweikert, who narrowly defeated former candidate Susan Bitter-Smith by a margin of 30% to 28%; there were three other candidates. He did not win the general election.

During the 2008 Republican presidential primaries, the Club's PAC was critical of Mike Huckabee, attacking him as the "tax-increasing liberal governor of Arkansas". Huckabee, in turn, referred to the Club for Growth as the "Club for Greed".

Candidate	Race	Primary	General	Outcome
Paul Broun	Georgia's 10th congressional district	71%	61%	Win
Charlie Ross	Mississippi's 3rd congressional district	43%	-	Loss
Matt Shaner	Pennsylvania's 5th congressional district	17%	-	Loss
Harri Anne Smith	Alabama's 2nd congressional district	46%	-	Loss
Bob Onder	Missouri's 9th congressional district	29%	-	Loss
Sean Parnell	Alaska's at-large congressional district	45%	-	Loss
Steve Scalise	Louisiana's 1st congressional district	58%	75%	Win
Woody Jenkins	Louisiana's 6th congressional district	61%	46%	Loss
John Shadegg	Arizona's 4th congressional district	Unopposed	54%	Win
Scott Garrett	New Jersey's 5th congressional district	Unopposed	56%	Win
Doug Lamborn	Colorado's 5th congressional district	45%	60%	Win
Michele Bachmann	Minnesota's 6th congressional district	85%	46%	Win
Pete Olson	Texas's 22nd congressional district	69%	53%	Win
Mike Coffman	Colorado's 6th congressional district	40%	61%	Win
Tom McClintock	California's 4th congressional district	53%	50%	Win
Saxby Chambliss	2008 United States Senate election in Georgia	Unopposed	58%	Win
John E. Sununu	2008 United States Senate election in New Hampshire	89%	43%	Loss
Bob Schaffer	2008 United States Senate election in Colorado	Unopposed	43%	Loss
Steve Pearce	2008 United States Senate election in New Mexico	51%	39%	Loss
Andrew P. Harris	Maryland's 1st congressional district	43%	48%	Loss
Tim Walberg	Michigan's 7th congressional district	Unopposed	46%	Loss
Tom Feeney	Florida's 24th congressional district	76%	41%	Loss
Dean Andal	California's 11th congressional district	Dean Andal	45%	Loss
David Schweikert	Arizona's 5th congressional district	30%	44%	Loss
Chris Hackett	Pennsylvania's 10th congressional district	51%	44%	Loss
Paul Jost	Virginia's 1st congressional district			Loss
Steve Buehrer	Ohio's 5th congressional district	40%	-	Loss

=== 2009 ===
The Club's PAC endorsed in the special election in New York's 23rd congressional district the Conservative Party of New York candidate, Doug Hoffman instead of Republican candidate Dede Scozzafava. With the Club pouring money into Hoffman's campaign, Scozzafava realized that she could not win and withdrew from the race the Sunday before the November 3 special election, endorsing the Democratic candidate Bill Owens. Owens won the election in a district where portions had not had a Democratic congressman since the 19th century.

=== 2010 ===
Of the 26 general election candidates endorsed by Club for Growth in 2010, 20 won election. The following chart lists candidates endorsed by the Club:

Candidate	Race	Primary	General	Outcome
David Schweikert	Arizona's 5th congressional district	37%	52%	Win
Tom Coburn	United States Senate election in Oklahoma, 2010	90%	71%	Win
Tom Graves	Georgia's 9th congressional district	55%	Unopposed	Win
Mike Lee	2010 United States Senate election in Utah	51%	62%	Win
Ron Johnson	2010 United States Senate election in Wisconsin	85%	52%	Win
Sharron Angle	2010 United States Senate election in Nevada	40%	45%	Loss
Rand Paul	2010 United States Senate election in Kentucky	59%	56%	Win
Marco Rubio	2010 United States Senate election in Florida	84%	48%	Win
Ken Buck	2010 United States Senate election in Colorado	52%	46%	Loss
Joe Miller	2010 United States Senate election in Alaska	51%	35%	Loss
Pat Toomey	2010 United States Senate election in Pennsylvania	82%	51%	Win
Tim Huelskamp	Kansas's 1st congressional district	34%	74%	Win
Mike Pompeo	Kansas's 4th congressional district	39%	59%	Win
Jeff Duncan	South Carolina's 3rd congressional district	51%	62%	Win
Tim Scott	South Carolina's 1st congressional district	68%	65%	Win
Justin Amash	Michigan's 3rd congressional district	40%	60%	Win
Mick Mulvaney	South Carolina's 5th congressional district	Unopposed	55%	Win
Todd Young	Indiana's 9th congressional district	34%	52%	Win
Stephen Fincher	Tennessee's 8th congressional district	48%	59%	Win
Tim Griffin	Arkansas's 2nd congressional district	61%	58%	Win
David Harmer	California's 11th congressional district	36%	48%	Loss
Jesse Kelly	Arizona's 8th congressional district	48%	47%	Loss
Nan Hayworth	New York's 19th congressional district	69%	53%	Win
Keith Rothfus	Pennsylvania's 4th congressional district	66%	49%	Loss
Andrew P. Harris	Maryland's 1st congressional district	67%	55%	Win
Jim DeMint	United States Senate election in South Carolina, 2010	83%	62%	Win
Doug Hoffman	New York's 23rd congressional district		46%	Loss
Kevin Calvey	Oklahoma's 5th congressional district	34%	-	Loss
Robin Smith	Tennessee's 3rd congressional district	28%	-	Loss

=== 2012 ===
In 2012, the Club for Growth PAC endorsed eighteen congressional candidates, nine of whom won their elections:

Candidate	Race	Primary	General	Outcome
Richard Mourdock	United States Senate election in Indiana, 2012	61%	44%	Loss
Josh Mandel	United States Senate election in Ohio, 2012	63%	45%	Loss
Connie Mack IV	United States Senate election in Florida, 2012	59%	42%	Loss
Ted Cruz	United States Senate election in Texas, 2012	57%	56%	Win
Jeff Flake	United States Senate election in Arizona, 2012	69%	49%	Win
Thomas Massie	Kentucky's 4th congressional district	45%	62%	Win
Steve King	Iowa's 4th congressional district	Unopposed	52%	Win
Ron DeSantis	Florida's 6th congressional district	38%	57%	Win
Kevin Cramer	North Dakota's at-large congressional district	54%	54%	Win
Tom Cotton	Arkansas's 4th congressional district	57%	59%	Win
Mark Neumann	United States Senate election in Wisconsin, 2012	22%	-	Loss
Carl Wimmer	Utah's 4th congressional district		–	Loss
Don Stenberg	United States Senate election in Nebraska, 2012	18%	-	Loss
Matt Salmon	Arizona's 5th congressional district	51%	64%	Win
Scott Keadle	North Carolina's 8th congressional district	36%	–	Loss
David M. McIntosh	Indiana's 5th congressional district	28%	–	Loss
Ron Gould	Arizona's 4th congressional district	31%	–	Loss
Keith Rothfus	Pennsylvania's 12th congressional district	Unopposed	52%	Win

=== 2014 ===
Candidate	Race	Primary	Runoff	General	Outcome
Justin Amash	Michigan's 3rd congressional district	Win	–	Win	Win
Ben Sasse	United States Senate election in Nebraska, 2014	Win	–	Win	Win
Chris McDaniel	United States Senate election in Mississippi, 2014	Went to runoff election	Loss	–	Loss
Tom Cotton	United States Senate election in Arkansas, 2014	Unopposed	–	Win	Win
Bryan Smith	Idaho's 2nd congressional district	Loss	–	–	Loss
Dan Sullivan	United States Senate election in Alaska, 2014	Win	–	Win	Win
John Ratcliffe	Texas's 4th congressional district	Went to runoff election	Win	Win	Win
Chad Mathis	Alabama's 6th congressional district	Loss	–	–	Loss
Barry Loudermilk	Georgia's 11th congressional district	Went to runoff election	Win	Win	Win
Bob Johnson	Georgia's 1st congressional district	Went to runoff election	Loss	–	Loss
Mike Pompeo	Kansas's 4th congressional district	Win	–	Win	Win
Gary Palmer	Alabama's 6th congressional district	Went to runoff election	Win	Win	Win
Marilinda Garcia	New Hampshire's 2nd congressional district	Win	–	Loss	Loss

=== 2016 ===
==== U.S. presidential election ====
With regard to the 2016 Republican presidential primary candidates, the Club for Growth was critical of Mike Huckabee, Chris Christie, John Kasich, Ben Carson, Carly Fiorina, and Donald Trump. In August 2015, Club for Growth President David McIntosh said that Marco Rubio, Rand Paul, and Ted Cruz are "the real deal candidates, the gold standard of the race," and that while questions remained, Jeb Bush and Scott Walker showed some pro-growth stances.

In August 2015, the Club for Growth PAC announced it would formally support presidential candidates for the first time, saying the group would bundle donations for Cruz, Rubio, Walker, Bush, and Paul. Club for Growth President David McIntosh said "Five candidates are at the forefront of the Republican presidential field on issues of economic freedom, and the Club for Growth PAC is standing with them to help them stand out from the rest." In October 2015, McIntosh said Cruz and Rubio were "the gold standard" of Republican presidential candidates.

The Club for Growth's Super PAC, Club for Growth Action, was particularly critical of Trump's candidacy, announcing a $1 million Iowa advertising buy against his campaign in September 2015. The Club for Growth Action was the first third-party group to spend significant sums against Donald Trump. The Club for Growth announced a $1.5 million advertising buy in Florida in March 2016. The group's advertisements highlighted Trump's support for liberal policies, such as a single-payer health insurance system and tax increases.

In March 2016, Politico reported that the Club for Growth PAC planned to deny congressional endorsements to any candidates who endorsed Donald Trump's presidential bid before the nomination was actually clinched. The Club's PAC noted that the warning did not apply to those who endorsed Trump after the May 3, 2016, Indiana primary. Also in March 2016, the Club for Growth PAC endorsed Ted Cruz for president. The Club for Growth PAC had never previously endorsed in a presidential race. According to Club for Growth head David McIntosh, "This year is different because there is a vast gulf between the two leading Republican candidates on matters of economic liberty. Their records make clear that Ted Cruz is a consistent conservative who will fight to shrink the federal footprint, while Donald Trump would seek to remake government in his desired image."

==== U.S. congressional elections ====
In North Carolina's 2nd congressional district, Club for Growth Action opposed incumbent Renee Ellmers without endorsing a specific candidate. She was defeated in the primary.

Candidate	Race	Primary	Primary runoff	General	General runoff	Outcome
Ron Johnson	United States Senate election in Wisconsin, 2016	Win	—	Win	—	Win
Mike Lee	United States Senate election in Utah, 2016	Win	—	Win	—	Win
Rand Paul	United States Senate election in Kentucky, 2016	Win	—	Win	—	Win
Tim Scott	United States Senate election in South Carolina, 2016	Win	—	Win	—	Win
Pat Toomey	United States Senate election in Pennsylvania, 2016	Win	—	Win	—	Win
Marco Rubio	United States Senate election in Florida, 2016	Win	—	Win	—	Win
Ron DeSantis	Florida's 6th congressional district	Win	—	Win	—	Win
Marlin Stutzman	United States Senate election in Indiana, 2016	Loss	—	—	—	Loss
Warren Davidson	Ohio's 8th congressional district	Win	—	Win	—	Win
Jim Banks	Indiana's 3rd congressional district	Win	—	Win	—	Win
Kyle McCarter	Illinois's 15th congressional district	Loss	—	—	—	Loss
Mary Thomas	Florida's 2nd congressional district	Loss	—	—	—	Loss
John Fleming	United States Senate election in Louisiana, 2016	Loss	—	—	—	Loss
Mike Crane	Georgia's 3rd congressional district	Went to runoff election	Loss	—	—	Loss
Ted Budd	North Carolina's 13th congressional district	Win	—	Win	—	Win
Rod Blum	Iowa's 1st congressional district	Win	—	Win	—	Win
Scott Garrett	New Jersey's 5th congressional district	Win	—	Loss	—	Loss
Tim Huelskamp	Kansas's 1st congressional district	Loss	—	—	—	Loss
Andy Biggs	Arizona's 5th congressional district	Win	—	Win	—	Win
Paul Gosar	Arizona's 4th congressional district	Win	—	Win	—	Win
Mike Johnson	Louisiana's 4th congressional district	—	—	Went to runoff	Win	Win

=== 2017 ===
The Club for Growth endorsed Bob Gray to represent Tom Price's district after he left to lead the United States Department of Health and Human Services. The group reportedly also bought $250,000 of airtime on Atlanta cable against early Republican front-runner Karen Handel. The special election took place on April 18, 2017, with Republican Karen Handel defeating Gray and winning a runoff election on June 20, 2017, against Democrat Jon Ossoff.

The organization endorsed Ralph Norman in the Republican primary to replace Mick Mulvaney in South Carolina's 5th congressional district. Norman won the primary and went on to defeat Archie Parnell in the general election. The organization also endorsed Christopher Herrod's candidacy in the special election to replace Jason Chaffetz.

=== 2018 ===
The Club for Growth PAC endorsed Ohio State Treasurer Josh Mandel in his bid to unseat incumbent Democratic Senator Sherrod Brown in the 2018 United States Senate election in Ohio. Mandel dropped out of the race in January 2018.

Candidate	Race	Primary	Primary runoff	General
Matt Rosendale	United States Senate election in Montana, 2018	Win	—	Loss
Van Taylor	Texas's 3rd congressional district	Win	—	Win
Kevin Nicholson	United States Senate election in Wisconsin, 2018	Loss	—	—
Marsha Blackburn	United States Senate election in Tennessee, 2018	Win	—	Win
Mark Green	Tennessee's 7th congressional district	Uncontested	—	Win
Josh Hawley	United States Senate election in Missouri, 2018	Win	—	Win
Denver Riggleman	Virginia's 5th congressional district	Win	—	Win
Russ Fulcher	Idaho's 1st congressional district	Win	—	Win
Chip Roy	Texas's 21st congressional district	Went to runoff election	Win	Win
Rick Saccone	Pennsylvania's 18th congressional district	Win	—	Loss
Dino Rossi	Washington's 8th congressional district	Win	—	Loss
Ron Wright	Texas's 6th congressional district	Went to runoff election	Win	Win
Andy Coleman	Oklahoma's 1st congressional district	Loss	—	—
Mark Harris	North Carolina's 9th congressional district	Win	—	New election called (see 2019 North Carolina's 9th congressional district special election)
Michael Cloud	Texas's 27th congressional district	Went to runoff election	Win	Win
Scott Perry	Pennsylvania's 10th congressional district	Uncontested	—	Win
Ted Budd	North Carolina's 13th congressional district	Uncontested	—	Win
Bunni Pounds	Texas's 5th congressional district	Went to runoff election	Loss	—
Greg Steube	Florida's 17th congressional district	Win	—	Win
Josh Kimbrell	South Carolina's 4th congressional district	Loss	—	—
Lee Bright	South Carolina's 4th congressional district	Went to runoff election	Loss	—
Ted Cruz	United States Senate election in Texas, 2018	Win	—	Win
Rick Scott	United States Senate election in Florida, 2018	Win	—	Win
Dave Brat	Virginia's 7th congressional district	Win	—	Loss
Ross Spano	Florida's 15th congressional district	Win	—	Win
Steve Chabot	Ohio's 1st congressional district	Win	—	Win

=== 2019 ===
In the 2019 special election in North Carolina's 9th congressional district, the Club for Growth endorsed state senator Dan Bishop in the 10-candidate Republican primary field. Bishop advanced from the primary and defeated Democrat Dan McCready in the general special election on September 10, 2019.

In the 2019 special election in Pennsylvania's 12th congressional district, the Club for Growth endorsed Fred Keller, who advanced to the general election. Keller won the general special election held on May 21, 2019.

In the 2019 special election in North Carolina's 3rd congressional district, the Club for Growth endorsed Celeste Cairns in the 17-person Republican primary field. Cairns did not advance to the runoff primary.

=== 2020 ===
Club for Growth supported the re-election campaign of President Donald Trump, who lost to Joe Biden.

Candidate	Race	Primary	Primary runoff	General
Ben Sasse	2020 United States Senate election in Nebraska	Win	—	Win
Chip Roy	Texas's 21st congressional district	Uncontested	—	Win
Scott Perry	Pennsylvania's 10th congressional district	Uncontested	—	Win
Ted Budd	North Carolina's 13th congressional district	Uncontested	—	Win
Steve Chabot	Ohio's 1st congressional district	Uncontested	—	Win
David Schweikert	Arizona's 6th congressional district	Uncontested	—	Win
Matt Rosendale	Montana's at-large congressional district	Win	—	Win
Bill Hightower	Alabama's 1st congressional district	Advanced to runoff	Loss	—
Nancy Mace	South Carolina's 1st congressional district	Win	—	Win
Nick Freitas	Virginia's 7th congressional district	Win	—	Loss
Eric Brakey	Maine's 2nd congressional district	Loss	—	—
Jeanne Ives	Illinois's 6th congressional district	Win	—	Loss
Cynthia Lummis	2020 United States Senate election in Wyoming	Win	—	Win
Chris Ekstrom	Texas's 13th congressional district	Loss	—	—
Thomas Massie	Kentucky's 4th congressional district	Win	—	Win
Chris Putnam	Texas's 12th congressional district	Loss	—	—
Tom Tiffany	Wisconsin's 7th congressional district	Win	—	Win
Rich McCormick	Georgia's 7th congressional district	Win	—	Loss
Tommy Tuberville	2020 United States Senate election in Alabama	Advanced to runoff	Win	Win
Barry Moore	Alabama's 2nd congressional district	Advanced to runoff	Win	Win
Victoria Spartz	Indiana's 5th congressional district	Win	—	Win
Steve Daines	2020 United States Senate election in Montana	Win	—	Win
Mike Garcia	California's 25th congressional district	Win	—	Win
Matt Gurtler	Georgia's 9th congressional district	Advanced to runoff	Loss	—
Ronny Jackson	Texas's 13th congressional district	Advanced to runoff	Win	Win
Shane Hernandez	Michigan's 10th congressional district	Loss	—	—
Ross Spano	Florida's 15th congressional district	Loss	—	—
Byron Donalds	Florida's 19th congressional district	Win	—	Win
Timothy Hill	Tennessee's 1st congressional district	Loss	—	—

=== 2022 ===
On April 9, Donald Trump and David McIntosh appeared together onstage during a rally in North Carolina. Trump praised McIntosh, stating, "He's a winner. He's a fighter. We are undefeated when we work together." McIntosh responded, "You are a great man...I am so proud to partner with you."

On April 15, Donald Trump officially endorsed JD Vance for the 2022 United States Senate election in Ohio. After this endorsement, the Club for Growth continued their negative ad campaign against Vance, and doubled down on April 27 with an ad attacking Vance for negative statements he made about Trump in 2016. According to The New York Times reporter Maggie Haberman, Trump reacted to this advertisement by having an assistant send a three word message to McIntosh, "Go f*** yourself."

Candidate	Race	Primary	Primary Runoff	General
Ron DeSantis	2022 Florida gubernatorial election	Win	—	Win
Josh Mandel	2022 United States Senate election in Ohio	Loss	—	—
Mo Brooks	2022 United States Senate election in Alabama	Advanced to runoff	Loss	—
Kathy Barnette	2022 United States Senate election in Pennsylvania	Loss	—	—
Ted Budd	2022 United States Senate election in North Carolina	Win	—	Win
Blake Masters	2022 United States Senate election in Arizona	Win	—	Loss
Adam Laxalt	2022 United States Senate election in Nevada	Win	—	Loss
Mike Lee	2022 United States Senate election in Utah	Win	—	Win
Rand Paul	2022 United States Senate election in Kentucky	Win	—	Win
Harriet Hageman	Wyoming's at-large congressional district	Win	—	Win
Anna Paulina Luna	Florida's 13th congressional district	Win	—	Win
Mary Miller (politician)	Illinois's 15th congressional district	Win	—	Win
Alex Mooney	West Virginia's 2nd congressional district	Win	—	Win
Greg Steube	Florida's 17th congressional district	Win	—	Win
Scott Baugh	California's 47th congressional district	Advanced to runoff	—	Loss
Dan Bishop	North Carolina's 8th congressional district	Win	—	Win
Josh Brecheen	Oklahoma's 2nd congressional district	Advanced to runoff	Win	Win
Yesli Vega	Virginia's 7th congressional district	Win	—	Loss
Eric Burlison	Missouri's 7th congressional district	Win	—	Win
Bo Hines	North Carolina's 13th congressional district	Win	—	Loss
Barry Moore (American politician)	Alabama's 2nd congressional district	Win	—	Win
Andy Ogles	Tennessee's 5th congressional district	Win	—	Win
Chip Roy	Texas's 21st congressional district	Win	—	Win
David Schweikert	Arizona's 1st congressional district	Win	—	Win
Catalina Lauf	Illinois's 11th congressional district	Win	—	Loss
Rich McCormick	Georgia's 6th congressional district	Advanced to runoff	Win	Win
Max Miller	Ohio's 7th congressional district	Win	—	Win

=== 2024 ===
Candidates endorsed by the Club for Growth in the 2024 election cycle are listed below.

Candidate	Race	Primary	Primary Runoff	General
Jim Banks	2024 United States Senate election in Indiana	Win	—	Win
Ted Cruz	2024 United States Senate election in Texas	Win	—	Win
Rick Scott	2024 United States Senate election in Florida	Win	—	Win
Bernie Moreno	2024 United States Senate election in Ohio	Win	—	Win
Kari Lake	2024 United States Senate election in Arizona	Win	—	Loss
Scott Baugh	California's 47th congressional district	Win	—	Loss
Eli Crane	Arizona's 2nd congressional district	Win	—	Win
Brandon Gill	Texas's 26th congressional district	Win	—	Win
Brian Jack	Georgia's 3rd congressional district	Win	—	Win
Nancy Mace	South Carolina's 1st congressional district	Win	—	Win
Derek Merrin	Ohio's 9th congressional district	Win	—	Loss
Barry Moore	Alabama's 1st congressional district	Win	—	Win
Bob Onder	Missouri's 3rd congressional district	Win	—	Win
Scott Perry	Pennsylvania's 10th congressional district	Win	—	Win
David Schweikert	Arizona's 1st congressional district	Win	—	Win
Marlin Stutzman	Indiana's 3rd congressional district	Win	—	Win
Mike Braun	2024 Indiana gubernatorial election	Win	—	Win
Patrick Morrisey	2024 West Virginia gubernatorial election	Win	—	Win
Dan Bishop	2024 North Carolina Attorney General election	Uncontested	—	Loss
