= List of presidential trips made by George W. Bush (2006) =

This is a list of presidential trips made by George W. Bush during 2006, the sixth year of his presidency as the 43rd president of the United States. International trips are highlighted in blue.

This list excludes trips made within Washington, D.C., the U.S. federal capital in which the White House, the official residence and principal workplace of the president, is located. It also excludes the capital's immediate surroundings in Maryland and Virginia, such as Andrews Air Force Base in Maryland, where the president typically boards Air Force One for all trips outside the area. Also excluded are trips to Camp David, the country residence of the president, and to the Bush family's Prairie Chapel Ranch near Crawford and Walker's Point Estate in Kennebunkport, Maine.

== January ==
State or country	Areas visited	Dates	Details
Texas	San Antonio	January 1	Visited wounded soldiers at Brooke Army Medical Center during stopover on return from Christmas vacation.
Illinois	Chicago	January 6	Toured Chicago Board of Trade. Addressed the Economic Club of Chicago at the Chicago Hilton.
Kentucky	Louisville	January 11	Took questions at the Kentucky International Convention Center.
Louisiana	New Orleans	January 12	Toured recovery efforts from Hurricane Katrina.
Mississippi	Bay St. Louis, Waveland	January 12	Toured recovery efforts from Hurricane Katrina at Saint Stanislaus College.
Florida	Palm Beach	January 12	Attended a Republican National Committee reception.
Kansas	Topeka, Manhattan	January 23	Delivered the 2006 Landon Lecture at Kansas State University.

== February ==
State or country	Areas visited	Dates	Details
Tennessee	Nashville	February 1	Spoke at the Grand Ole Opry House.
Minnesota	Maplewood	February 2	Spoke at 3M headquarters.
New Mexico	Albuquerque, Rio Rancho	February 3	Spoke at an Intel fabrication plant.
Texas	Dallas	February 3	Visited the School of Science and Engineering.
Georgia	Lithonia	February 7	Attended the funeral of Coretta Scott King at New Birth Missionary Baptist Church.
New Hampshire	Manchester	February 8	Addressed the Business and Industry Association of New Hampshire at the Radisson Hotel Manchester-Center.
Maryland	Cambridge	February 10	Attended the House Republican Conference retreat at the Hyatt Regency Chesapeake Bay.
Ohio	Columbus, Dublin	February 15	Discussed health care policy at Wendy's International headquarters.
Florida	Tampa, Orlando, Lake Buena Vista	February 17	Spoke at the Port of Tampa. Attended a Republican Party of Florida dinner at Disney's Contemporary Resort.
Wisconsin	Milwaukee	February 20	Discussed energy policy after touring Johnson Controls Battery Technology Center.
Michigan	Auburn Hills	February 20	Toured a local business, United Solar Ovonic.
Colorado	Aurora, Englewood, Golden	February 21	Toured the National Renewable Energy Laboratory.
Indiana	Mishawaka	February 23	Visited Bethel College. Campaigned for Chris Chocola for Congressional election.
Ireland	Shannon	February 28	Met with U.S. Marines who were en route to Iraq.

== March ==
State or country	Areas visited	Dates	Details
Afghanistan	Bagram, Kabul	March 1	Met with President Hamid Karzai. Dedicated new U.S. Embassy. Addressed U.S. military personnel.
India	New Delhi, Hyderabad	March 1–3	Met with Prime Minister Manmohan Singh. Signed U.S.-India Civil Nuclear Agreement.
Pakistan	Islamabad	March 3–4	Met with President Pervez Musharraf.
Louisiana	New Orleans	March 8	Toured recovery efforts after Hurricane Katrina.
Mississippi	Gautier	March 8	Visited College Park Elementary School. Toured recovery efforts after Hurricane Katrina.
Georgia	College Park	March 9	Attended Georgia Republican Party President's Day dinner at the Georgia International Convention Center.
New York	Rochester; Canandaigua	March 14	Met Jason McElwain at Greater Rochester International Airport. Discussed Medicare policy at Canandaigua Academy. Toured Ferris Hills at West Lake Senior Center.
Ohio	Cleveland	March 20	Took questions with the City Club of Cleveland at the Renaissance Cleveland Hotel.
West Virginia	Wheeling	March 22	Took questions at the Capitol Music Hall.
Indiana	Indianapolis	March 24	Campaigned for Michael E. Sodrel in Congressional election.
Pennsylvania	Pittsburgh, Sewickley Heights	March 24	Attended a fundraising reception for Rick Santorum's Senate campaign.
Mexico	Cancún, Chichen-Itza	March 30–31	Attended the 2nd North American Leaders' Summit with Mexican president Vicente Fox and Canadian prime minister Stephen Harper; visited the Chichen-Itza archaeological site.

== April ==
State or country	Areas visited	Dates	Details
Ohio	Cincinnati	April 3	Met parents of Keith Maupin, then missing in action in Iraq. Threw the first pitch on Opening Day at Great American Ball Park.
Connecticut	Bridgeport	April 5	Took questions on health care reform at the Playhouse on the Green.
North Carolina	Charlotte	April 6	Took questions at Central Piedmont Community College.
Missouri	Columbia, Jefferson City	April 11	Visited Lutheran Senior Services at Heisinger Bluffs retirement community.
Iowa	Des Moines	April 11	Visited Wesley Acres retirement community.
Alabama	Tuskegee	April 19	Visited Tuskegee University, viewing a demonstration of nanotechnology research.
California	San Jose, Stanford, Sacramento, West Sacramento, Palm Springs, Indian Wells, Rancho Mirage, Twentynine Palms, Irvine	April 21–24	Flew into Moffett Federal Airfield. Toured Cisco Systems headquarters. Met Hoover Institution fellows at Stanford University. Bicycled through Las Posadas State Forest to mark Earth Day. Toured the California Fuel Cell Partnership. Attended a Republican National Committee reception at Toscana Country Club. Visited former president Gerald Ford at his home. Toured Marine Corps Air Ground Combat Center Twentynine Palms. Took questions at the Hyatt Regency Irvine.
Nevada	Las Vegas	April 24	Campaigned for Jon Porter in Congressional election at The Venetian Las Vegas.
Louisiana	New Orleans	April 27	Toured recovery efforts after Hurricane Katrina.
Mississippi	Biloxi	April 27	Toured recovery efforts after Hurricane Katrina.

== May ==
State or country	Areas visited	Dates	Details
Oklahoma	Stillwater	May 6	Gave the commencement address at Oklahoma State University.
Florida	Fort Lauderdale, Coconut Creek, Tampa, Sun City Center, Orlando	May 8–10	Attended a fundraising reception for Clay Shaw's Congressional campaign. Visited the Broward Community College campus. Took questions on Medicare policy at the Kings Point Clubhouse. Visited Sun City Center Fire Station No. 28 during drought conditions. Took questions at Asociación Borinqueña de Florida Central.
Mississippi	Biloxi	May 11	Gave the commencement address at Mississippi Gulf Coast Community College.
Arizona	Yuma	May 18	Visited Mexico–United States border, touring United States Border Patrol sector headquarters. Greeted military personnel at Marine Corps Air Station Yuma.
Virginia	Virginia Beach	May 19	Attended a fundraising reception for Thelma Drake's Congressional campaign.
Kentucky	Highland Heights, Florence	May 19	Spoke at Northern Kentucky University. Spoke at a fundraising reception for Geoff Davis' Congressional campaign at the Hilton Greater Cincinnati Airport.
Illinois	Chicago	May 22	Took questions at the Arie Crown Theater.
Pennsylvania	Pottstown, Philadelphia	May 24	Toured the Limerick Generating Station. Visited the Saratoga Court Elder Care Center. Attended a reception for the Pennsylvania Congressional Victory Committee at the Sheraton Philadelphia City Center.
New York	Newburgh, West Point	May 27	Delivered the commencement address at the United States Military Academy's Michie Stadium.
Maryland	Baltimore	May 31	Campaigned for gubernatorial candidate Bob Ehrlich at the BWI Airport Marriott.

== June ==
State or country	Areas visited	Dates	Details
New Mexico	Artesia	June 6	Toured the Federal Law Enforcement Training Center. Swore in W. Ralph Basham as U.S. Customs and Border Protection commissioner.
Texas	Laredo	June 6	Toured Border Patrol sector headquarters. Visited Mary Help of Christians School and a local business, Cotulla Style Pit Bar-B-Que.
Nebraska	Omaha	June 6–7	Spoke on immigration reform at the Metropolitan Community College South Omaha Campus.
Iraq	Baghdad	June 13	Met with Prime Minister Nouri al-Maliki. Addressed U.S. military personnel.
Washington	Medina, Washington	June 16	Attended a fundraising reception for Dave Reichert at a private residence.
New Mexico	Albuquerque	June 16	Campaigned for Heather Wilson for Congress at the Hyatt Regency Albuquerque.
New York	Kings Point	June 19	Gave the commencement address at the United States Merchant Marine Academy.
Austria	Vienna	June 20–21	Attended the U.S.-EU Summit Meeting.
Hungary	Budapest	June 21–22	Met with President László Sólyom and Prime Minister Ferenc Gyurcsány. Attended the 50th anniversary of the Hungarian Uprising.
Missouri	St. Louis	June 28	Visited a local Veterans of Foreign Wars post. Campaigned for Jim Talent in Senate election.
Tennessee	Memphis	June 30	Toured Graceland and visited a local restaurant, The Rendezvous, with Japanese prime minister Junichiro Koizumi.
Ohio	Columbus	June 30	Attended a fundraising reception for Mike DeWine's Senate campaign at a private residence.

== July ==
State or country	Areas visited	Dates	Details
North Carolina	Fort Bragg	July 4	Toured United States Army Special Operations Command and celebrated Independence Day.
Illinois	Chicago, Aurora	July 6–7	Visited the Chicago Firehouse Restaurant with Mayor Richard M. Daley. Campaigned for Judy Baar Topinka in gubernatorial election at the Drake Hotel. Toured Cabot Microelectronics facility.
Wisconsin	Port Washington, Milwaukee	July 11	Toured Allen Edmonds headquarters. Campaigned for Mark Green in gubernatorial election at the Hilton Milwaukee.
Germany	Stralsund, Trinwillershagen	July 12–14	Met with Chancellor Angela Merkel.
Russia	St. Petersburg	July 14–17	Attended the 32nd G8 summit. Met with Chinese President Hu Jintao, Brazilian President Luiz Inácio Lula da Silva and Indian Prime Minister Manmohan Singh.
Colorado	Aurora, Englewood	July 21	Visited a local business, Tamale Fiesta Kitchen. Campaigned for Rick O'Donnell for Congress at a private residence.
Virginia	Fort Belvoir	July 26	Hosted Iraqi prime minister Nouri al-Maliki.
West Virginia	Charleston	July 26	Campaigned for Shelley Moore Capito for Congress at a private residence.
Florida	Miami, Miami Beach, Coral Gables	July 30–31	Gave an interview on Radio Mambí at a local business, Versailles Restaurant and Bakery. Toured the Port of Miami, National Hurricane Center headquarters and a Coast Guard Integrated Support Command center. Attended a Republican National Committee luncheon at a private residence.

== August ==
State or country	Areas visited	Dates	Details
Ohio	Mentor, Kirtland Hills	August 2	Toured the Lake County Emergency Management Agency, in the wake of a major flood. Campaigned for Ken Blackwell for gubernatorial election.
Texas	McAllen, Mission	August 3	Toured Border Patrol and Texas National Guard facilities, viewing a demonstration of a Skybox, en route to his ranch in Texas.
Wisconsin	Green Bay, Oneida	August 10	Toured a local business, Fox Valley Metal-Tech, Inc. Campaigned for John Gard for Congress at a private residence.
Pennsylvania	York, Lancaster	August 16	Toured a Harley-Davidson Vehicle Operations facility, where he gave an interview to USA Today. Campaigned for Lynn Swann in gubernatorial election.
Minnesota	Minneapolis, Minnetonka, Wayzata	August 22	Signed Executive Order 13410 at the Minneapolis Marriott Southwest. Visited a local business, Glaciers Custard and Coffee Cafe. Campaigned for Michele Bachmann for Congress at a private residence.
Maine	Kennebunk	August 24	Met family members of soldiers killed in action and of September 11 attacks victims, en route to Bush family compound.
Mississippi	Biloxi, Gulfport	August 28	Toured recovery efforts from Hurricane Katrina on its first anniversary. Visited the Biloxi Schooner Restaurant with Governor Haley Barbour.
Louisiana	New Orleans	August 28–29	Toured recovery efforts from Hurricane Katrina on its first anniversary. Visited Warren Easton Charter High School.
Arkansas	Little Rock	August 30	Visited Cotham's Mercantile Store. Attended a fundraising luncheon for Asa Hutchinson's gubernatorial campaign.
Tennessee	Nashville	August 30	Campaigned for Bob Corker in Senate election at the Loews Vanderbilt Hotel.
Utah	Salt Lake City	August 30	Addressed the American Legion National Convention at the Salt Palace. Campaigned for Orrin Hatch in Senate election at the Grand America Hotel.

== September ==
State or country	Areas visited	Dates	Details
Maryland	Piney Point	September 4	Observed Labor Day at the Paul Hall Center for Maritime Training and Education.
Georgia	Atlanta, Marietta; Savannah; Pooler	September 7	Spoke to the Georgia Public Policy Foundation at the Cobb Galleria Centre. Campaigned for Max Burns in Congressional election at the Mighty Eighth Air Force Museum.
Michigan	Flint, Clarkston	September 8	Attended a fundraising reception for Mike Bouchard's Senate campaign.
Missouri	Kansas City	September 8	Campaigned for Jim Talent in Senate election.
New York	New York	September 10–11	Attended ceremonies marking the fifth anniversary of the September 11 attacks, at the World Trade Center site, St. Paul's Chapel, the newly opened Tribute WTC Visitor Center, and Fort Pitt Firehouse.
Pennsylvania	Shanksville	September 11	Attended a ceremony marking the fifth anniversary of the September 11 attacks at the crash site of United Airlines Flight 93.
New York	New York	September 18–20	Stayed at the Waldorf-Astoria Hotel. Hosted a meeting of the White House Conference on Global Literacy at the New York Public Library Main Branch. Attended the opening of the 61st United Nations General Assembly.
Florida	Tampa, Orlando	September 21	Visited Tampa Bay Buccaneers training facility. Campaigned for Gus Bilirakis in Congressional election at Raymond James Stadium, and for Charlie Crist in gubernatorial election at the Ritz-Carlton Orlando.
New York	New York	September 25	
Connecticut	Riverside	September 25	Attended a Connecticut Republican Party luncheon.
Ohio	Cincinnati	September 25	Toured a local business, Meyer Tool, Inc. Attended a fundraising reception for Mike DeWine's Senate campaign at a private residence.
Tennessee	Memphis	September 27	Attended a fundraising luncheon for Bob Corker's Senate campaign.
Alabama	Hoover, Birmingham	September 28	Spoke about energy policy at the Hoover Public Safety Center. Campaigned for Bob Riley in gubernatorial election at the Birmingham–Jefferson Convention Complex.
Ohio	Columbus, New Albany	September 28	Attended a fundraising reception for Deborah Pryce's Congressional campaign.

== October ==
State or country	Areas visited	Dates	Details
Nevada	Reno	October 2	Campaigned for Dean Heller in Congressional election at the Mercury Air Center.
California	Stockton, El Dorado Hills, Los Angeles	October 2–3	Signed the Partners for Fish and Wildlife Act. Toured George W. Bush Elementary School. Campaigned for Congressional candidates Richard Pombo at the Stockton Memorial Civic Auditorium and John Doolittle at the Serrano Country Club.
Arizona	Phoenix, Scottsdale	October 3–4	Campaigned for Rick Renzi in Congressional election at the Camelback Inn.
Colorado	Denver, Englewood	October 4	Campaigned for Bob Beauprez in gubernatorial election at the Inverness Hotel and Conference Center.
Virginia	Newport News	October 7	Attended the christening ceremony for the USS George H. W. Bush at the Northrop Grumman shipyard.
Georgia	Robins Air Force Base, Macon	October 10	Campaigned for Mac Collins in Congressional election at the Macon Coliseum.
Missouri	St. Louis	October 12	Attended the National Renewable Energy Conference at the St. Louis Convention Center.
Illinois	Chicago	October 12	Campaigned for Congressional candidates Peter Roskam and David McSweeney at the Hilton Chicago.
North Carolina	Greensboro, Randleman	October 18	Met community leaders at Stamey's restaurant. Toured Waldo C. Falkener Elementary School and Victory Junction Gang Camp.
Pennsylvania	Avoca, La Plume, Clarks Summit	October 19	Campaigned for Don Sherwood in Congressional election at Keystone College. Visited a local business, Manning's Ice Cream and Milk.
Virginia	Richmond	October 19	Campaigned for George Allen in Senate election at the Science Museum of Virginia.
Florida	Sarasota, Fort Lauderdale, Boca Raton	October 24	Campaigned for Vern Buchanan in Congressional election at the Sarasota Bradenton International Convention Center. Toured Gyrocam Systems headquarters.
Iowa	Des Moines	October 26	Campaigned for Jeff Lamberti in Congressional election at the Iowa State Fairgrounds.
Michigan	Clinton Township, Warren	October 26	Visited a local business, Morley Candy Makers. Campaigned for Mike Bouchard in Senate election at the Mabry Banquet and Convention Center.
Indiana	Sellersburg	October 28	Campaigned for Mike Sodrel in Congressional election at Silver Creek High School.
South Carolina	Charleston Air Force Base, Kiawah Island	October 28	
Georgia	Hunter Army Airfield, Statesboro	October 30	Campaigned for Max Burns at Georgia Southern University.
Texas	Houston, Sugar Land	October 30	Campaigned for Shelley Sekula-Gibbs in Congressional election at Sugar Land Regional Airport.
Georgia	Robins Air Force Base, Perry	October 31	Campaigned for Mac Collins at the Georgia National Fairgrounds and Agricenter.

== November ==
State or country	Areas visited	Dates	Details
Montana	Billings	November 2	Campaigned for Conrad Burns in Senate election at MetraPark Arena.
Nevada	Elko	November 2	Spoke at a Victory 2006 rally at Elko Regional Airport.
Missouri	Springfield, Joplin	November 2–3	Campaigned for Jim Talent at the Springfield Exposition Center and at Missouri Southern State University. Ordered federal disaster aid for the heat wave of 2006 derecho series.
Iowa	Sioux City, Le Mars	November 3	Campaigned for Steve King in Congressional election at Le Mars Community High School.
Colorado	Englewood, Greeley, Aurora	November 3–4	Visited a local business, Mile High Coffee, and Buckley Air Force Base. Campaigned for Marilyn Musgrave in Congressional election at Island Grove Regional Park.
Nebraska	Grand Island	November 5	Spoke at a Victory 2006 rally at the Heartland Events Center.
Kansas	Topeka	November 5	Campaigned for Jim Ryun in Congressional election at the Kansas Expocentre.
Florida	Pensacola	November 6	Spoke at a Victory 2006 rally at Pensacola Civic Center.
Arkansas	Bentonville	November 6	Campaigned for Asa Hutchinson at Northwest Arkansas Regional Airport.
Texas	Dallas	November 6	Campaigned for Rick Perry in gubernatorial election at Reunion Arena.
Russia	Moscow	November 15	Met with President Vladimir Putin.
Singapore	Singapore	November 16–17	Met with the chairman of the Singapore Council of Presidential Advisers, J. Y. Pillay and Prime Minister Lee Hsien Loong. Addressed National University of Singapore.
Vietnam	Hanoi, Ho Chi Minh City	November 17–20	Attended the APEC Summit Meeting.
Indonesia	Jakarta, Bogor	November 20	Met with President Susilo Bambang Yudhoyono.
Hawaii	Honolulu	November 20	Spoke to troops at Hickam Air Force Base in stopover on return from international trip.
Estonia	Tallinn	November 27–28	Met with President Toomas Hendrik Ilves, becoming the first U.S. president to visit the country.
Latvia	Riga	November 28–29	Attended the NATO Summit Meeting.
Jordan	Amman	November 29–30	Met with King Abdullah II and Iraqi Prime Minister Nouri al-Maliki.

== December ==
No trips taken.
