= Keith Butler (Michigan politician) =

American politician (born 1955)

Keith A. Butler (born 1955) is the founding pastor of the nondenominational Word of Faith International Christian Center (WOFICC) Church based in Southfield, Michigan. He is a former Detroit City councilman (1990–1994).

Butler has written several books, including a popular church best-seller, A Seed Will Meet Any Need. He has also obtained several awards for both church and community services. One of the many was "2005 Inductee – Heritage Hall of Fame" for international cultural excellence. He is also well known for setting up satellite churches from San Francisco to Brazil to the UK, numbering well over 300.

Butler, who was born and raised in Detroit, became a Republican in 1982, and has been a GOP activist in presidential campaigns in Michigan.

In 2006, Butler sought the Republican nomination for U.S. Senate to challenge the incumbent Debbie Stabenow. He was however defeated in the primary by Oakland County Sheriff Mike Bouchard, who lost the general election.

In February 2008, Butler replaced Chuck Yob as a Republican National Committee member from Michigan. Butler is on the Executive Board of Christians United for Israel, the pro-Israel organization founded by Rev. John Hagee.

In late 2008, Butler started a church and ministry school in Round Rock, Texas, called Word of Faith Bible Training Center. The church was renamed faith4life in 2009. The Bible School was later renamed Pistis (Greek for "Faith") School of Ministry and relocated to Dallas, Texas. In January 2016, the school was again relocated to Southfield, Michigan. He has also planted numerous churches around the United States as well as Europe.

== Education ==
Butler attended from University of Michigan-Dearborn from September 1973 to May 1977, graduating with a bachelor's degree. He completed theological studies at Rhema Bible Training Center in May 1978, and received an honorary Doctor of Divinity from Canada Christian College.

== Personal life ==
Butler has been married to Deborah Bell for 42 years. They reside in Michigan. They have three adult children (Keith II (Andre), MiChelle, and Kristina). Michelle is the Executive Pastor as well as assistant Pastor at 3:2 Church near Dallas with her husband Leemarc. Kristina is a minister and attorney, and Andre is Pastor of Faith Xperience Church (downtown Detroit). They have 4 granddaughters and 3 grandsons. Butler is an advocate fan of the Pistons, Red Wings Lions and Tigers

== Electoral history ==
- 2006 United States Senate election in Michigan – Republican Primary
  - Mike Bouchard (R), 60%
  - Keith Butler (R), 40%
