= Oakland County Sheriff's Office =

County law enforcement unit in Michigan

- Abbreviation: OCSO

Agency overview
- Formed: 1820
- Employees: 1,400+
- Annual budget: $163 million

Jurisdictional structure
- Operations jurisdiction: Oakland County, Michigan, United States
- Area: 907 square miles (2,350 km^{2})
- Population: 1.2 million
- Legal jurisdiction: Oakland County, Michigan

Operational structure
- Headquarters: Pontiac, Michigan
- Sheriff responsible: Mike Bouchard

Facilities
- Detention Centers: 1

Website
- oakgov.com/sheriff

The Oakland County Sheriff's Office (OCSO) is the principal law enforcement agency of Oakland County, Michigan, United States.

The Sheriff's Office had 859 uniformed officers as of 2017, and has jurisdiction over all of Oakland County, with a population of 1.274 million as of the 2020 census. Fifteen communities, with a total population of roughly 343,000, contract with the Sheriff's Office for all police services.

The Sheriff's Office also includes a marine patrol and rescue unit, responsible for patrolling 450 lakes across the county.

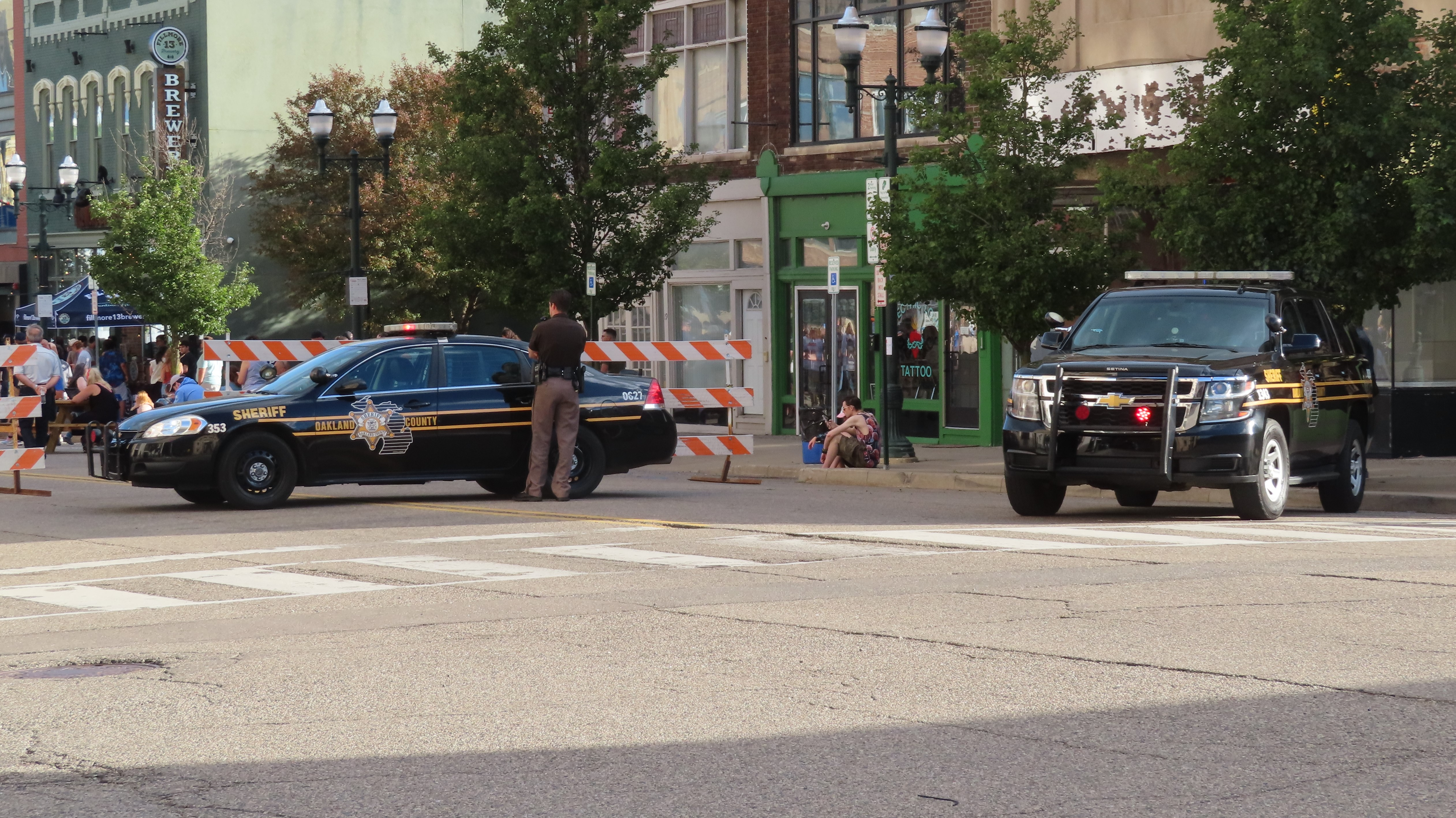
OCSO deputy and patrol cars in downtown Pontiac

Republican Michael Bouchard has served as the Oakland County Sheriff since 1999.

== Headquarters ==
The Oakland County Sheriff's Office is located at 1200 N Telegraph Road, Building 38 East in Pontiac, Michigan, the Oakland County seat.

== Rank structure ==
Title	Insignia
Sheriff	
Undersheriff	
Major	
Captain	
Lieutenant	
Sergeant	
Deputy II	
Deputy I	
Cadet

== Communities served ==
The Sheriff's Office patrols fifteen municipalities under contract. Each city and township has its own substation.

- Addison Township (including the village of Leonard)
- Brandon Township (including the village of Ortonville)
- Clarkston
- Commerce Township
- Highland Township
- Independence Township
- Lyon Township
- Oakland Township
- Orion Township
- Oxford Township
- Springfield Township
- Pontiac
- Rochester Hills

The Addison Township and Brandon Township substations are within the villages of Leonard and Ortonville respectively.

== Specialized units ==
- SWAT
- Traffic
- K-9
- Aviation Unit operating a Eurocopter AS350 Écureuil
- Alcohol Enforcement Unit
- Crash Reconstruction Unit
- Marine and Parks Patrol Units
- Mounted Division
- Honor Guard
- Motorcycle Unit
- Reserves
- Cell Extraction Team
- Cadet unit

== Notable incidents ==
=== Oxford High School shooting ===
The OCSO is the primary law enforcement agency serving Oxford Township, and as such was responsible for the response to the 2021 Oxford High School shooting.

=== Walled Lake family shooting ===
On September 11, 2022, in Walled Lake, Michigan, a QAnon adherent named Igor Lanis shot his wife, one of his two daughters and the family dog following a heated argument. The wife and dog were killed and the daughter was hospitalized. Oakland County Sheriff's Deputies and members of the Walled Lake Police Department shot and killed Lanis after he opened fire on them. The other daughter, Rebecca Lanis, was out of the house at the time and was not harmed. She told reporters that her father had once been kind but had become rude and unsociable after becoming obsessed with several QAnon-related conspiracy theories following the 2020 presidential election. Lanis posted about her experience to r/QAnonCasualties shortly after the shooting.

=== Rochester Hills splash park shooting ===
The OCSO is the primary law enforcement agency serving Rochester Hills, and as such was responsible for the response to the 2024 Rochester Hills shooting.
