= Thomas L. Rhodes =

American political activist (1939–2018)

Thomas Llewellyn "Dusty" Rhodes (né Mathews; July 15, 1939 – March 7, 2018) was an American political activist. He was a co-founder of The Club for Growth and had been the president of National Review magazine until he resigned on June 30, 2010.

== Early life and career ==
Rhodes was born in 1939 in New York, and grew up in Spanish Harlem, the son of Welsh immigrant laborers. He received his master's from the University of Pennsylvania Wharton School. He worked at Goldman Sachs from 1974 to 1992. Rhodes was co-founder of Change New York and was a chief adviser of George Pataki, former governor of New York State. Rhodes held several posts at Goldman, Sachs & Company in New York City. He joined Goldman Sachs in 1974 and subsequently served as vice president (1977–1982); vice chairman, Goldman Sachs Limited, London, England (1982–1985); and partner (1986–1992). Rhodes is Chairman of the Lynde and Harry Bradley Foundation, Milwaukee, Wisconsin; Delphi Financial Group, Inc. & Subsidiaries, New York; Delphi International Ltd., Hamilton, Bermuda; and Oracle Reinsurance Ltd., Hamilton, Bermuda, and had been on the board of The Heritage Foundation since the end of 1993. Rhodes, a graduate of the Wharton School, was also a graduate school classmate to Midge Decter according to the Heritage Foundation.

Rhodes died on March 7, 2018, at the age of 78 after battling Parkinson's disease.

== Organizations and boards ==
Rhodes has helped found many organizations and sits upon several Board of Directors. Some of these organizations and positions are as follows:

- Co-Founder of the American Civil Rights Institute,
- Founder and a trustee of Change-NY,
- Co-Founder and a director of the Project for the Republican Future (1993–1995),
- President of National Review and a member of the magazine’s Board of Directors,
- Trustee of the Empire Foundation for Policy Research,
- Co-chairman of the Club for Growth,
- Trustee of the Heritage Foundation (1993–1999),
- Chairman of the Bradley Foundation.
