= Virginia James =

American investor and donor

- Born: Passaic, New Jersey
- Education: Columbia University
- Occupation: Investor

Virginia James, also known as Virginia Manheimer and Virginia Gilder, is a self-employed investor and conservative donor.

== Personal life and education ==
James grew up in Passaic, New Jersey and Levittown, Pennsylvania. While working as a secretary on Wall Street, she met her husband, Richard Gilder. The couple divorced in 1994. James lives in Lambertville, New Jersey. James graduated from Columbia University.

== Political activity ==
James is Chairwoman of the Empire Foundation for Policy Research, founder of A Brighter Choice (ABC) Scholarships, and a member of the board of the Foundation for Education Reform and Accessibility. James and her ex-husband helped found the Empire Foundation, a conservative think tank, in 1991. James is a supporter of school vouchers. In 1996, James offered to pay for 90% of the private school tuition for any student of Giffen Memorial, an Albany primary school.

James is a co-founder of The Club for Growth, to which she donated $700,000 in 2008. James is on the leadership council of the Club for Growth. James donated $1 million in 2014, $500,000 in 2013, $1.2 million in 2012, and $350,000 in 2010 to the Club for Growth Action. James has also donated to George Pataki, Ted Cruz, Richard Mourdock, and Steve Lonegan. James was a major supporter of Let Freedom Ring, John Templeton, Jr.'s organization that opposed the election of Barack Obama in 2008. James donated $200,000 to Women Speak Out PAC, a project of the Susan B. Anthony List that opposed the re-election of Barack Obama. James donated $400,000 to All Children Matter, Dick DeVos's school voucher advocacy group.
