= Club for Growth Action =

American conservative political action committee

- Founded: 2010
- Type: Political action committee
- Purpose: "Defeating big-government politicians and replacing them with pro-growth, limited government conservatives."
- Location: Washington, D.C.
- Region served: United States
- Method: Congressional elections
- Key people: David M. McIntosh
- Website: Official website

Club for Growth Action is an independent-expenditure only committee or Super PAC with a stated mission of "defeating big-government politicians and replacing them with pro-growth, limited government conservatives." Club for Growth Action spends money running political advertising campaigns in congressional races throughout the country.

Founded in August 2010, Club for Growth Action is an arm of the Club for Growth.

== Political action ==
Club for Growth Action states that it is “dedicated to a single mission: beating big government politicians” of both parties. The group targets mostly Republicans in primaries and Democrats in the general election. It initially opposed Donald Trump in the 2016 presidential primaries.

In February 2013, Club for Growth Action launched a website called “PrimaryMyCongressman.com." Club for Growth president Chris Chocola said the website would "serve as a tool to hold opponents of economic freedom and limited government accountable for their actions.” According to Club for Growth Action, the website will "rotate liberal Republicans through the website to highlight their failed records on limiting government." The first nine targets were Republicans Adam Kinzinger of Illinois, a voluble Donald Trump foe, plus Mike Simpson, Rick Crawford, Frank Lucas, Steven Palazzo, Martha Roby, Larry Bucshon, Renee Ellmers, and Aaron Schock.

== Expenditures ==
Club for Growth Action has spent millions of dollars on independent expenditures in support of candidates endorsed by the Club for Growth PAC. Those candidates include Ted Cruz, Pat Toomey, Jeff Flake, Tom Cotton, Chris McDaniel, Dan Sullivan, and Ben Sasse.

In 2015, after Mike Huckabee announced he was running for the 2016 Republican presidential nomination, Club for Growth Action announced a $100,000 ad buy critical of Huckabee's tax record.

Club for Growth Action was critical of Donald Trump's candidacy, announcing a $1 million advertising buy against his campaign in September 2015. In March 2016, the Club for Growth aired $1.5 million worth of anti-Trump advertisements in Florida. The Club for Growth Action also ran anti-Trump advertisements in Illinois and Wisconsin. In April 2016, Club for Growth Action announced a $1.5 million anti-Trump advertising buy in Indiana in advance of that state's presidential primary. The group's advertisements highlighted Trump's support for liberal policies, such as a single-payer health insurance system and tax increases.

In the 2022 election cycle, Club for Growth Action spent a total of $81,355,585 in independent expenditures. These have included generating television ads against Democratic U.S. Senate candidate Cheri Beasley, Democratic U.S. Senator Catherine Cortez Masto, and Republican U.S. Senate candidate Pat McCrory.

== Funding ==
Club for Growth Action used to receive in-kind contributions from the Club for Growth, but now it receives all of its funding from individual donors. The Center for Public Integrity gave Club for Growth Action a high transparency grade for "significant disclosure." Top donors to Club for Growth Action in 2022 include Jeff Yass, Richard Uihlein, and Virginia James.
