= Marlin Model 20 =

Marlin Glenfield Model 20
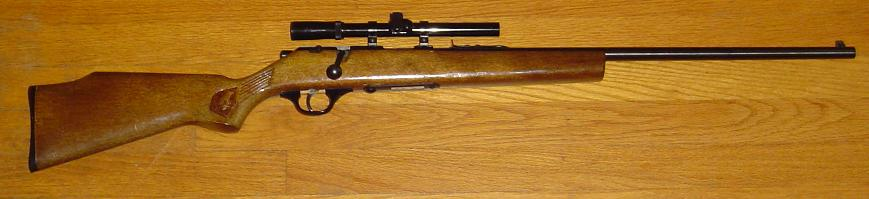
- Type: Hunting rifle
- Place of origin: United States

Production history
- Designer: Marlin Firearms
- Designed: 1960

Specifications
- Mass: 5 lb (2 kg)
- Length: 41 in (1,040 mm)
- Barrel length: 21 in (530 mm)
- Cartridge: .22LR, .22 Short, .22 Long
- Action: Bolt-action
- Effective firing range: 100 yards
- Feed system: 7 rounds; box magazine
- Sights: adjustable open rear, ramp front sight; receiver is grooved for a scope mount

The Marlin No. 20 is a bolt-action .22 caliber rifle with an octagonal barrel and tubular magazine, bearing patents of August 12, 1890 through November 29, 1904, produced by the Marlin Firearms Co. of New Haven, Connecticut.

It is not the same as the Glenfield Model 20 (Marlin 780). The Model 20 is a bolt-action rifle that fires primarily the .22LR rimfire cartridge, but also the .22 short, and the obsolete .22 long (all rimfire cartridges, and can all be fired in the same gun). Produced by the Marlin Firearms Company of North Haven, Connecticut, it was in production from 1960 to 1966.

== Uses ==
The Model 20 is well-suited for small-game hunting and vermin control, as well as a target practice gun.
