= Mike Bouchard =

American politician

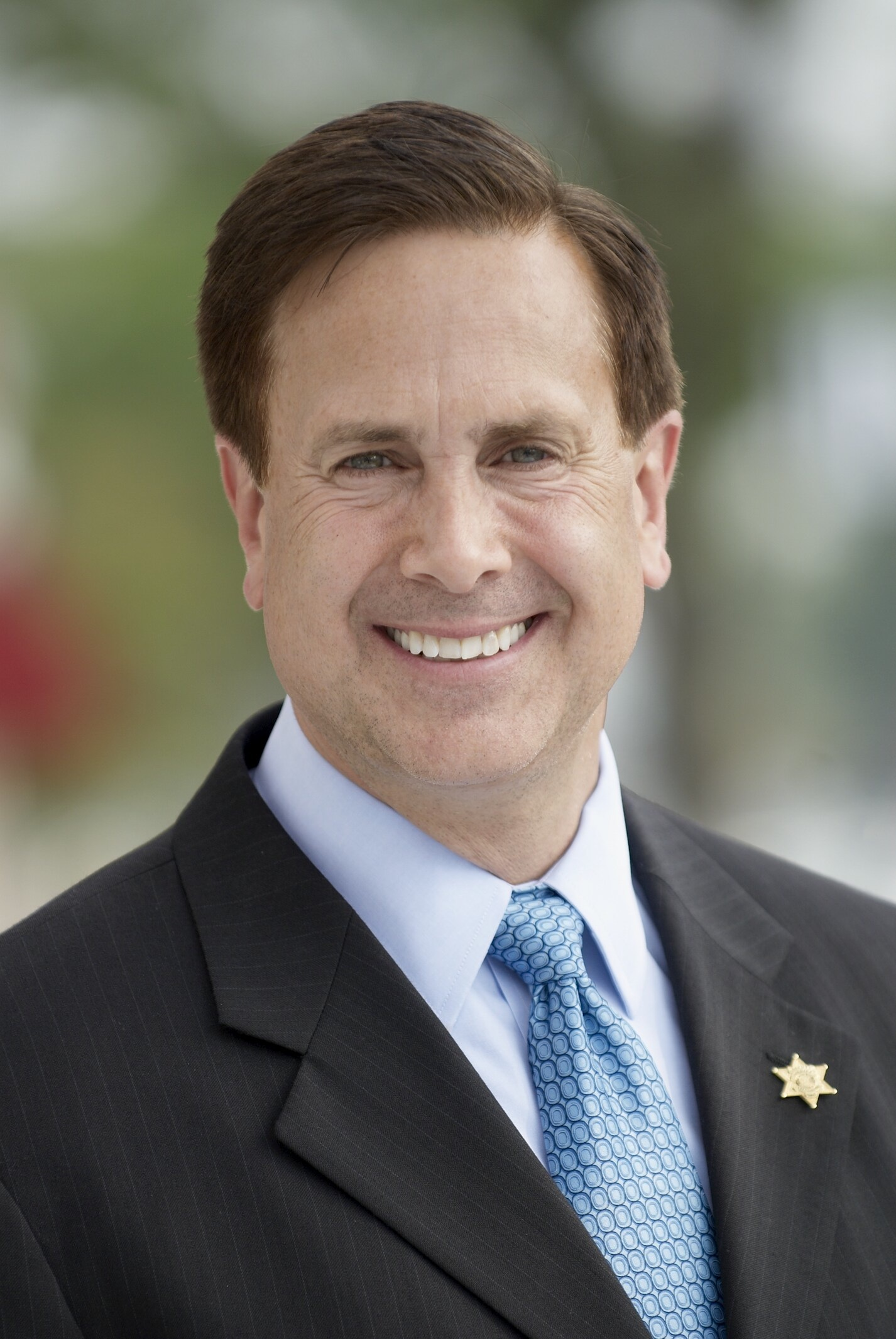
- Bouchard in 2006

Sheriff of Oakland County
- Incumbent
- Assumed office January 11, 1999
- Preceded by: John Nichols

Member of the Michigan Senate from the 13th district
- In office January 11, 1995 – January 2, 1999
- Preceded by: Jack Welborn
- Succeeded by: Shirley Johnson

Member of the Michigan Senate from the 16th district
- In office June 27, 1991 – January 11, 1995
- Preceded by: Doug Cruce
- Succeeded by: Mat Dunaskiss

Member of the Michigan House of Representatives from the 65th district
- In office January 9, 1991 – June 27, 1991
- Preceded by: Judith Miller
- Succeeded by: John Jamian

Personal details
- Born: April 12, 1956 (age 70) Flint, Michigan, U.S.
- Party: Republican
- Spouse: Pamela
- Children: 3
- Education: Michigan State University (BA)

Michael J. Bouchard (born April 12, 1956) is an American law enforcement officer and politician who has served as the sheriff of Oakland County, Michigan, since 1999. A member of the Republican Party, Bouchard previously served in the Michigan Senate from 1991 to 1999, and as the Senate Majority Leader from 1998 to 1999; he was also the unsuccessful Republican nominee for United States Senate in 2006. As of 2026, Bouchard is the only Republican countywide elected official in Oakland County.

Bouchard is of French Canadian and Syrian Lebanese descent. In 2016, he was named Sheriff of the Year by the National Sheriffs' Association.

== Career ==
Bouchard was born in Flint, Michigan. After graduating from Brother Rice High School in 1974, Bouchard attended Michigan State University majoring in criminal justice and police administration. Upon graduation Bouchard entered local law enforcement where he remained for thirteen years.

Bouchard was elected to the Michigan State Senate in 1991. He resigned as senator and majority floor leader in the Michigan State Senate when he was appointed Oakland County Sheriff in January 1999 following the untimely death of long time Sheriff John F. Nichols in December 1998.

Bouchard has served two terms as President of the Major County Sheriffs' Association, which is composed of sheriffs who serve in counties or parishes with a population of 500,000 or more. Bouchard is currently the organization's Vice President of Government Affairs.

In 2007, Bouchard endorsed former Massachusetts Governor Mitt Romney in the 2008 Republican presidential primaries. Romney went on to win the primary vote in Oakland County.

Bouchard ran for a U.S. Senate seat in 2006. He won the Republican nomination with 60 percent of the vote, but then lost to Debbie Stabenow, the incumbent Democratic senator.

In November 2012, Bouchard was elected to his fourth consecutive term as Oakland County Sheriff by an overwhelming majority, the largest number of votes cast for any candidate in Oakland County.

In 2019 he was named a Michigan Master Sheriff, in recognition of his 33 years of service.

Under Bouchard's tenure, the Oakland County Sheriff's Office responded to the 2021 Oxford High School shooting, the 2024 Rochester Hills shooting, and the 2026 Temple Israel synagogue attack.

=== 2010 gubernatorial race ===
Bouchard joined businessman Rick Snyder, state Senator Tom George, Congressman Peter Hoekstra and Michigan Attorney General Mike Cox as Republican candidates. Bouchard finished fourth out of five candidates in the primary, receiving 127,350 votes of the 1,044,925 votes cast.

== Personal life ==
Bouchard is married to his wife Pamela, and has three children, including his son, Michael Jr. who is the Republican nominee for Michigan's 10th congressional district in 2026.

== Electoral history ==
2006 United States Senate election in Michigan

- Mike Bouchard (R), 41%
- Debbie Stabenow (D) (inc.), 57%

2006 election for U.S. Senate - Republican Primary

- Mike Bouchard (R), 60%
- Keith Butler (R), 40%

2010 election for Governor - Republican Primary

- Rick Snyder, 36.4%
- Pete Hoekstra, 26.8%
- Mike Cox, 23.0%
- Mike Bouchard, 12.2%
- Tom George, 1.6%

Oakland County Sheriff's Office

- Re-elected Oakland County Sheriff, 2024
- Re-elected Oakland County Sheriff, 2020
- Re-elected Oakland County Sheriff, 2016
- Re-elected Oakland County Sheriff, 2012
- Re-elected Oakland County Sheriff, 2008
- Re-elected Oakland County Sheriff, 2004
- Elected Oakland County Sheriff, 2000
- Appointed Sheriff of Oakland County, January 11, 1999

Michigan State Senate

- Elected Majority Floor Leader of the Michigan State Senate, 1998
- Re-elected to the State Senate, 1998
- Elected Assistant Majority Leader of the Michigan State Senate, 1995
- Re-elected to the State Senate, 1994
- Elected Assistant President Pro-Tempore of the Michigan State Senate, 1994
- Elected to the State Senate, 1991

Michigan House of Representatives

- Elected to the State House of Representatives, 1990

City Council

- Elected President Pro-Tempore of the Beverly Hills Council, 1987
- Elected to the Beverly Hills Village Council, 1986

Party political offices
Preceded by Spencer Abraham	Republican nominee for U.S. Senator from Michigan (Class 1); 2006	Succeeded by Pete Hoekstra
