= 2024 Rochester Hills shooting =

Mass shooting in Michigan, U.S.

- Location: Rochester Hills, Michigan, U.S.
- Date: June 15, 2024 c. 5:00 p.m. (EDT)
- Attack type: Mass shooting, attempted murder, standoff
- Weapons: 9mm Glock 43 semi-automatic pistol; 9mm Glock 19 semi-automatic pistol (used only in shooter's suicide)
- Deaths: 1 (the perpetrator)
- Injuries: 9
- Perpetrator: Michael William Nash
- Motive: Undetermined, possibly mental illness

On June 15, 2024, nine people, including two children, were shot at the Brooklands Plaza splash pad in Rochester Hills, Michigan, United States. The shooter, 42-year-old Michael William Nash, fired 36 rounds from a Glock 43 semi automatic handgun at random before fleeing the scene in his vehicle. He was discovered dead from a self-inflicted gunshot wound at his mother's home half a mile from the scene following a stand-off with police. Nash was an unemployed resident of Shelby Township who, according to both police and relatives, did not have a criminal record but had dealt with mental health challenges.

== Shooting ==
On June 15, 2024, at around 5:00 p.m. EDT, Nash pulled up in a vehicle at the Brooklands Plaza Splash Pad, a play area with water features intended for children. Nash exited the vehicle with two handguns and proceeded to fire 36 rounds from a Glock 43 semi automatic handgun, reloading several times, before fleeing the scene in the vehicle. Nine people were struck by gunfire, including two children, one of whom was an 8-year-old boy who was shot in the head. Nash abandoned the Glock 43 at the splash pad and three empty magazines were recovered from the scene.

== Stand-off ==
Following the shooting, Nash drove to his home around half a mile away in Shelby Township, where he lived with his mother, who was out of state at the time. The home was located in Dequindre Estates, a mobile home community. Police had responded to the shooting scene around two minutes after the first emergency calls were made and had been able to track Nash to the home through witness vehicle descriptions and tracing the registered handgun left at the splash pad.

Between 45 minutes to an hour after the shooting, police had surrounded the home and contained Nash. Police were unable to make contact with Nash during the five hour stand-off, but had either seen or heard him at the property. Towards the end of the stand-off, police breached the home with both drones and personnel and discovered the shooter dead from a self-inflicted gunshot wound to his chest from a second handgun, a Glock 19. A total of 11 firearms were recovered from the home (including the Glock 19): a Sears .30-30-caliber rifle, Mossberg 410-gauge bolt-action shotgun, a Spikes Tactical AR model .223-caliber rifle, Browning lever-action .22-caliber rifle, a Marlin bolt action .22-caliber rifle, a Remington .243-caliber bolt-action rifle, a Winchester 12-gauge pump action shotgun, Mossberg .22-caliber bolt action, a Western Field 410-gauge pump-action shotgun, and a .22-caliber Rough Rider single-shot pistol.

The discovery of an AR-style rifle left out on a kitchen countertop in the home led police to believe Nash may have been preparing for a second attack.

== Perpetrator ==
Michael William Nash, 42, was identified as the shooter. Nash was unemployed and living with his widowed mother in Shelby Township at the time of the shooting. Neighbors in Dequindre Estates, the mobile home community where Nash lived, described Nash as "quiet" and a "loner", one adding that he "(kept) to himself". Nash had paranoid delusions that the government was spying on him, and at one point told his mother to shut off her phone to avoid being spied on.

== Aftermath ==
The last of the injured victims, a mother who has two children that were also injured, was released from hospital on July 5, having sustained multiple gunshot wounds. The investigation into the shooting is ongoing. The splash pad was closed for two weeks due to the shooting, but reopened on July 3.
