= 2006 United States Senate election in Michigan =

- November 7, 2006
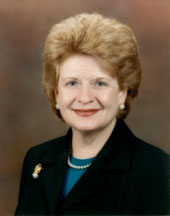

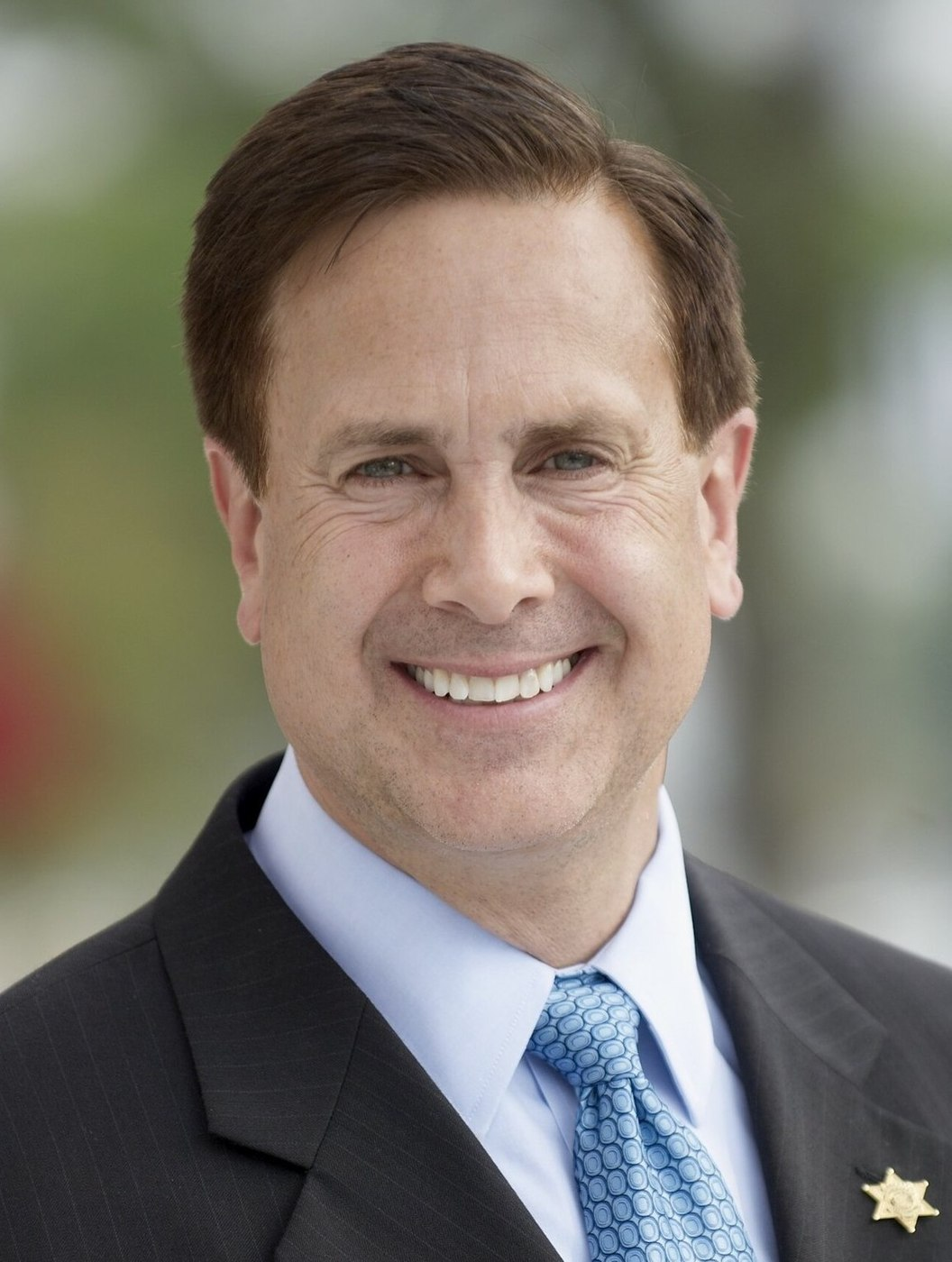
Nominee	Debbie Stabenow	Mike Bouchard
Party	Democratic	Republican
Popular vote	2,151,278	1,559,597
Percentage	56.91%	41.26%
- Stabenow: 40–50% 50–60% 60–70% 70–80% Bouchard: 40–50% 50–60% 60–70%
U.S. senator before election
Debbie Stabenow
Democratic
Elected U.S. Senator
Debbie Stabenow
Democratic

The 2006 United States Senate election in Michigan was held November 7, 2006. Incumbent Democratic U.S. Senator Debbie Stabenow won re-election to a second term.

== General election ==
=== Candidates ===
- Mike Bouchard, Oakland County sheriff (Republican)
- Dennis FitzSimons, retiree (U.S. Taxpayers)
- Leonard Schwartz, attorney and economist (Libertarian)
- David Sole, president of UAW Local 2334 (Green)
- Debbie Stabenow, incumbent U.S. senator (Democratic)

=== Campaign ===
Economic issues were front and center in the campaign, as Michigan's unemployment rate was one of the highest in the nation. In July 2006, unemployment in Michigan stood at approximately 7%, compared with a 4.7% rate nationwide. Pessimism about the state's economic future had left Michigan ranked 49th nationally between 2000 and 2005 in retaining young adults. Since its peak, Detroit had lost over a million people. Bouchard claimed that the incumbent had accomplished nothing, dubbing her "Do-Nothing Debbie." President George W. Bush came to Michigan and raised $1 million for Bouchard.

==== Debates ====
- Complete video of debate, October 15, 2006
- Complete video of debate, October 18, 2006

=== Predictions ===
Source	Ranking	As of
The Cook Political Report	Lean D	November 6, 2006
Sabato's Crystal Ball	Likely D	November 6, 2006
Rothenberg Political Report	Likely D	November 6, 2006
Real Clear Politics	Likely D	November 6, 2006

=== Polling ===
Source	Date	Debbie Stabenow (D)	Mike Bouchard (R)
Strategic Vision (R)	November 21, 2005	45%	31%
EPIC/MRA	November 28, 2005	56%	36%
Rasmussen	December 3, 2005	49%	33%
Strategic Vision (R)	December 22, 2005	47%	35%
Rasmussen	January 20, 2006	56%	31%
Strategic Vision (R)	February 3, 2006	49%	36%
Rasmussen	February 15, 2006	54%	33%
Strategic Vision (R)	March 15, 2006	48%	37%
WSJ/Zogby	March 31, 2006	52%	38%
Rasmussen	April 6, 2006	51%	37%
Strategic Vision (R)	April 21, 2006	48%	38%
Rasmussen	May 5, 2006	54%	34%
Mitchell Research	May 1–9, 2006	50%	37%
Strategic Vision (R)	May 24, 2006	48%	36%
Strategic Vision (R)	June 21, 2006	50%	37%
WSJ/Zogby	June 21, 2006	49%	41%
Free Press-Local 4	July 16, 2006	49%	29%
WSJ/Zogby	July 24, 2006	48%	42%
Strategic Vision (R)	July 27, 2006	52%	36%
Rasmussen	August 16, 2006	49%	44%
EPIC/MRA	August 16, 2006	54%	42%
WSJ/Zogby	August 28, 2006	49%	45%
Strategic Vision (R)	August 29, 2006	49%	42%
Free Press-Local 4	August 28–30, 2006	50%	37%
Rasmussen	August 31, 2006	51%	43%
WSJ/Zogby	September 11, 2006	50%	44%
EPIC-MRA	September 14, 2006	54%	34%
Strategic Vision (R)	September 20, 2006	51%	44%
WSJ/Zogby	September 28, 2006	49%	42%
EPIC-MRA	October 5, 2006	48%	35%
SurveyUSA	October 9, 2006	53%	42%
Rasmussen	October 9, 2006	56%	39%
Free Press-Local 4	October 15, 2006	48%	35%
WSJ/Zogby	October 19, 2006	48%	44%
Strategic Vision (R)	October 24, 2006	48%	42%
Lake Research (D)	October 24, 2006	53%	35%
Rasmussen	October 25, 2006	55%	39%
Research 2000	October 25, 2006	51%	44%
WSJ/Zogby	October 31, 2006	49%	43%
Strategic Vision (R)	November 2, 2006	49%	42%
Free Press-Local 4	November 5, 2006	53%	34%
Mason-Dixon/MSNBC	November 5, 2006	53%	37%
Strategic Vision (R)	November 6, 2006	50%	44%

=== Results ===
From a long way out, Stabenow looked like she might be vulnerable. President Bush even came to Michigan to campaign for Bouchard, raising over $1,000,000 for him. However Bouchard never won a single poll. By October, the Republican Party started taking resources out of Michigan to focus on closer races, essentially ceding the race to Stabenow. Stabenow went on to win the election easily, capturing nearly 57% of the vote. She did well throughout Michigan, but performed better in heavily populated cities like Detroit, Lansing, Ann Arbor, and Kalamazoo. Bouchard did win Grand Rapids, a typical Republican area. He also won in many rural areas around the state. However, Bouchard failed to put a dent in Stabenow's lead, largely due to her strong performance in heavily populated areas. Bouchard conceded to Stabenow at 9:58 P.M. EST. The following results are official.

2006 United States Senate election in Michigan
Party	Candidate	Votes	%	±%
Democratic	Debbie Stabenow (incumbent)	2,151,278	56.91%	+7.44%
Republican	Mike Bouchard	1,559,597	41.26%	−6.60%
Libertarian	Leonard Schwartz	27,012	0.72%	0%
Green	David Sole	23,890	0.63%	−0.27%
Constitution	Dennis FitzSimons	18,341	0.48%	+0.20%
Majority		591,681	15.6%	
Turnout		3,780,142	52.64%	
Democratic hold		Swing	7%	

==== Counties that flipped from Republican to Democratic ====
- Alger (largest city: Munising)
- Alpena (largest city: Alpena)
- Arenac (largest city: Standish)
- Benzie (largest city: Frankfort)
- Clare (largest city: Clare)
- Delta (largest city: Escanaba)
- Gladwin (largest city: Gladwin)
- Gratiot (largest city: Alma)
- Iosco (largest city: East Tawas)
- Jackson (largest city: Jackson)
- Leelanau (largest settlement: Greilickville)
- Lenawee (largest city: Adrian)
- Mason (largest city: Ludington)
- Menominee (largest city: Menominee)
- Ogemaw (largest city: West Branch)
- Ontonagon (largest village: Ontonagon)
- Presque Isle (largest city: Rogers City)
- Roscommon (largest settlement: Houghton Lake)
- Schoolcraft (largest city: Manistique)
- St. Clair (largest city: Port Huron)
- Calhoun (largest city: Battle Creek)
- Lake (largest village: Baldwin)
- Manistee (largest city: Manistee)
- Monroe (largest city: Monroe)
- Saginaw (largest city: Saginaw)
- Shiawassee (largest city: Owosso)
- Van Buren (largest city: South Haven)
- Keweenaw (largest city: Ahmeek)
- Houghton (largest city: Houghton)
- Mackinac (largest city: St. Ignace)
- Dickinson (largest city: Iron Mountain)
- Baraga (largest city: Baraga)
- Luce (largest city: Newberry)
- Chippewa (largest city: Sault Ste. Marie)
- Montmorency (largest city: Lewiston)
- Cheboygan (largest city: Cheboygan)
- Crawford (largest city: Grayling)
- Oscoda (largest city: Mio)
- Alcona (largest city: Harrisville)
- Wexford (largest city: Cadillac)
- Huron (largest city: Bad Axe)
- Sanilac (largest city: Sandusky)
- Tuscola (largest city: Caro)
- Lapeer (largest city: Lapeer)
- Ionia (largest city: Ionia)
- Montcalm (largest city: Greenville)
- Midland (largest city: Midland)
- Cass (largest city: Dowagiac)
- Branch (largest city: Coldwater)
- Charlevoix (largest city: Boyne City)
- Oceana (largest city: Hart)
- Eaton (largest city: Charlotte)
- Leelanau (largest municipality: Greilickville)
- Isabella (largest city: Mount Pleasant)
- Clinton (largest city: St. Johns)
- Kalamazoo (largest city: kalamazoo)
- Oakland (largest city: Troy)

== See also ==
- 2006 United States Senate elections
